= Hodiș =

Hodiș may refer to several villages in Romania:

- Hodiș, a village in Bârsa Commune, Arad County
- Hodiș, a village in Holod Commune, Bihor County
- Hodiș (river), a river in Arad County
