= Zimbru =

Zimbru is the Romanian word for the European bison.

Zimbru may also refer to:

- FC Zimbru Chișinău, a football club from Moldova
- FC Zimbru-2 Chișinău, the second team of the club mentioned above
- Zimbru Stadium, the official stadium of the club FC Zimbru Chișinău
- Zimbru, a village in Gurahonț Commune, Arad County, Romania
- Zimbru, a village in Ulmu Commune, Călărași County, Romania
- Zimbru, a village in Bălăbănești Commune, Galați County, Romania
- Zimbru (river), a tributary of the Crișul Alb in Arad County, Romania
