= Gut (Crișul Alb) =

Gut Condratău
- Location within Romania

Location
- Country: Romania
- Counties: Arad County

Physical characteristics
- Mouth: Crișul Alb
  - location: Downstream of Șicula
  - coordinates: 46.4214°N 21.7254°E
- Length: 23 km (14 mi)
- Basin size: 75 km^{2} (29 sq mi)

Basin features
- Progression: Crișul Alb→ Körös→ Tisza→ Danube→ Black Sea

The Gut (also: Condratău) is a left tributary of the river Crișul Alb in Romania. It discharges into the Crișul Alb near Șicula. Its length is 23 km (14 mi) and its basin size is 75 km^{2} (29 sq mi).
