= Păulian =

Păulian or Paulian may refer to several villages in Romania:

- Păulian, a village in Buteni Commune, Arad County
- Paulian, a village in Doba Commune, Satu Mare County
