= Cleceova =

- Location within Romania

Location
- Country: Romania
- Counties: Arad County

Physical characteristics
- Mouth: Crișul Alb
  - location: Buteni
  - coordinates: 46.3484°N 22.1162°E
- Length: 13 km (8.1 mi)
- Basin size: 21 km^{2} (8.1 sq mi)

Basin features
- Progression: Crișul Alb→ Körös→ Tisza→ Danube→ Black Sea

The Cleceova is a left tributary of the river Crișul Alb in Romania. It flows into the Crișul Alb near Buteni. Its length is 13 km (8.1 mi) and its basin size is 21 km^{2} (8.1 sq mi). Most of its flow is diverted into the Canalul Morilor, which flows parallel to the south of the Crișul Alb.
