= Bodești (disambiguation) =

Bodești may refer to several places in Romania:

- Bodești, a commune in Neamț County, and Bodeștii de Jos, a village in that commune
- Bodești, a village in Vadu Moților Commune, Alba County
- Bodești, a village in Hălmagiu Commune, Arad County
- Bodești, a village in Scânteia Commune, Iași County
- Bodești, a village in Posești Commune, Prahova County
- Bodești, a village in Vrâncioaia Commune, Vrancea County
- Bodești, a village in Alunu Commune, Vâlcea County
- Bodești, a village in Bărbătești Commune, Vâlcea County
- Bodești (river), a tributary of the Crișul Alb in Arad County
