= Mustești =

River in Romania

- Location within Romania

Location
- Country: Romania
- Counties: Arad County
- Villages: Mustești, Bonțești

Physical characteristics
- Mouth: Crișul Alb
  - location: Bonțești
  - coordinates: 46.2789°N 22.3135°E
- Length: 14 km (8.7 mi)
- Basin size: 19 km^{2} (7.3 sq mi)

Basin features
- Progression: Crișul Alb→ Körös→ Tisza→ Danube→ Black Sea

The Mustești is a left tributary of the river Crișul Alb in Romania. It discharges into the Crișul Alb in Bonțești. Its length is 14 km (8.7 mi) and its basin size is 19 km^{2} (7.3 sq mi).
