= Risca (disambiguation) =

Risca may refer to:

- Risca, a town in Wales, United Kingdom
- Risca, a character in Terry Brooks's Shannara series
- Rişca, a village in Baia de Criş Commune, Hunedoara County, Romania
