= Baldovin (river) =

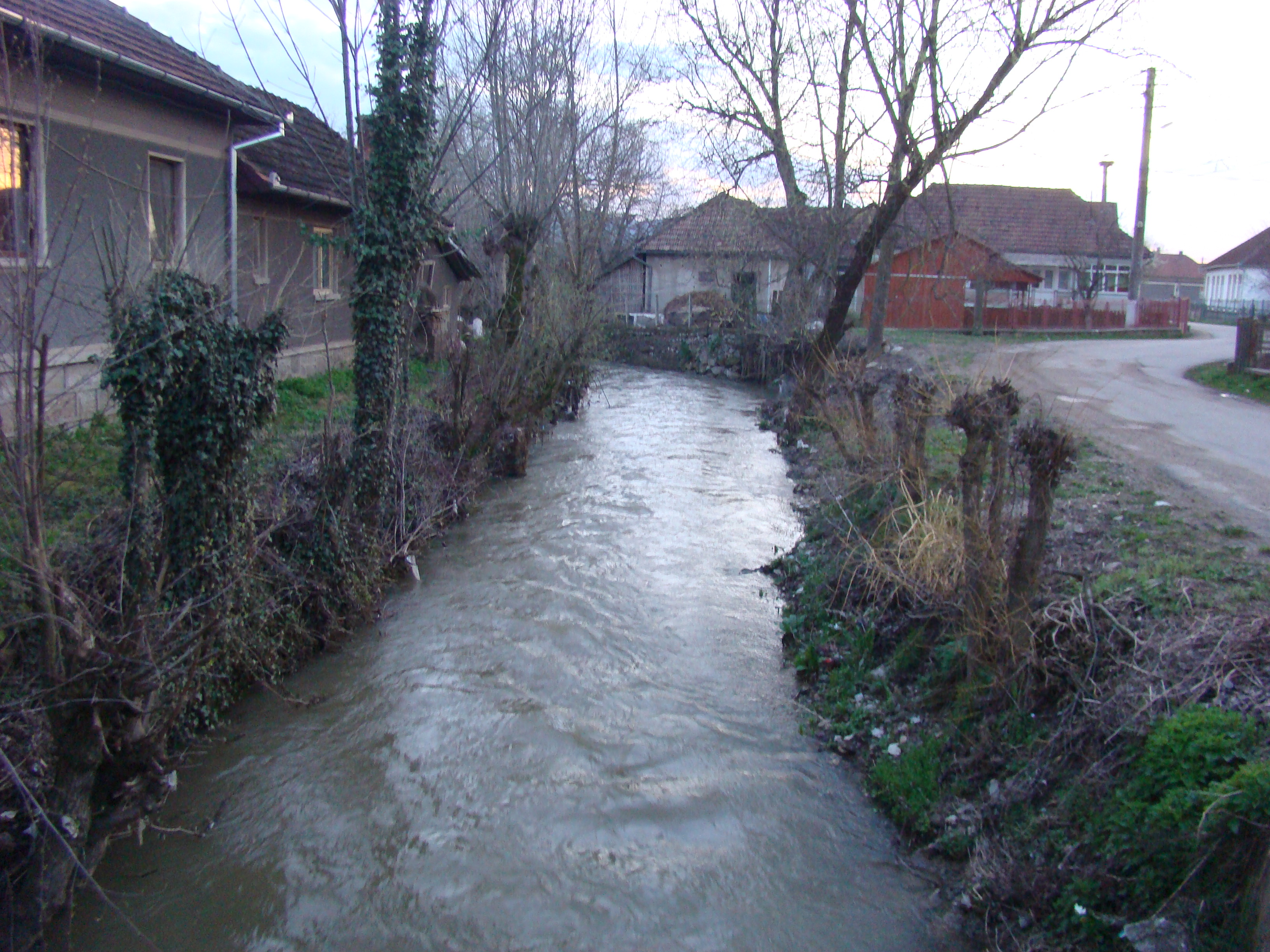

- Location within Romania

Location
- Country: Romania
- Counties: Hunedoara County
- Villages: Rișculița, Baldovin, Baia de Criș

Physical characteristics
- Source: Bihor Mountains
- Mouth: Crișul Alb
  - location: Baia de Criș
  - coordinates: 46.1832°N 22.7069°E
- Length: 13 km (8.1 mi)
- Basin size: 41 km^{2} (16 sq mi)

Basin features
- Progression: Crișul Alb→ Körös→ Tisza→ Danube→ Black Sea
- Tributaries
  - left: Znil (Valea Ciorii)

The Baldovin is a right tributary of the river Crișul Alb in Romania. It discharges into the Crișul Alb in Baia de Criș. Its length is 13 km (8.1 mi) and its basin size is 41 km^{2} (16 sq mi).
