= Hodiș (river) =

River in Romania

- Location within Romania

Location
- Country: Romania
- Counties: Arad County
- Villages: Cuied, Hodiș, Bârsa

Physical characteristics
- Mouth: Crișul Alb
  - location: Bârsa
  - coordinates: 46.3850°N 22.0779°E
- Length: 16 km (9.9 mi)
- Basin size: 48 km^{2} (19 sq mi)

Basin features
- Progression: Crișul Alb→ Körös→ Tisza→ Danube→ Black Sea
- Tributaries
  - left: Valea Mare

The Hodiș is a left tributary of the river Crișul Alb in Romania. It flows into the Crișul Alb near Bârsa. Its length is 16 km (9.9 mi) and its basin size is 48 km^{2} (19 sq mi). Part of its flow is diverted into the Canalul Morilor, which flows parallel to the south of the Crișul Alb.
