= Valea Satului (Crișul Alb) =

- Location within Romania

Location
- Country: Romania
- Counties: Hunedoara County
- Villages: Tarnița, Buceș

Physical characteristics
- Source: Metaliferi Mountains
- Mouth: Crișul Alb
  - coordinates: 46.1890°N 22.9160°E
- Length: 18 km (11 mi)
- Basin size: 105 km^{2} (41 sq mi)

Basin features
- Progression: Crișul Alb→ Körös→ Tisza→ Danube→ Black Sea
- Tributaries
  - left: Stănija
  - right: Buceș

The Valea Satului is a left tributary of the river Crișul Alb in Romania. It flows into the Crișul Alb near Buceș. Its length is 18 km (11 mi) and its basin size is 105 km^{2} (41 sq mi).
