= Crișul Alb =

River in Hungary and Romania

Crișul Alb Fehér-Körös
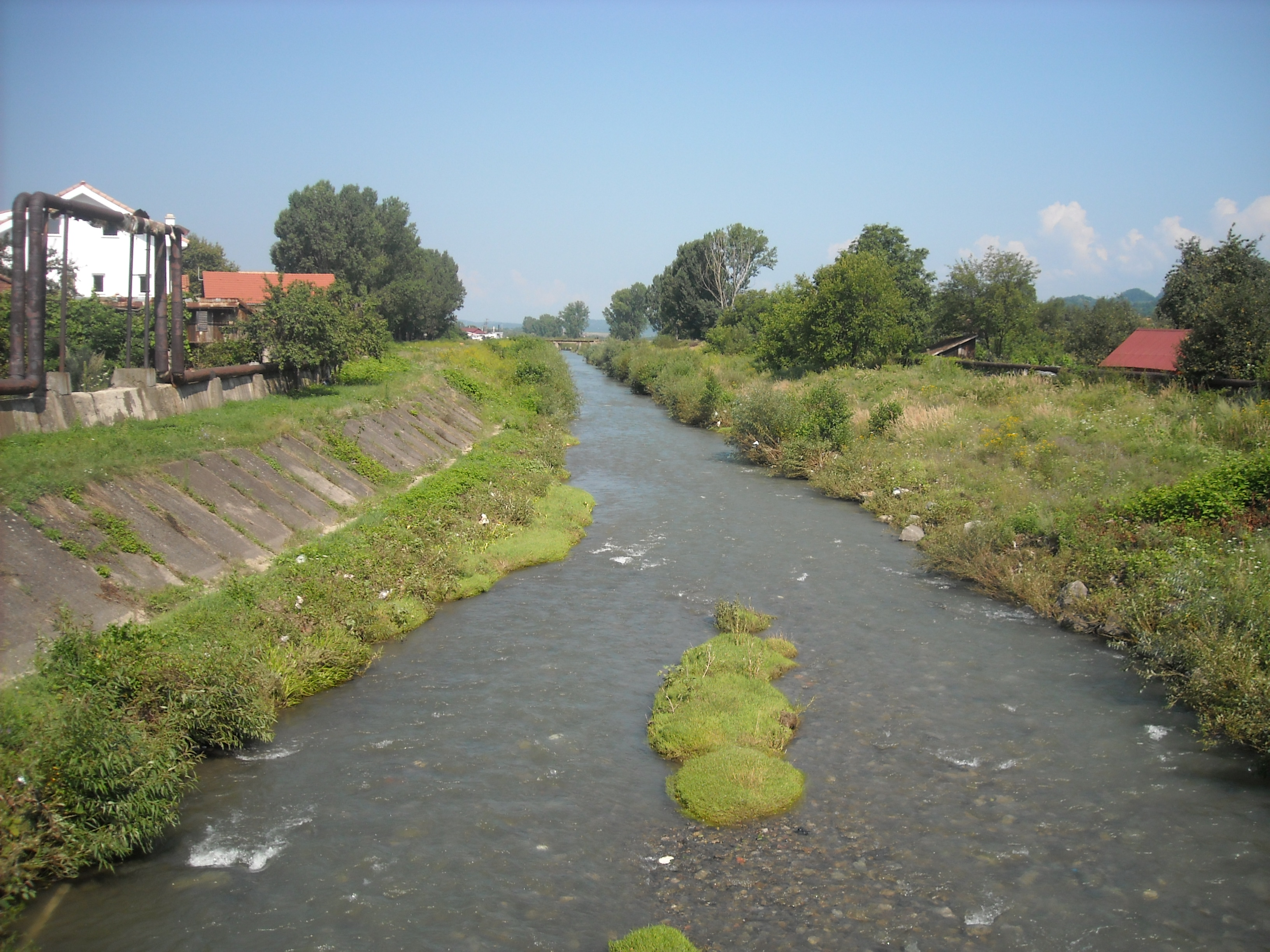
- Crișul Alb at Brad

- Location within Hungary Location within Romania

Location
- Countries: Romania and Hungary
- Counties: Romania: Hunedoara and Arad; Hungary: Békés
- Towns: Brad; Gyula

Physical characteristics
- Source: Apuseni Mountains
- Mouth: Körös
  - location: near Gyula
  - coordinates: 46°42′1″N 21°16′9″E
- Length: 236 km (147 mi)

Basin features
- Progression: Körös→ Tisza→ Danube→ Black Sea
- Tributaries
  - left: Cigher

The Crișul Alb (Romanian), (Hungarian: Fehér-Körös), is a river in western Romania, in the historical region of Transylvania, and in south-eastern Hungary (Békés County).

Its source is in the southern Apuseni Mountains (Romanian: Munții Apuseni) of Romania. It flows through the towns of Brad, Ineu, Chișineu-Criș in Romania, and Gyula in Hungary. Crossing the border of Hungary, the river, now called Fehér-Körös, joins the Fekete-Körös (Crișul Negru) a few kilometres north from Gyula to form the river Körös (Criș), which ultimately flows into the Danube. In Romania, its length is 234 km (145 mi), and its basin size is 4,240 km^{2} (1,640 sq mi).

== Towns and villages ==
The following towns and villages are situated along the river Crișul Alb, from source to mouth.

- In Romania: Brad, Baia de Criș, Hălmagiu, Gurahonț, Dieci, Sebiș, Bocsig, Ineu, Șicula, Chișineu-Criș.
- In Hungary: Gyula, Doboz.

== Tributaries ==
The following rivers are tributaries to the river Crișul Alb:

- Left: Valea Laptelui, Plai, Valea Satului, Bucureșci, Luncoiu, Țebea, Birtin, Vața, Prăvăleni, Valea Mare, Valea Rea, Sighișoara, Mustești, Bodești, Almaș, Chisindia, Cleceova, Hodiș, Potoc, Trei Holâmburi, Gut, Cigher, Valea Nouă Chișer.
- Right: Artan, Brad, Junc, Ribița, Baldovin, Obârșa, Ociu, Bănești, Leasa, Valea de la Lazuri, Tăcășele, Gruieț, Zimbru, Feniș, Crocna, Dumbrăvița, Craicova, Topasca, Sebiș.

The Canalul Morilor, an irrigation canal, runs parallel to the Crișul Alb through the lowland area between Buteni and Pilu.
