= Bodești (river) =

- Location within Romania

Location
- Country: Romania
- Counties: Arad County
- Villages: Rădești, Cil

Physical characteristics
- Mouth: Crișul Alb
  - location: Pescari
  - coordinates: 46.3037°N 22.2835°E
- Length: 16 km (9.9 mi)
- Basin size: 33 km^{2} (13 sq mi)

Basin features
- Progression: Crișul Alb→ Körös→ Tisza→ Danube→ Black Sea

The Bodești is a left tributary of the river Crișul Alb in Romania. It discharges into the Crișul Alb near Pescari. Its length is 16 km (9.9 mi) and its basin size is 33 km^{2} (13 sq mi).
