= Valea de la Lazuri =

- Location within Romania

Location
- Country: Romania
- Counties: Arad County
- Villages: Lazuri

Physical characteristics
- Mouth: Crișul Alb
  - location: Vârfurile
  - coordinates: 46.2919°N 22.5132°E
- Length: 22 km (14 mi)
- Basin size: 100 km^{2} (39 sq mi)

Basin features
- Progression: Crișul Alb→ Körös→ Tisza→ Danube→ Black Sea
- Tributaries
  - right: Glimea

The Valea de la Lazuri (also: Leuca) is a river in Romania, a right tributary of the Crișul Alb. It flows into the Crișul Alb in Vârfurile. Its length is 22 km (14 mi) and its basin size is 100 km^{2} (39 sq mi).
