= Țebea =

- Location within Romania

Location
- Country: Romania
- Counties: Hunedoara County

Physical characteristics
- Source: Bihor Mountains
- Mouth: Crișul Alb
  - location: Țebea
  - coordinates: 46.1743°N 22.7294°E
- Length: 11 km (6.8 mi)
- Basin size: 16 km^{2} (6.2 sq mi)

Basin features
- Progression: Crișul Alb→ Körös→ Tisza→ Danube→ Black Sea

The Țebea is a left tributary of the river Crișul Alb in Romania. It discharges into the Crișul Alb in the village Țebea. Its length is 11 km (6.8 mi) and its basin size is 16 km^{2} (6.2 sq mi).
