= Almaș =

- Commune
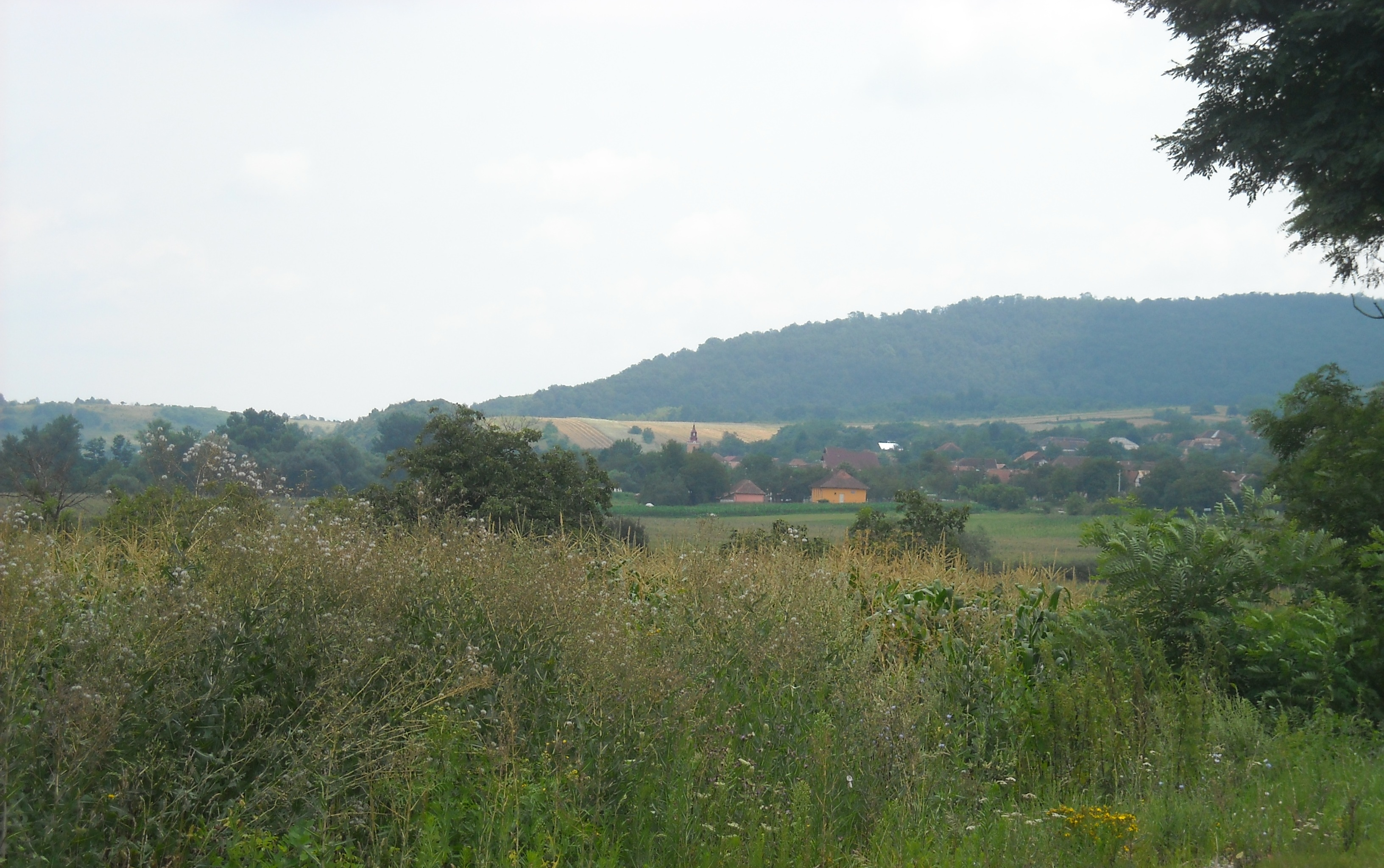
- View of Joia Mare village

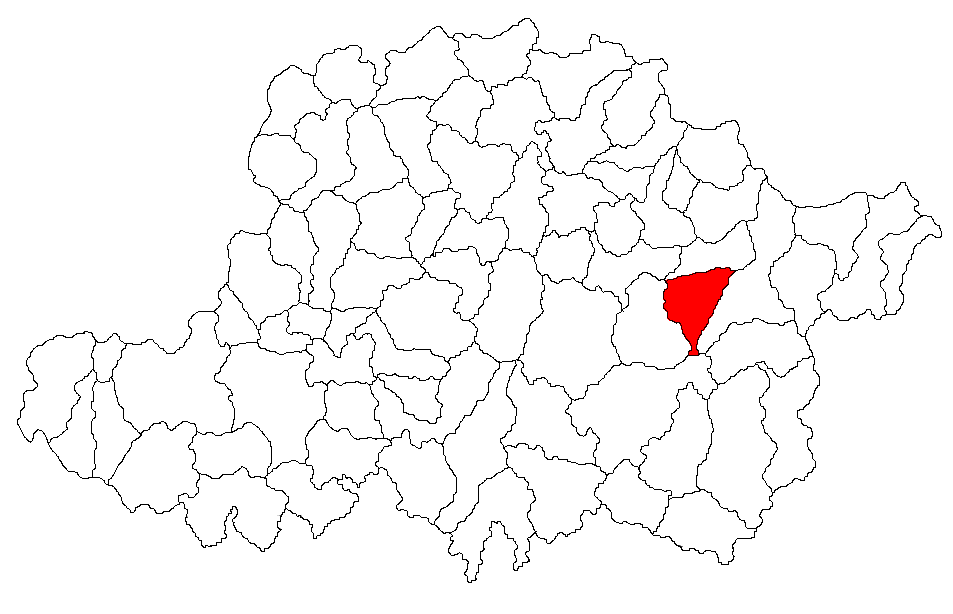
- Location in Arad County

- Location in Romania
- Coordinates: 46°16′58″N 22°13′59″E
- Country: Romania
- County: Arad
- Population (2021-12-01): 2,191
- Time zone: UTC+02:00 (EET)
  - Summer (DST): UTC+03:00 (EEST)
- Vehicle reg.: AR

Almaș (Hungarian: Háromalmás) is a commune in Arad County, Romania. Situated in the Gurahonț Basin, in the left valley of the Crişul Alb River, the commune is composed of four villages: Almaș (situated at 97 km (60 mi) from Arad), Cil (Alcsil), Joia Mare (Kakaró) and Rădești (Bozósd). Its total administrative territory is 8127 ha.

== Population ==
According to the last census the population of the commune counts 3009 inhabitants. From an ethnic point of view, it has the following structure: 96.3% are Romanians, 0.2% Hungarians, 3.4% Roma and 0.1% are of other or undeclared nationalities.

== History ==
The first documentary record of the locality Almaș dates back to 1334. Cil was mentioned in documents in 1369, Rădești in 1441, and Joia Mare in 1439.

== Tourism ==
There is a monastery dedicated to the Annunciation, and the Rădeștilor Valley.
