= Zimbru (river) =

River in Romania

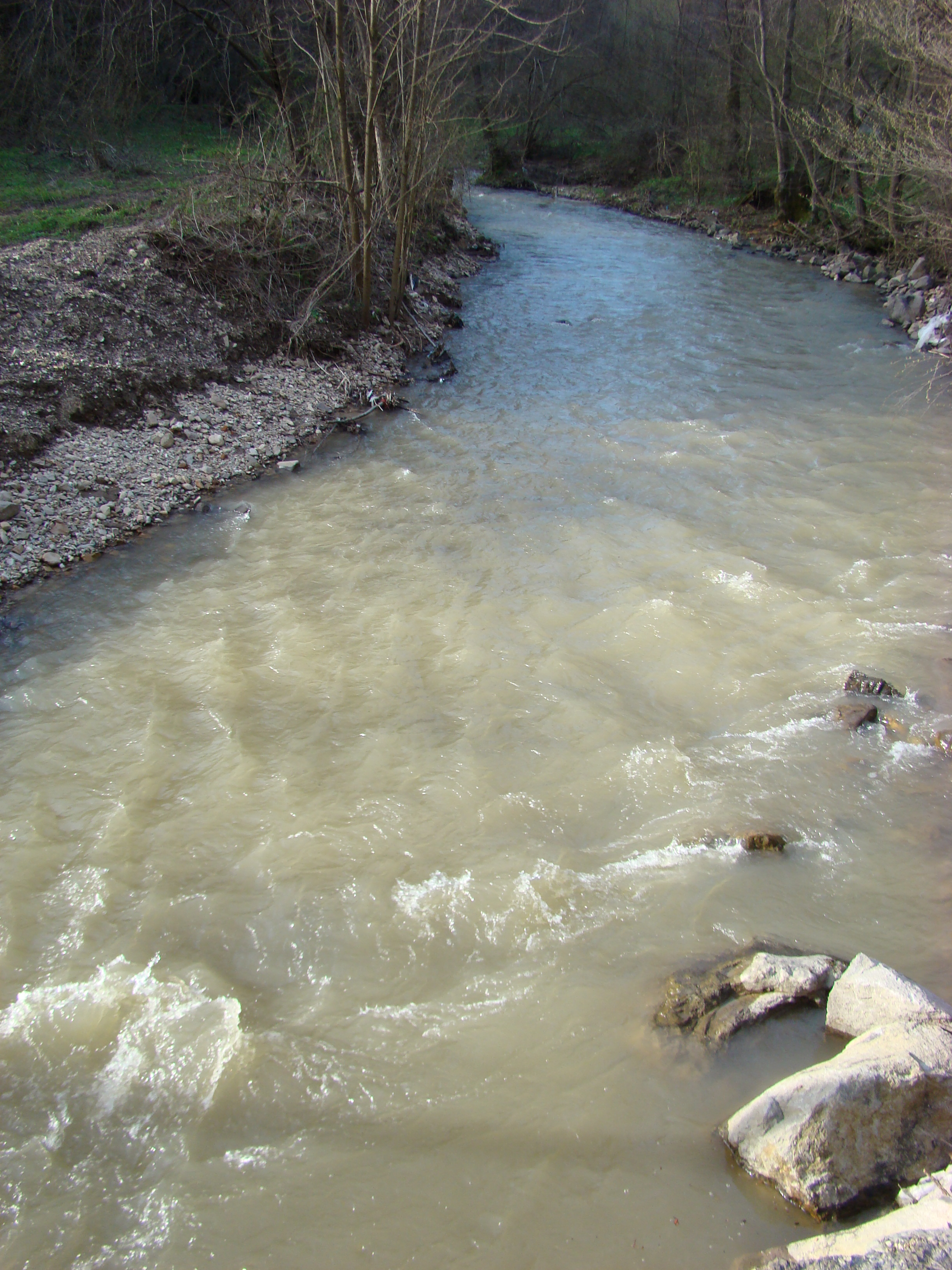

- Location within Romania

Location
- Country: Romania
- Counties: Arad County
- Villages: Zimbru, Valea Mare, Iosășel, Iosaș

Physical characteristics
- Mouth: Crișul Alb
  - location: Gurahonț
  - coordinates: 46.2780°N 22.3395°E
- Length: 20 km (12 mi)
- Basin size: 81 km^{2} (31 sq mi)

Basin features
- Progression: Crișul Alb→ Körös→ Tisza→ Danube→ Black Sea
- Tributaries
  - left: Brusturescu
  - right: Luștiu, Zimbruț

The Zimbru is a right tributary of the river Crișul Alb in Romania. It discharges into the Crișul Alb in Iosaș, near Gurahonț. Its length is 20 km (12 mi) and its basin size is 81 km^{2} (31 sq mi).
