= Dieci, Arad =

Dieci
- Commune
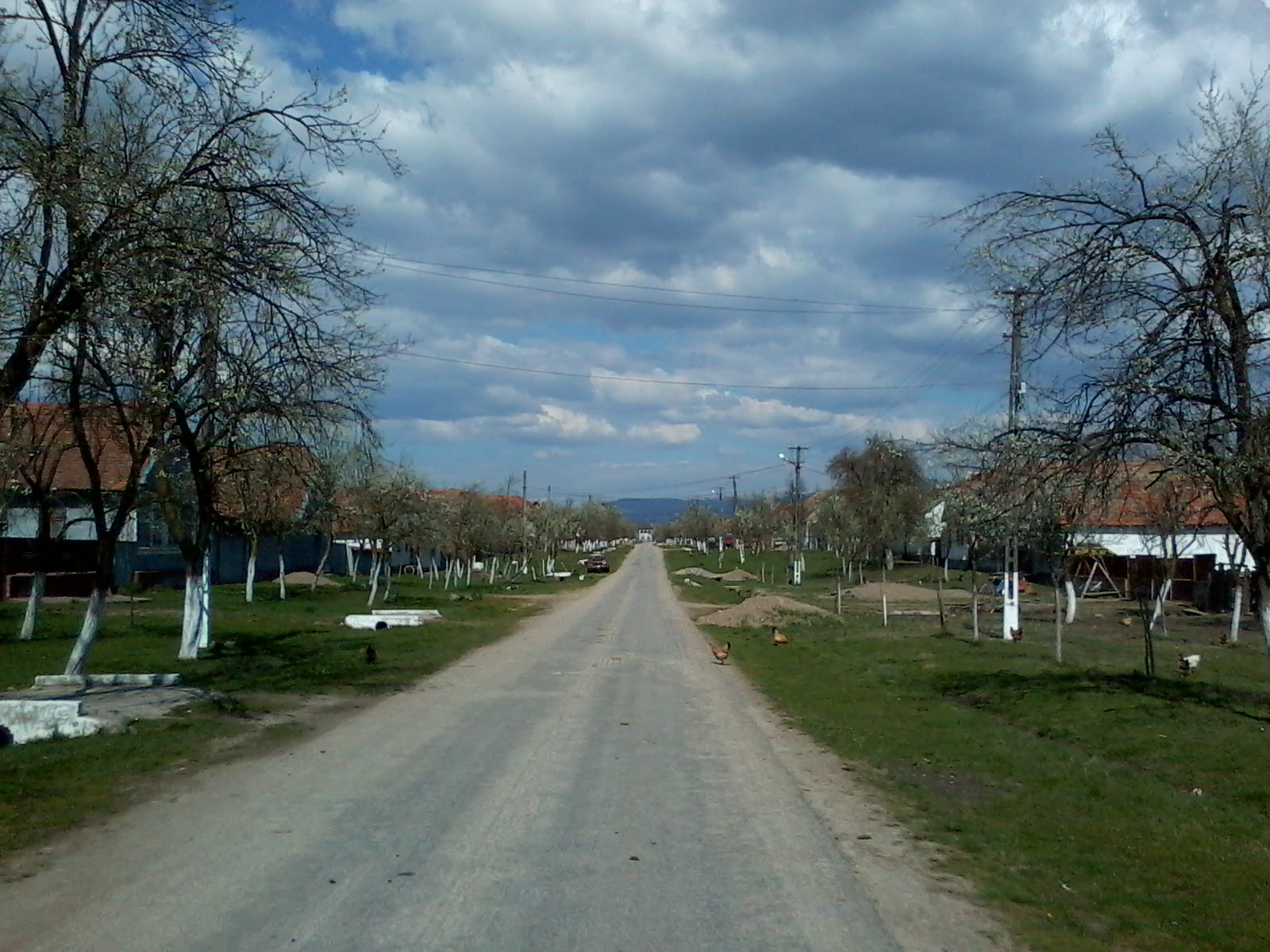

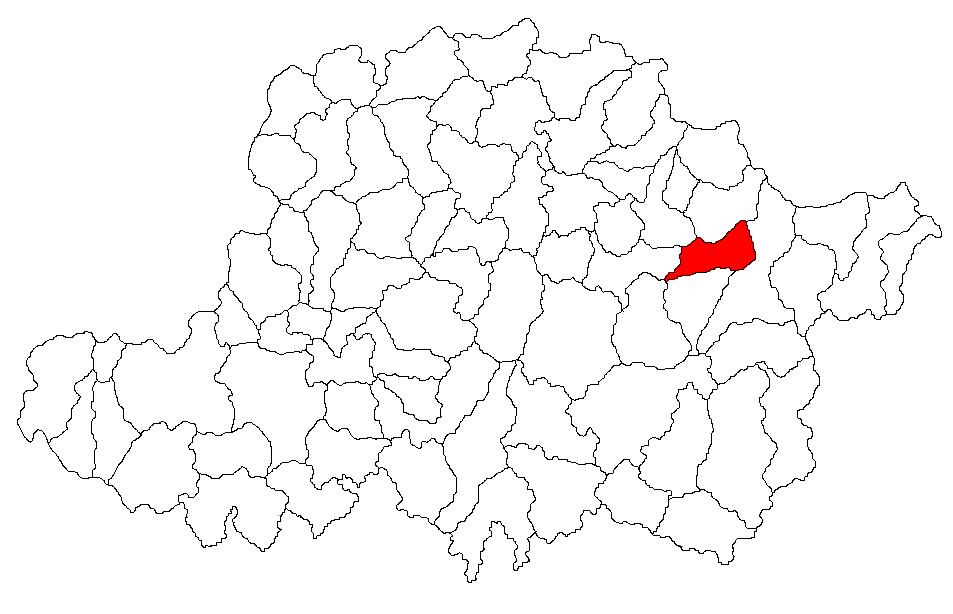
- Location in Arad County

- Location in Romania
- Coordinates: 46°19′N 22°15′E
- Country: Romania
- County: Arad
- Population (2021-12-01): 1,388
- Time zone: UTC+02:00 (EET)
  - Summer (DST): UTC+03:00 (EEST)
- Vehicle reg.: AR

Dieci (Hungarian: Décse) is a commune in Arad County, Romania. Dieci commune is situated in the Gurahonț Basin, on the right bank of the Crișul Alb River, and it stretches over 8469 hectares. It is composed of five villages: Cociuba (Köröskocsoba), Crocna (Koroknya), Dieci (situated 100 km from Arad), Revetiș (Rékes) and Roșia (Borosrósa).

== Population ==
According to the last census, the population of the commune counts 1754 inhabitants, out of which 98,6% are Romanians, 1,1% Roms and 0,3% are of other or undeclared nationalities.

== History ==
The first documentary record of Dieci dates back to 1613. Cociuba and Roșia were attested documentarily in 1553, Crocna in 1448, while Revetiș between 1553–1561.

== Economy ==
The economy of the commune is mainly agricultural, both component sectors are well-developed. The most important exploitable resource of the subsoil is andesite - magmatic rock often used for constructions.

== Tourism ==
The main touristic attraction of the commune is the wooden church from the 18th century in Roșia and the Ethnographic Museum in Revetiș.
