= Vața =

- Location within Romania

Location
- Country: Romania
- Counties: Hunedoara County
- Villages: Căzănești, Vața de Sus, Vața de Jos

Physical characteristics
- Source: Bihor Mountains
- Mouth: Crișul Alb
  - location: Vața de Jos
  - coordinates: 46.1747°N 22.5970°E
- Length: 24 km (15 mi)
- Basin size: 87 km^{2} (34 sq mi)

Basin features
- Progression: Crișul Alb→ Körös→ Tisza→ Danube→ Black Sea
- Tributaries
  - left: Crișoaia
  - right: Cerboaia

The Vața is a left tributary of the river Crișul Alb in Romania. It discharges into the Crișul Alb in Vața de Jos. Its length is 24 km (15 mi) and its basin size is 87 km^{2} (34 sq mi).
