= Junc =

- Location within Romania

Location
- Country: Romania
- Counties: Hunedoara County
- Villages: Dumbrava de Sus, Dumbrava de Jos, Crișan

Physical characteristics
- Source: Bihor Mountains
- Mouth: Crișul Alb
  - coordinates: 46.1665°N 22.7692°E
- Length: 16 km (9.9 mi)
- Basin size: 36 km^{2} (14 sq mi)

Basin features
- Progression: Crișul Alb→ Körös→ Tisza→ Danube→ Black Sea

The Junc is a right tributary of the river Crișul Alb in Romania. It discharges into the Crișul Alb near Ribița. Its length is 16 km (9.9 mi) and its basin size is 36 km^{2} (14 sq mi).
