= Vârfurile =

- Commune
- Location in Arad County

- Location in Romania
- Coordinates: 46°19′N 22°31′E
- Country: Romania
- County: Arad
- Area: 136 km^{2} (53 sq mi)
- Elevation: 231 m (758 ft)
- Population (2021-12-01): 2,246
  - Density: 16.5/km^{2} (42.8/sq mi)
- Time zone: UTC+02:00 (EET)
  - Summer (DST): UTC+03:00 (EEST)
- Vehicle reg.: AR

Vârfurile (Hungarian: Halmágycsúcs) is a commune in Arad County, Romania. It lies on the north-western part of the Hălmagiu Basin, at the feet of the Bihor and Codru-Moma Mountains. Its territory is 13600 ha in size. It is composed of eight villages: Avram Iancu (Ácsva), Groși (Halmágygóros), Lazuri (Irtványfalu), Măgulicea (Kismaglód), Mermești (Mermesd), Poiana (Csúcsmező), Vârfurile (situated at 128 km from Arad) and Vidra.

== Population ==
According to the last census, the population of the commune counts 3298 inhabitants, of which 98.9% are Romanians, 1.0% are Roms and 0.1% are of other or undeclared nationalities.

== History ==
The first documentary record of the locality Vârfurile dates back to 1390. The other settlements were attested documentary as it follows: Avram Iancu in 1956, Groși in 1760, Lazuri in 1427, Măgulicea in 1427, Mermești in 1760, Poiana in 1510 and Vidra in 1477.

== Economy ==
Although the economy of the commune is mainly agrarian, based on livestock-breeding and olericulture, logging, conversion of timber, lumbering industry and industry of building materials are also well represented.

== Tourism ==
Tourism is an economic branch that has undergone an ascendant development through the promotion of rural tourism in the past few years. Possessing an extremely attractive natural fond and a rich ethno-folkloric potential, Vârfurile commune can be called a significant touristic place of the county. Among the main tourist sights we can mention the wooden church in Groși - architectural monument dating from 1907, the wooden church in Vidra built in 1784 and the wooden church in Poiana dating back to 1751. An annually organized ethno-folkloric manifestation called "Nedeia de la Tăcășele" takes place in Avram Iancu.
