= Șicula =

- Commune
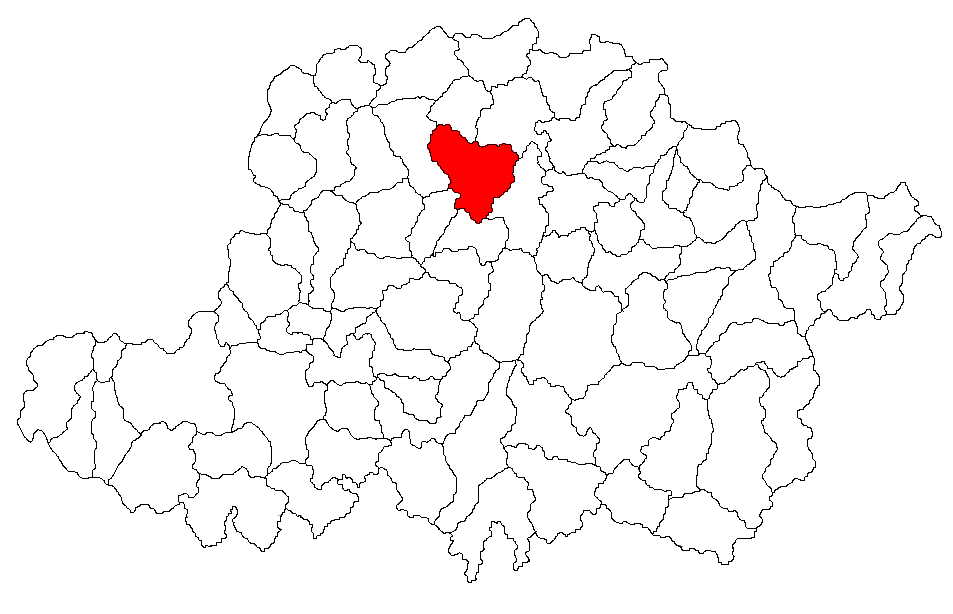
- Location in Arad County

- Location in Romania
- Coordinates: 46°26′N 21°45′E
- Country: Romania
- County: Arad

Government
  - Mayor (2020–2024): Mircea Adrian Danciu (PSD)
- Area: 131.3 km^{2} (50.7 sq mi)
- Elevation: 101 m (331 ft)
- Population (2021-12-01): 4,002
  - Density: 30/km^{2} (79/sq mi)
- Time zone: EET/EEST (UTC+2/+3)
- Postal code: 317325
- Area code: (+40) 02 57
- Vehicle reg.: AR
- Website: sicula.ro

Șicula (Hungarian: Sikula) is a commune in Arad County, Romania. It is composed of three villages: Chereluș (Kerülős), Gurba (Garba), and Șicula.

The commune is situated on the southern part of the Teuz Plateau, and is traversed by the Crișul Alb and Teuz rivers. Șicula stretches over 13,130 ha (50.7 sq mi). It is a significant road junction of Arad County, located 51 km (32 mi) from the county capital, Arad. The Crișul Alb Valley is well-known for its rich flora and fauna.

== Demographics ==
At the 2021 census, Șicula had a population of 4,002. At the 2011 census, the commune has 4,301 inhabitants, out of which 95.79% were Romanians and 1.35% were Roma.

== History ==
The first documentary records of Șicula and Chereluș date back to 1334, while Gurba was first mentioned in 1213.

== Natives ==
- Avram Bunaciu (1909–1983), communist politician and jurist
- Ioan Flueraș (1882–1953), social democratic politician and a victim of the communist regime
