= Buceș =

- Commune
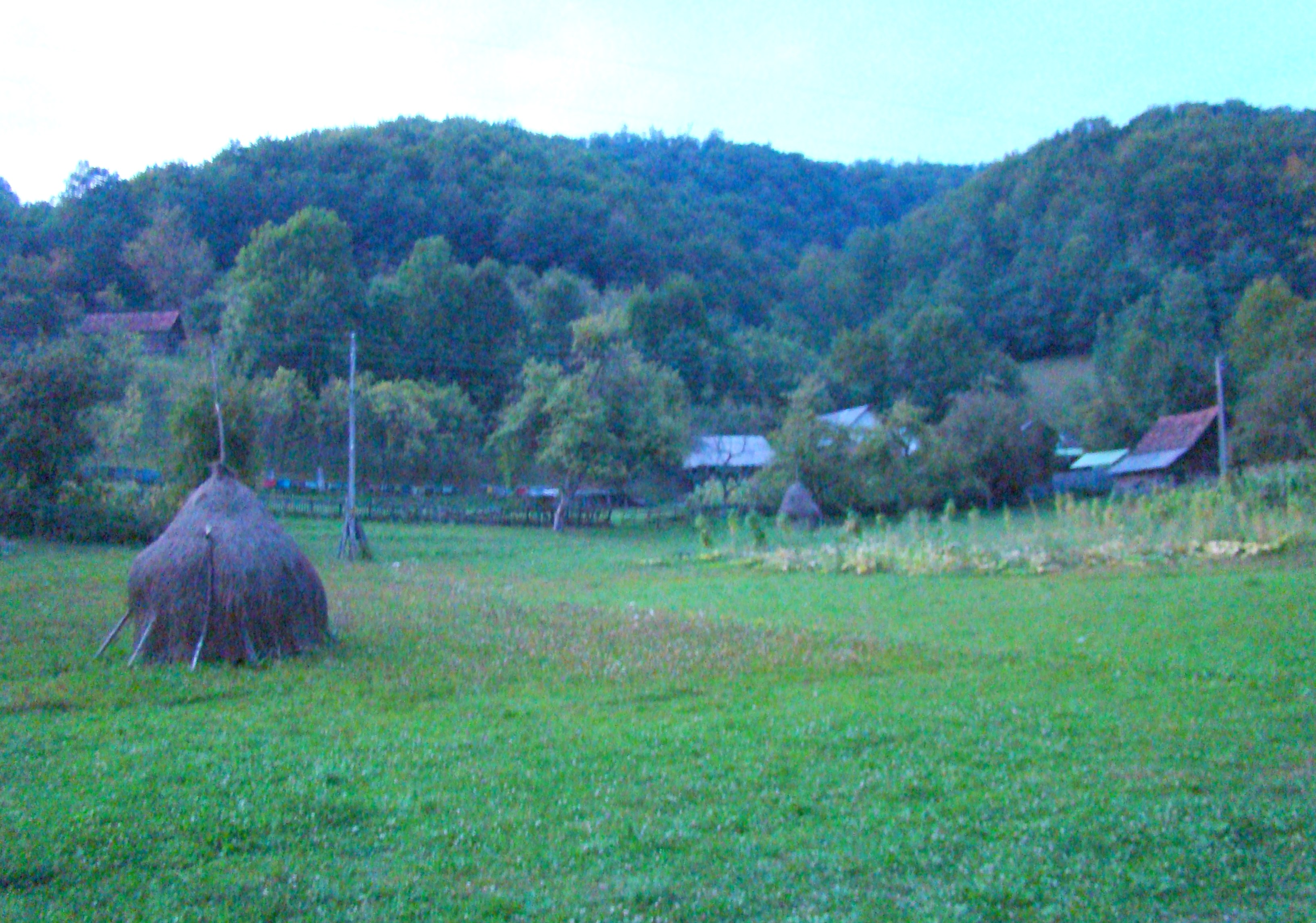
- Rural landscape from Stănija

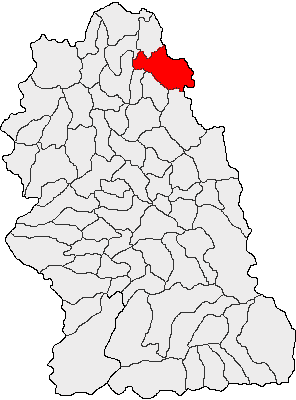
- Location in Hunedoara County

- Location in Romania
- Coordinates: 46°11′N 22°56′E
- Country: Romania
- County: Hunedoara

Government
  - Mayor (2024–2028): Traian Achim-Mărcuș (PNL)
- Area: 122.63 km^{2} (47.35 sq mi)
- Elevation: 361 m (1,184 ft)
- Population (2021-12-01): 1,595
  - Density: 13.01/km^{2} (33.69/sq mi)
- Time zone: UTC+02:00 (EET)
  - Summer (DST): UTC+03:00 (EEST)
- Postal code: 337135
- Area code: (+40) 0254
- Vehicle reg.: HD
- Website: www.buces.ro

Buceș (Hungarian: Bucsesd) is a commune in Hunedoara County, Transylvania, Romania. It is composed of seven villages: Buceș, Buceș-Vulcan, Dupăpiatră (Dupapiátra), Grohoțele, Mihăileni (Miheleny), Stănija (Sztanizsa), and Tarnița.

Historical population
Year	Pop.	±%
1850	3,939	—
1910	4,838	+22.8%
2002	2,381	−50.8%
2011	1,961	−17.6%
2021	1,595	−18.7%
Source: Census data

At the 2021 census, the commune had a population of 1,595; of those, 88.6% were Romanians and 5.4% Roma.

== Gallery ==
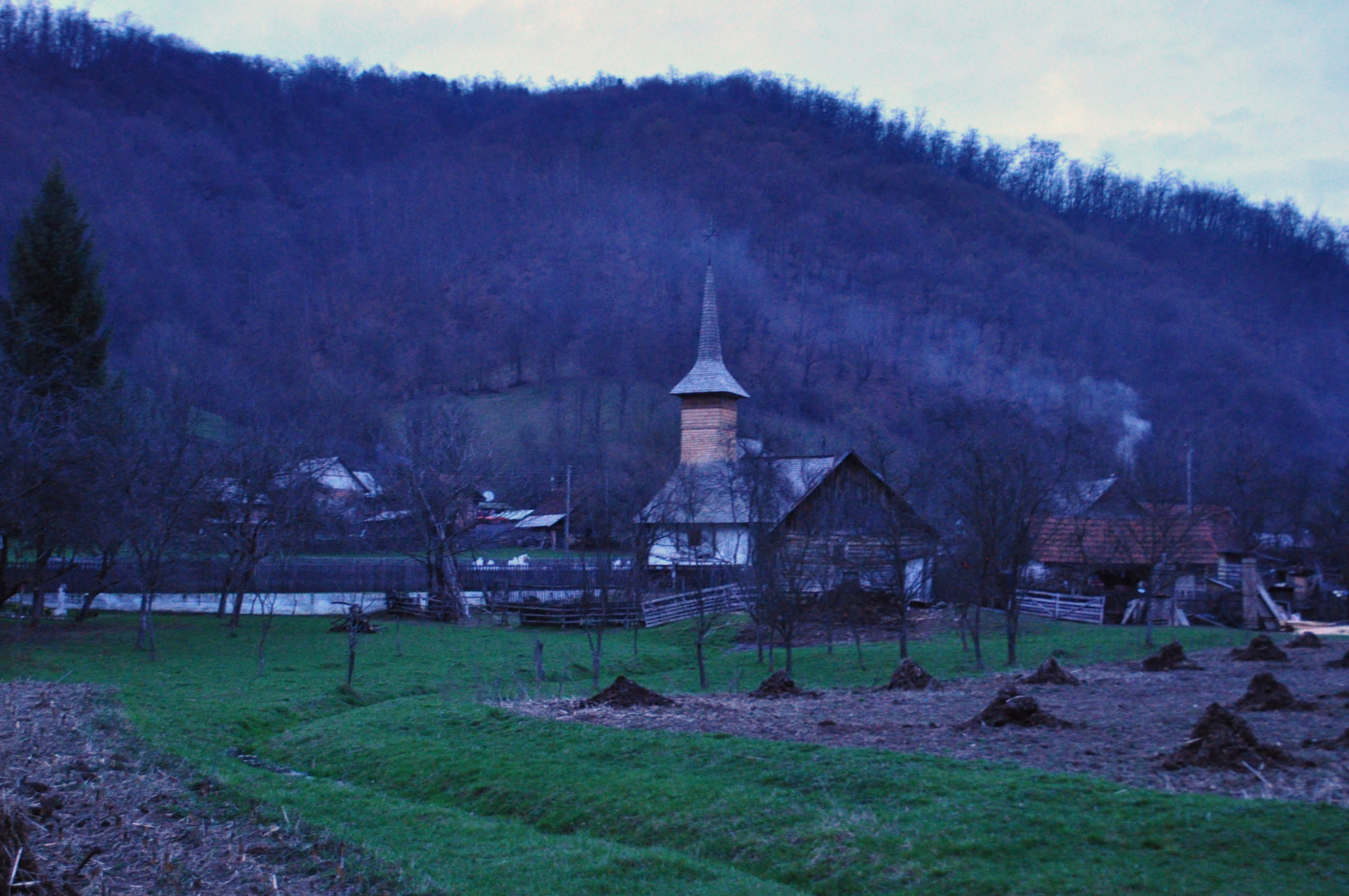
Wooden church in Stănija

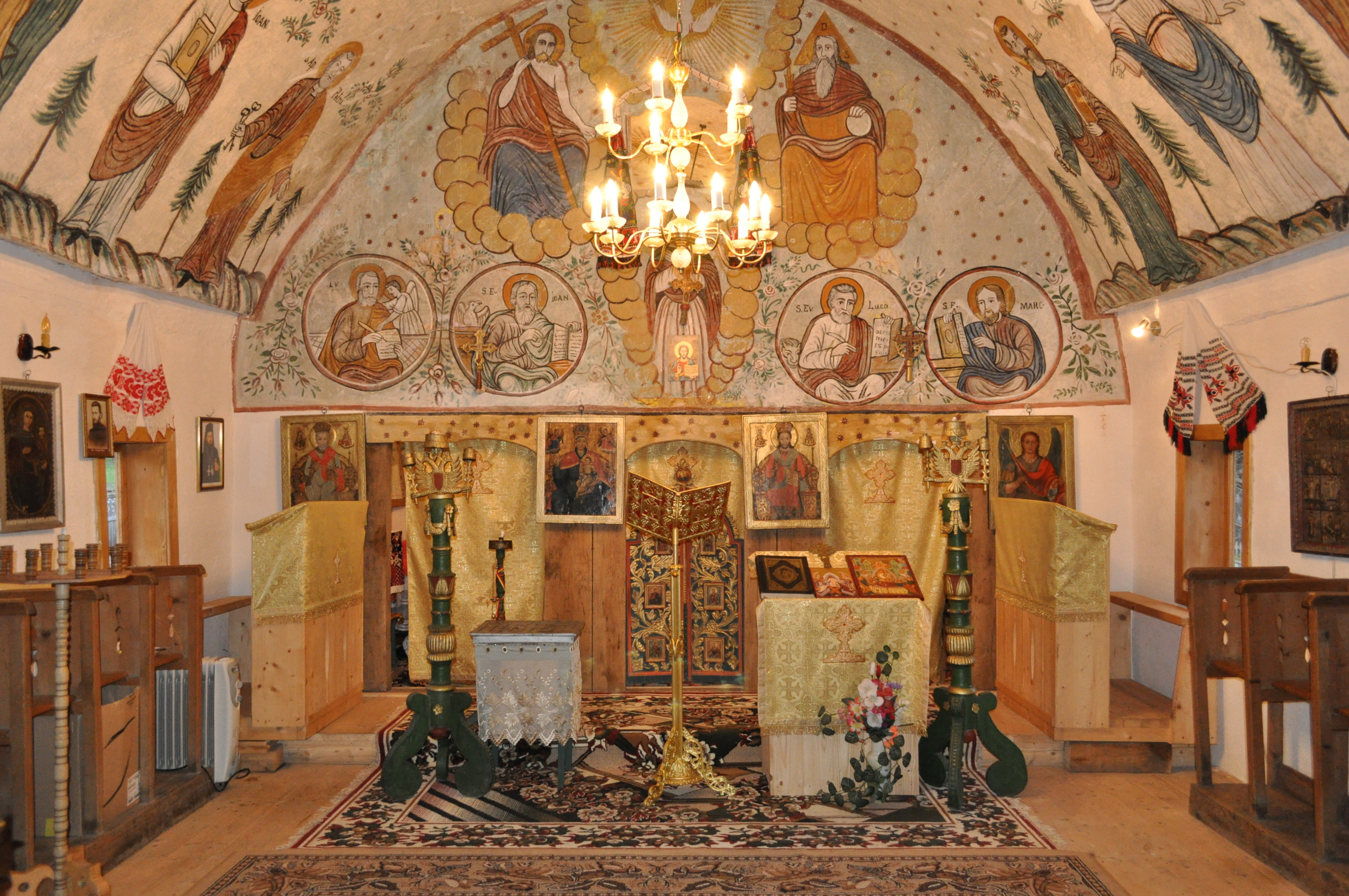
Interior of the wooden church from Stănija

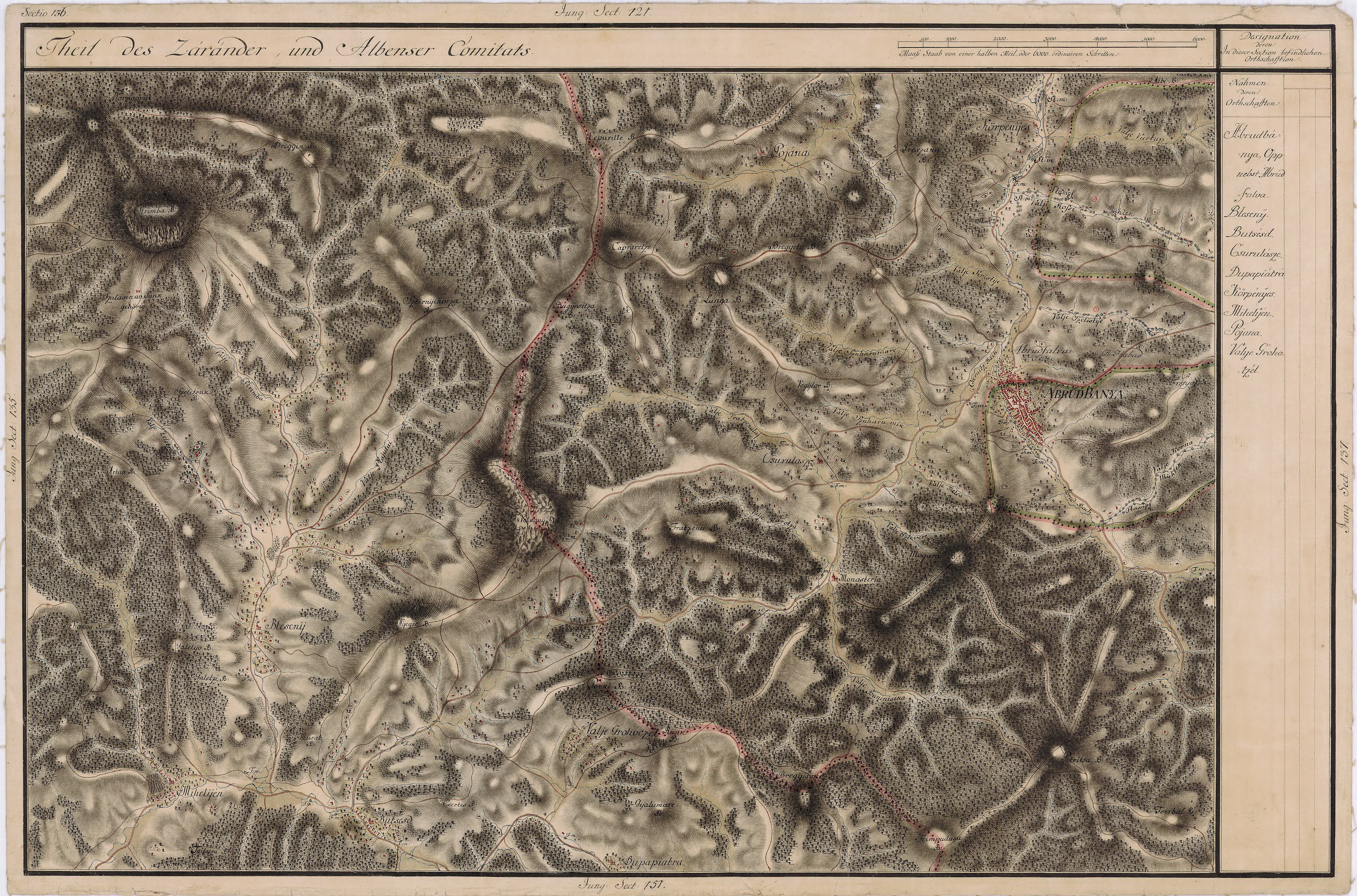
Buceș in the Josephinische Landesaufnahme cadastral maps, 1769-72

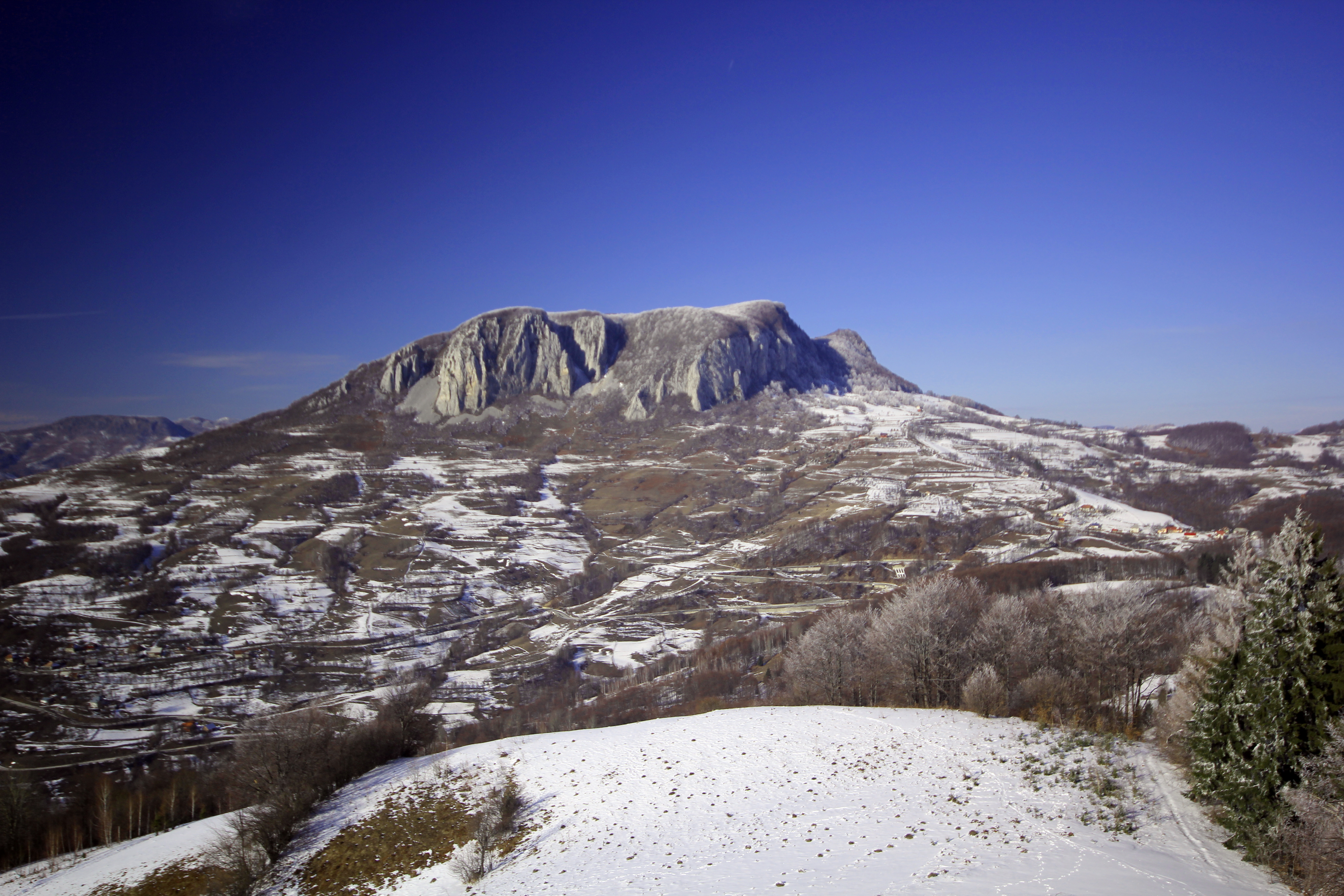
Vulcan Mountain seen from Buceș

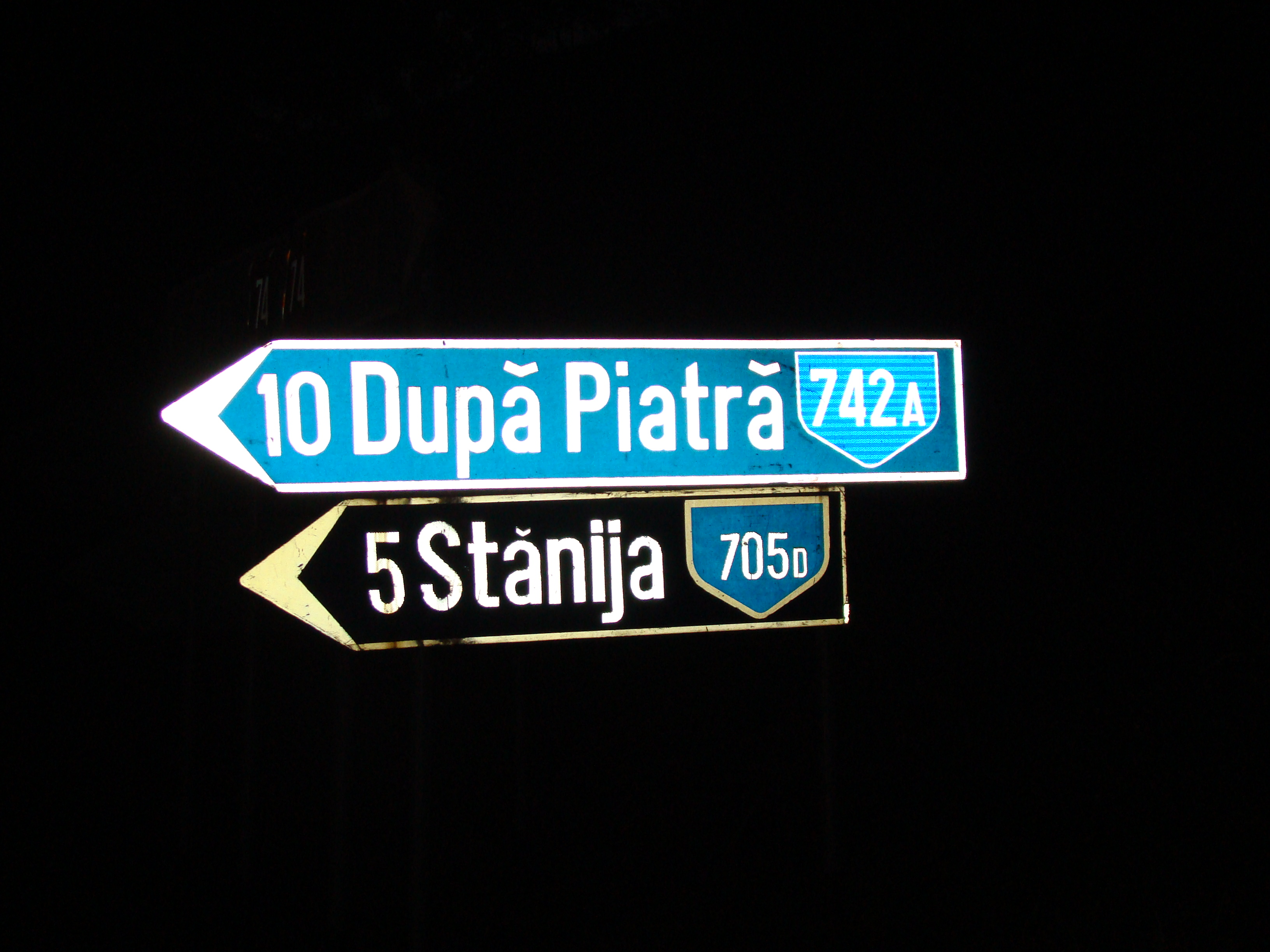
Road sign near Stănija and Dupăpiatră

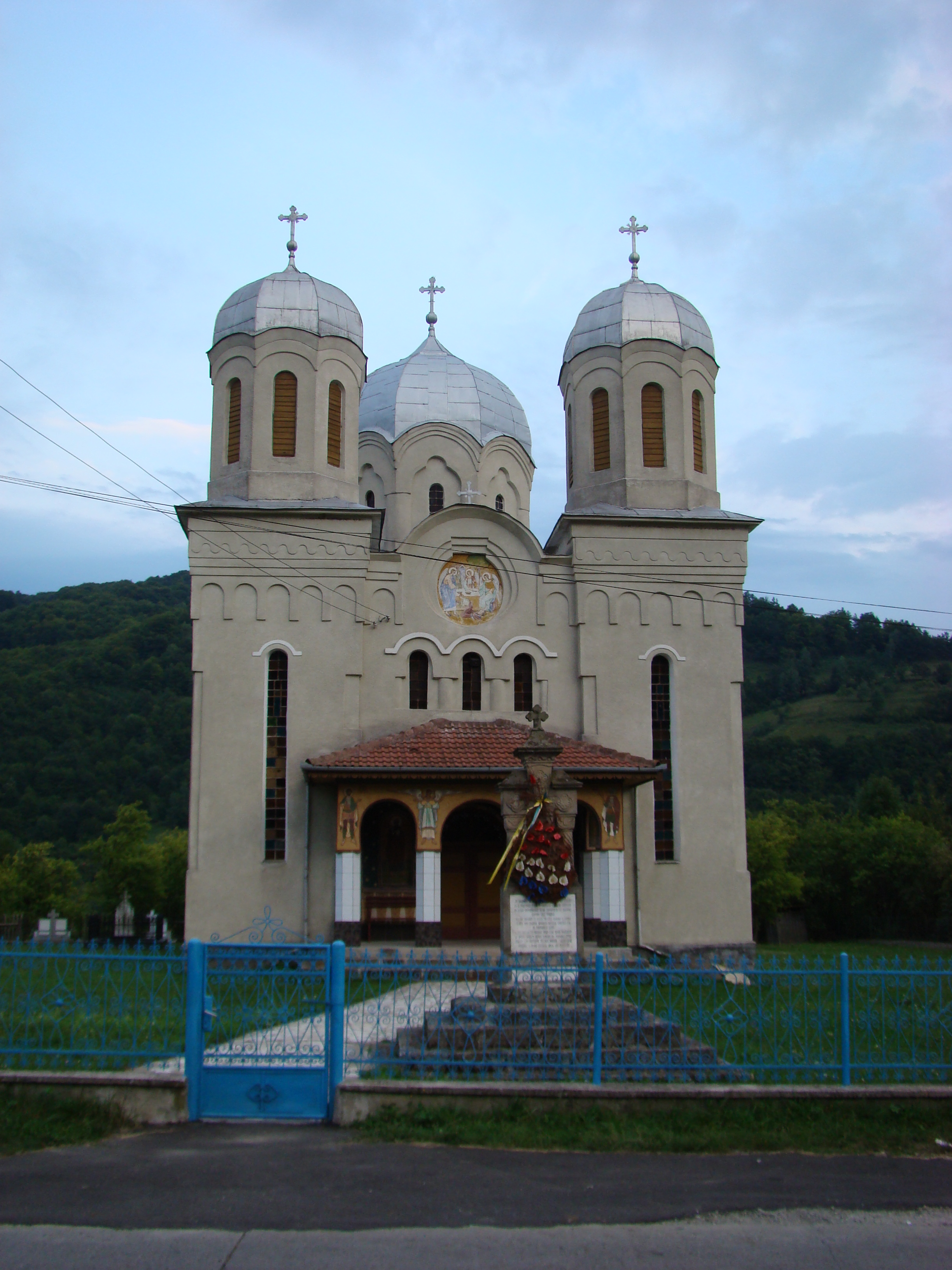
Orthodox church in Mihăileni

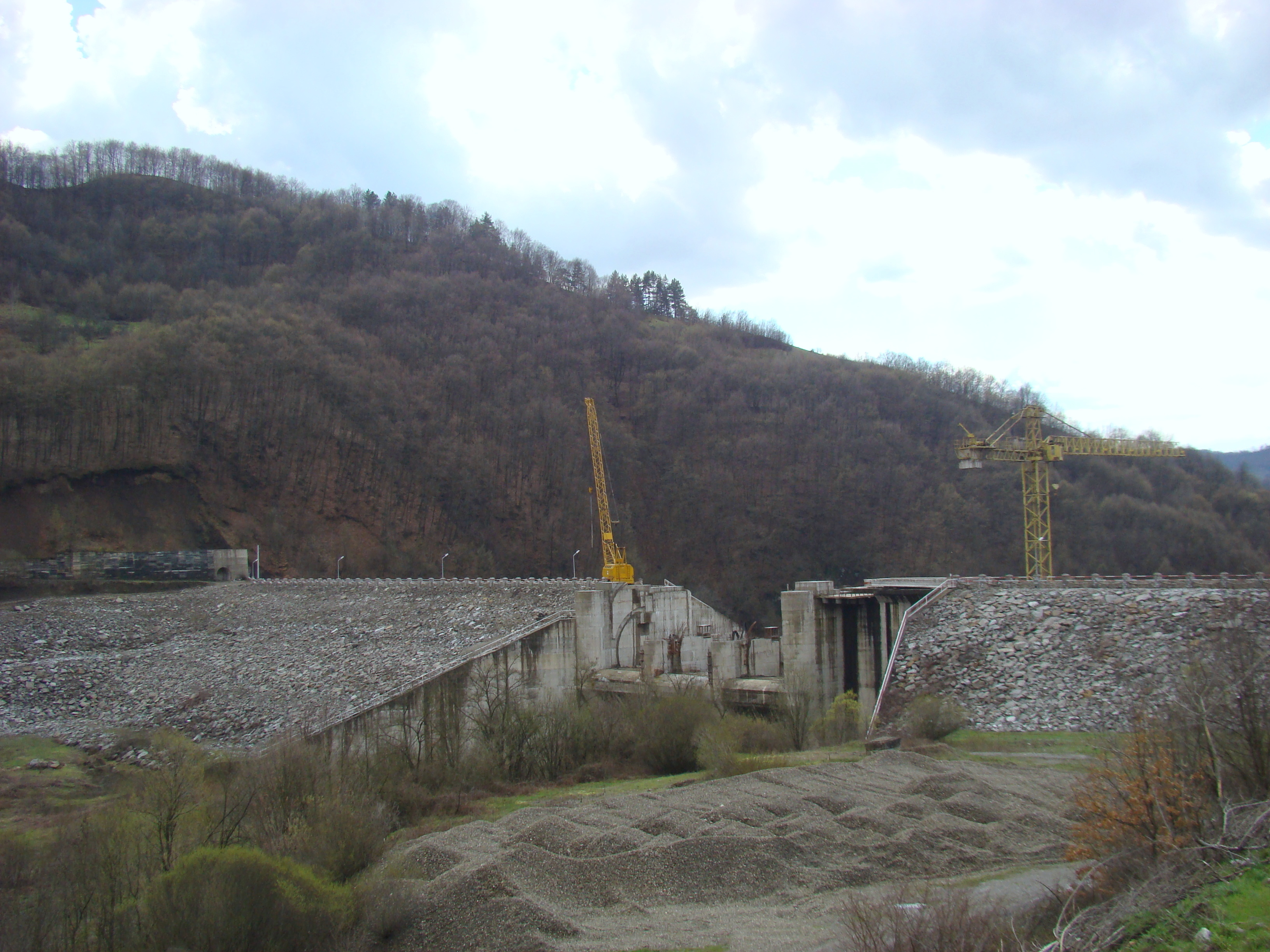
Mihăileni Dam

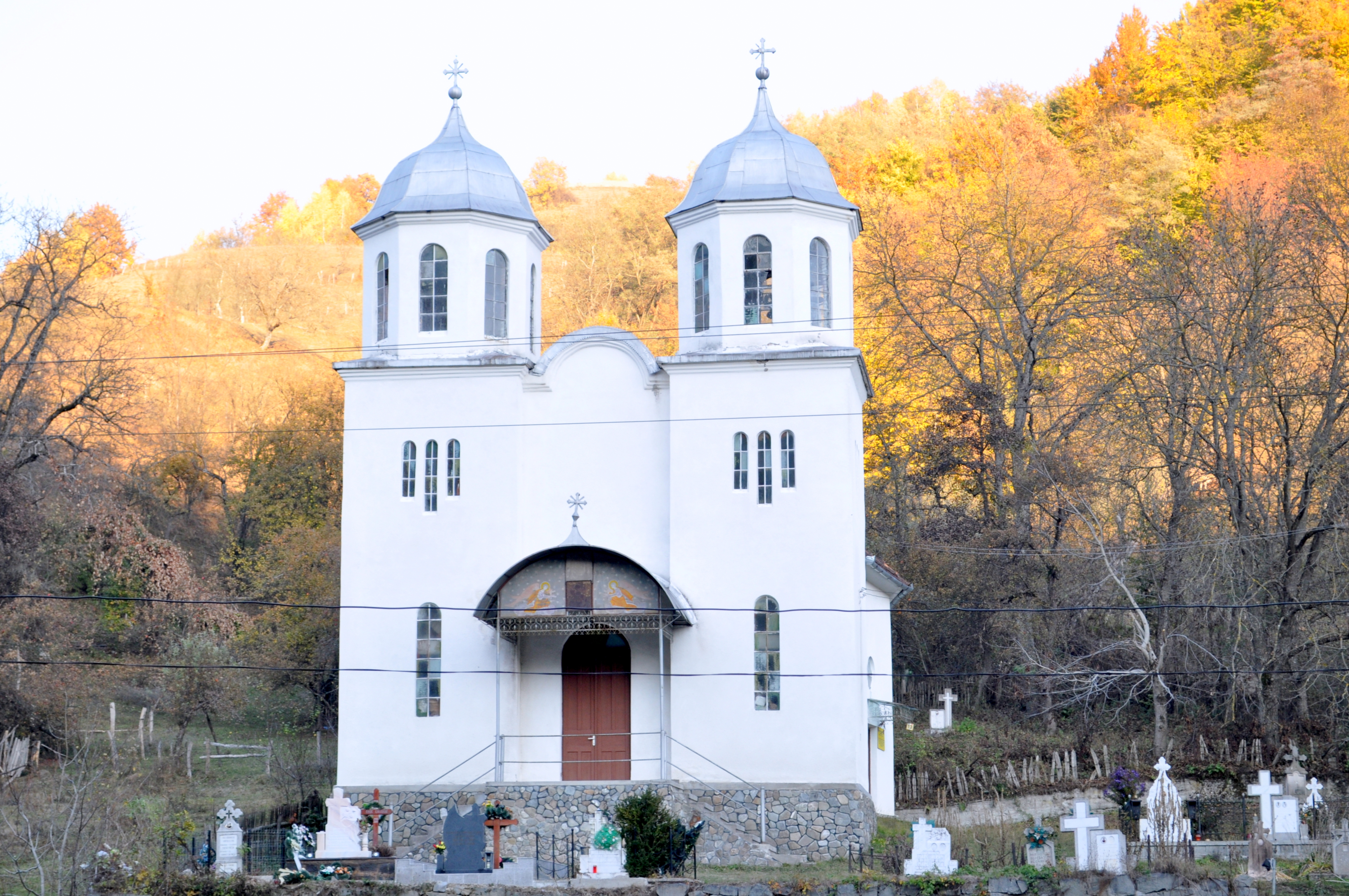
Orthodox church in Buceș-Vulcan
