= Bârsa =

- Commune
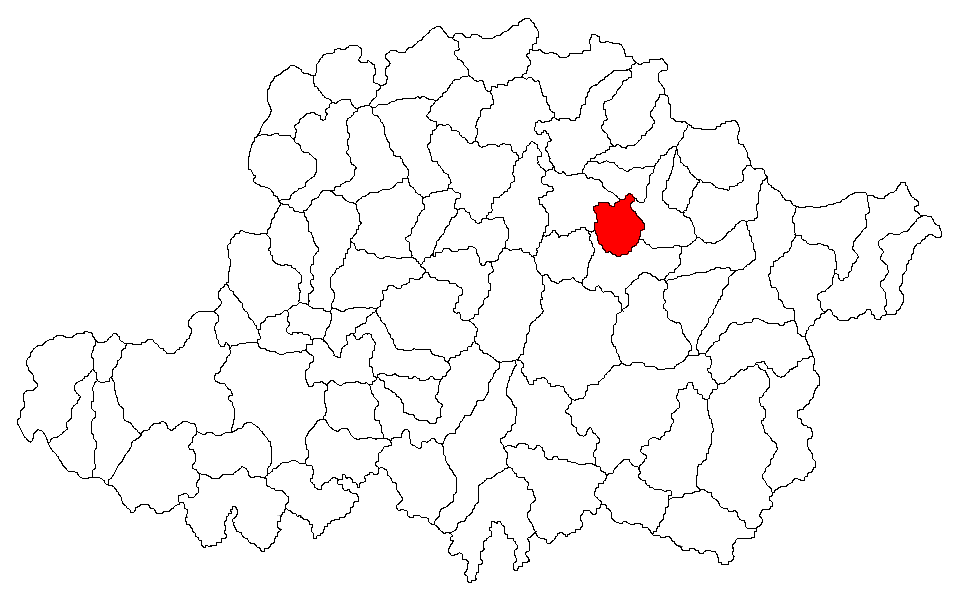
- Location in Arad County

- Location in Romania
- Coordinates: 46°22′N 22°4′E
- Country: Romania
- County: Arad
- Area: 51.47 km^{2} (19.87 sq mi)
- Population (2021-12-01): 1,623
  - Density: 32/km^{2} (82/sq mi)
- Time zone: EET/EEST (UTC+2/+3)
- Vehicle reg.: AR

Bârsa (Hungarian: Barza) is a commune in Arad County, Romania. The commune is situated in the Sebiș Basin, on the left part of the Mills Ditch and it has an administrative territory of 5174 ha. It is composed of four villages: Aldești (Áldófalva), Bârsa (situated at 77 km from Arad), Hodiș (Zarándhódos) and Voivodeni (Körösvajda).

== Population ==
According to the last census, the population of the commune counts 1920 inhabitants, out of which 97.9% are Romanians, 0.7% Hungarians, 1.1% Roma and 0.3% are of other or undeclared nationalities.

== History ==
The first documentary record of the locality Bârsa dates back to 1489. Aldești was first mentioned in documents in 1477, Hodiș in 1326 and Voivodeni in 1553.

== Economy ==
Although the economy of the commune is prevalent agricultural, the secondary and tertiary economic sectors have also developed recently. Besides agriculture, the industry of building materials is also well represented.

== Tourism ==
The exceptional touristic potential of the town includes both natural and man-made elements. The commune is well-known both in the country and abroad for the ceramic products made by local craftsmen.
