= Buteni =

- Commune
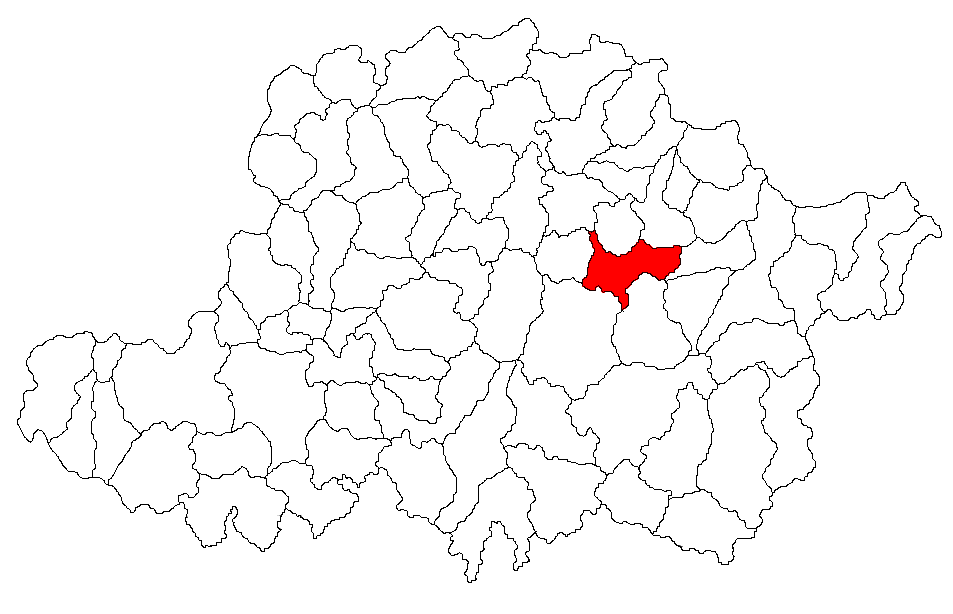
- Location in Arad County

- Location in Romania
- Coordinates: 46°19′N 22°7′E
- Country: Romania
- County: Arad
- Population (2021-12-01): 3,262
- Time zone: EET/EEST (UTC+2/+3)
- Vehicle reg.: AR

Buteni (Hungarian: Buttyin) is a commune in Arad County, Romania. The river Crișul Alb flows nearby. Buteni commune lies in the Sebiș Basin at the foot of the Cuiedului Hills. It is composed of four villages: Berindia (Borosberend), Buteni (situated at 72 km from Arad), Cuied (Köved), and Păulian (Gósd).

== Population ==
According to the last census, the population of the commune counts 3472 inhabitants with the following distribution: 97.9% Romanians, 0.7% Hungarians, 0.7% Roma, 0.3% Germans, and 0.4% Other or Undeclared Nationalities.

== History ==
The first documentary record of the locality Buteni dates back to 1387. Berindia was first mentioned in documents in 1553, Cuied in 1447, and Păulian in 1553.

== Economy ==
Although the economy of the commune is mostly agricultural, it is well known in the region also for its zootechnic sector based on sheep-farming and for its small industry. Also, it is an important center of handicrafts.

== Tourism ==
In the future, tourism can become a dominant economical branch. The archaeological site in Berindia, the traditional occupations and handicrafts, the costumes and products made by hand, and the development of agro-tourism can turn the commune into an area with exceptional tourist attraction.
