= Baia de Criș =

- Commune
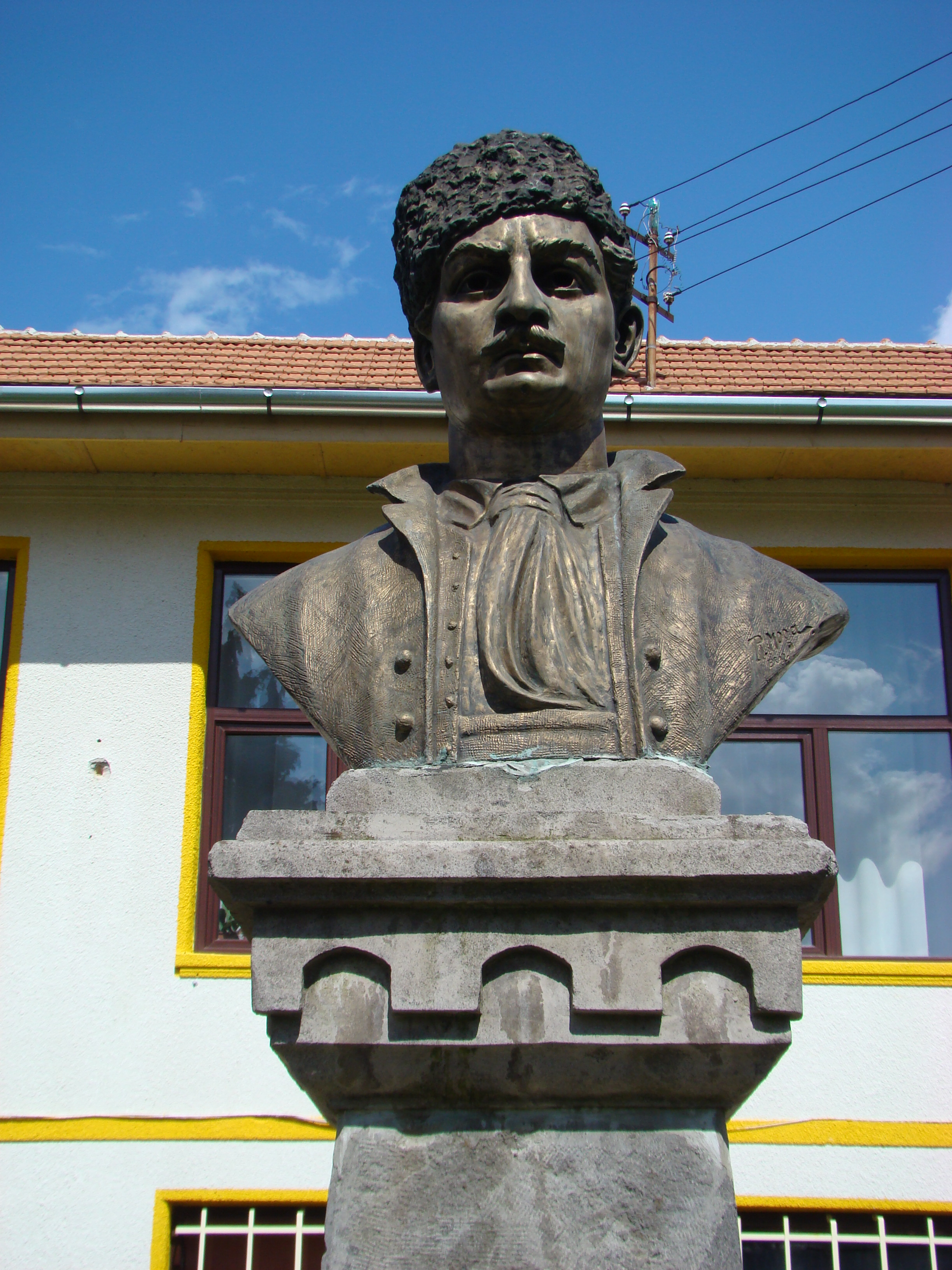
- Bust of Avram Iancu in Baia de Criș

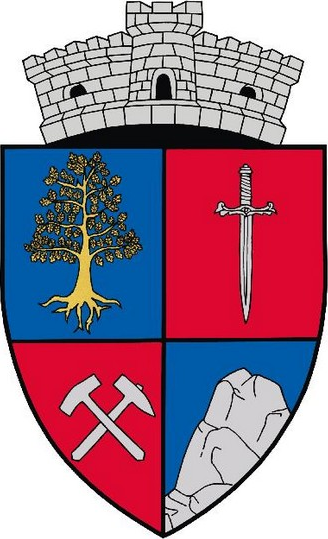
- Coat of arms

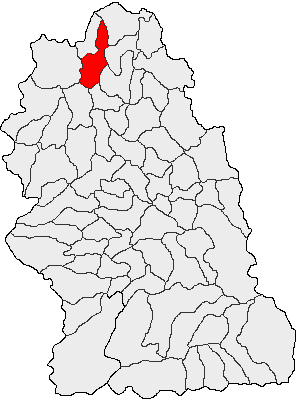
- Location in Hunedoara County

- Location in Romania
- Coordinates: 46°10′N 22°43′E
- Country: Romania
- County: Hunedoara

Government
  - Mayor (2020–2024): Mihaiu Liviu Gorcea (PSD)
- Area: 89.72 km^{2} (34.64 sq mi)
- Elevation: 250 m (820 ft)
- Population (2021-12-01): 2,176
  - Density: 24.25/km^{2} (62.82/sq mi)
- Time zone: UTC+02:00 (EET)
  - Summer (DST): UTC+03:00 (EEST)
- Postal code: 337005
- Area code: +40 x54
- Vehicle reg.: HD
- Website: www.baia-de-cris.ro

Baia de Criș (German: Altenburg; Hungarian: Körösbánya) is a commune in Hunedoara County, Crișana, Romania, close to the small town of Brad. It is composed of nine villages: Baia de Criș, Baldovin (Báldovin), Căraci (Karács), Cărăstău (Karasztó), Lunca (Lunka), Rișca (Riska), Rișculița (Riskulica), Țebea (Cebe), and Văleni.

The village of Țebea is where the Revolt of Horea, Cloșca and Crișan started in 1784, and marks the death place and burial site of Avram Iancu.

The village of Lunca Moților keeps the wooden Church of the Assumption, with good folk paintings by master Nicolae (1829), from Lupșa Mare, in the interior. The building now belongs to the National Museum of the Romanian Peasant.

At the 2021 census, the commune had a population of 2,176, of which 91.18% were Romanians.

Historical population
Year	Pop.	±%
1850	4,288	—
1920	4,880	+13.8%
1941	5,398	+10.6%
1977	4,574	−15.3%
2002	3,031	−33.7%
2011	2,611	−13.9%
2021	2,176	−16.7%
Source: Census data

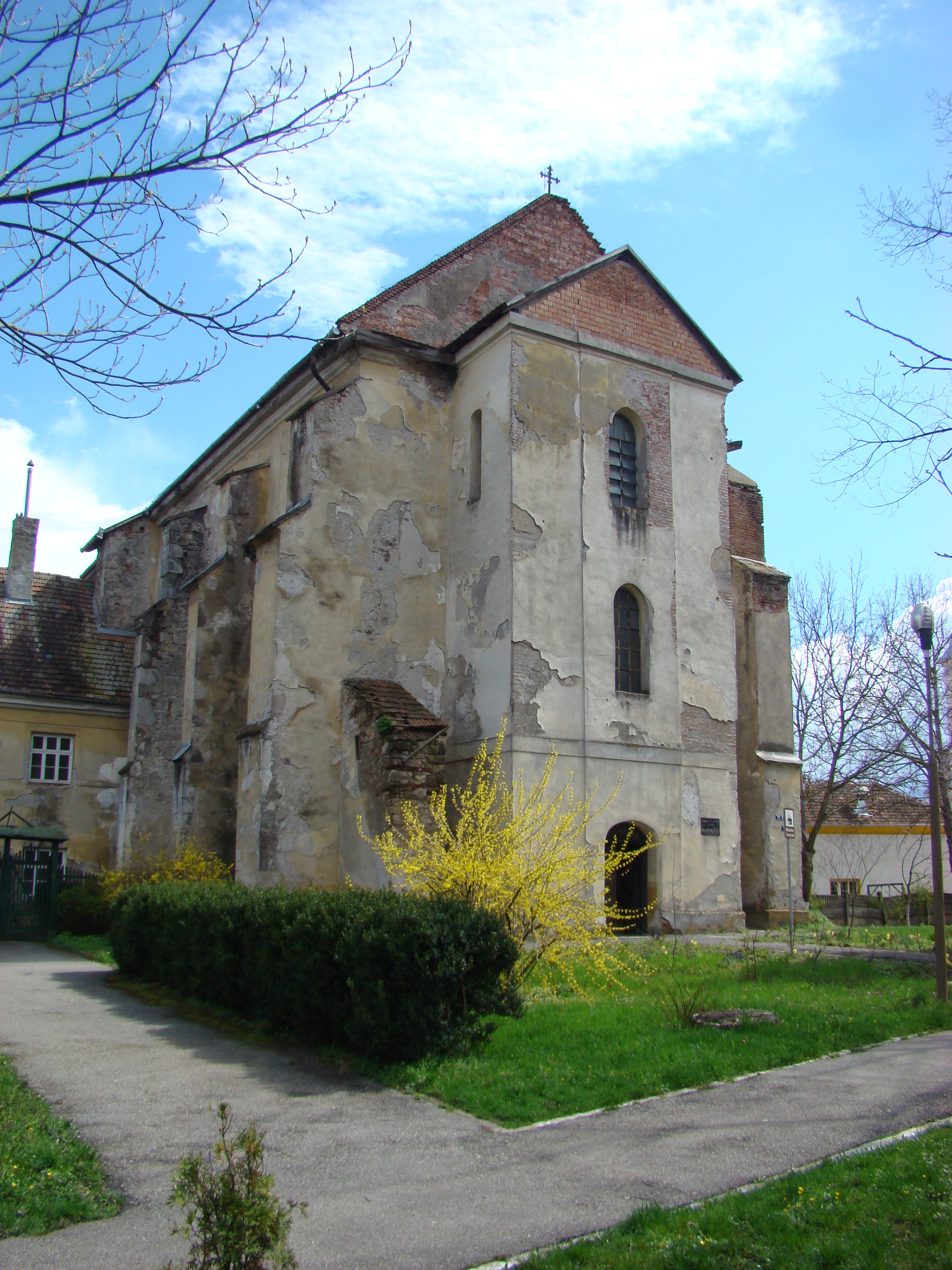
Franciscan monastery of Baia de Criș, founded in the 14th century

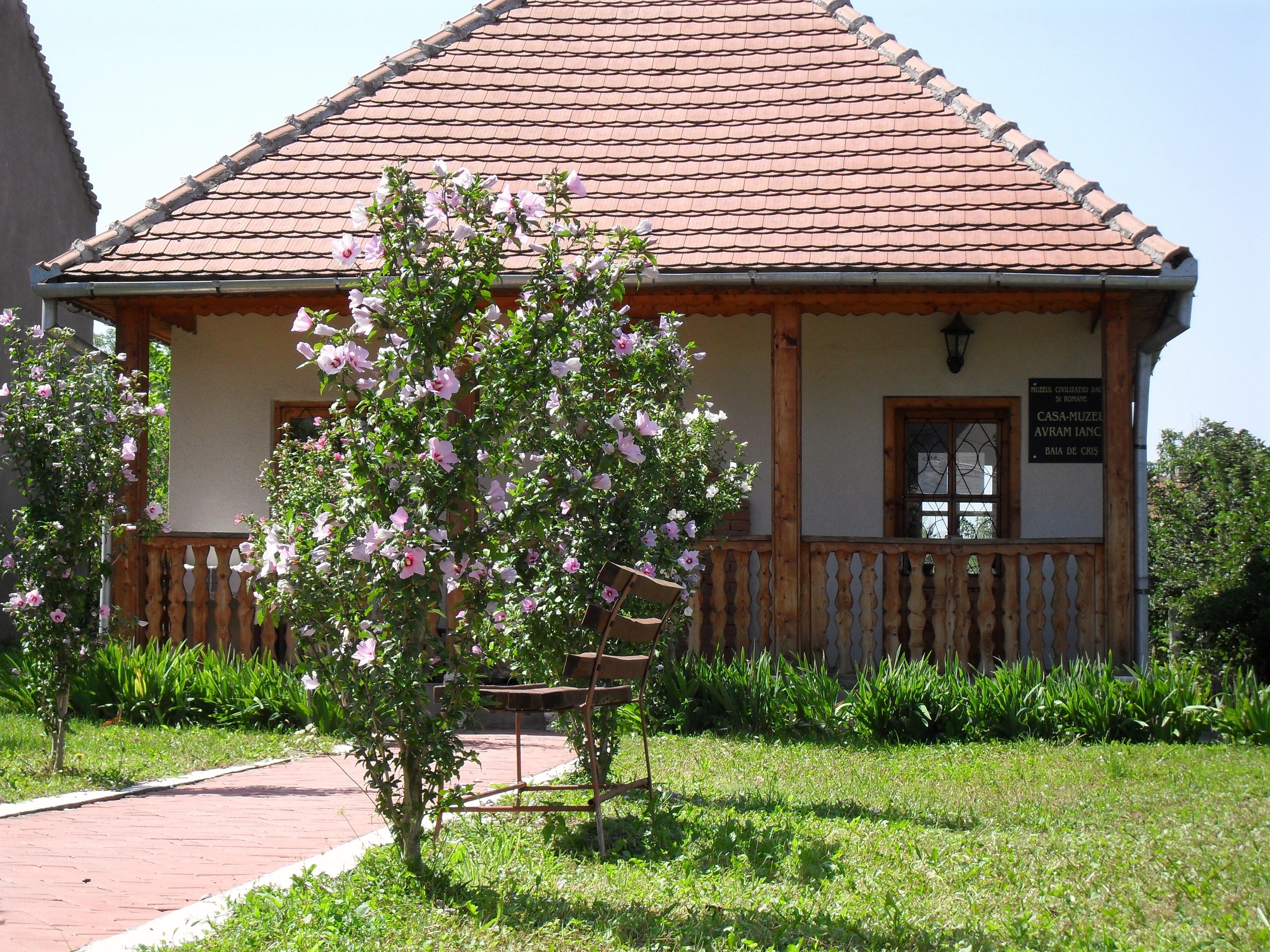
Baia de Criș

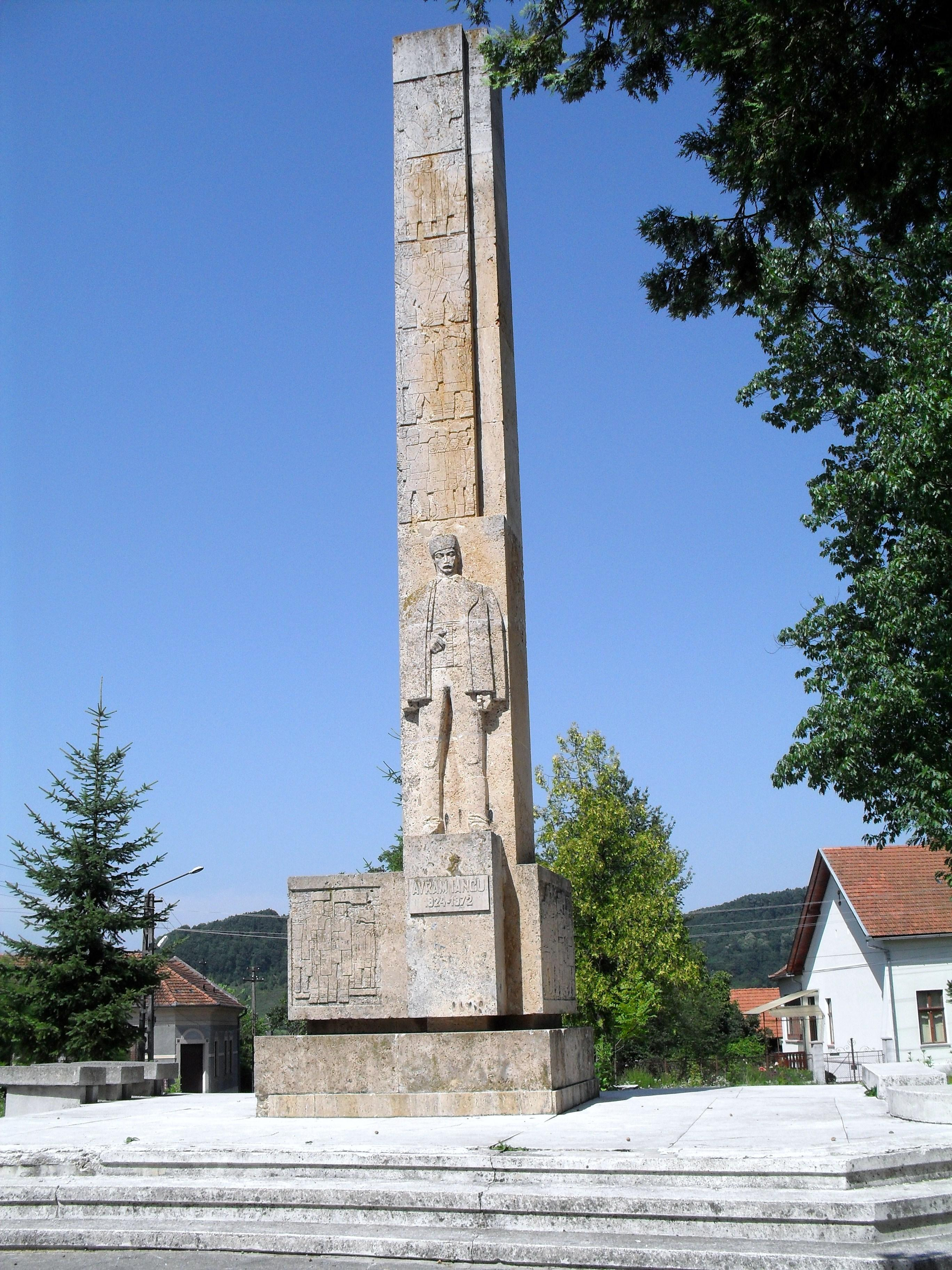
Baia de Criș

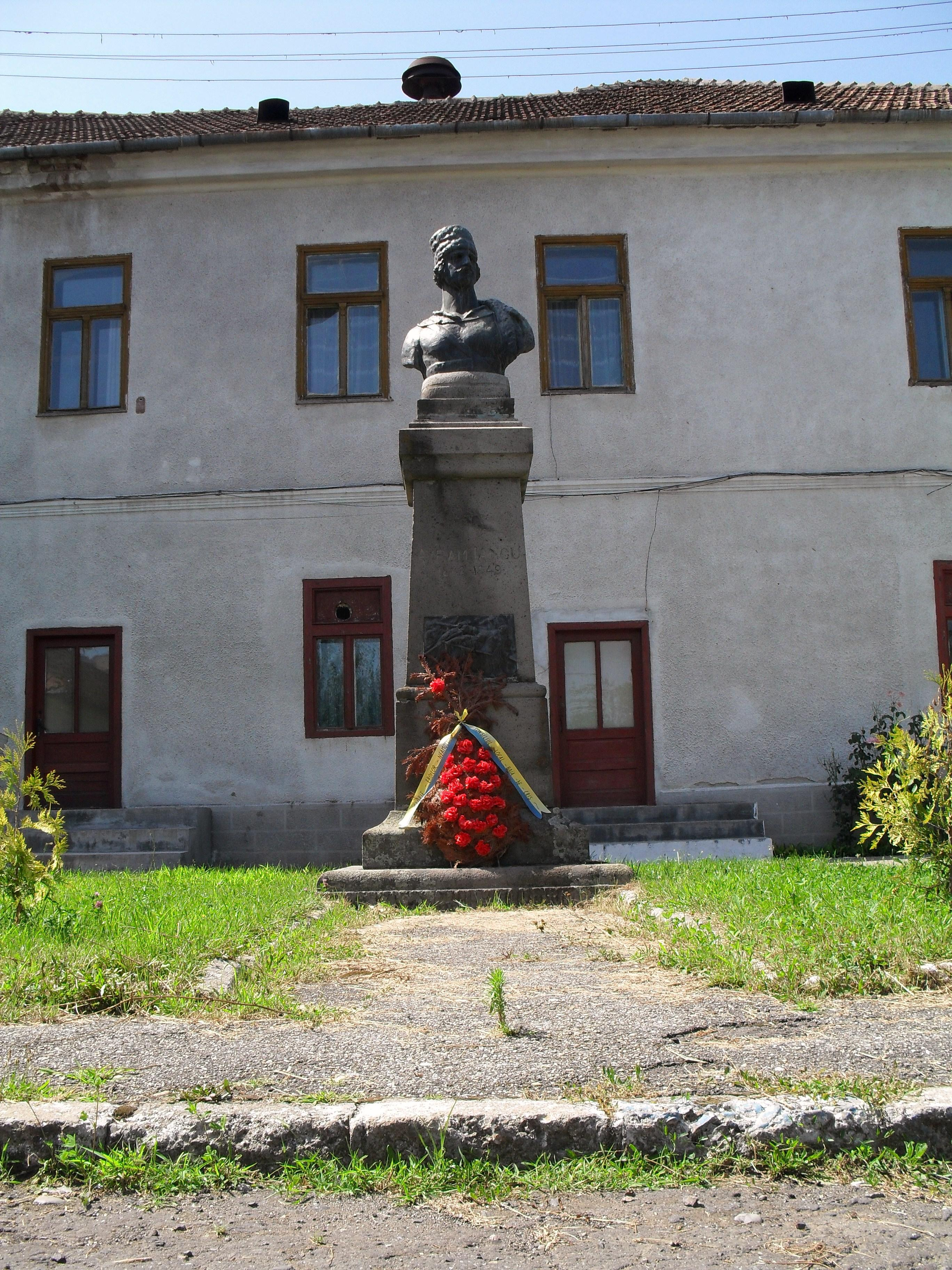
Baia de Criș

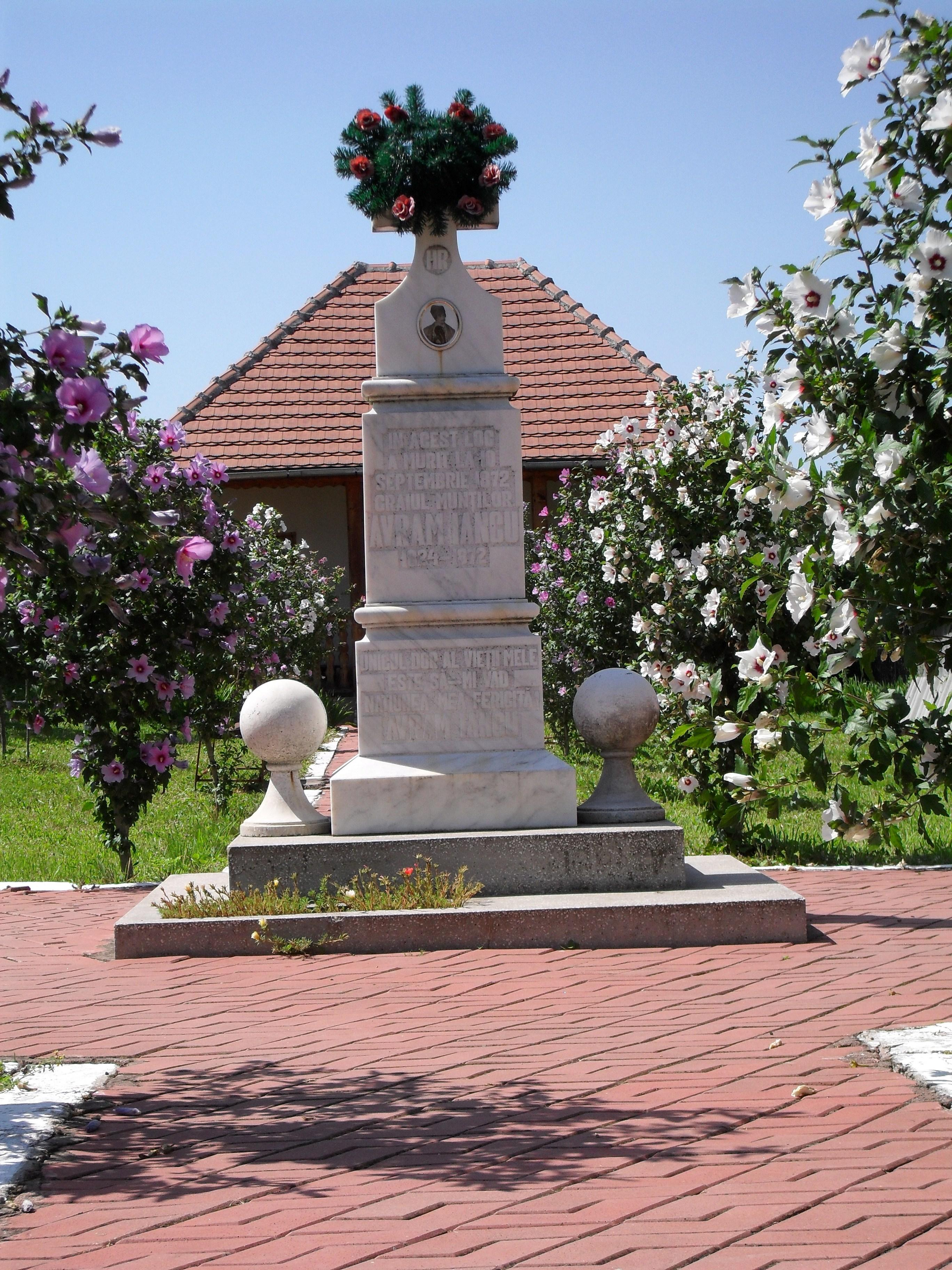
Baia de Criș

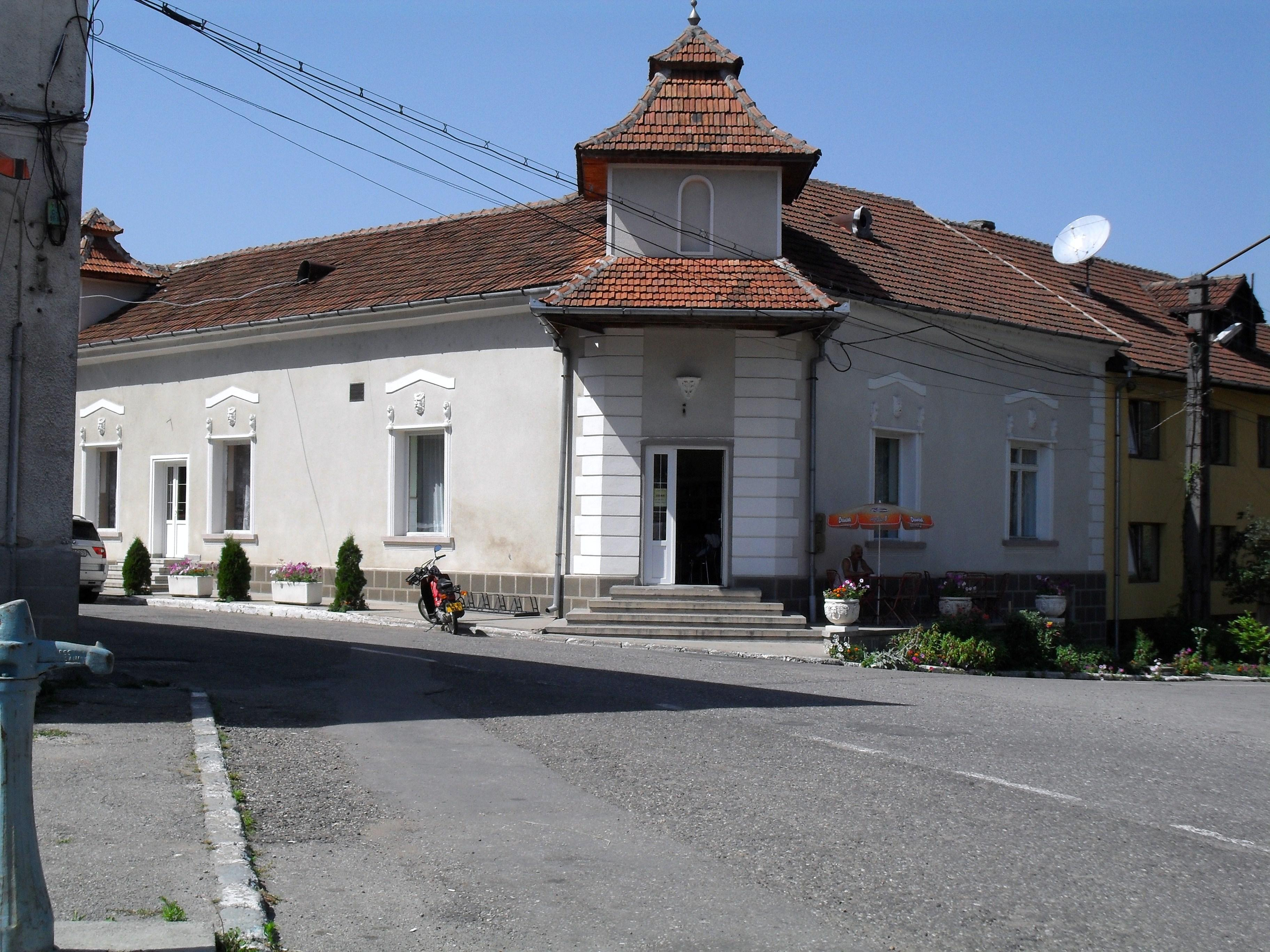
Baia de Criș

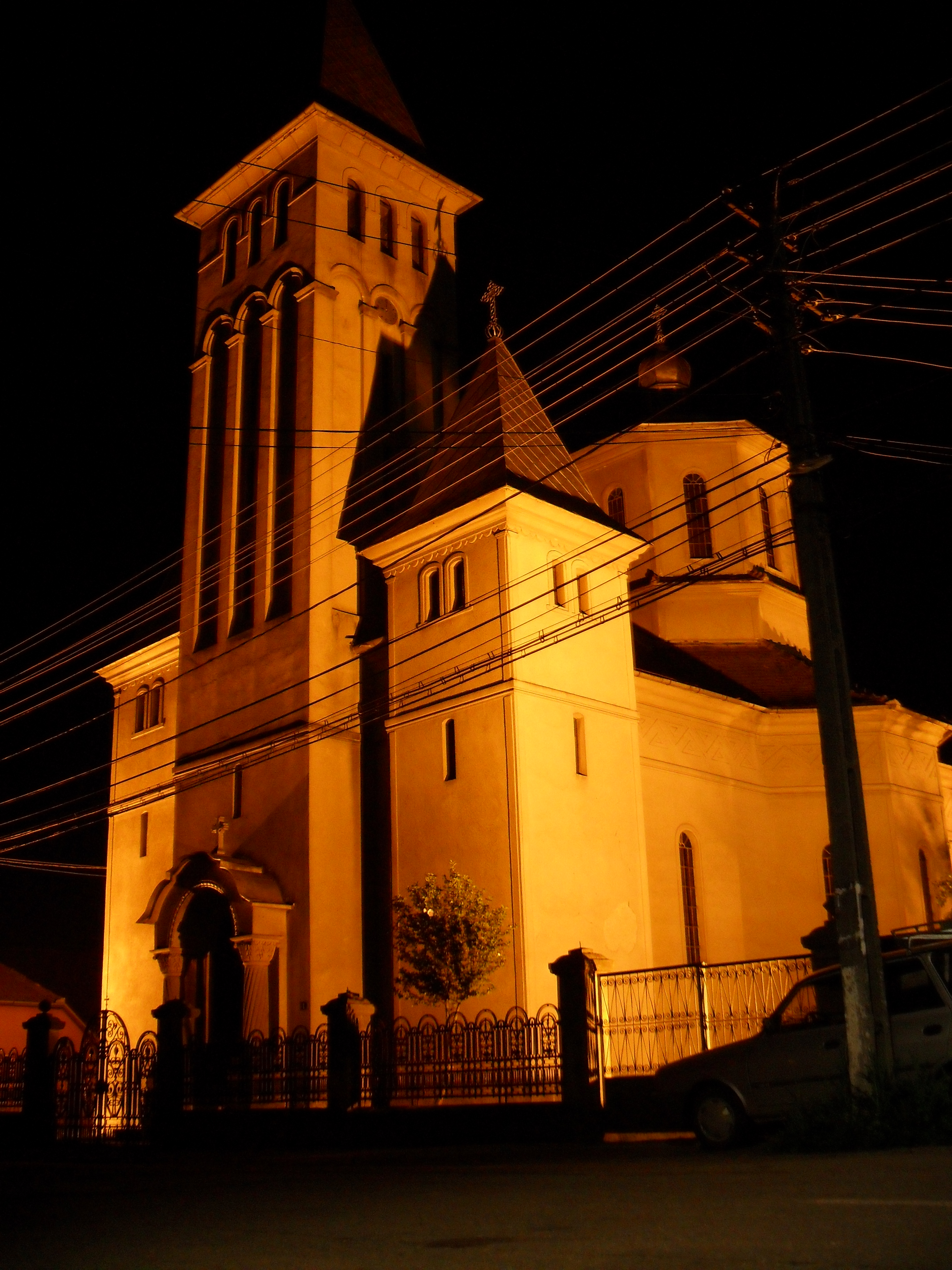
Baia de Criș

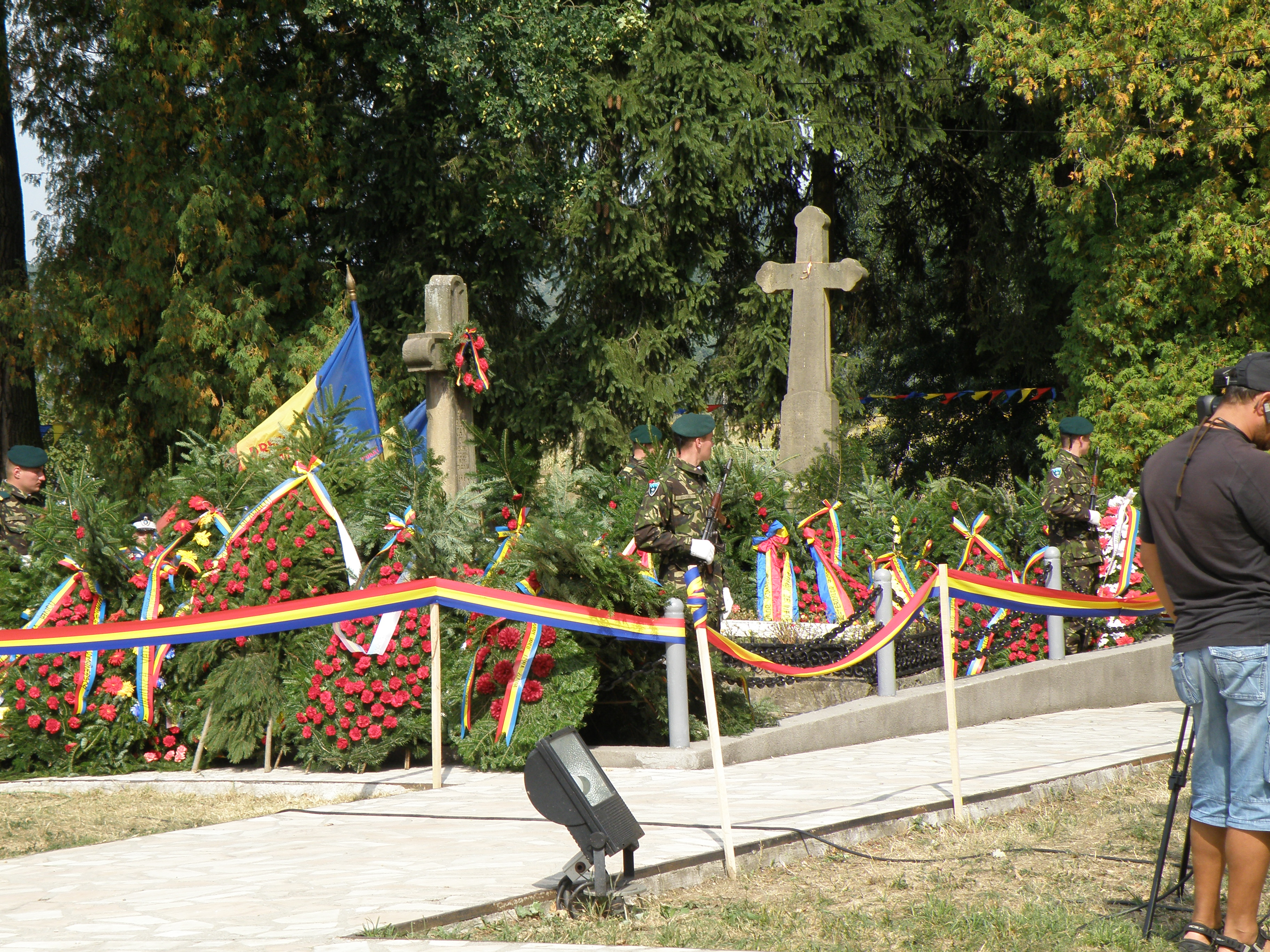
Țebea

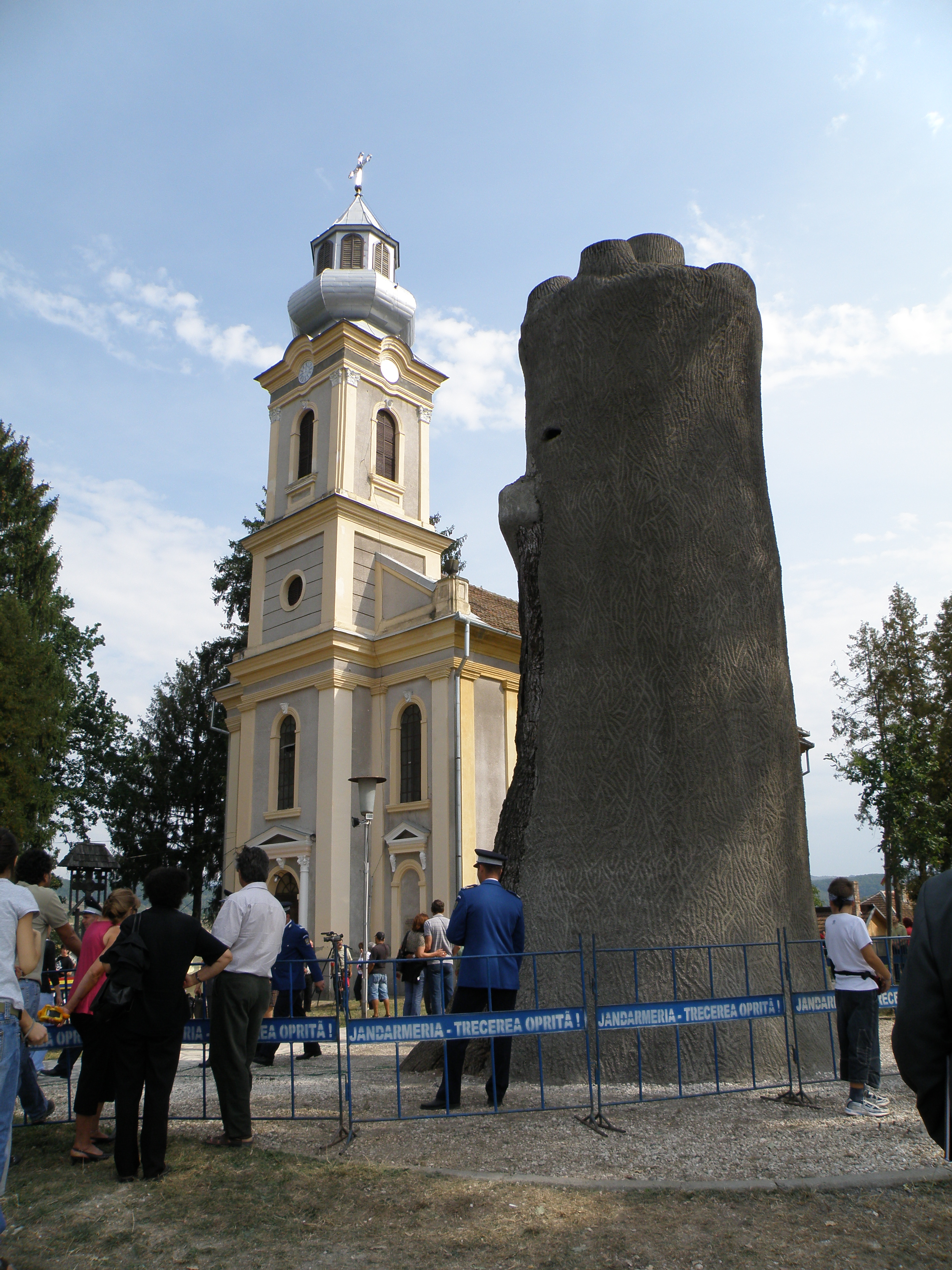
Țebea

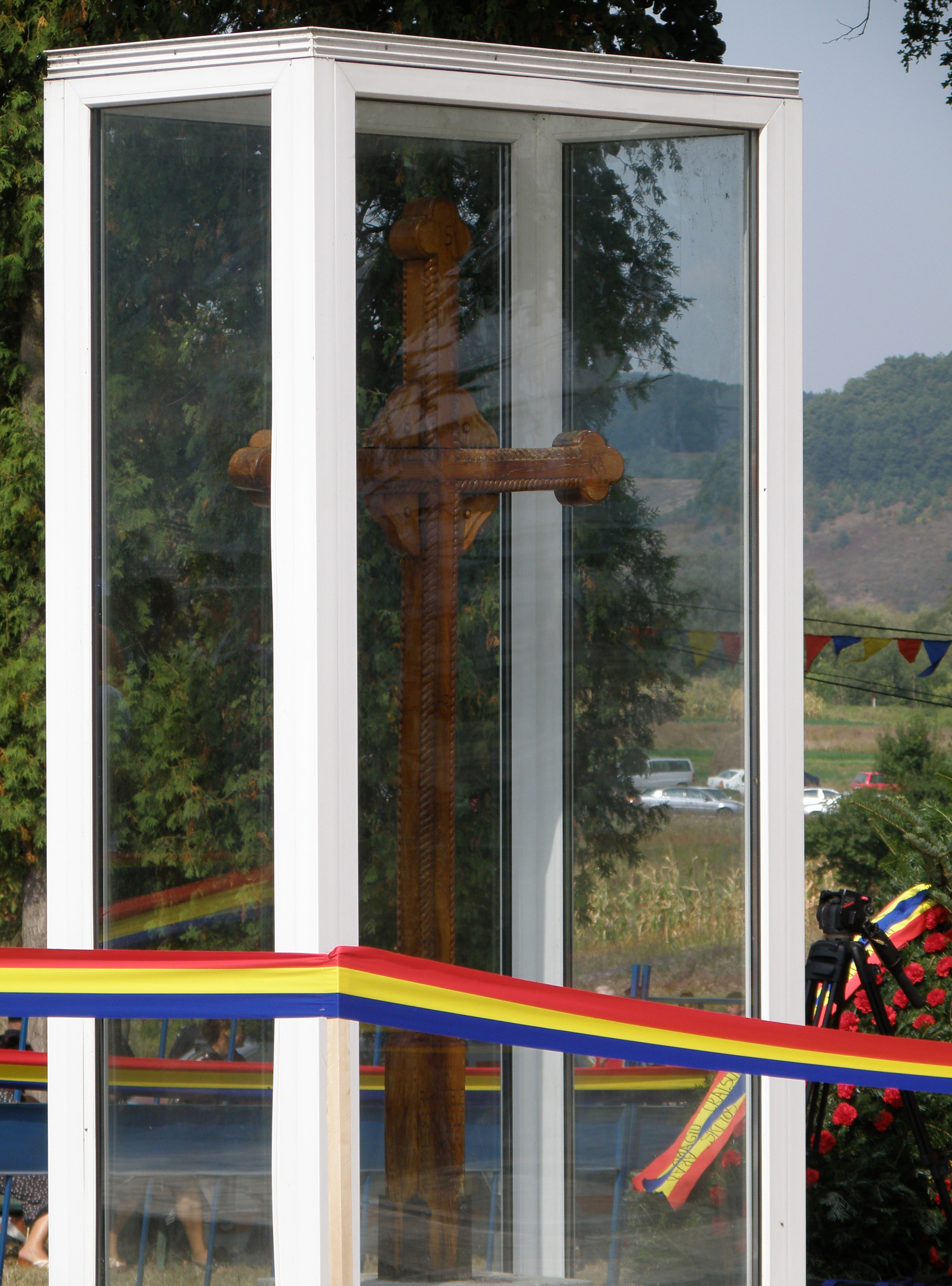
Țebea

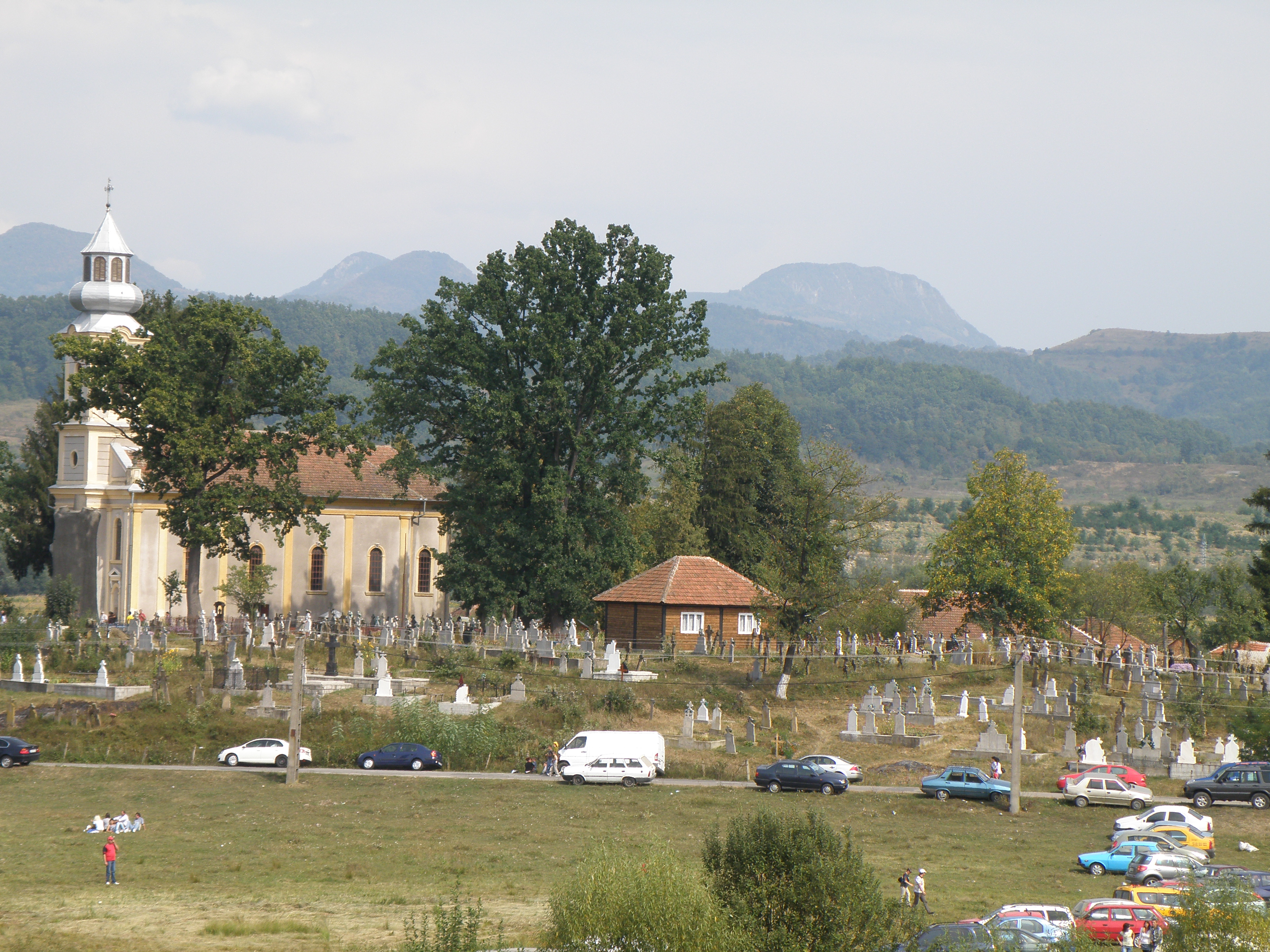
Țebea

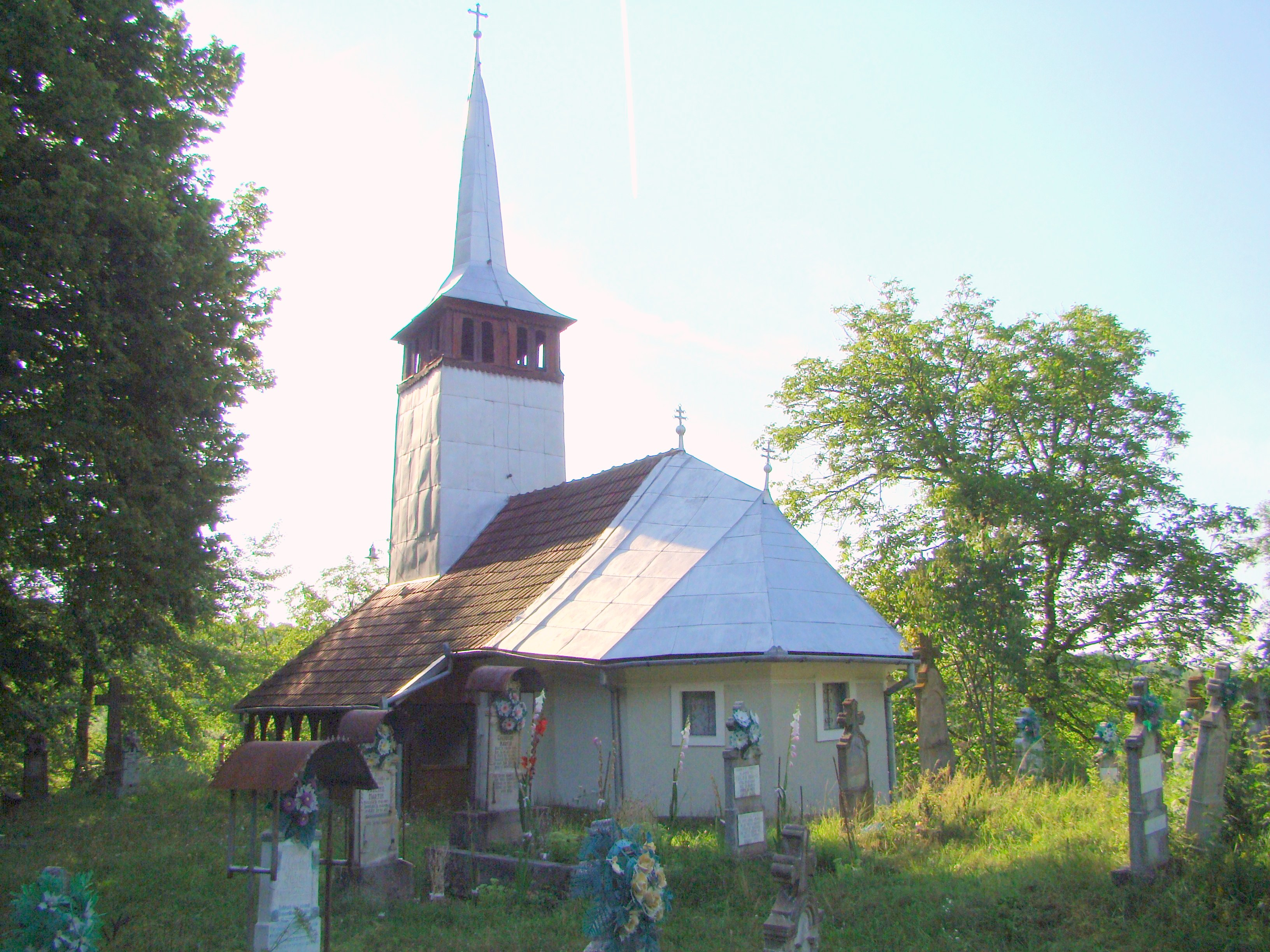
Căraci

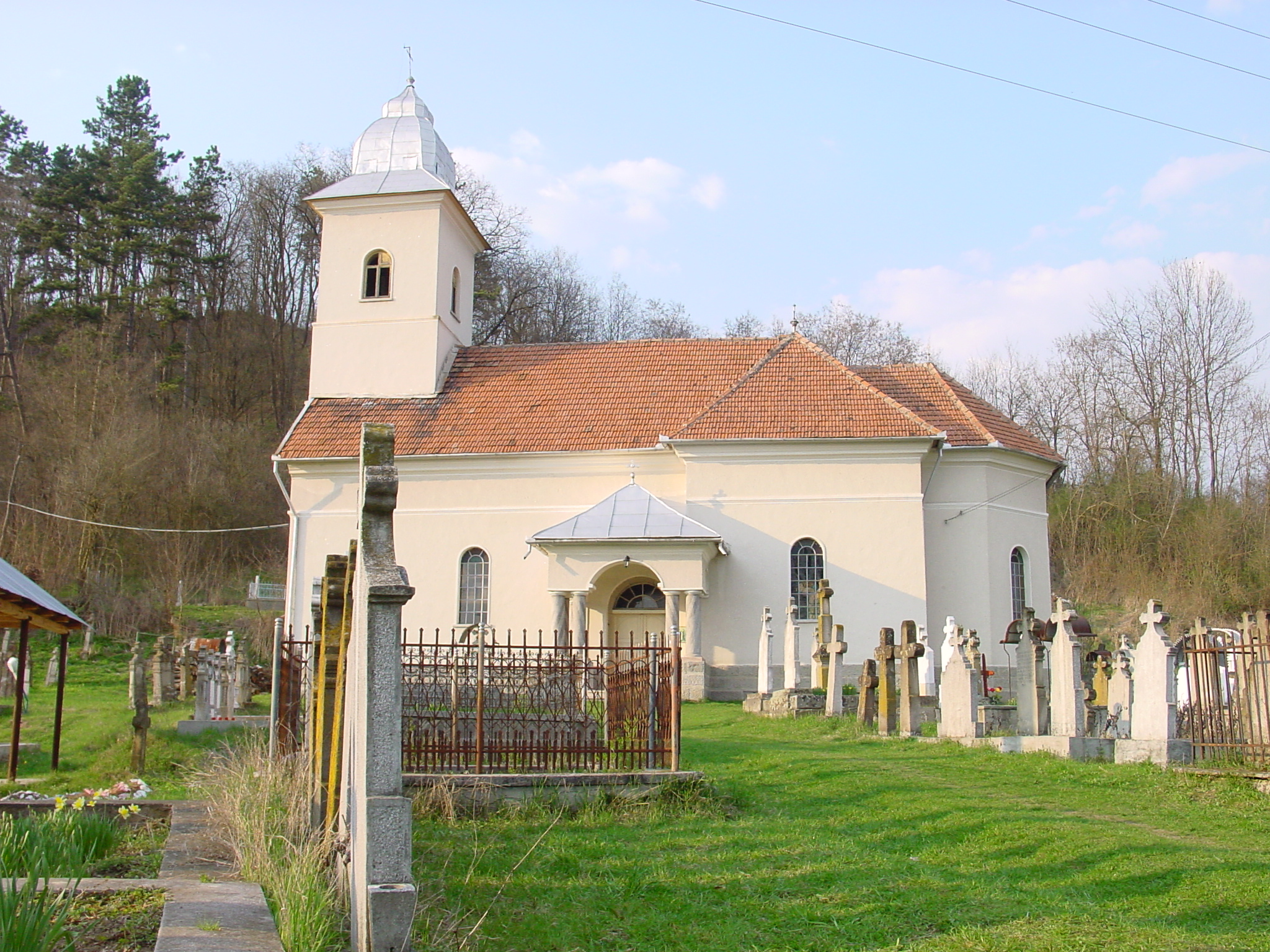
Rișca

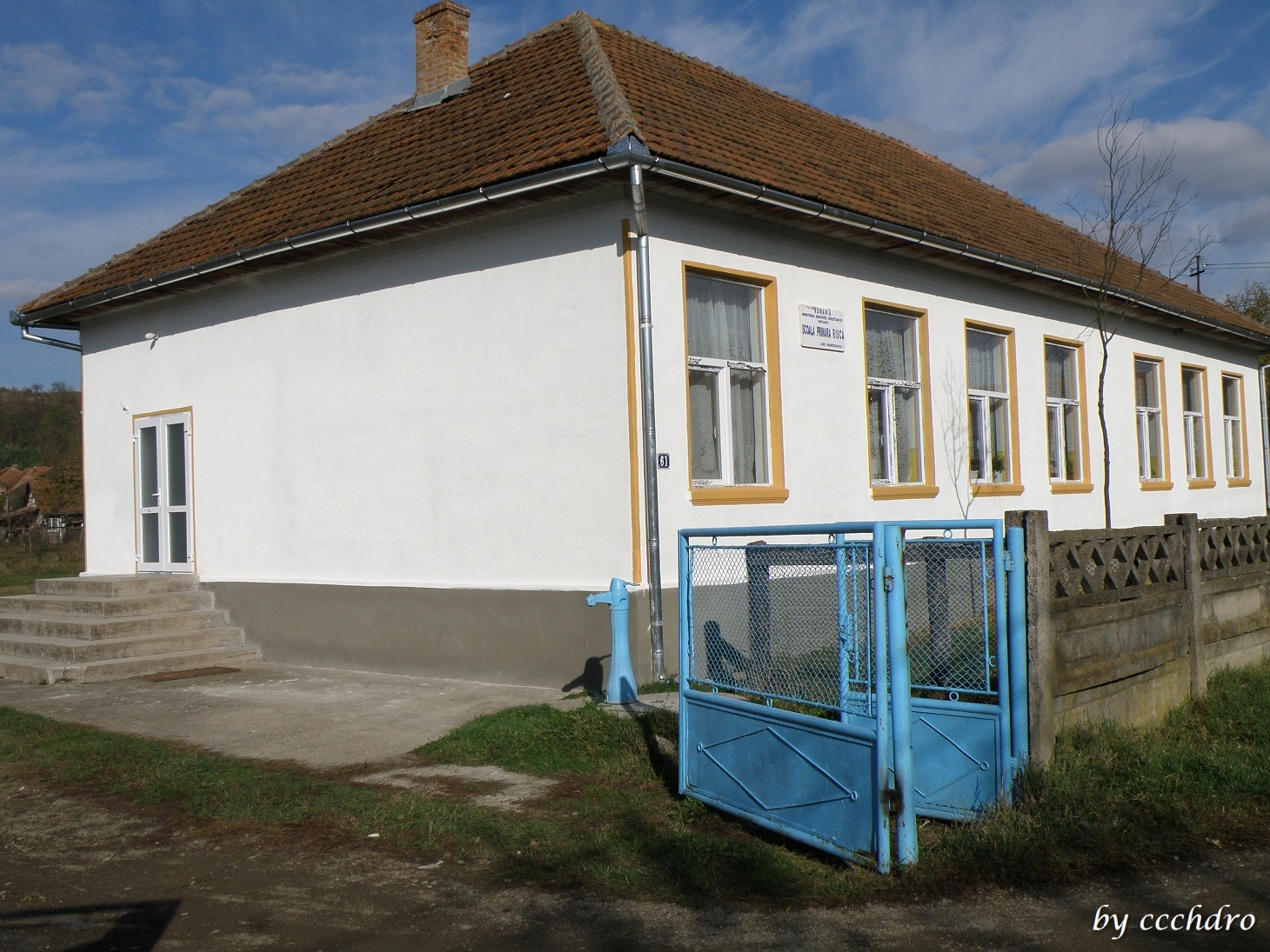
Rișca

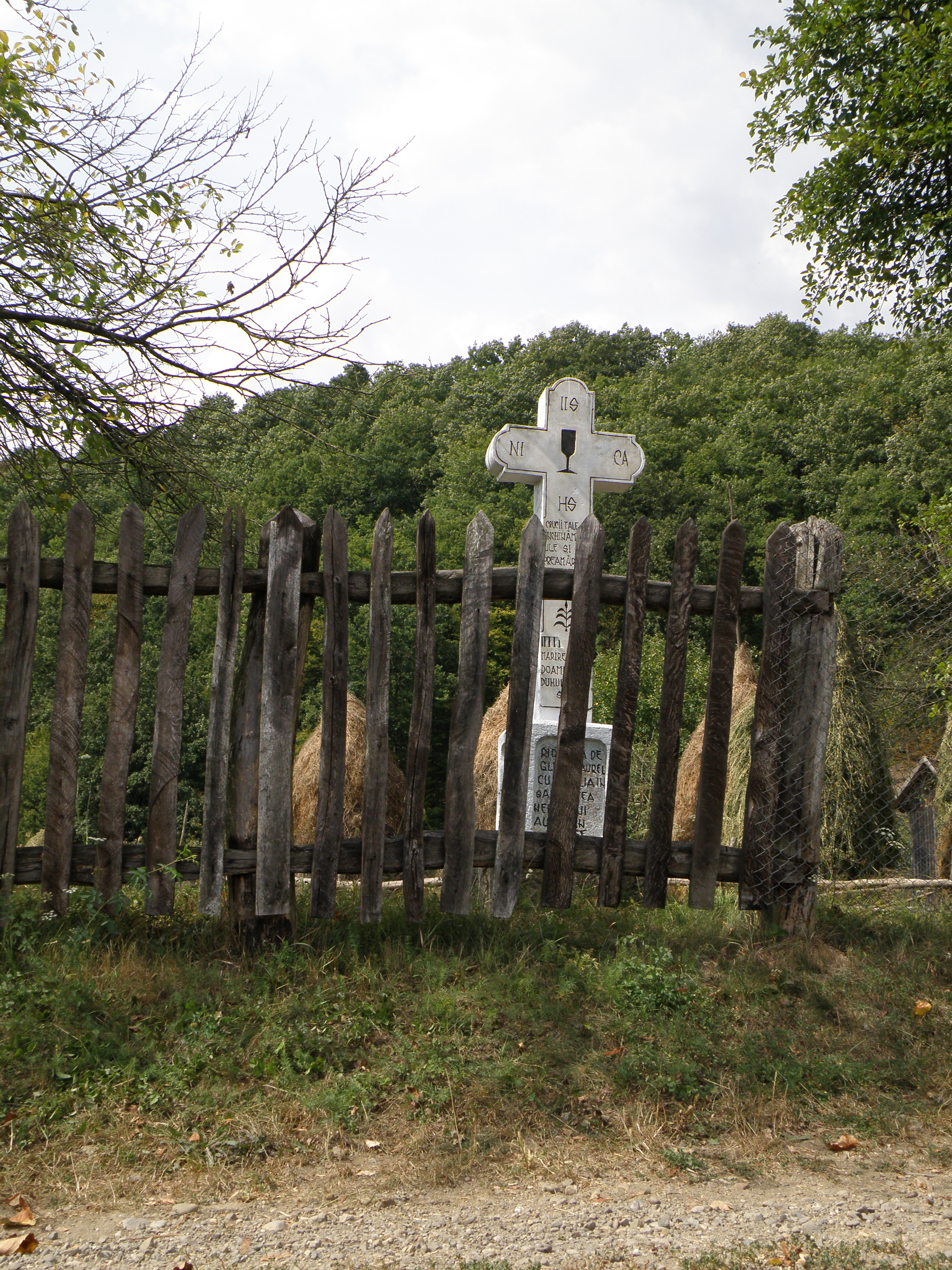
Văleni

== Twin city ==
- Budaörs, Hungary (2022)
