= Gurahonț =

- Commune
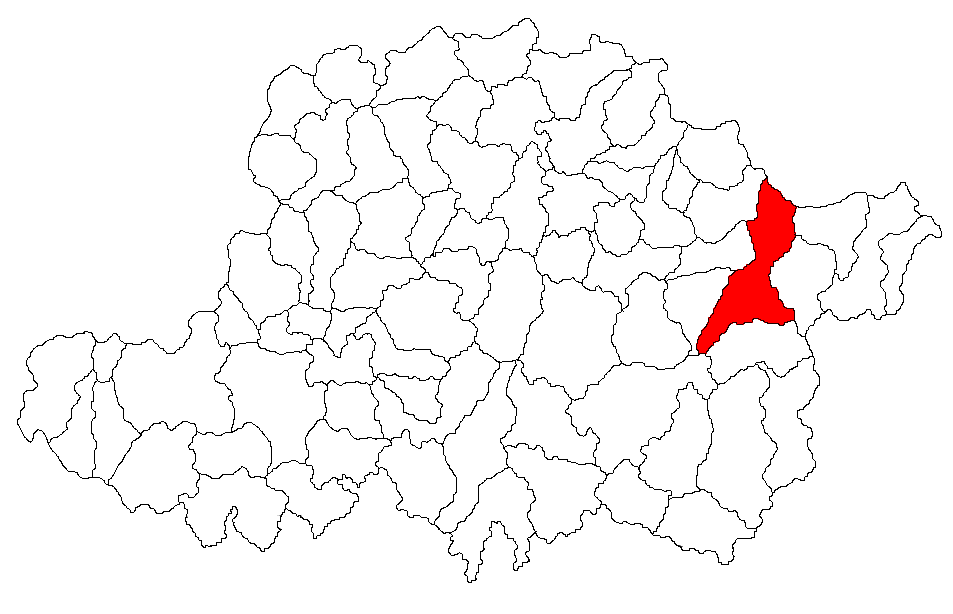
- Location in Arad County

- Location in Romania
- Coordinates: 46°16′N 22°21′E
- Country: Romania
- County: Arad
- Area: 168.52 km^{2} (65.07 sq mi)
- Population (2021-12-01): 3,575
  - Density: 21/km^{2} (55/sq mi)
- Time zone: EET/EEST (UTC+2/+3)
- Vehicle reg.: AR

Gurahonț (Hungarian: Gurahonc) is a commune in Arad County, Romania. It is composed of ten villages: Bonțești (Boncesd), Dulcele (Dulcsele), Feniș (Körösfényes), Gurahonț, Honțișor (Honcisor), Iosaș (Jószás), Mustești (Musztesd), Pescari (Holdmézes), Valea Mare (Valemáre) and Zimbru (Zombrád). There was also a Iosășel (Jószáshely) village here for several centuries until 1968, when it was absorbed by Gurahonț.
