= Nadas =

Nadas may refer to:

== Places ==
=== Romania ===
- Nadăș, Arad, a village in Tauț Commune, Arad County
- Nadăș (Cigher), a tributary of the Cigher in Arad County
- Nadăș, a tributary of the Mureș in Arad County
- Nadăș, a tributary of the Dalnic in Covasna County
- Nadăș, a tributary of the Rica in Covasna County
- Nadăș (Someș), a tributary of the Someșul Mic in Cluj County
- Nadăș, Timiș, a village in the town of Recaș, Timiș County

=== Elsewhere ===
- Nadas River, an ephemeral river ending in the Namib desert
- Nádaš, Trnava, former name of a village in the Trnava District, Slovakia
- Nadas, Kıbrıscık, a village in Bolu Province, Turkey

== Other uses ==
- Nádas (surname)
- The Nadas, an American band

== See also ==
- Nada (disambiguation)
