= Nada =

Nada may refer to:

== Places ==
- Nada, Hainan, China
- Nada, Kentucky, an unincorporated community in the United States
- Nada, Nepal, village in Achham District, Seti Zone
- Nada, Texas, United States
- Nada Station, a station on the JR Kobe Line, located in Hyogo, Japan
- Nada Tunnel, a tunnel near Nada, Kentucky
- Nada-ku, Kobe, one of nine wards of Kobe, Japan

== People ==
- Nada (given name), a feminine given name in South Slavic languages, Arabic, and Italian
- Nađa, a feminine given name in South Slavic languages
- Youssef Nada (1931–2024), Egyptian businessman and financial strategist
- nada (English musician), UK electronica/ambient artist Steve Grainger
- Nada (Italian singer), Italian singer Nada Malanima (born 1953)
- Nada (South Korean musician), Korean rapper and singer Yoon Ye-jin (born 1991)
- NaDa, South Korean professional StarCraft player Lee Yun-Yeol

== Arts, entertainment, and media ==
=== Films ===
- Nada (1947 film), a Spanish film, directed by Edgar Neville, based on Carmen Laforet's novel
- Nada (1974 film), a French film, also known as The Nada Gang, directed by Claude Chabrol in 1974, based on Jean-Patrick Manchette's novel

=== Music ===
- Nada (band), a German punk rock band

==== Albums ====
- Nada (Los Freddy's album), 1979
- Nada (Peter Michael Hamel album), 1977
- Nada!, a 1985 album by Death In June

==== Songs ====
- "Nada" (Belinda Peregrín song), 2013
- "Nada" (Juanes song), 2000
- "Nada" (Paula song), 2016
- "Nada" (Prince Royce song), 2014
- "Nada" (Shakira song), 2018
- "Nada" (Tainy song), 2020
- "Nada", a 1994 song by Ana Bárbara from the album Ana Bárbara
- "Nada", a 2019 song by Cazzu from the album Error 93
- "Nada", a 2020 song by Christine and the Queens from the EP La Vita Nuova
- "Nada", a 2006 song by La 5ª Estación from the album El Mundo Se Equivoca
- "Nada", a 2022 song by Raymix
- "Nada", a 2008 song by Zoé from the album Reptilectric

=== Other arts, entertainment, and media ===
- Nada (novel), a 1944 Spanish-language novel by Carmen Laforet
- Nada (magazine), a Bosnian cultural magazine published between 1895 and 190
- John Nada, the main character from John Carpenter's film They Live, portrayed by Roddy Piper
- Nada (TV series), an Argentine television series

== Other uses ==
- Nāda, a concept in ancient Indian metaphysics
- Nada High School, Hyogo, Japan
- RK Nada, a rugby union club from Split, Croatia

== Acronyms ==
- in the FDA lexicon, New Animal Drug Application
- N-Arachidonoyl dopamine, a CB1 and TRPV1 agonist
- National Aerospace Development Administration, the North Korean space agency
- National Anti-Doping Agency, India
- National Automobile Dealers Association
- National Democratic Alternative (Serbia)
- New Art Dealers Alliance
- Quinolinate synthase, an enzyme

== See also ==
- Nadas (disambiguation)
