= Csernovics Ujfalu =

Csernovics Ujfalu was puszta (in Hungarian) or praedium (depopulated area, in Latin) in the NW part of Arad County, about 10–15 km from the Romanian-Hungarian border, via Curtici. It was initially called Puszta Novosatu/Nowoszatu. On the Topila puszta, east of Macsa/Macea, two Roman Catholic Hungarian villages were formed in the late 1700s, Kis-Ujfalu and south of this, Nagy-Ujfalu. Eventually the two communities merged into Colonie Csernovits-Ujfalu. Situated SE of Curtici, it was later depopulated in March 1852, when the new landlord, who local legend has it that he presumably won the property during a cards game play, dissolved the property, ousting the farmers working there on tobacco fields. The farmers were originally from the Nógrád county, in northern Hungary and they settled in Arad County, on the Zimand puszta, today Zimandu Nou, Arad, next to the previously founded village of Zimandköz. The latter was formed in 1853 by 92 families of Hungarian Roman Catholic farmers ousted by their landlord from Bánkut puszta, in the western part of Arad county (Elek jaras/district, now in Hungary). Today the only remaining part of this settlement is the Csernovics Castle, nearby Macea, Arad.

== See also ==
- List of castles in Romania
- Tourism in Romania
