= Hălmăgel (river) =

- Location within Romania

Location
- Country: Romania
- Counties: Arad County
- Villages: Sârbi, Hălmăgel, Hălmagiu

Physical characteristics
- Mouth: Bănești
  - location: Hălmagiu
  - coordinates: 46.2706°N 22.5910°E

Basin features
- Progression: Bănești→ Crișul Alb→ Körös→ Tisza→ Danube→ Black Sea
- Tributaries
  - right: Luncșoara

The Hălmăgel is a left tributary of the river Bănești in Romania. It discharges into the Bănești in Hălmagiu. Its length is 19 km (12 mi) and its basin size is 70 km^{2} (27 sq mi).
