= Timercea =

- Location within Romania

Location
- Country: Romania
- Counties: Arad County

Physical characteristics
- Mouth: Cigher
  - coordinates: 46.2819°N 21.9355°E
- Length: 19 km (12 mi)
- Basin size: 33 km^{2} (13 sq mi)

Basin features
- Progression: Cigher→ Crișul Alb→ Körös→ Tisza→ Danube→ Black Sea

The Timercea is a left tributary of the river Cigher in Romania. It flows into the Cigher near Tauț. Its length is 19 km (12 mi) and its basin size is 33 km^{2} (13 sq mi).
