= Dudița =

- Location within Romania

Location
- Country: Romania
- Counties: Arad County
- Villages: Dud

Physical characteristics
- Source: Zarand Mountains
- Mouth: Cigher
  - coordinates: 46.3515°N 21.8301°E
- Length: 19 km (12 mi)
- Basin size: 65 km^{2} (25 sq mi)

Basin features
- Progression: Cigher→ Crișul Alb→ Körös→ Tisza→ Danube→ Black Sea
- Tributaries
  - left: Serăstrău

The Dudița is a tributary of the river Cigher in Romania. It flows into the Cigher near Chier. Its length is 19 km (12 mi) and its basin size is 65 km^{2} (25 sq mi).
