= Troas =

Troas may refer to:

== Places ==
- The Troad, historical name for a region in the northwestern part of Anatolia
- Alexandria Troas, a Hellenistic and Roman city in Anatolia
- Troaș, a village in Săvârșin Commune, Arad County, Romania
- Troaș, a river in Arad County, Romania

== People ==
- Troas, queen of Epirus, wife of king Arymbas
- Troas, princess of Epirus, daughter of king Aeacides and queen Phthia
