= Luncșoara (Hălmăgel) =

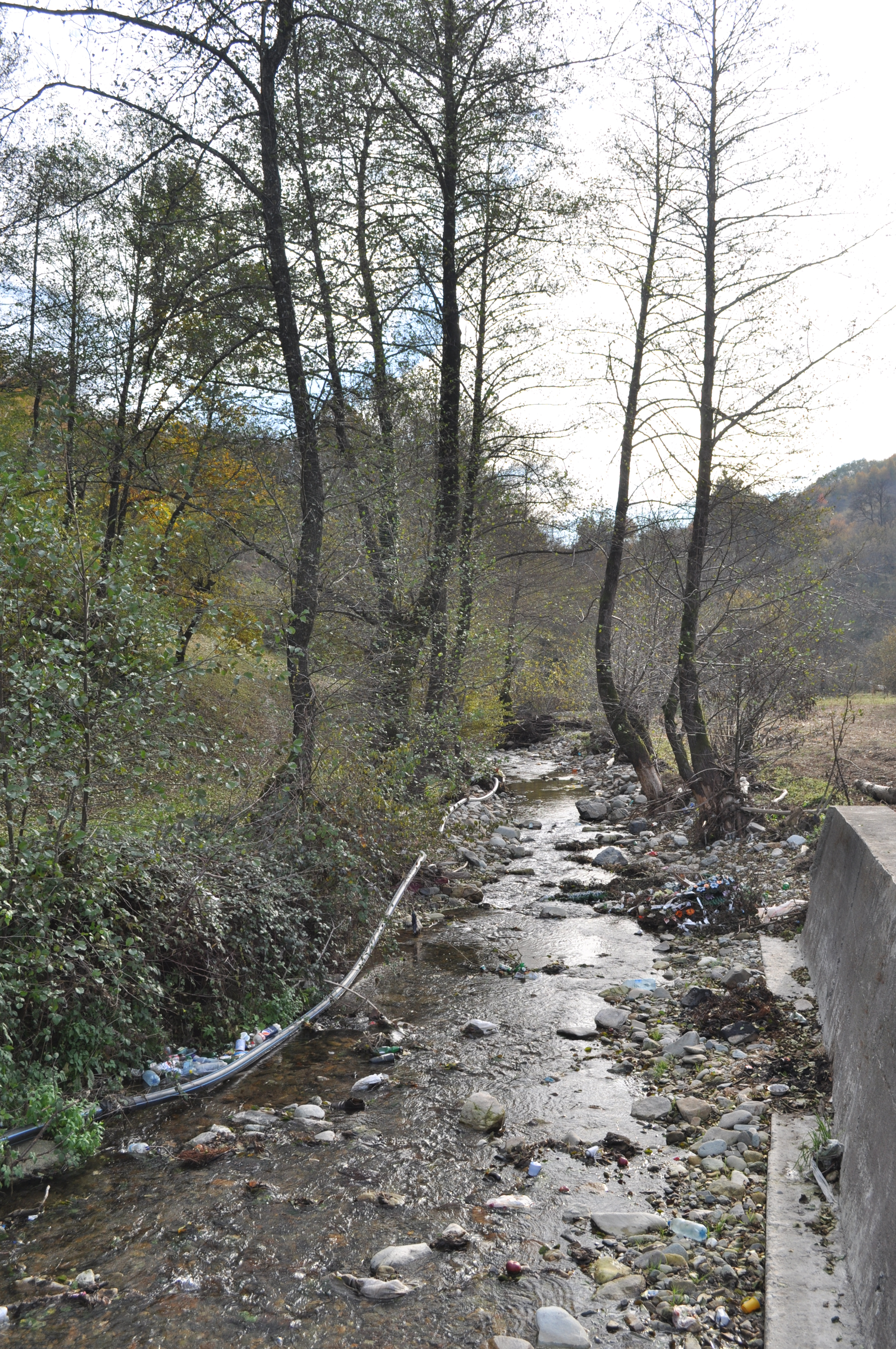

- Location within Romania

Location
- Country: Romania
- Counties: Arad County
- Villages: Luncșoara, Hălmăgel

Physical characteristics
- Mouth: Hălmăgel
  - location: Hălmăgel
  - coordinates: 46.2701°N 22.6188°E

Basin features
- Progression: Hălmăgel→ Bănești→ Crișul Alb→ Körös→ Tisza→ Danube→ Black Sea
- Tributaries
  - left: Pârâul Mic

The Luncșoara is a right tributary of the river Hălmăgel in Romania. It flows into the Hălmăgel in the village Hălmăgel. Its length is 16 km (9.9 mi) and its basin size is 35 km^{2} (14 sq mi).
