= Bănești (Crișul Alb) =

- Location within Romania

Location
- Country: Romania
- Counties: Arad County
- Villages: Brusturi, Cristești, Bănești, Hălmagiu

Physical characteristics
- Mouth: Crișul Alb
  - location: Hălmagiu
  - coordinates: 46.2586°N 22.5576°E
- Length: 19 km (12 mi)
- Basin size: 111 km^{2} (43 sq mi)

Basin features
- Progression: Crișul Alb→ Körös→ Tisza→ Danube→ Black Sea
- Tributaries
  - left: Hălmăgel

The Bănești is a right tributary of the river Crișul Alb in Romania. It discharges into the Crișul Alb in Hălmagiu. Its length is 19 km (12 mi) and its basin size is 111 km^{2} (43 sq mi).
