= Milova =

Milova Milova-patak
- Location within Romania

Location
- Country: Romania
- Counties: Arad County
- Villages: Milova

Physical characteristics
- Mouth: Mureș
  - location: Milova
  - coordinates: 46.0878°N 21.7940°E
- Length: 16 km (9.9 mi)
- Basin size: 38 km^{2} (15 sq mi)

Basin features
- Progression: Mureș→ Tisza→ Danube→ Black Sea
- Tributaries
  - left: Milovița

The Milova (Hungarian: Milova-patak) is a right tributary of the river Mureș in Romania. It discharges into the Mureș in the village Milova. Its length is 16 km (9.9 mi) and its basin size is 38 km^{2} (15 sq mi).
