= Săvârșin Castle =

Country house in Arad County, Romania

Coordinates: 46°00′56.25″N 22°14′08.23″E

Săvârșin Castle Castelul Săvârșin
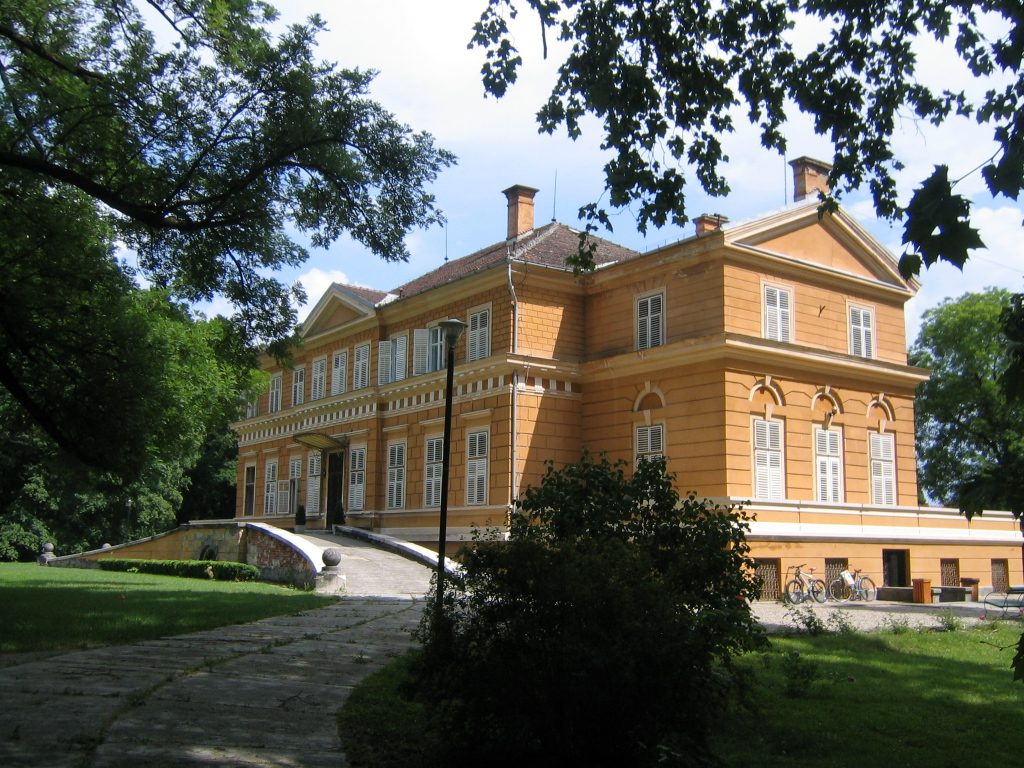
- Front right view of the Castle.
- Interactive map of the Săvârșin Castle; Castelul Săvârșin area

General information
- Architectural style: Neoclassical
- Location: Royal Domain of Săvârșin, Săvârșin, Arad County, Romania
- Current tenants: Official Romanian Countryside Residence of the Romanian Royal Family
- Construction started: See list: First Time: 1650 Renovation: 1840 Restoration: May 2007
- Completed: See list: First Time: 1680 Renovation: 1878 Restoration: October 2015
- Inaugurated: 27 October 2015
- Demolished: 1781
- Client: See list: 1st Time: Count Forray András 2nd Time: United Principalities 3rd Time: King Michael I of the Romanians
- Owner: Romanian Royal Family

Design and construction
- Architects: Restoration: Serban Sturdza; Eugen Pănescu; Augustin Ioan; David Baxter

Săvârșin Castle (Romanian: Castelul Săvârșin, pronunciation: [səvɨrˈʃin]) is a large country house situated in Săvârșin Park, a 6.5-hectare (16-acre) private estate that was owned by King Michael I of the Romanians (1921–2017) in Săvârșin, Arad County, Romania.

It is the Romanian Royal Family’s official country residence where the statutes defining the role and powers of the royal family are signed. King Michael I and Queen Anne spent their annual Christmas holidays here following the castle's restitution to royal ownership, a tradition continued by Margareta, Custodian of the Romanian Crown. Since 2021 the castle grounds and King Michael's collection of WW2 Jeeps have been open to the public during the summer.

== History ==
Formerly known as Forray Castle, Săvârșin was owned by various Hungarian noble families for three centuries during the territory owned by the Kingdom of Hungary until the Union of Transylvania with Romania. In mid-18th century, at the center of the estate on which the current royal castle lies, there was a building raised in western baroque style (dating from 1680), that belonged to the Edelspacher de Gyorok noble family. After having been set on fire in November 1784 by the peasants in the uprise led by Horia, Closca and Crisan, and needed being restored from the foundations, the castle had various owners, till 1858 when it became the possession of Count Leopold Nádasdy de Nádasd et Fogarasföld, the one who re-built it in its present form in 1860.

In 1941, following an exchange of properties, the castle became the property of the Mocioni-Starcea family, who prepared the castle for so-called "crown weekends". In 1943, the castle became the property of King Michael I, who was the king of Romania at that time and bought the castle from the Crown property as a gift for his mother Queen Helen.

=== Nationalization and later usage ===
The castle was nationalized by the communist authorities after King Michael's abdication in 1947. Consequently, it was used as a hospital for internal diseases, a tuberculosis sanatorium and nervous disorders sanatorium until 1967, when Romanian leader Nicolae Ceaușescu decided to turn it into a guest house for visiting heads of state.

=== Return to ownership ===
In 2000 the High Court of Cassation and Justice declared that the entire property and land was to be restored to King Michael I. On certain occasions, the royal estate is open to the public and the building can be seen from a closer distance. Traditionally, the royal family spends the winter holidays at Savârșin, on which occasion many groups come to sing carols for the former sovereign and the royal family. The carol singers come from the nearby villages, but also from other communities in Arad county as well as from the neighbouring counties of Alba, Hunedoara, and Timiș. On Christmas Day, the family members take part in the religious service at the Orthodox church in the village.

== Public opening ==
On 10 May (Monarchy Day) 2021 Margareta, Custodian of the Romanian Crown, formally opened the grounds and Royal Automobile Museum to the public. The park and gardens, King Michael's collection of World War II Jeeps, his recreated car workshop and the royal courtyard are now open to the public during the summer months.

== See also ==
- Romanian Royal Family
- Elisabeta Palace
- Peleş Castle
- Pelișor Castle
- List of castles in Romania
- Tourism in Romania
