= Zimand puszta =

Puszta or praedium, is an uninhabited area in Arad county, Romania, first mentioned in documents in 1743.

In 1828, the Hungarian census recorded here one house with 7 inhabitants. In 1852, and then in 1853, it was settled with farmers coming from Csernovics Ujfalu puszta and Bánkuta puszta, respectively, both places now in SE Hungary). As a result, two new villages were formed: first Zimand Ujfalu (Zimandu Nou) in 1852, and in 1853, Zimandköz (first called Bánkút-Zimand, later renamed Zimand-Bánkút, then Zimandköz and today Zimandköz/Zimandcuz).
