= Nadăș (Cigher) =

- Location within Romania

Location
- Country: Romania
- Counties: Arad County
- Villages: Nadăș

Physical characteristics
- Mouth: Cigher
  - coordinates: 46.2495°N 21.9506°E

Basin features
- Progression: Cigher→ Crișul Alb→ Körös→ Tisza→ Danube→ Black Sea

The Nadăș (Hungarian: Nádas) is a left tributary of the river Cigher in Romania. It flows into the Cigher near the village Nadăș. Its length is 13 km (8.1 mi) and its basin size is 27 km^{2} (10 sq mi).

== Hydronymy ==
The name in Hungarian means "reedy". The Romanian name derives from that.
