= Curtici =

- Town
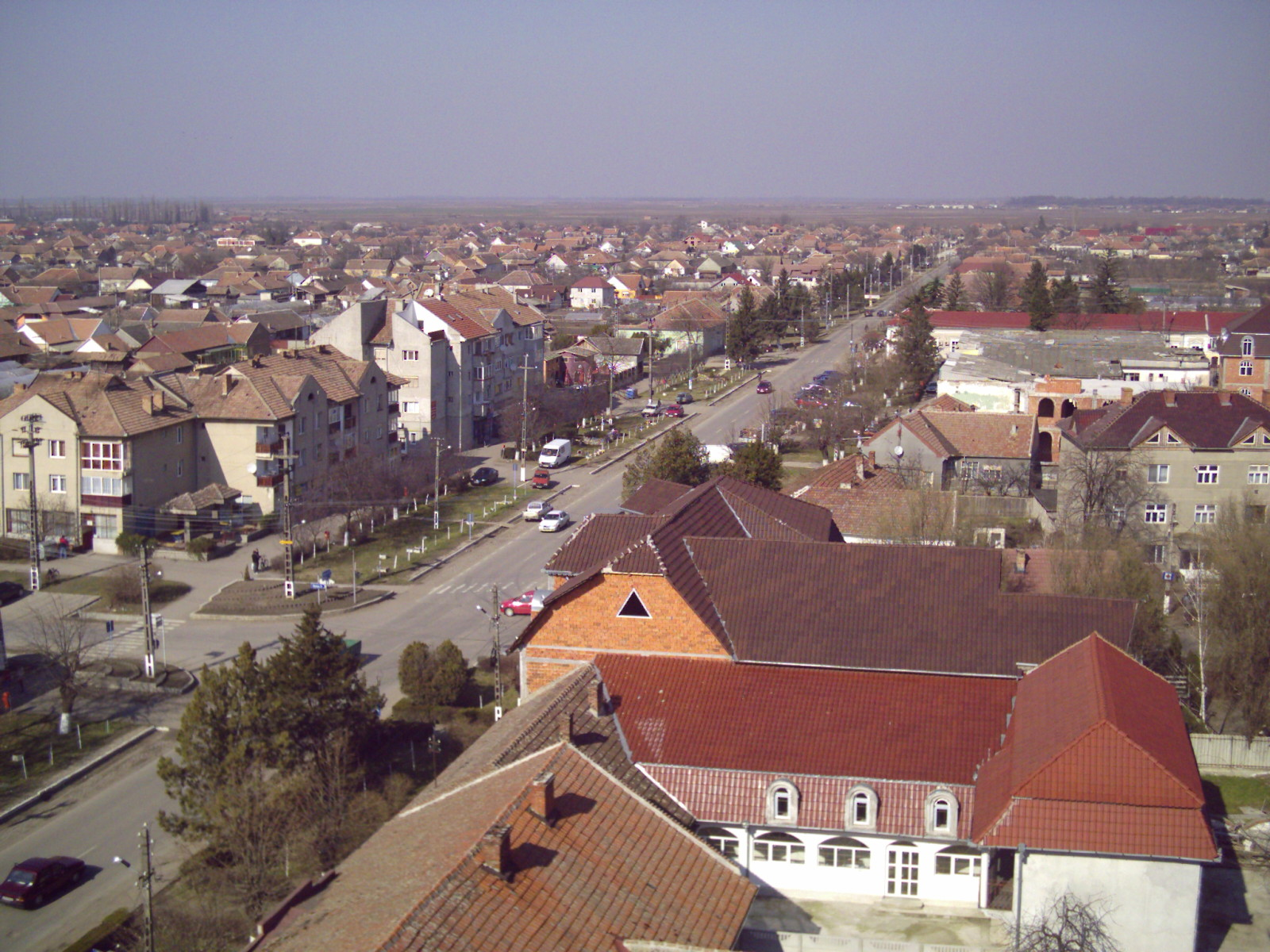

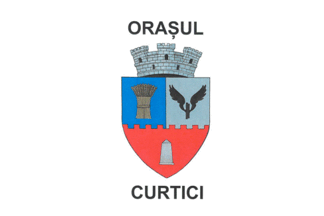
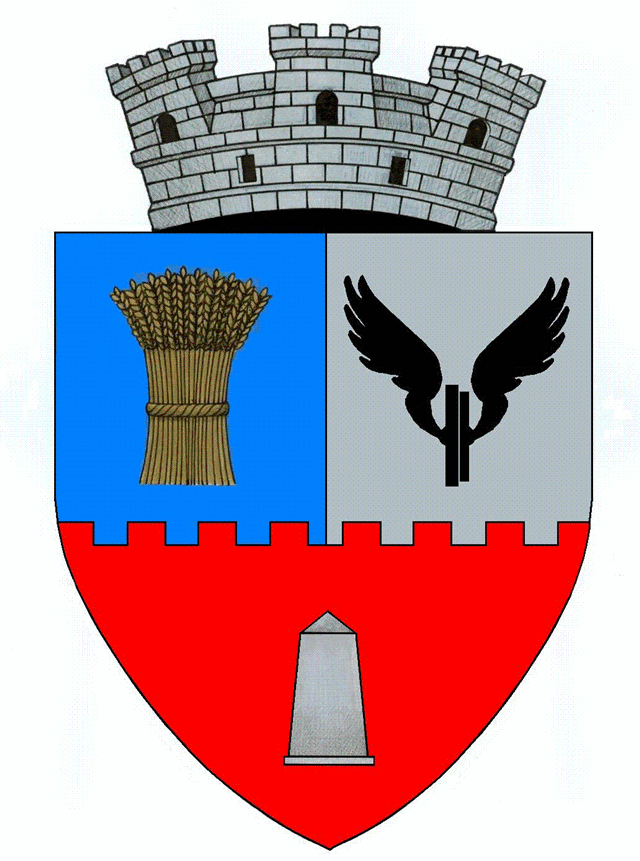
- Flag Coat of arms

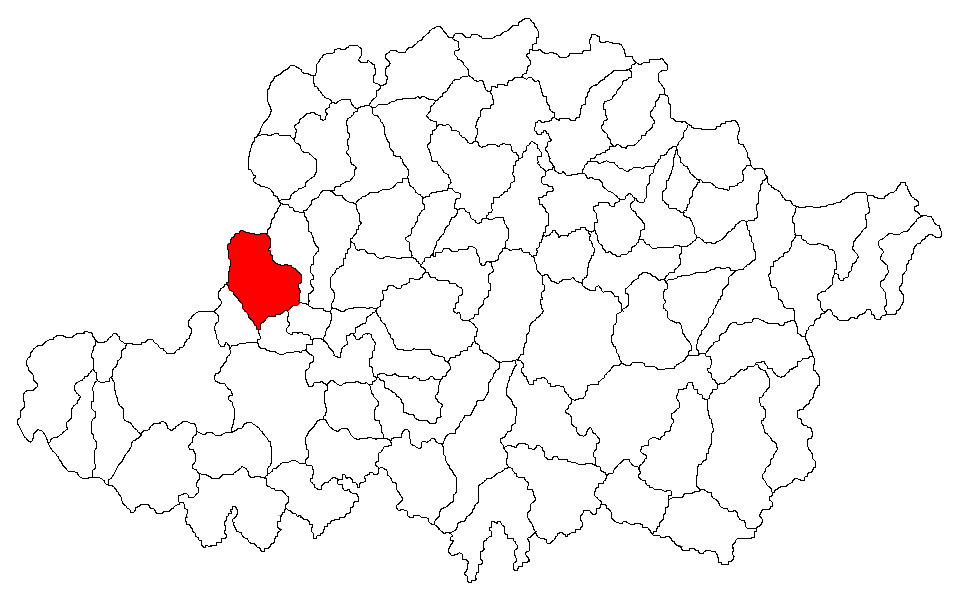
- Location in Arad County

- Location in Romania
- Coordinates: 46°20′31″N 21°18′22″E
- Country: Romania
- County: Arad

Government
  - Mayor (2024–2028): Ioan-Bogdan Ban (PNL)
- Area: 79.70 km^{2} (30.77 sq mi)
- Elevation: 110 m (360 ft)
- Population (2021-12-01): 7,279
  - Density: 91.33/km^{2} (236.5/sq mi)
- Time zone: UTC+02:00 (EET)
  - Summer (DST): UTC+03:00 (EEST)
- Postal code: 315200
- Area code: (+40) 02 57
- Vehicle reg.: AR
- Website: www.primariacurtici.ro

Curtici (Hungarian: Kürtös, German: Kurtitsch) is a town located in Arad County, in western Romania. The town is situated at a 17 km (11 mi) distance from the county capital, Arad, in the western part of Arad County. It is the most important railway meeting point of Central Europe with the western part of Romania. Its administrative territory extends on a 7,970 ha (19,700 acres) area, on the Sântana Plateau, a plateau characterized in the zone of the town by the sand hills formed by the old branches of the river Mureș.

Curtici is a border town between Hungary and Romania, on the Romanian side. It is an especially important rail border crossing, as it is the main crossing between trains going from Hungary and Romania, especially those between Budapest and Bucharest. The town administered the village of Dorobanți until 2004, when it was split off to form a separate commune. The town borders Hungary and Macea commune to the north, Zimandu Nou commune to the east, Șofronea commune to the south, and Dorobanți commune to the west.

The town's Hungarian name means "Trumpeter"; the German and Romanian names derive from that. The first written confirmation of the town Curtici dates back to the 16th century, specifically to 1519. In 1920, it became part of Romania. It was declared a town in 1968.

== Demographics ==
Historical population
Year	Pop.	±%
1977	11,104	—
1992	9,987	−10.1%
2002	9,762	−2.3%
2011	6,849	−29.8%
2021	7,279	+6.3%
Source: Census data

At the 2021 census, Curtici had a population of 7,279. At the 2011 census, the town had 6,849 inhabitants, of which 86.62% were Romanians, 9.35% Roma, 3.19% Hungarians, 0.11% Germans, 0.21% Ukrainians, and 0.1% are of other or undeclared nationalities.

== Economy ==
Its economy is in a continuous development. Due to the agricultural potential of the zone, to its favourable position from the western border of Romania, to its closeness to Arad, to the presence of the main railway making connection with Western Europe (the railway station of Curtici was inaugurated in 1921, simultaneously with the formation of the customs) the town is an important economic pole. The town attracts investments due to the establishment of the Arad-Curtici duty-free zone.

In summer, the thermal water pool is the town's main tourist attraction.
