= Satu Mic =

Satu Mic may refer to several places in Romania:

- Satu Mic, a village in Șilindia Commune, Arad County
- Satu Mic, a village in Lupeni Commune, Harghita County
- Satu Mic, a village in Craidorolț Commune, Satu Mare County
- Victor Vlad Delamarina, Timiș, a commune in Timiș County, formerly called Satu Mic
