= Sânpaul =

Sânpaul may refer to several places in Romania:

- Sânpaul, Cluj, a commune in Cluj County
- Sânpaul, Mureș, a commune in Mureș County
- Sânpaul, a village in Șofronea Commune, Arad County
- Sânpaul, a village in Mărtiniș Commune, Harghita County
