= Pârâul Mic =

Pârâul Mic may refer to the following rivers in Romania:

- Pârâul Mic (Ghimbășel), a tributary of the Ghimbășel in Brașov County
- Pârâul Mic, a tributary of the Luncșoara in Arad County
- Pârâul Mic, a tributary of the Mărcușa in Covasna County
