= Petru Dugulescu =

Romanian Baptist pastor, poet and politician

Petru Dugulescu (Romanian pronunciation: [ˈpetru duɡuˈlesku]; November 18, 1945 – January 3, 2008) was a Romanian Baptist pastor, poet, and politician. A member of the Baptist Union of Romania and a representative of the Christian Democratic National Peasants' Party (PNȚ-CD), he played a part in the 1989 Revolution, being among the organisers of protests in Timișoara.

== Biography ==
Born in Chelmac, Arad County, Dugulescu graduated from the Baptist Theological Seminary in Bucharest, and became a pastor, while authoring works of Christian poetry. During a period when the Communist regime engaged in the persecution of Baptists, he was kept under surveillance by the secret police (the Securitate). The latter institution pressured him to stop preaching, and threatened that he was to suffer a car accident were he to refuse; Dugulescu refused to comply. In September 1985, an unmarked bus crashed into the car he was driving, causing the pastor to suffer multiple fractures. Dugulescu's autobiography, Ei mi-au programat moartea ("They Programmed My Death", translated into English under the title Repenters), details this interval and includes his own account of the events.

Following the Revolution, Petru Dugulescu joined the PNȚ-CD, and was elected to the Chamber of Deputies for Timiș County during the 1992 suffrage, and again in the 1996 legislative election. He served on the Committee for Human Rights, Religious Affairs and National Minority Issues, as well as on the Committee for Foreign Policy. He was the founder and president of Charity Foundation Jesus the Hope of Romania and Onesimus Brothers House for street children in Timișoara.

Dugulescu turned in his last book (Democrație și Persecuție, "Democracy and Persecution") for publication on 20 December 2007. On the afternoon of 3 January 2008 he suffered a heart attack and died in Timișoara.

== See also ==
- Securitate
