= Tăcășele =

- Location within Romania

Location
- Country: Romania
- Counties: Arad County
- Villages: Avram Iancu, Aciuța

Physical characteristics
- Mouth: Crișul Alb
  - location: Aciuța
  - coordinates: 46.2921°N 22.4364°E
- Length: 19 km (12 mi)
- Basin size: 71 km^{2} (27 sq mi)

Basin features
- Progression: Crișul Alb→ Körös→ Tisza→ Danube→ Black Sea
- Tributaries
  - left: Rogoz
  - right: Preotesei, Pârâul Satului

The Tăcășele is a right tributary of the river Crișul Alb in Romania. It discharges into the Crișul Alb in Aciuța. Its length is 19 km (12 mi) and its basin size is 71 km^{2} (27 sq mi).
