= Szerb =

Szerb literally means "Serb" in Hungarian. Szerb may refer to:

- Antal Szerb, Hungarian scholar and writer
- The Hungarian name for Sârbi village, Hălmăgel Commune, Arad County, Romania
