= Valea Mare (Cigher) =

- Location within Romania

Location
- Country: Romania
- Counties: Alba County
- Villages: Arăneag, Târnova

Physical characteristics
- Mouth: Cigher
  - coordinates: 46.3509°N 21.8289°E
- Length: 21 km (13 mi)
- Basin size: 116 km^{2} (45 sq mi)

Basin features
- Progression: Cigher→ Crișul Alb→ Körös→ Tisza→ Danube→ Black Sea
- Tributaries
  - left: Almaș
  - right: Drauț

The Valea Mare is a left tributary of the river Cigher in Romania. It flows into the Cigher near Chier. Its length is 21 km (13 mi) and its basin size is 116 km^{2} (45 sq mi).
