= Zărand =

- Commune
- Location in Arad County

- Location in Romania
- Coordinates: 46.415°N 21.643°E
- Country: Romania
- County: Arad

Government
  - Mayor (2020–2024): Gheorghe Dudaș (PNL)
- Area: 72.55 km^{2} (28.01 sq mi)
- Elevation: 123 m (404 ft)
- Population (2021-12-01): 2,669
  - Density: 37/km^{2} (95/sq mi)
- Time zone: EET/EEST (UTC+2/+3)
- Postal code: 317415
- Area code: +(40) x57
- Vehicle reg.: AR
- Website: primariazarand.ro

Zărand (Hungarian: Zaránd) is a commune in Arad County, Romania. It lies over approximately 72.55 km^{2} (28.01 sq mi) on the Crișurilor Plateau, at the confluence of the Cigher and Crișul Alb rivers. It is composed of two villages, Cintei (Köröscsente) and Zărand, situated 51 km (32 mi) from the county seat, Arad.

== Population ==
According to the 2002 census, the commune had 2,674 inhabitants, out of which 90.9% were Romanians, 8.5% Roma, 0.2% Hungarians, and 0.4% are of other or undeclared nationalities. At the 2011 census, there were 2,674 inhabitants, of which 89.91% were Romanians and 3.06% Roma. At the 2021 census, Zărand had a population of 2,669; of those, 71.56% were Romanians and 18.92% Roma.

== History ==
The first documentary record of Zărand dates back to 1318, while Cintei was first mentioned in 1396.

== Economy ==
The economy of the commune is prevalently agrarian, the locality is known in the region as an important grain-growing and plant-growing area.

== Tourism ==
Although it is not abundant in spectacular touristic elements, the picturesque landscapes of the Crișul Alb and Cigher rivers, as well as the traditions and hospitality of the inhabitants are worth experiencing
