= Peregu Mare =

Peregu Mare Németpereg
- Commune
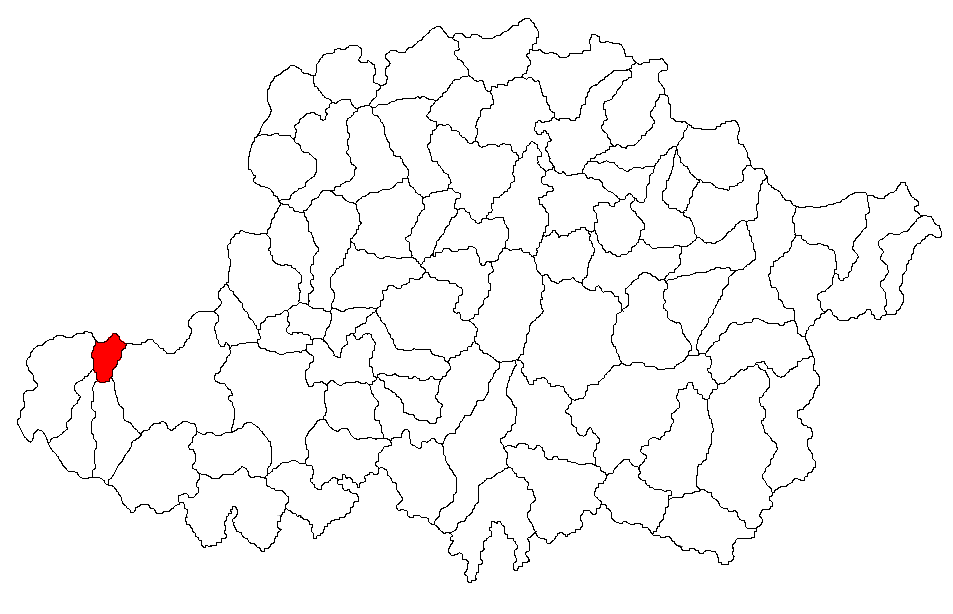
- Location in Arad County

- Location in Romania
- Coordinates: 46°14′N 20°54′E
- Country: Romania
- County: Arad
- Population (2021-12-01): 1,538
- Time zone: EET/EEST (UTC+2/+3)
- Vehicle reg.: AR

Peregu Mare (Hungarian: Németpereg; Slovak: Veľký Pereg) is a commune in Arad County, Romania, on the Arad Plateau, at the western border of Romania. The commune stretches over 3095 ha and is composed of two villages, Peregu Mare (situated at 38 km from Arad) and Peregu Mic (Kispereg).

== Population ==
According to the 2011 census, the population of the commune counts 1,584 inhabitants, out of which 26.26% are Romanians, 46.14% Hungarians, 0.94% Roma, 3.47% Germans, 12.87% Slovaks, 1.19% Ukrainians, 9.09% Czechs. 47% are Reformed, 20.1% Greek-Catholic, 19.7% Romanian Orthodox and 11.4% Roman Catholic. This village has about 876 houses.

== History ==
The first documentary record of Peregu Mare dates back to 1241.

== Economy ==
The economy of the commune is mainly agricultural, farming and livestock-breeding are well represented.

== Tourism ==
Due to the customs and traditions specific to the ethnic groups of this area Peregu Mare commune is a quite attractive place during the period of Christian festivals.
