= Șilindia =

- Commune
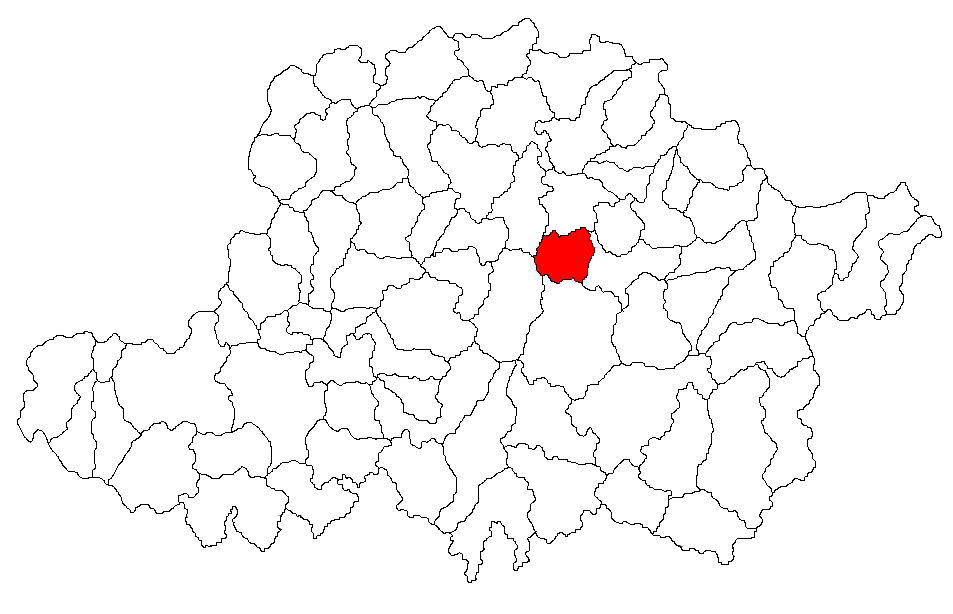
- Location in Arad County

- Location in Romania
- Coordinates: 46°21′N 21°55′E
- Country: Romania
- County: Arad
- Population (2021-12-01): 858
- Time zone: EET/EEST (UTC+2/+3)
- Vehicle reg.: AR

Șilindia (Hungarian: Selénd) is a commune in Arad County, Romania, is lies in the Crișul Alb Basin, at the northern feet of Cigherul Hills, along the river Cigher. Its total surface is 3093 hectares. It is composed of five villages: Camna (Kávna), Iercoșeni (Újárkos), Luguzău (Lugozó), Satu Mic (Dezsőháza) and Șilindia.
