= Dorobanți, Arad =

Coordinates: 46.35°N 21.2333°E

Dorobanți Kisiratos
- Commune
- Location in Romania
- Coordinates
- Country: Romania
- County: Arad
- Population (2021-12-01): 1,509
- Time zone: EET/EEST (UTC+2/+3)
- Vehicle reg.: AR

Dorobanți (Hungarian: Kisiratos) is a commune in Arad County, Romania. Dorobanți commune lies in the Arad Plateau and it stretches over 2780 hectare. It is composed of a single village, Dorobanți, split off from Curtici town in 2004. It is situated at 25 km from Arad.

== Population ==
According to the last census the population of the commune counts 1618 inhabitants. From an ethnical point of view it has the following structure: 8.59% are Romanians, 89.3% Hungarians and 1.27% are of other or undeclared nationalities.

== History ==
The first documentary record of the locality dates back to 1454.

== Economy ==
The commune's present-day economy can be characterized by a powerful dynamic force with significant developments in all the sectors present in the commune. Dorobanți is known as an important agricultural centre of the region.
