= Iratoșu =

Iratoșu Nagyiratos
- Commune
- Location in Romania
- Coordinates: 46°19′N 21°12′E
- Country: Romania
- County: Arad
- Population (2021-12-01): 2,324
- Time zone: EET/EEST (UTC+2/+3)
- Vehicle reg.: AR

Iratoșu (Hungarian: Nagyiratos) is a commune in Arad County, Romania, on the Arad Plateau, at the western border of Romania. The commune stretches over 3,770 hectares and is composed of three villages: Iratoșu (situated at 22 km from Arad), Variașu Mare (Nagyvarjas), and Variașu Mic (Kisvarjaspuszta).

== Population ==
According to the last census, the population of the commune counts 2361 inhabitants, out of which 41,7% are Romanians, 55,1% Hungarians, 2,4% Roms, 0,3% Germans, 0,3% Ukrainians, and 0,2% are of other or undeclared nationalities.

== History ==
The first documentary record of Iratoșu dates back to 1446. Variașu Mic was attested documentarily in 1913, while Variașu Mare was in 1446.

== Economy ==
The commune's present-day economy can be characterized by a powerful dynamic force with significant developments in all the sectors present in the commune.

== Tourism ==
Variașu Mic is also a frontier crossing point. Situated on a plateau, the natural touristic fond of the commune is not abundant in spectacular sights.
