= Cigher =

- Location within Romania

Location
- Country: Romania
- Counties: Arad County
- Villages: Tauț, Chier, Seleuș, Zărand

Physical characteristics
- Mouth: Crișul Alb
  - location: Zărand
  - coordinates: 46.4307°N 21.6220°E
- Length: 56 km (35 mi)
- Basin size: 856 km^{2} (331 sq mi)

Basin features
- Progression: Crișul Alb→ Körös→ Tisza→ Danube→ Black Sea

The Cigher is a left tributary of the river Crișul Alb in Romania. It discharges into the Crișul Alb in Sintea Mică, near Zărand. Its length is 56 km (35 mi) and its basin size is 856 km^{2} (331 sq mi). The Tauț dam is located on the Cigher.

== Tributaries ==
The following rivers are tributaries to the river Cigher:

- Left: Chilodia, Pustaciu, Nadăș, Timercea, Dudița, Valea Mare, Sodom
- Right: Minișel, Miniș
