= Seleuș =

- Commune
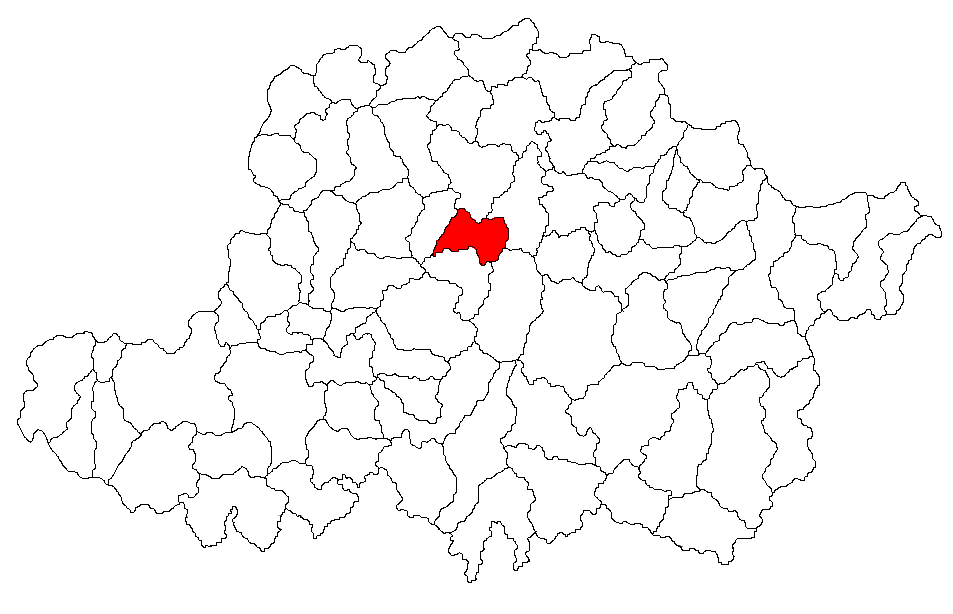
- Location in Arad County

- Location in Romania
- Coordinates: 46°23′N 21°43′E
- Country: Romania
- County: Arad
- Population (2021-12-01): 2,997
- Time zone: EET/EEST (UTC+2/+3)
- Vehicle reg.: AR

Seleuș (Hungarian: Csigérszőllős) is a commune in Arad County, Romania. Seleuș commune lies in the eastern part of the Crișul Alb Plateau, along the river Cigher. Its administrative territory occupies 4122 hectares. It is composed of three villages: Iermata (Csigérgyarmat), Moroda (Marót) and Seleuș (situated at 44 km from Arad).

== Population ==
According to the last census, the population of the commune is 3189 inhabitants, out of which 98.8% are Romanians, 0.4% Hungarians, 0.7% Roma and 0.1% are of other or undeclared nationalities.

== History ==
The first documentary record of Seleuș dates back to 1489. Iermata was attested documentarily in 1387, while Moroda in 1508.

== Economy ==
Vegetable growing, growing of grain and technical crops, as well as livestock-breeding are the main agricultural sectors.

== Tourism ==
Beside its fishponds, the Turkish bridge built over the Cigher dating from the 15-17th centuries is the most attractive interest of the commune.
