= Troaș =

Troaș Torjás-patak
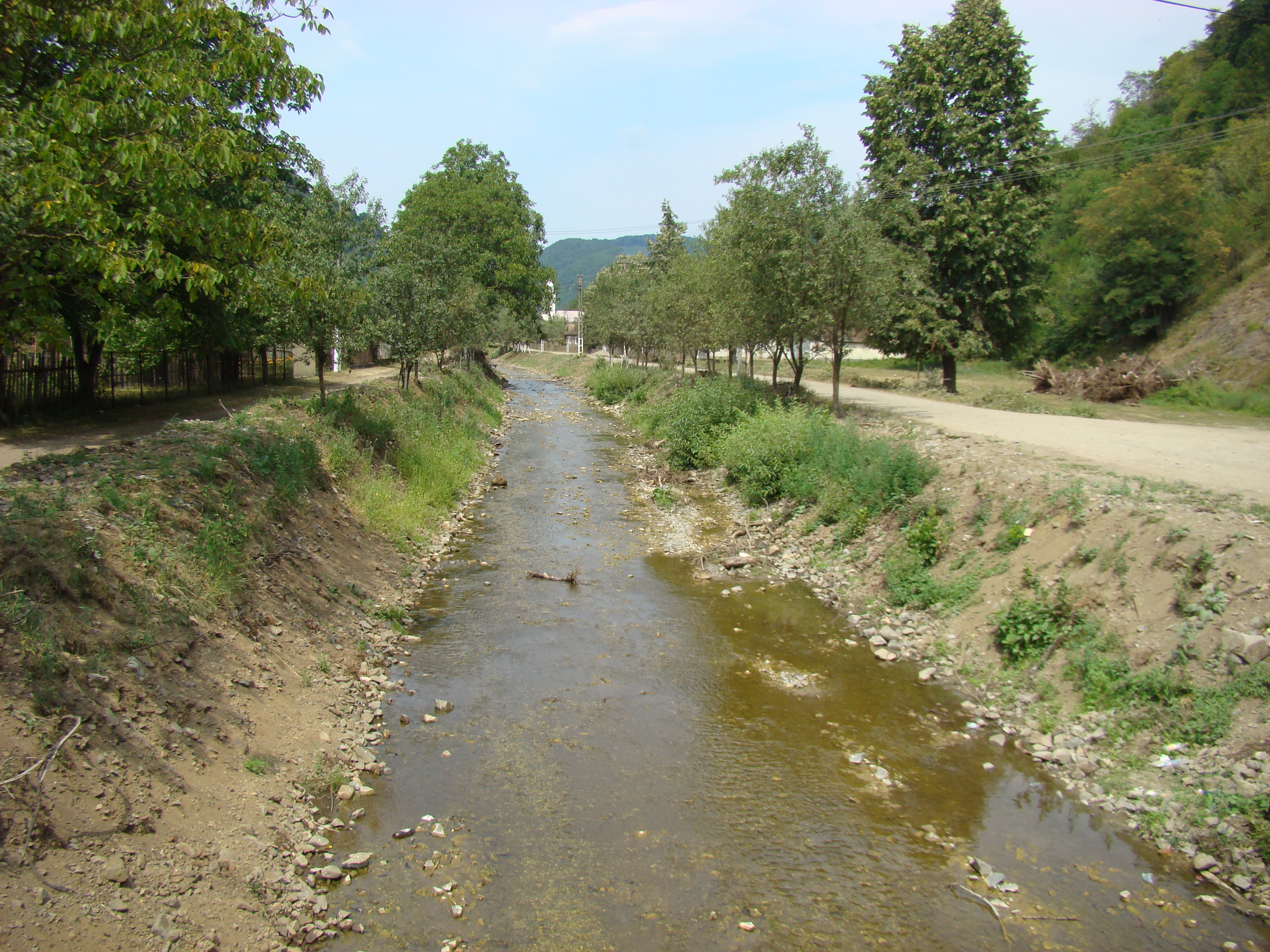

- Location within Romania

Location
- Country: Romania
- Counties: Arad County
- Villages: Temeșești, Săvârșin

Physical characteristics
- Mouth: Mureș
  - location: Săvârșin
  - coordinates: 46.0035°N 22.2352°E
- Length: 22 km (14 mi)
- Basin size: 77 km^{2} (30 sq mi)

Basin features
- Progression: Mureș→ Tisza→ Danube→ Black Sea

The Troaș (Hungarian: Torjás-patak) is a right tributary of the river Mureș in Romania. It discharges into the Mureș in Săvârșin. Its length is 22 km (14 mi) and its basin size is 77 km^{2} (30 sq mi).
