= Șepreuș =

- Commune
- Location in Romania
- Coordinates: 46°34′N 21°44′E
- Country: Romania
- County: Arad
- Population (2021-12-01): 2,752
- Time zone: UTC+02:00 (EET)
  - Summer (DST): UTC+03:00 (EEST)
- Vehicle reg.: AR

Șepreuș (Hungarian: Seprős) is a commune in Arad County, Romania, is situated on the northern part of the Teuz Plateau, it stretches over 5768 ha. It is composed of a single village, Șepreuș, situated at 63 km from Arad.

== Population ==
According to the last census, the population of the commune counts 2472 inhabitants, out of which 89.6% are Romanians, 0.8% Hungarians, 9.3% Roma and 0.3% are of other or undeclared nationalities.

== History ==
The first documentary record of the locality Șepreuș dates back to 1407.

== Economy ==
The economy of the commune is based on agriculture, mainly on growing of grain, maize, sunflower, barley, sugar-beet, vegetable, oil plants, fodder-crop and technical crops.

== Tourism ==
Șepreuș is known for its fishponds and its castle built in the 19th century.
