= Ovidiu Vezan =

Romanian footballer

Personal information
- Date of birth: 20 March 1985 (age 41)
- Place of birth: Șofronea, Romania
- Height: 1.72 m (5 ft 8 in)
- Position: Attacking midfielder

Team information
- Current team: Viitorul Arad
- Number: 23

Senior career*
Years	Team	Apps	(Gls)
2001–2002	UTA Arad	2	(0)
2002–2003	West Petrom Arad		
2003–2004	ACU Arad	8	(0)
2004–2005	Unirea Sânnicolau Mare	28	(4)
2005–2006	Jiul Petroșani	9	(0)
2006–2008	Minerul Lupeni	50	(3)
2008–2010	Internațional Curtea de Argeș	46	(9)
2010–2015	Săgeata Năvodari	97	(7)
2015	Academica Argeş	11	(5)
2015	Delta Dobrogea Tulcea	12	(2)
2016	Farul Constanța	9	(2)
2016–2017	Metalurgistul Cugir	6	(1)
2017–2018	Șirineasa	20	(5)
2018–2020	Gloria LT Cermei	28	(2)
2022–	Viitorul Arad	12	(0)

International career
	Romania U17	2	(0)
	Romania U19	3	(0)
- * Club domestic league appearances and goals as of 1 October 2017

Ovidiu Vezan (born 20 March 1985) is a Romanian professional footballer who plays as an attacking midfielder for Liga III side Viitorul Arad.
