= Nada, Nepal =

Nada, Nepal नदा
- Village development committee
- Location within Nepal
- Coordinates: 28.94°N 81.33°E

Population (2001)
  - Total: 2,703
  - Religions: Hindu
- Time zone: UTC+5:45 (Nepal Time)

Nada is a village in Achham District in the Seti Zone of western Nepal. At the time of the 1991 Nepal census, the village had a population of 2319 living in 430 houses. At the time of the 2001 Nepal census, the population was 2703, of which 40% was literate.
