= Nada (band) =

German punk rock band

Nada is a German punk rock band founded in 2003.

The band has released three albums:

- Zu kalt 2005
- Vamos 2006
- Nach vorn! 2012
