= Conop =

- Commune
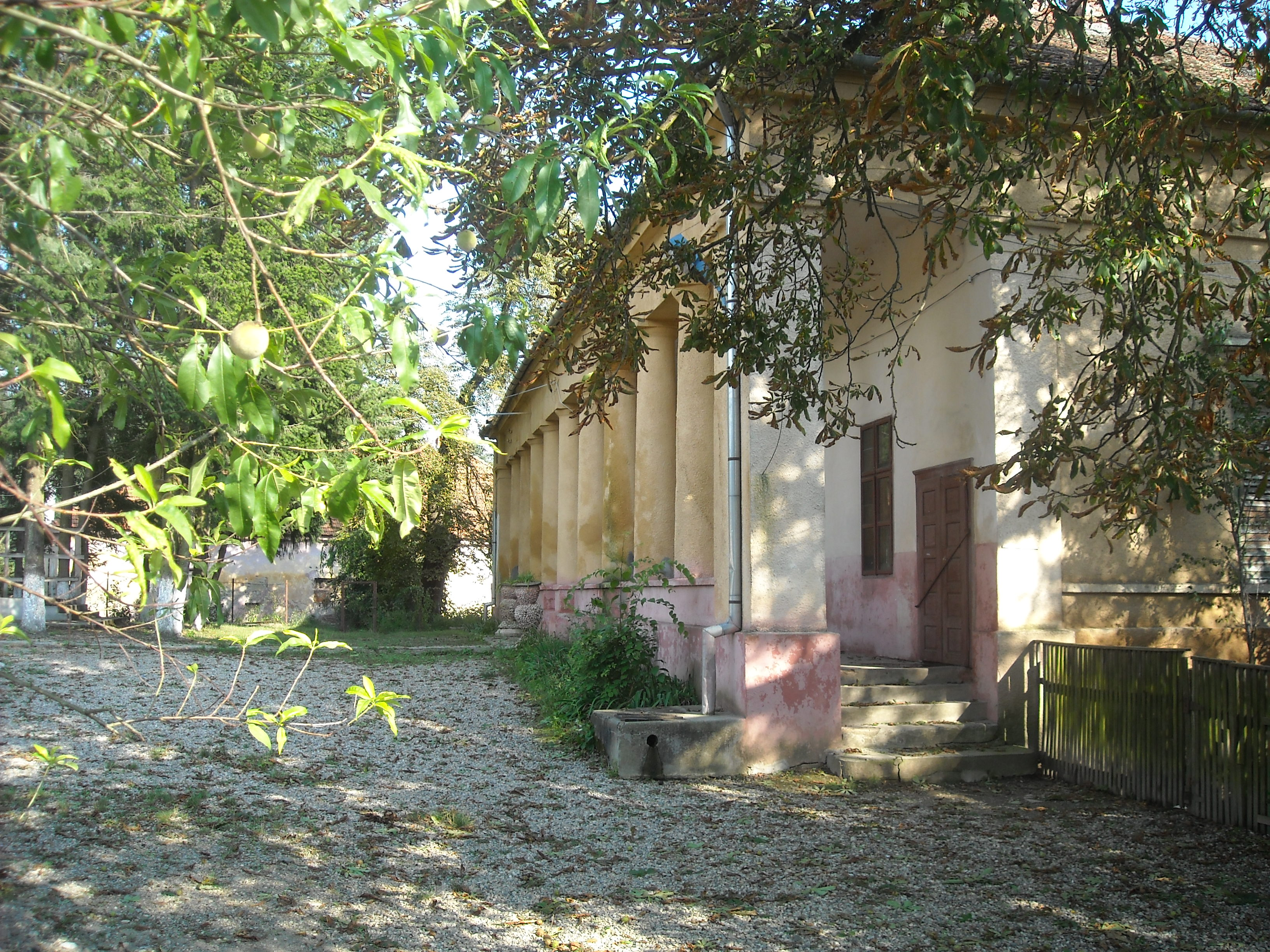
- Former manor house of Ștefan Cicio Pop in Conop

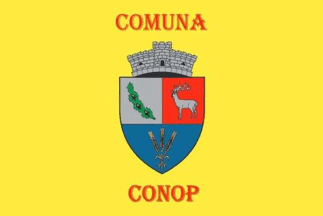
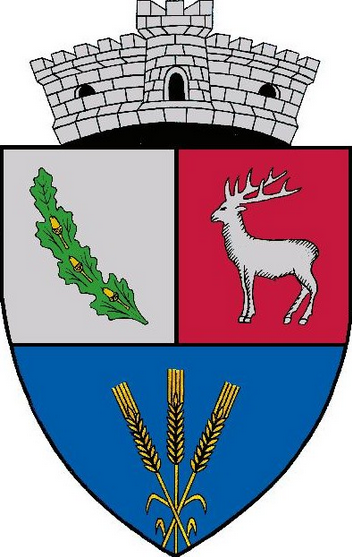
- Flag Coat of arms

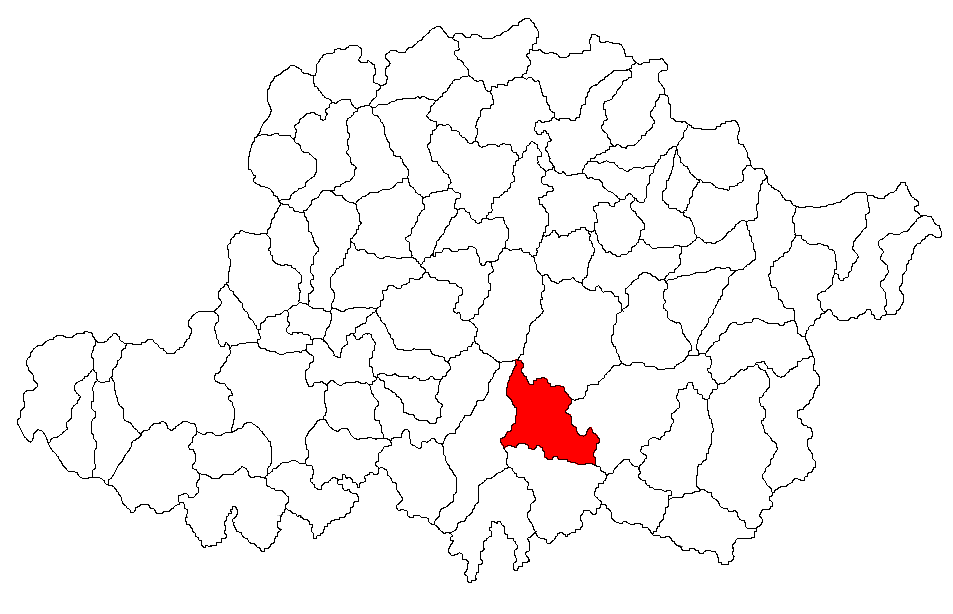
- Location in Arad County

- Location in Romania
- Coordinates: 46°6′N 21°53′E
- Country: Romania
- County: Arad

Government
  - Mayor (2020–2024): Petrica Moldovan (PNL)
- Area: 54.66 km^{2} (21.10 sq mi)
- Elevation: 137 m (449 ft)
- Population (2021-12-01): 2,096
  - Density: 38.35/km^{2} (99.32/sq mi)
- Time zone: UTC+02:00 (EET)
  - Summer (DST): UTC+03:00 (EEST)
- Postal code: 317080
- Area code: (+40) 02 57
- Vehicle reg.: AR
- Website: www.primariaconop.ro

Conop (Hungarian: Konop) is a commune located in Arad County, Romania. Conop is situated at the southern foot of Zărand Mountains, in the Mureș River Couloir. The commune stretches over 5,466 ha (13,510 acres) and it is composed of five villages: Belotinț (Belotinc), Chelmac (Maroseperjes), Conop (situated 50 km from Arad), Milova (Milova), and Odvoș (Odvos).

== Population ==
At the 2021 census, Conop had 2,096 inhabitants, of which 95.23% were Romanians, while at the 2011 census, it had a population of 2,258, with 94.46% Romanians. At the 2002 census, the commune had 2,342 inhabitants; of those, 98.4% were Romanians, 0.5% Hungarians, 0.2% Germans, 0.4% Ukrainians, and 0.5% of other or undeclared nationalities.

== History ==
The first documentary record of the locality Conop dates back to 1506. The other settlements were attested as follows: Belotinț in 1607, Chelmac in 1717, Milova and Odvoș in 1440.

== Natives ==
- Petru Dugulescu (1945 – 2008), Baptist pastor, poet, and politician
- Siluan Mănuilă (born 1971), bishop of the Romanian Orthodox Church

== Economy ==
The commune's present-day economy can be characterized by a powerful dynamic force with significant developments in all the sectors present in the commune. Conop is known as an important fructiferous basin of the region.

== Tourism ==
Conop commune can become an area with touristic attraction by trimming up its anthropic and natural potential. Among the most important touristic sights of the commune put under protection we can mention the walls of the Eperyes monastery in Chelmac, the Ștefan Cicio Pop mansion in Conop built at the end of the 18th century (today being a general school), the ruins of the mining exploitation "Zidurile de la Tău" in Milova (1800), and the Konopi castle in Odvoș, built in the 18th century in neoclassic style. Another touristic sight of the commune is the school camp in Odvoș.
