= Pleșcuța =

- Commune
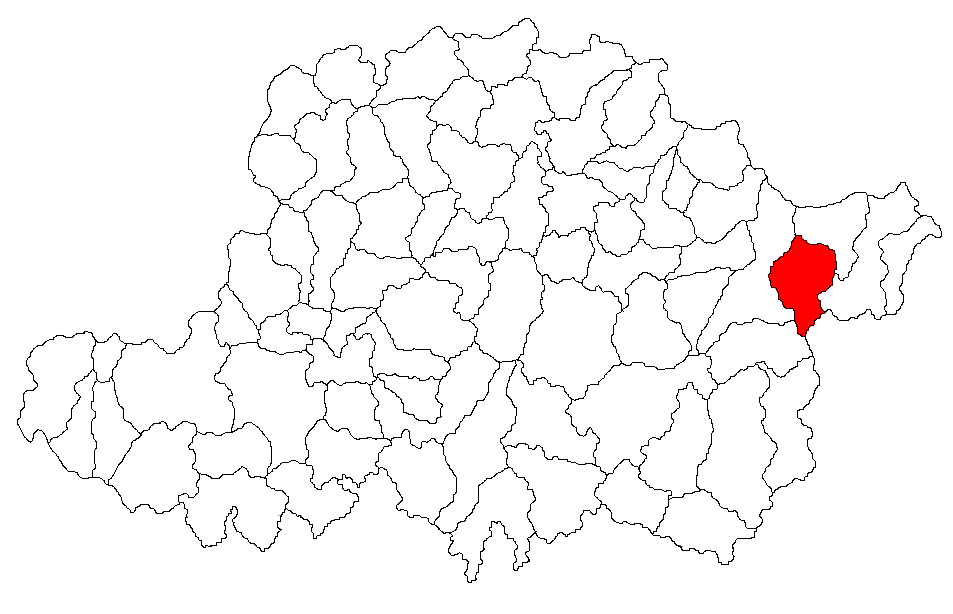
- Location in Arad County

- Location in Romania
- Coordinates: 46°18′02″N 22°25′25″E
- Country: Romania
- County: Arad
- Population (2021-12-01): 1,008
- Time zone: EET/EEST (UTC+2/+3)
- Vehicle reg.: AR

Pleșcuța (Hungarian: Peleskefalva), a commune in Arad County, Romania, is situated in the Hălmagiu Basin, at the foot of Codru-Moma Mountains and Metaliferi Mountains, along the upper course of the Crișul Alb River. It is connected with the Gurahonț Basin by the epigenetic defile of the Crișul Alb existing between Pleșcuța and Gurahonț. The commune stretches over 7000 hectares and is composed of seven villages: Aciuța (Acsuca), Budești (Bugyfalva), Dumbrava (Körösdombró), Gura Văii (Vojkaháza), Pleșcuța (situated at 116 km from Arad), Rostoci (Rosztócs) and Tălagiu (Talács).

== Population ==
According to the last census the population of the commune counts 1498 inhabitants, out of which 96.0% are Romanians, 3.9% Roma and 0.1% are of other or undeclared nationalities.

The first documentary records of Pleșcuța, Rostoci and Tălagiu date back to 1439. Aciuța was attested documentarily in 1366, Budești in 1441-1445, Dumbrava in 1553 and Gura Văii in 1553-1561.

== Economy ==
The commune's present-day economy can be characterized by a powerful dynamic force with significant developments in all the sectors. The secondary economic sector is represented by the exploitation of andesite, lumbering and conversion of timber.

== Tourism ==
The traditional architecture, the ethno-folkloric fond of the zone, the picturesque landscapes from the Văratecul peak and Măgura Ciunganilor, the defile of the Crișul Alb River, the castle built in the 18th century in neoclassic style in Aciuța and the wooden church called "Înălțarea Domnului" in Budești - a historical and architectural monument built in 1772 and painted in 1860 are some of the commune's tourist sites.
