= Nádas (surname) =

Nádas is a surname, and may refer to:

- Bence Nádas (born 1996), Hungarian sprint canoeist
- Karl Tersztyánszky von Nádas (1854–1921), Austro-Hungarian army officer
- Ödön Nádas (1891–1951), Hungarian footballer and coach
- Péter Nádas (born 1942), Hungarian writer
- Tamás Nádas (1969–2014), Hungarian aerobatics pilot
- Tibor Nádas (1925–1968), Hungarian rower
