= Hălmagiu =

- Commune
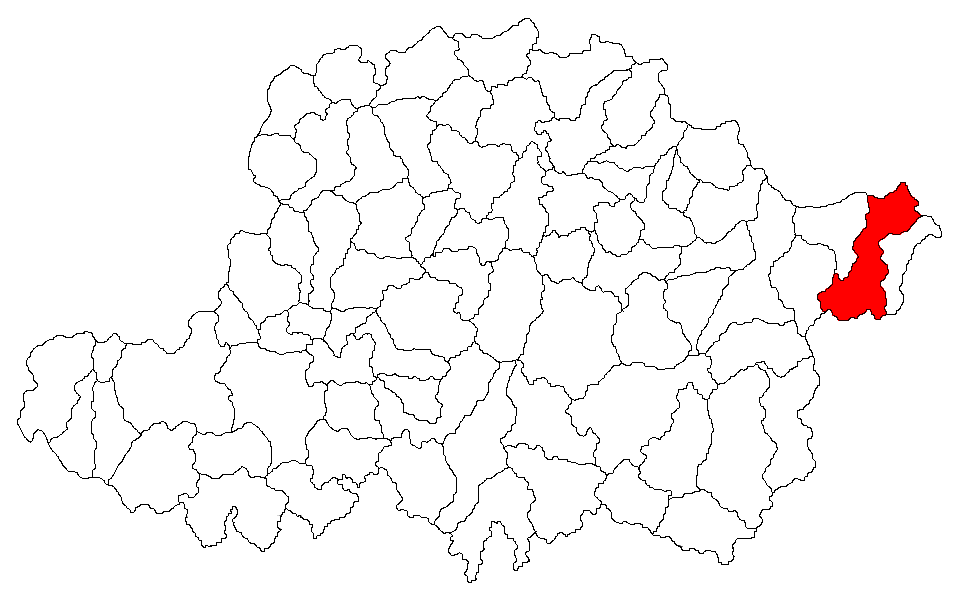
- Location in Arad County

- Location in Romania
- Coordinates: 46°16′N 22°35′E
- Country: Romania
- County: Arad
- Population (2021-12-01): 2,297
- Time zone: EET/EEST (UTC+2/+3)
- Vehicle reg.: AR

Hălmagiu (Hungarian: Nagyhalmágy [ˈnɒchɒlmaːɟ]) is a commune in Arad County, Romania.

Hălmagiu commune is situated in the basin with the same name, at the confluence of the Hălmăgel and Crișul Alb Rivers, at the foot of Bihor Mountains. It stretches over 8400 hectares. It is composed of eleven villages: Bănești (Zarándbánya), Bodești (Bogyafalva), Brusturi (Páfrányos), Cristești (Keresztespatak), Hălmagiu (situated at 136 km from Arad), Ionești (Körösivánd), Leasa (Sövényes), Leștioara (Kisles), Poienari (Halmágymező), Tisa (Tiszafalva) and Țărmure (Martfalva).

== Name ==
The name of Hălmagiu is of Hungarian origin, derived from alma, apple and ágy meaning river bed.

== Population ==
According to the last census, the population of the commune counts 3562 inhabitants, out of which 99.9% are Romanians and 0.1% are of other or undeclared nationalities.

== History ==
The first documentary record of the locality Hălmagiu dates back to 1390, Bănești, Bodești and Ionești in 1441, Brusturi in 1360, Cristești in 1464, Leasa, Tisa and Țărmure in 1439, Leștioara in 1477 and Poienari in 1760–1762.

== Economy ==
Although the economy of the commune is prevalent agricultural, the secondary and tertiary economic sectors have also developed recently. The commune is known as an important fructiferous basin of the region. Due to the small industry represented by handicraft, Hălmagiu has become an important centre of furriery and producing of wooden tools. The main exploitable resources are andesite, complex iron ore and banded clay.

== Tourism ==
The main attractions of the commune are:

- the ruins of a castle originating from the 16th century, the former post-house dating back to the end of the 18th century;
- the monument dedicated to Avram Iancu;
- the monument raised in honour of the nation's heroes;
- the princely Orthodox church called "Adormirea Maicii Domnului", It was built in 1440 and attributed to Moga voivode, it has wall-paintings from the 15th century;
- Other sights are the church built in the 18th century in simplificated Baroque style called "Nașterea Maicii Domnului" with its Byzantine styled wall-paintings;
- the wooden church in Cristești called "Sfinții Arhangheli Mihail și Gavril" built before 1700 and painted in 1865;
- the wooden church called "Pogorârea Duhului Sfânt" in Bodești (1750-1760) painted in 1831 and restored in 1957;
- the wooden church in Ionești called "Sfântul Gheorghe" built in 1730 at the place of another one dating back to 1460, with pictures made on canvas in 1845;
- the wooden church in Tisa called "Sfinții Apostoli Petru și Pavel" built in 1770 and painted in 1846;
- the church in Țărmure, also made of wood and called "Sfinții Arhangheli Mihail și Gavril", built in 1780 and painted in 1870.
