= Șofronea =

Șofronea Sofronya
- Commune
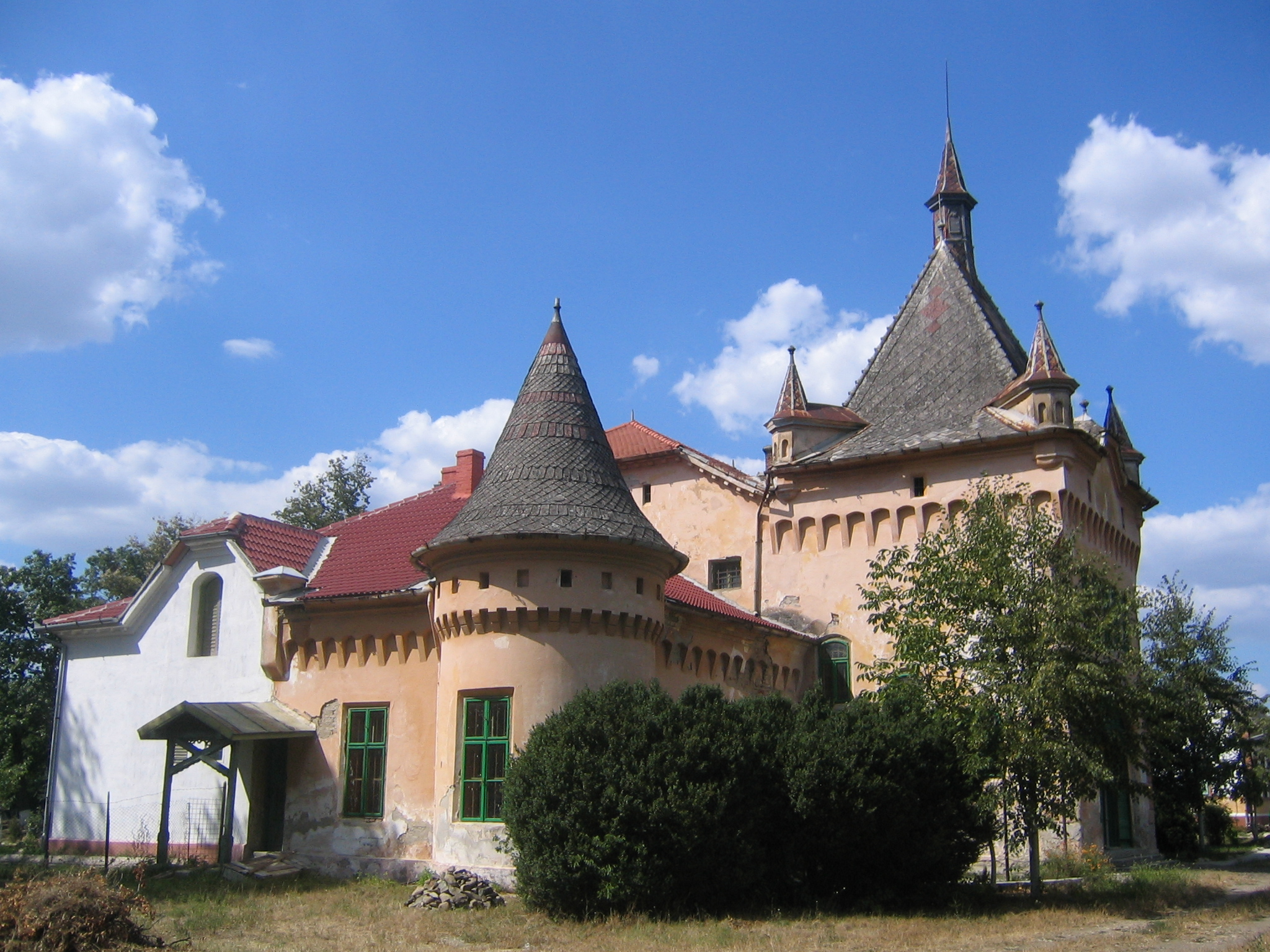
- Purgly Castle in Șofronea

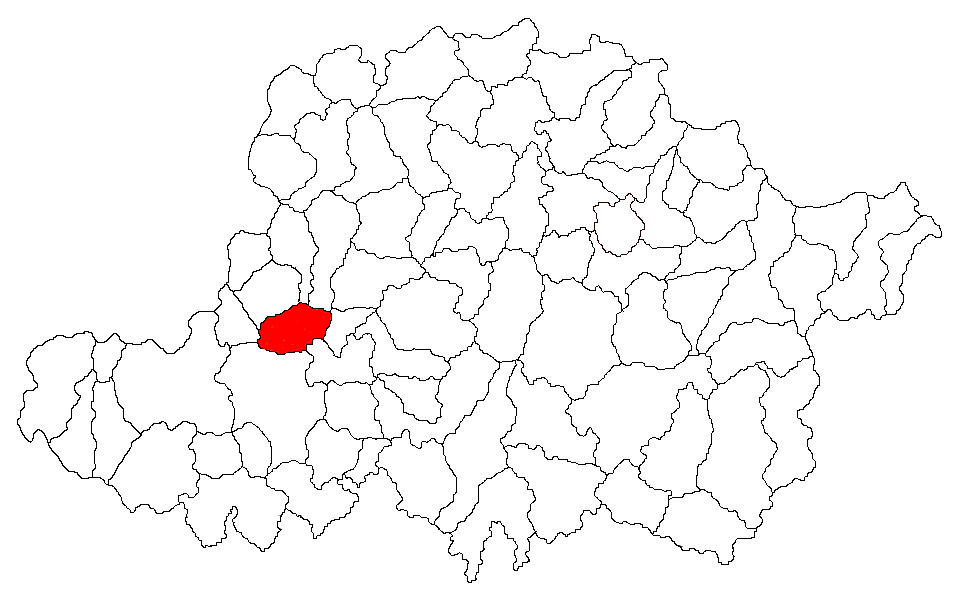
- Location in Arad County

- Location in Romania
- Coordinates: 46°16′N 21°18′E
- Country: Romania
- County: Arad

Government
  - Mayor (2020–2024): Cristian Sandu (UDMR)
- Area: 34.9 km^{2} (13.5 sq mi)
- Elevation: 107 m (351 ft)
- Population (2021-12-01): 2,887
  - Density: 82.7/km^{2} (214/sq mi)
- Time zone: UTC+02:00 (EET)
  - Summer (DST): UTC+03:00 (EEST)
- Postal code: 317350
- Vehicle reg.: AR
- Website: www.primaria-sofronea.ro

Șofronea (Hungarian: Sofronya) is a commune in Arad County, Romania, lies in the Arad Plateau and it stretches over 3,490 ha (13.5 sq mi). It is composed of two villages, Sânpaul (Szentpál), and Șofronea. It is situated at 10 km (6.2 mi) from the county capital, Arad.

== Population ==
According to the 2021 census the population of the commune counts 2,887 inhabitants.

== History ==
The first documentary record of Șofronea dates back to 1437, while Sânpaul was first mentioned in 1235.

== Natives ==
- Magdolna Purgly (1881–1959), wife of Admiral Miklós Horthy
- Ovidiu Vezan (b. 1985), footballer

== Economy ==
The commune's present-day economy can be characterized by a powerful dynamic force with significant developments in all the sectors. Commerce and light industry are intensively present on the commune's economic map.

== Tourism ==
The most popular tourist sights are the springs of thermal water with therapeutic effect in the treatment of rheumatic diseases and the complex of the Purgly Castle with its park and households, an architectural complex dating from the end of the 19th century, registered in the national cultural patrimony.

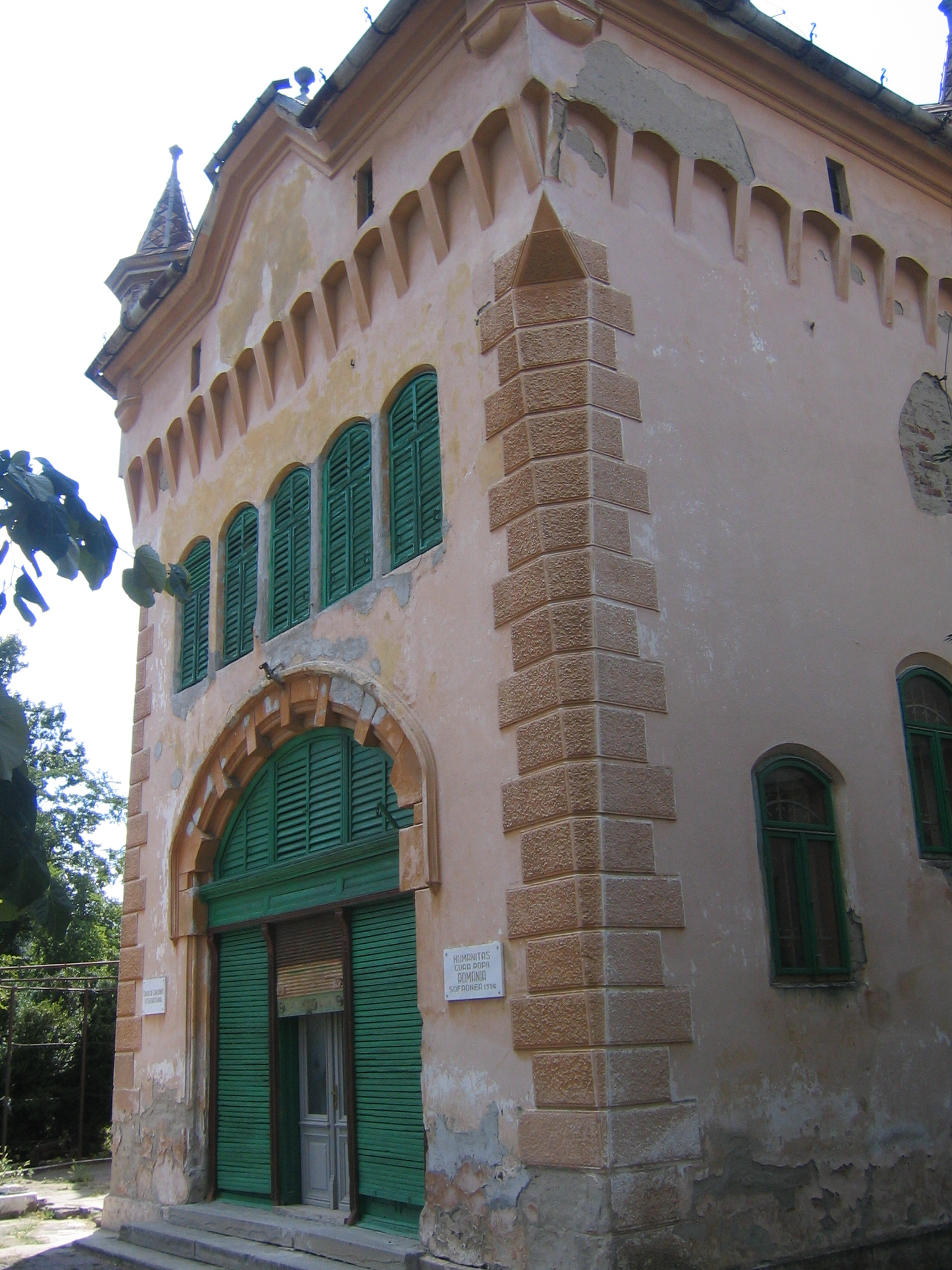
Purgly Castle (main entrance)
