= Săvârșin =

- Commune
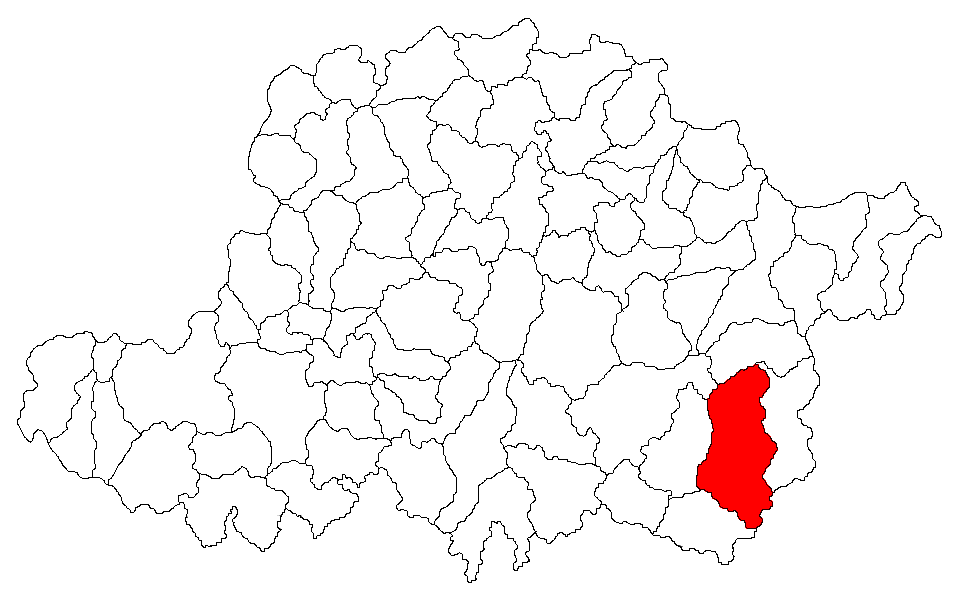
- Location in Arad County

- Location in Romania
- Coordinates: 46°1′N 22°14′E
- Country: Romania
- County: Arad
- Population (2021-12-01): 2,990
- Time zone: UTC+02:00 (EET)
  - Summer (DST): UTC+03:00 (EEST)
- Vehicle reg.: AR

Săvârșin (Hungarian: Soborsin, German: Soborschin) is a commune in Arad County, Romania. Săvârșin commune lies at the foot of the Metaliferi Mountains, at its contact point with the Mureș Couloir. Its surface occupies approximately 22000 hectares and it is composed of nine villages: Căprioara (Kaprióra), Cuiaș (Felsőköves), Hălăliș (Áldásos), Pârnești (Pernyefalva), Săvârșin (situated at 87 km from Arad), Temeșești (Temesd), Toc (Tok), Troaș (Trojás) and Valea Mare (Marosnagyvölgy).

Săvârșin is best known for the royal palace Săvârșin Castle.

== Population ==
According to the last census the population of the commune counts 3290 inhabitants, out of which 98.1% are Romanians, 1.0% Hungarians, 0.3% Ukrainians, 0.3% Serbs and 0.3% are of other or undeclared nationalities.

== History ==
The first documentary records of Săvârșin, Hălăliș, Pârnești and Temeșești date back to 1479. Căprioara was attested documentarily in 1256, Cuiaș in 1477, Toc in 1743, Troaș in 1828 and Valea Mare in 1717.

== Economy ==
Agriculture, silviculture, timber industry, industry of building materials represented by exploitation of granite (Săvârșin) and marble (Căprioara), mining based on exploitation of molybdenum (Troaș) and tourism are the main economic branches of the commune.

== Tourism ==
The natural attractions known as "Peștera lui Duțu" and "Peștera lui Sinesie", the decorative fine arts collections in Savarsin (including internasional graphic works, graphics and paintings by Eugen Popa and Gina Hagiu) and the ethnography museum in Temesesti, featuring traditional costumes, folk textiles, icons, ceramics are among the many attractions worth visiting. Other notable sites include the wooden church of "Sfinții Trei Ierarhi" (1782) in Troaș, the fortified settlement, and the archaeological sites situated in "Dâmbul Tătarilor" and "Gomile".

Beside these, there is the Săvârșin Castle (18th century), owned by former King Michael of Romania. In 2005 the royal residence in Săvârșin entered the touristic circuit, but since 2007 it has been in restoration and cannot be visited until the renovation is completed.

The village of Troaș keeps the Church of the Holy Three Hierarchs, the oldest wooden religious building in the Mureș Valley, and now property of the National Museum of the Romanian Peasant.
