= Tauț =

- Commune
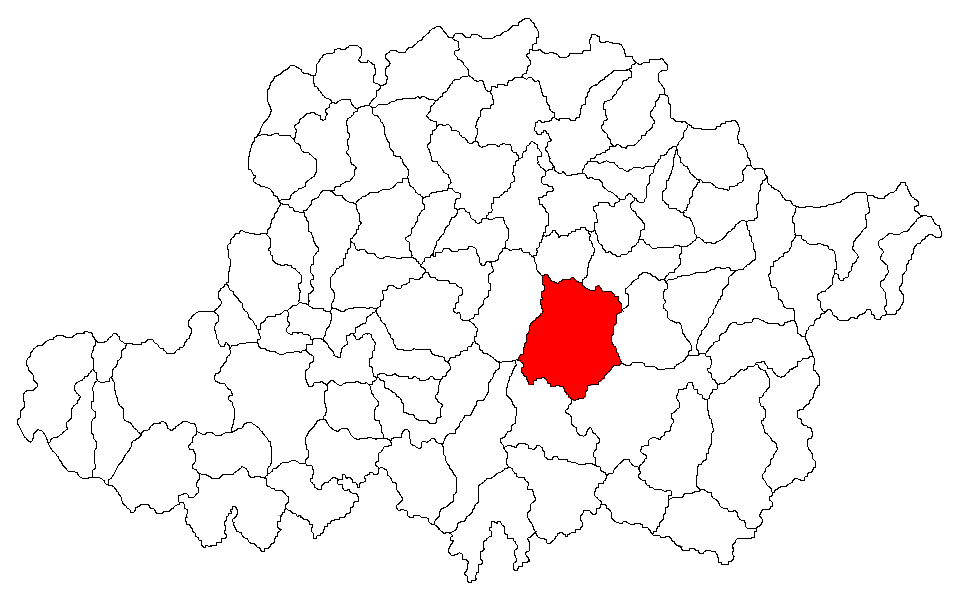
- Location in Arad County

- Location in Romania
- Coordinates: 46°17′N 21°55′E
- Country: Romania
- County: Arad
- Population (2021-12-01): 1,498
- Time zone: UTC+02:00 (EET)
  - Summer (DST): UTC+03:00 (EEST)
- Vehicle reg.: AR

Tauț (Hungarian: Feltót) is a commune in Arad County, Romania. It is situated in the contact zone of the Cigherului Hills and Zărandului Mountains, in the hydrographical basin of the river Cigher. The administrative territory of the commune is 10,617 hectares. It is composed of four villages: Minișel, Minișu de Sus, Nadăș and Tauț (situated 55 km from Arad).

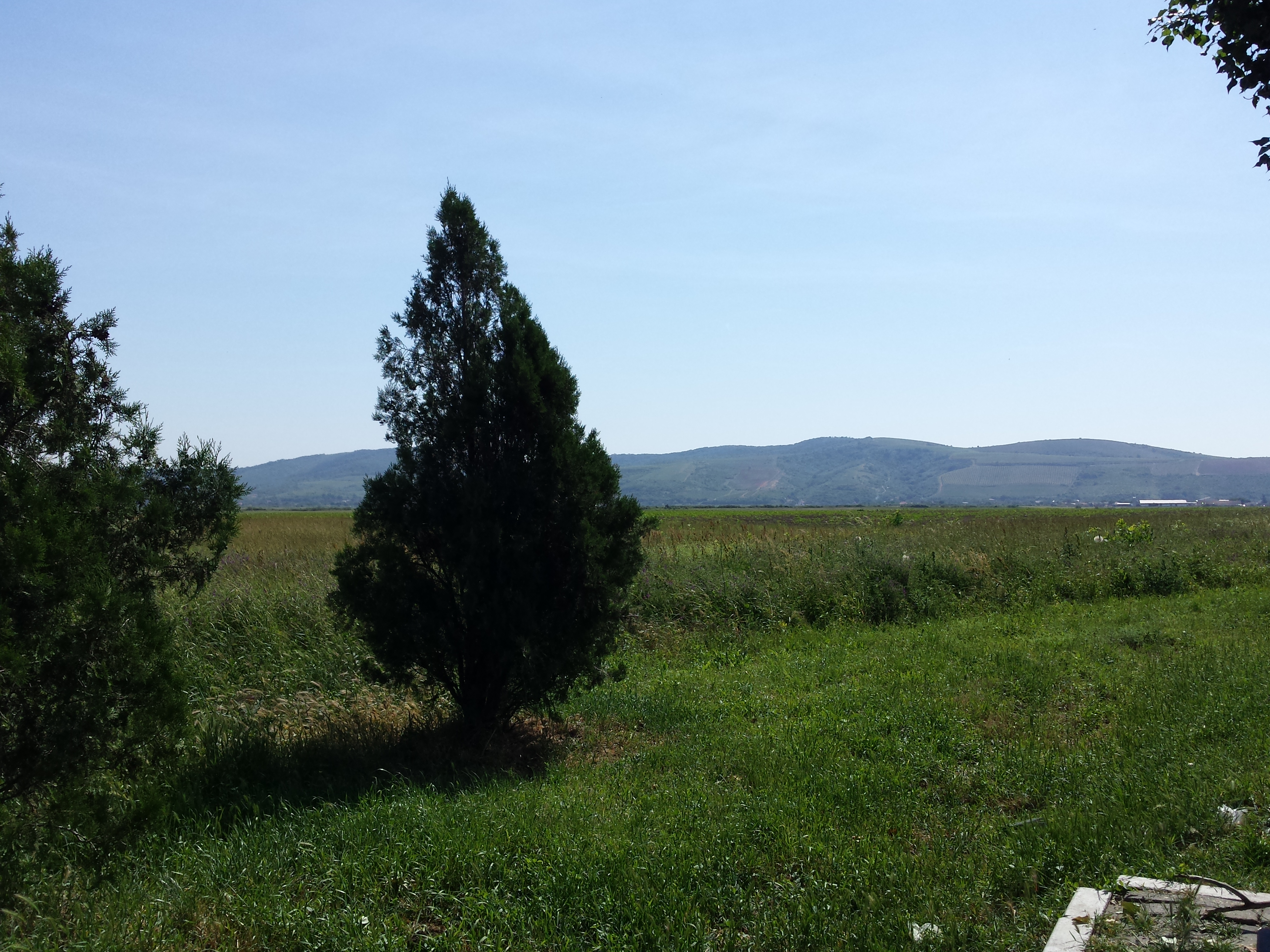
Countryside view

== Population ==
According to the last census, the population of the commune counts 2177 inhabitants, out of which 98.7% are Romanians, 0.2% Hungarians, 0.4% Roms, 0.5% Ukrainians and 0.2% are of other or undeclared nationalities.

== History ==
The first documentary record of the locality Tauț dates back to 1496. Minișel, Nadăș and Minișu de Sus were first mentioned in 1561, 1464 and 1746 respectively.

== Economy ==
Among the exploitable resources are the diatomite in Minișu de Sus. In the last few years tourism and the activities of the tertiary economic sector are showing increasing tendencies in the economic spectrum of the commune.

== Tourism ==
The commune of Tauț has become a local resort over the years, with many from the neighbouring municipality of Arad buying summer or winter vacation cottages there. Tauț's features for tourists include a man-made barrage lake for fishing and swimming, the largest of its kind in the county, built during the socialist era before 1989.

Tauț's recent investments include a rustic wooden cottage complex with a pool and bar just on the outskirts of Taut, on the bank of the Taut Barrage.

The ruins of a small stone fort was also discovered nearby. Several artefacts discovered with it are being displayed in the Arad Museum.

There is also a medieval castle in Tauț surrounded by blindages, dating from the 13–15th centuries.
