= Târnova, Arad =

Târnova
- Commune
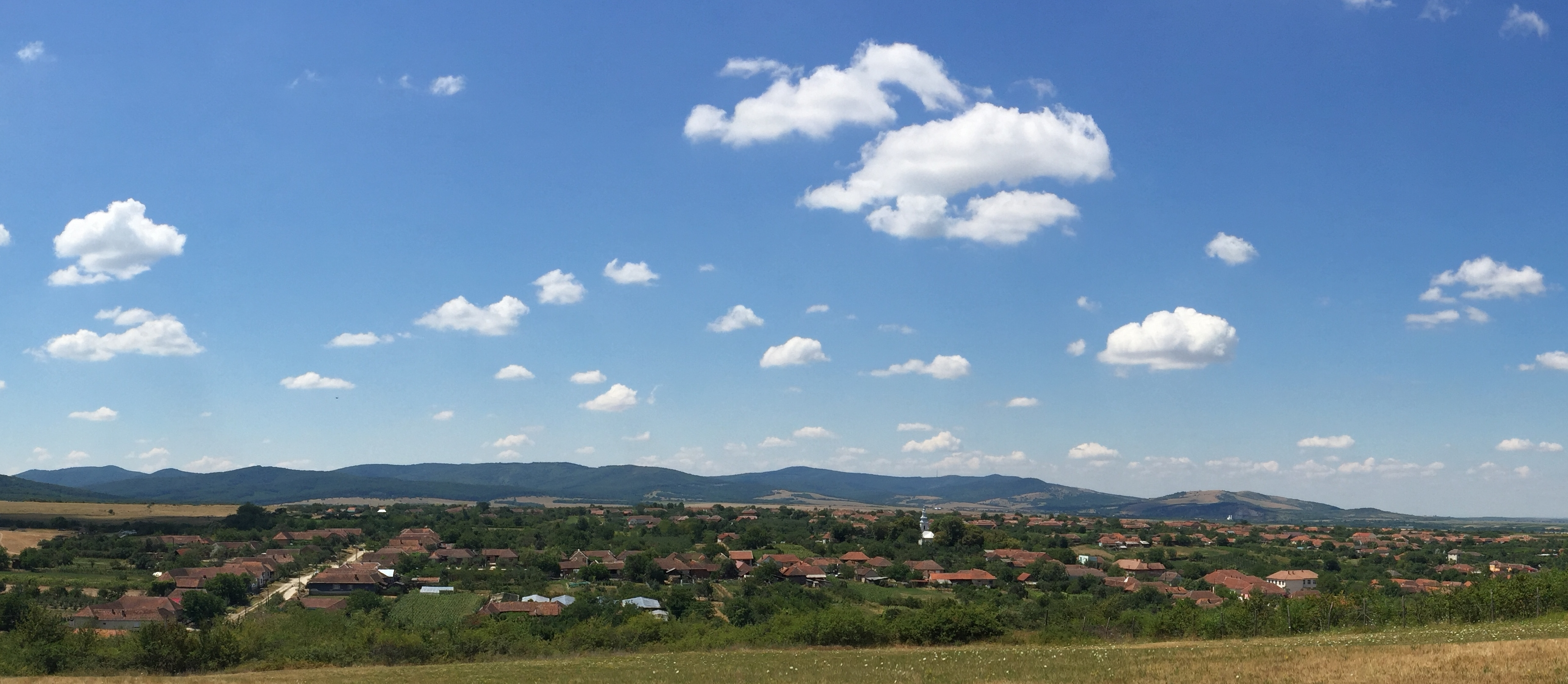
- Drauț

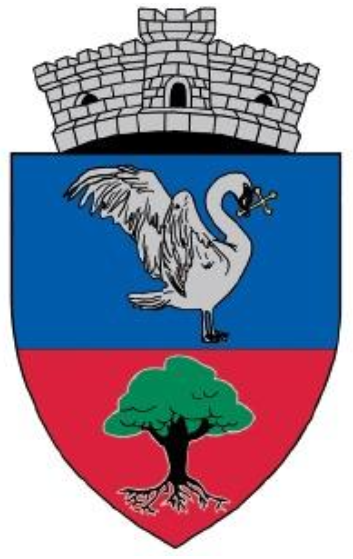
- Coat of arms

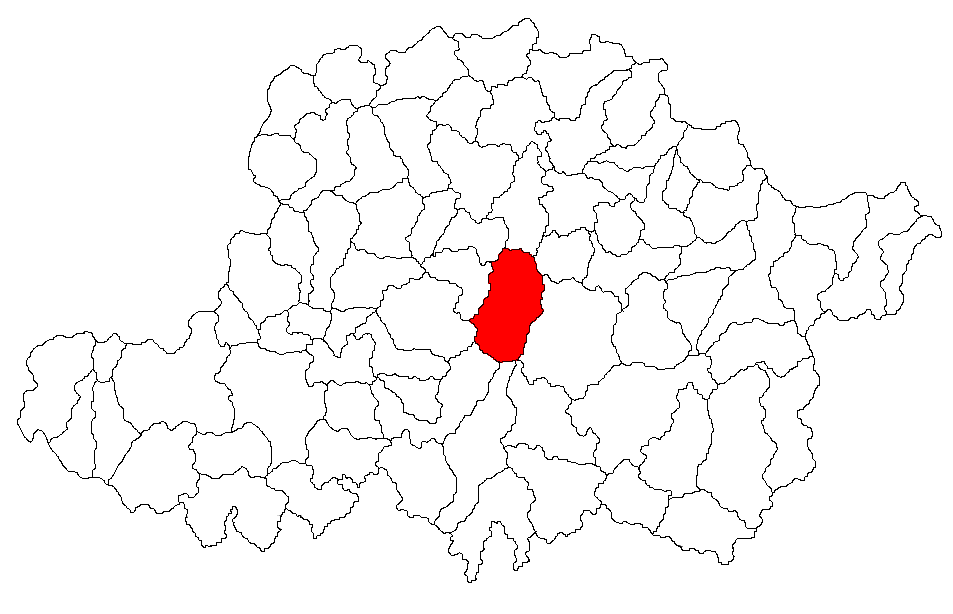
- Location in Arad County

- Location in Romania
- Coordinates: 46.3167°N 21.8°E
- Country: Romania
- County: Arad

Government
  - Mayor (2024–2028): Emilia Ignișca (PSD)
- Area: 207.44 km^{2} (80.09 sq mi)
- Elevation: 122 m (400 ft)
- Population (2021-12-01): 5,625
  - Density: 27.12/km^{2} (70.23/sq mi)
- Time zone: UTC+02:00 (EET)
  - Summer (DST): UTC+03:00 (EEST)
- Postal code: 317360
- Area code: (+40) 0257
- Vehicle reg.: AR
- Website: e-comune.ro/primaria-tarnova-ar

Târnova (Hungarian: Tornova) is a commune in Arad County, Romania, is situated in the contact zone of the Cigherului Hills and Zărandului Mountains, it occupies approximately 207.44 km^{2} (80.09 sq mi). The commune is composed of six villages: Agrișu Mare (Almásegres), Arăneag (Székesaranyág), Chier (Kurtakér), Drauț (Doroszlófalva), Dud (Dúd), and Târnova (situated at 44 km from Arad).

== Population ==
Historical population
Year	Pop.	±%
1880	10,151	—
1910	13,458	+32.6%
1930	11,491	−14.6%
1977	7,748	−32.6%
1992	6,144	−20.7%
2002	6,240	+1.6%
2011	5,935	−4.9%
2021	5,625	−5.2%
Source: Census data

According to 2002 census, the commune had 6,240 inhabitants; 86% were Romanians, 10.7% Ukrainians, 2.2% Roma, 0.6% Hungarians, and 0.5% of other or undeclared nationalities. As of the 2021 census, Târnova had a population of 5,625; of those, 75.98% were Romanians, 8.55% Ukrainians, and 2.12% Roma.

== History ==
The first documentary record of the locality Târnova dates back to 1406, Agrișu Mare was first mentioned in 1214, Arăneag in 1390, Chier in 1325, Drauț in 1406, and Dud in 1169.

== Natives ==
- Cornelia Bodea (1916–2010), historian, titular member of the Romanian Academy
- Florian Coldea (born 1971), general, interim director of the Romanian Intelligence Service (2006, 2015)

== Economy ==
The commune's economy is prevalently agrarian, Târnova being a well-known fructiferous area. Small industry and the tertiary sector are also well-developed.

== Tourism ==
The Agrișu Mare Castle dating from the 15th century, situated on the Cioaca Hill is the main touristic attraction of the commune. Chier is known for its pieces of embroidery.
