= Zimandu Nou =

Zimandu Nou Zimándújfalu
- Commune
- Location within the county

- Location in Romania
- Coordinates: 46°17′N 21°24′E
- Country: Romania
- County: Arad
- Population (2021-12-01): 4,663
- Time zone: EET/EEST (UTC+2/+3)
- Vehicle reg.: AR

Zimandu Nou (Hungarian: Zimándújfalu) is a commune located in Arad County, Romania, is situated in the Arad Plateau and it stretches over 7430 hectares.

== Administration ==
It is composed of three villages:

In Romanian	In Hungarian	Ethnic majority
Andrei Șaguna	Ötvenespuszta	Romanians
Zimandcuz	Zimándköz	Hungarians
Zimandu Nou	Zimándújfalu	Hungarians

== Population ==
According to the 2011 census, the population of the commune counts 4476 inhabitants, out of which 63.31% are Romanians, 34.31% Hungarians, 1,89% Roms, 0,2% Germans and 0,3% are of other or undeclared nationalities.

== History ==
The first documentary record of Zimandu Nou dates back to 1913. Andrei Șaguna was attested documentarily in 1855, while Zimandcuz in 1743.

Zimandu Nou is a village located in the north of Arad City the capital of Arad County (close to Arad City - linked to it by trains and buses - public services) on the main road to Oradea. Zimandu Nou (Zimandujfalu in Hungarian) was founded in 1853 on the Zimand puszta. Area: 74,3 km^{2}. Population: 4,489 (2002).

The installing of the Habsburg rule (1687) marks the beginning of urban planning in Arad City. German colonists and the Serb frontier guard troops essentially contributed to this. The maps drawn by the middle of the 18th century show four sectors of the town: the fortress, the withdrawal region (retirade), the "German town" and the "Serb town". Evolution of town planning stopped in second half of the century. There are to major reasons to this: the Serb emigration to Russia and, more important, the orders coming from Vienna that prohibited any construction near the old fortress. After the new fortress got into construction, beside the old interdiction a new problem occurred. Austrian Empress Maria Theresa of Austria planned to have the whole population and town of Arad moved to the Zimand puszta (or praedium), mostly uninhabited during the 18th century and until 1852. Vienna gave up the plan in 1781.

The inhabitants are today mostly Hungarians and Romanians living together in three villages.

Zimandu Nou (Zimándújfalu in Hungarian) was founded in 1850 by 1,032 farmers from Csernovics-Ujfalu, Arad County. They were originally from Northern Hungary, from the Nograd county and were cultivating tobacco. As there were troubling relations with the farmers since 1848 (it is rumored that the landlord of Csernovics Ujfalu, Csernovics Péter, in fact lost his property on a card game), the new landlord decided to dismantle the tobacco growing community, the farmers moving to the Zimand pusta, forming the village of Zimandul Nou in 1852.

Zimandcuz (Zimándköz or Zimánd-Bankut in Hungarian) was formed in 1853 by 92 Hungarian Roman Catholic families of free farmers who were ousted by their landlords in the west part of Arad County, Bánkút puszta. They were probably Magyarized Slovaks from the Heves and Hont counties situated in northern Hungary and were brought to Bánkút puszta to cultivate tobacco, between 1843 and 1853, for Samuel Wodianer, renowned banker and landlord, son of Philip Wodianer. As the tobacco business became less and less profitable, the landlord decided to oust farmers from 172 houses after the contract between him and them expired in 1846. Since the farmers in Bánkút puszta could not afford to pay their obligations to the landlord, the army was finally sent against them on 9 March 1852 and the whole village was surrounded. Forced expropriation of goods and animals followed, along with the brutal destruction of 72 houses. Even after this move, only 10% of the farmers' obligations could be recuperated. As a result, most farmers were ousted, being given travel documents. Only six families remained in Bánkút puszta, the settlement being practically dismantled and depopulated for quite a number of years.

Andrei Șaguna was founded in 1921 by Romanian Orthodox families, from lands following the dispossession of the Zelenski manor, due to the Romania's agrarian reform of 1921.

There is another settlement named Utvinis (Ötvenes in Hungarian), also part of the former Zelenski manor, now part of the Zimandu Nou village.

Zimandu Nou area is part of the future Arad Metropolitan Area.

Each year in the middle of July people from Zimandu Nou celebrate "The Days of Zimand" a local fest, when everyone originally from Zimand join together to celebrate the village.

== Economy ==
The commune's economy is prevalently agrarian, based on growing of grain, technical crops and plants.

== Tourism ==
Although the three villages of the commune are seen by tourists as transit localities situated along the European road connecting Arad and Oradea, Zimandu Nou has attractive tourist elements as the Utviniș Forest, a forestal reservation with planetree and Turkish hazel bush, as well as the Military Channel, a significant engineering work.
