= Hălmăgel =

- Commune
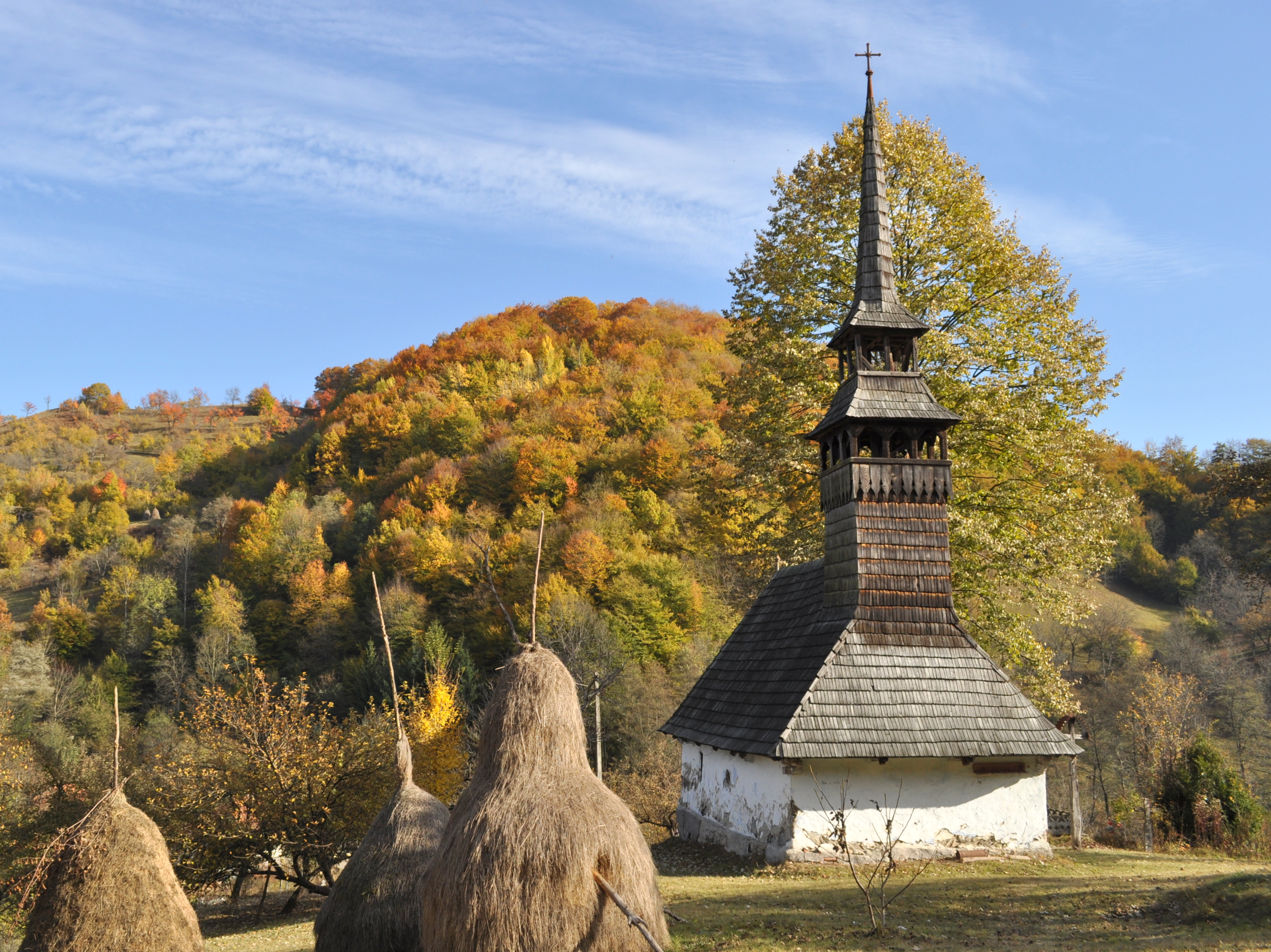
- Luncșoara wooden church

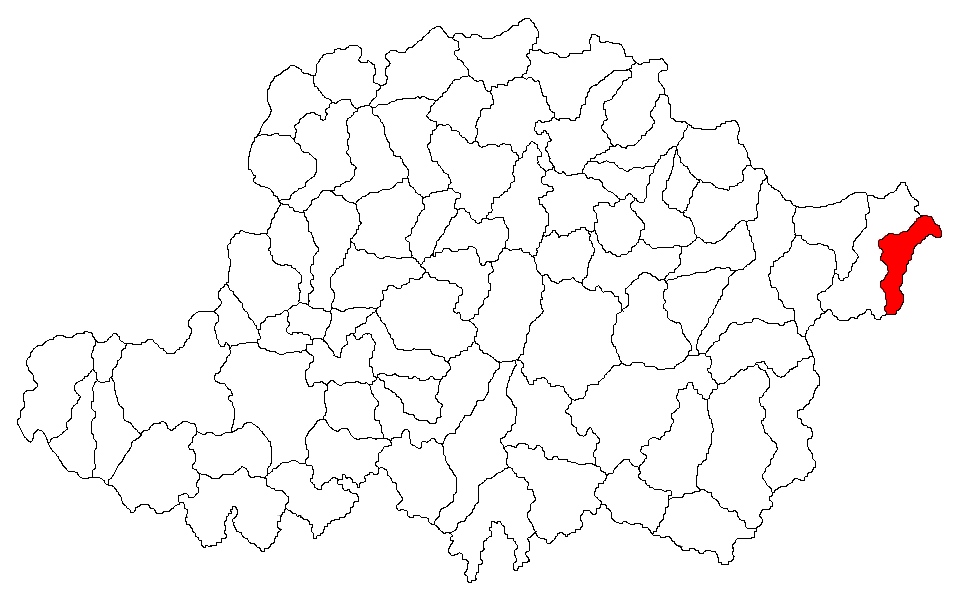
- Location in Arad County

- Location in Romania
- Coordinates: 46°16′N 22°37′E
- Country: Romania
- County: Arad
- Population (2021-12-01): 973
- Time zone: UTC+02:00 (EET)
  - Summer (DST): UTC+03:00 (EEST)
- Vehicle reg.: AR

Hălmăgel (Hungarian: Kishalmágy) is a commune in Arad County, Crișana, Romania. It is situated in the Hălmagiu Basin, at the foot of Bihor Mountains, along the Hălmăgel River. It occupies approximately 7000 ha and it is composed of five villages: Hălmăgel (situated at 140 km from Arad), Luncșoara (Hosszúsor), Sârbi (Szerb), Târnăvița (Fazekastarnó) and Țohești (Csohosd).

== Population ==
According to the last census the population of the commune counts 1656 inhabitants, all of them being of Romanian nationality.

== History ==
The first documentary record of the locality Hălmăgel dates back to 1439. Luncșoara, Târnăvița and Țohești were first mentioned in documents in 1760–1762, while Sârbi in 1561.

== Economy ==
Although the economy of the commune is mainly agrarian, based on livestockbreeding and farming, logging, conversion of timber, food industry and industry of building materials are also wellrepresented. Small industry based on handicraft is present in Târnăvița through workshops of popular, enamelled ceramics.

== Tourism ==
Due to the mountainous landscapes of the south-western slopes of Găina Mountains, the ethnofolkloric richness of the zone, as well as the traditional architecture, the commune has become a quite attractive place. The rural festival called "Girls' Fair of Găina Mountains" celebrated every year is the most important event in the area drawing thousands of tourists. The wooden churches called "Sfinții Arhangheli Mihail și Gavril" (17th century) and "Sfântul Gheorghe" (1835) in Luncșoara, both being historical and architectural monuments, are worth visiting.
