= Arad County =

County of Romania

Arad County Județul Arad
- County
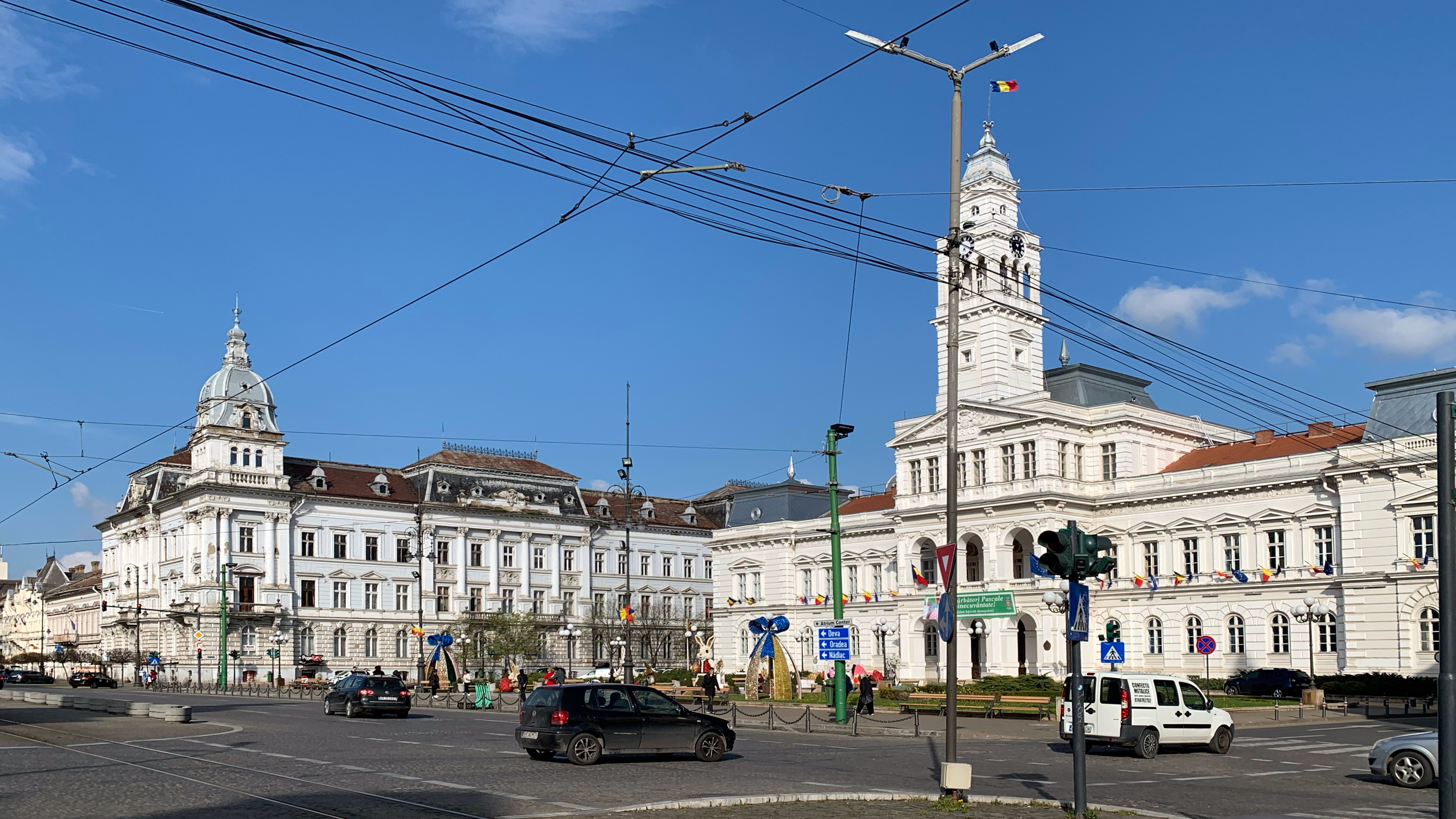
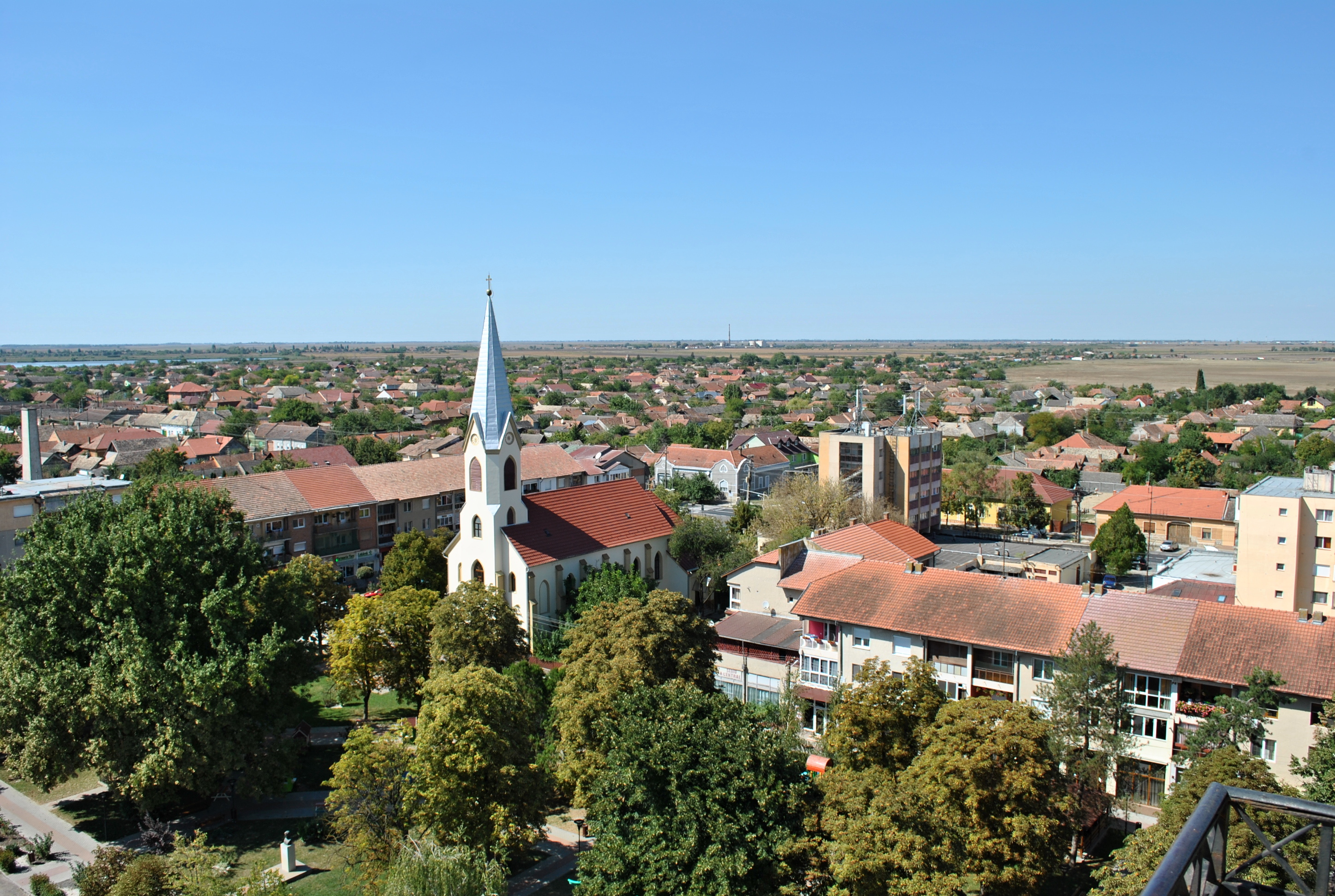
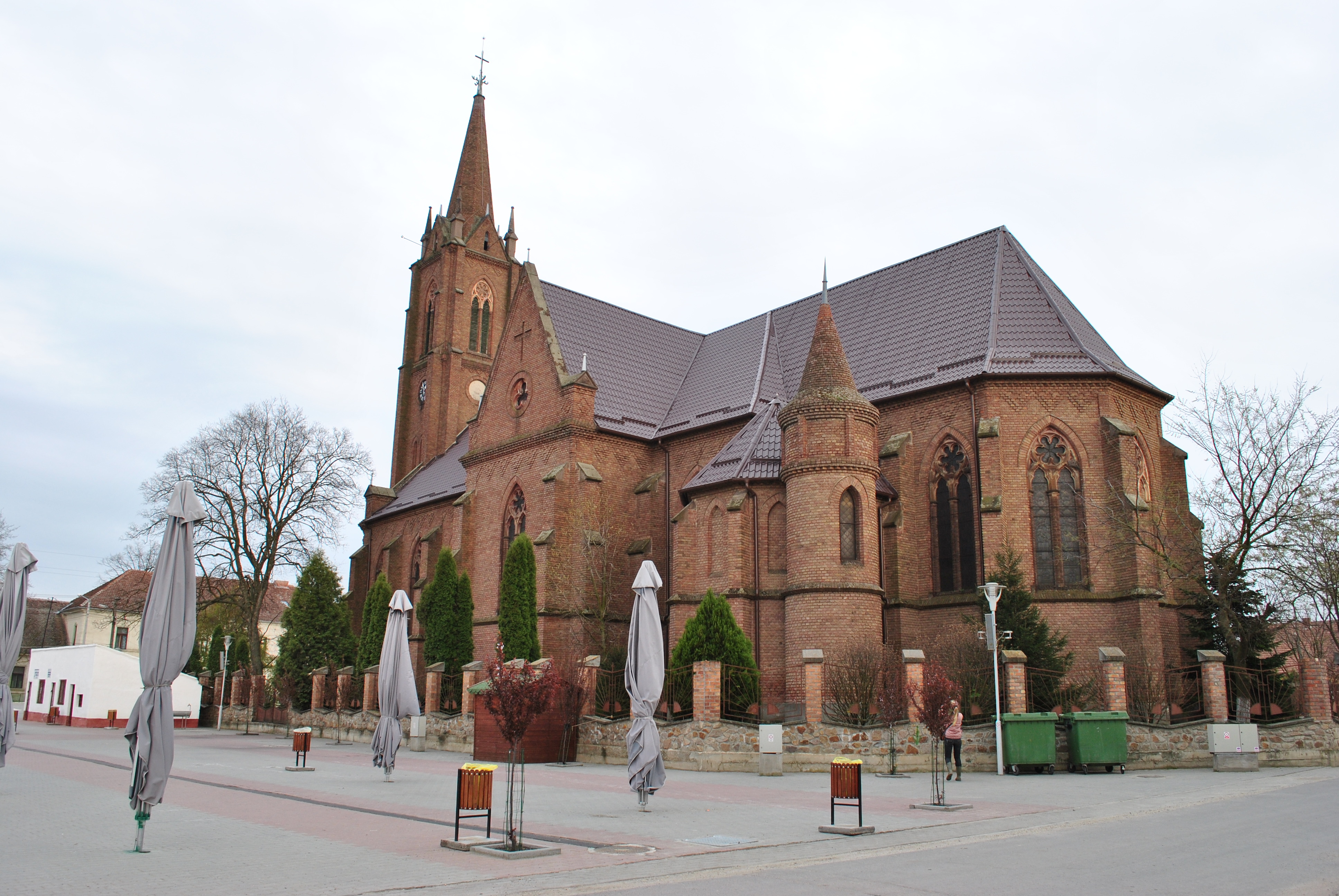
- Arad Nădlac Pecica

- Flag Coat of arms

- Location of Arad County in Romania
- Coordinates: 46.36°N 21.8°E
- Country: Romania
- Development region^{1}: Vest
- Historic region: Crișana
- Capital city (Reședința de județ): Arad
- Județul Arad: 1968

Government
  - Type: County Council
  - President of the County Board: Iustin Cionca (PNL)
  - Prefect^{2}: Csaba Tóth

Area
  - Total: 7,754 km^{2} (2,994 sq mi)
  - Rank: 5th in Romania
- Elevation: 1,486 m (4,875 ft)

Population (2021-12-01)
  - Total: 410,143
  - Rank: 21st in Romania
  - Density: 52.89/km^{2} (137.0/sq mi)
- Time zone: UTC+2 (EET)
  - Summer (DST): UTC+3 (EEST)
- Postal Code: 31wxyz^{3}
- Area code: +40 x57^{4}
- Car Plates: AR^{5}
- GDP: US$ 7.740 billion (2025)
- GDP per capita: US$ 18,871 (2025)
- Website: County Council; County Prefecture
- ^{1} The development regions of Romania have no administrative role and were formed in order to manage funds from the European Union.^{2} as of 2007, the Prefect is not a politician, but a public functionary. He (or she) is not allowed to be a member of a political party, and is banned from having any political activity in the first six months after his resignation (or exclusion) from the public functionaries' corps.^{3}w, x, y, and z are digits that indicate the city, the street, part of the street, or even the building of the address^{4}x is a digit indicating the operator: 2 for the former national operator, Romtelecom, and 3 for the other ground telephone networks^{5}used on both the plates of the vehicles that operate only in the county limits (like utilitary vehicles and ATVs, etc.), and the ones used outside the county

Arad County (Romanian pronunciation: [aˈrad]) is an administrative division (județ) of Romania roughly translated into county in the western part of the country on the border with Hungary, mostly in the region of Crișana and a few villages in Banat. The administrative center of the county lies in the city of Arad. The Arad County is part of the Danube–Criș–Mureș–Tisa Euroregion.

== Name ==
In Hungarian, it is known as Arad megye, in Serbian as Арадски округ, and in German as Kreis Arad. The county was named after its administrative center, Arad.

== Geography ==
The county has a total area of 7,754 km^{2} (2,994 sq mi), representing 3.6% of national Romanian territory. The terrain of Arad County is divided into two distinct units that cover almost half of the county each. The eastern side of the county has a hilly to low mountainous terrain (Dealurile Lipovei, Munții Zărandului, Munții Codru Moma) and on the western side it's a plain zone consisting of the Arad Plain, Low Mures Plain, and The High Vinga Plain. Taking altitude into account we notice that it follows a stepped pattern as it drops as we go from the east to the west of the county from 1489 m to below 100 m. In the east there are the Zarand Mountains and the Codru Moma Mountains, all subdivisions of the Apuseni Mountains, a major group of the Western Carpathians.

=== Neighbours ===
- Alba County and Hunedoara County to the East.
- Hungary to the West - Békés and Csongrád-Csanád Counties.
- Bihor County to the North.
- Timiș County to the South.

=== Climate and precipitation ===
In terms of climate, the characteristics of Arad county have a typical temperate continental climate with oceanic influences, with a circulation of air masses with a predominantly western ordered direction visible from west to east, with increasing altitude. Average annual temperatures range from 10 °C in the lowlands, the hills and piedmonts 9 °C, 8 °C and 6 °C in the low mountains in the area of greatest height. Average amounts of precipitation is between 565 and 600 mm (22.2 and 23.6 in) annually in the lowlands, 700 and 800 mm (28 and 31 in) annually in the hills and piedmonts and 800 and 1,200 mm (31 and 47 in) annually in the mountainous area.

=== Hydrographic network ===
The hydrographic network is composed of the two main rivers plus their tributaries and channels.

- Mureș - Corbeasca, Troaș, Bârzava, Milova, Cladova
- Crișul Alb - Hălmăgel, Valea de la Lazuri, Tăcășele, Cremenoasa, Zimbru, Valea Deznei, Valea Monesei, Tălagiu, Honțisor, Chisindia, Cigher

==== Lakes, ponds and channels ====
- Tauț, Seleuș, Cermei, Rovine, Matca (Ghioroc) Lakes and Gypsy Pond
- Matca, Canalul Morilor, Canalul Morilor, Ier, Criș Channels

== Economy ==
Along with Timiș County it forms one of the most developed regions in Romania. Due to its proximity to the border, it attracts a great number of foreign investments. The agricultural potential is greatly put into value, Arad plains being considered one of the most important cereal and vegetable producing basins.

The predominant industries in the county are:

- Machine and automotive components
- Food
- Textiles

Natural resources in Arad, are worthy to be taken into account as there are oil and associated gases, points of extraction in the west of the county, molybdenum mines in the Săvârșin area, marble quarries at Căprioara and Moneasa, mineral waters at Lipova, Moneasa, Dorobanți, Curtici, Macea and uranium deposits in the NE part of the county.

== Tourism ==
The main tourist destinations are:

- The city of Arad;
- The Mureș Natural Floodplain Park;
- Bezdin Monastery;
- Hodoș-Bodrog Monastery (est. 1177);
- Lipova resort and city;
- Șoimoș, Dezna, and Șiria stone citadels;
- Moneasa resort;
- The areas around Săvârșin, Petriș, Macea, and Pecica.

== Demographics ==
According to the 2021 census, the county had a population of 410,143 and the population density was 52.9/km^{2} (137.0/sq mi).

Ethnic composition of Arad County (2021)
1. Romanians (77.5%)
2. Hungarians (6.27%)
3. Romani (4.08%)
4. Slovaks (0.81%)
5. Germans (Banat Swabians) (0.49%)
6. Ukrainians (0.23%)
7. Serbs (0.12%)
8. Bulgarians (0.12%)
9. Others (10.4%)
Religious composition of Arad County (2021)
1. Romanian Orthodox (73.1%)
2. Pentecostals (9.19%)
3. Roman Catholics (7.54%)
4. Baptists (3.42%)
5. Reformed (2.06%)
6. Adventists (1.13%)
7. Greek Catholics (0.83%)
8. Lutherans (0.73%)
9. Others (1.17%)
10. Irreligious, atheist and agnostic (0.86%)

Year	County population
1948	476,207
1956	475,620 ▼
1966	481,248 ▲
1977	512,020 ▲
1992	487,370 ▼
2002	461,791 ▼
2011	430,629 ▼
2021	410,143 ▼

== Politics ==
The Arad County Council, renewed at the 2024 local elections, consists of 32 counsellors, with the following party composition:

Party	Seats	Current County Council
National Liberal Party (PNL)	13	
Social Democratic Party (PSD)	9	
Alliance for the Union of Romanians (AUR)	5	
Save Romania Union (USR)	2	
Democratic Alliance of Hungarians in Romania (UDMR/RMDSZ)	2	
People's Movement Party (PMP)	1	

== Administrative divisions ==
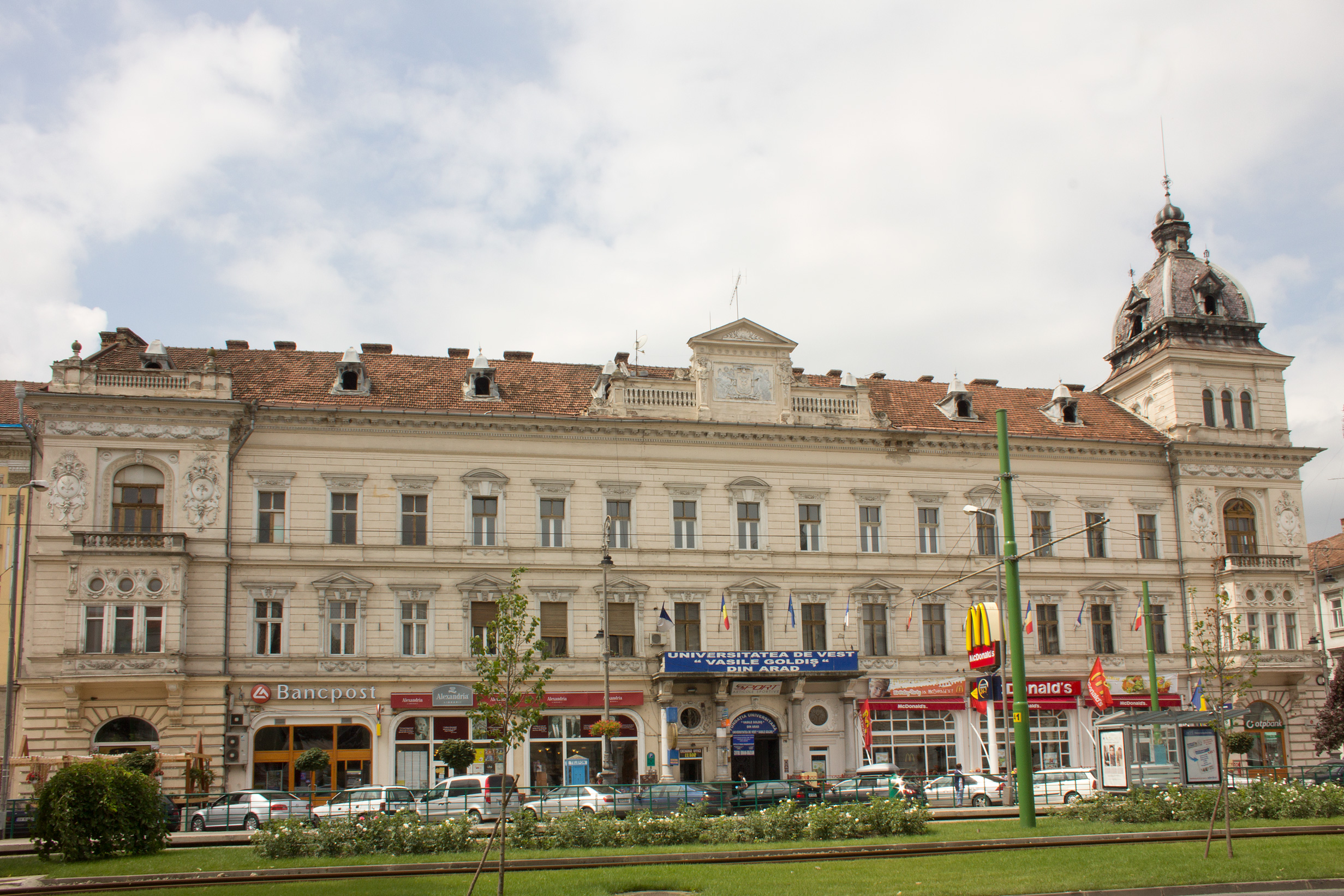
Arad

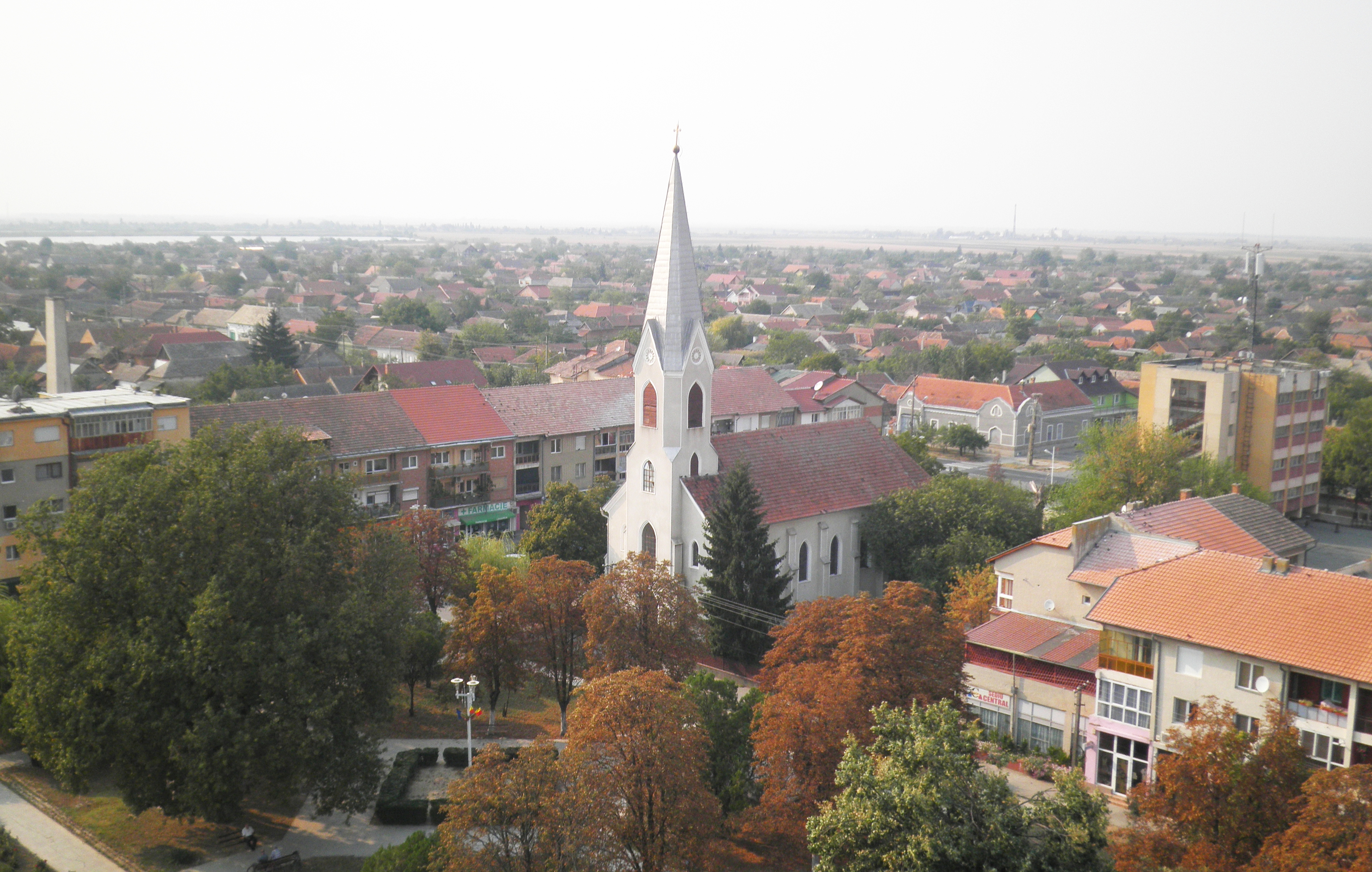
The border town of Nădlac

Arad County has 1 municipality, 9 towns and 68 communes with approximately 180 villages.

Municipalities

- Arad - capital city; population: 172,827 (as of 2002)

Towns

- Chișineu-Criș
- Curtici
- Ineu
- Lipova
- Nădlac
- Pâncota
- Pecica
- Sântana
- Sebiș

Communes

- Almaș
- Apateu
- Archiș
- Bata
- Bârsa
- Bârzava
- Beliu
- Birchiș
- Bocsig
- Brazii
- Buteni
- Cărand
- Cermei
- Chisindia
- Conop
- Covăsânț
- Craiva
- Dezna
- Dieci
- Dorobanți
- Fântânele
- Felnac
- Frumușeni
- Ghioroc
- Grăniceri
- Gurahonț
- Hălmagiu
- Hălmăgel
- Hășmaș
- Ignești
- Iratoșu
- Livada
- Macea
- Mișca
- Moneasa
- Olari
- Păuliș
- Peregu Mare
- Petriș
- Pilu
- Pleșcuța
- Săvârșin
- Secusigiu
- Seleuș
- Semlac
- Sintea Mare
- Socodor
- Șagu
- Șeitin
- Șepreuș
- Șicula
- Șilindia
- Șimand
- Șiria
- Șiștarovăț
- Șofronea
- Tauț
- Târnova
- Ususău
- Vărădia de Mureș
- Vârfurile
- Vinga
- Vladimirescu
- Zăbrani
- Zădăreni
- Zărand
- Zerind
- Zimandu Nou

== Historical county ==
Județul Arad
- County (Județ)
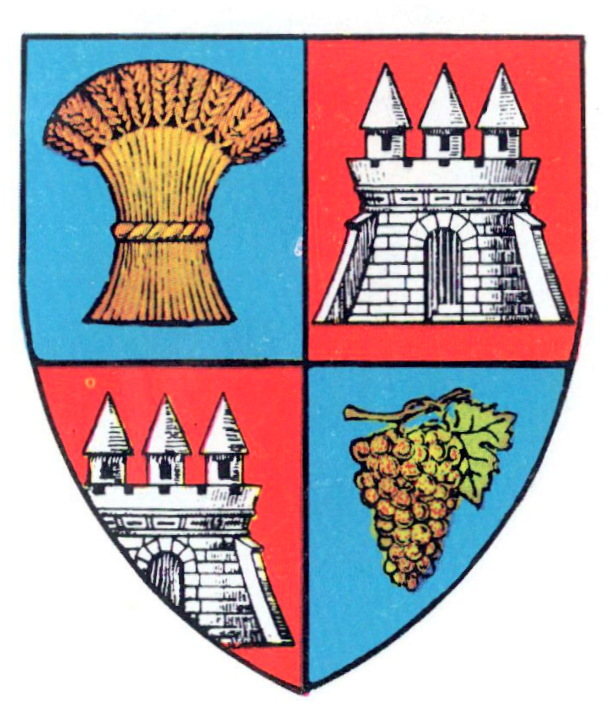
- Coat of arms

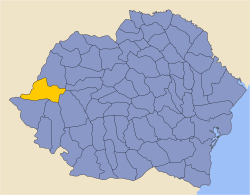
- Country: Romania
- Historic region: Crișana
- Capital city (Reședință de județ): Arad
- Ceased to exist: 1950

Area
  - Total: 6,248 km^{2} (2,412 sq mi)

Population (1930)
  - Total: 423,469
  - Density: 67.78/km^{2} (175.5/sq mi)
- Time zone: UTC+2 (EET)
  - Summer (DST): UTC+3 (EEST)

=== Administration ===
In 1930, the county was divided into nine districts (plăși):

1. Plasa Aradul-Nou (comprising 22 villages)
2. Plasa Chișineu-Criș (comprising 19 villages)
3. Plasa Hălmagiu (comprising 45 villages)
4. Plasa Ineu (comprising 15 villages)
5. Plasa Pecica (comprising 12 villages)
6. Plasa Sfânta Ana (comprising 13 villages)
7. Plasa Sebiș (comprising 37 villages)
8. Plasa Șiria (comprising 11 villages)
9. Plasa Radna (comprising 36 villages)

Subsequently, a tenth district was established having been carved out of Plasa Ineu:

10. Plasa Târnova (comprising 16 villages)

Administration was re-organized in 1947, comprising 13 districts:

1. Plasa Aradul-Nou
2. Plasa Chișineu-Criș
3. Plasa Curtici
4. Plasa Gurahonț
5. Plasa Hălmagiu
6. Plasa Ineu
7. Plasa Pecica
8. Plasa Radna
9. Plasa Săvârșin
10. Plasa Sebiș
11. Plasa Sfânta Ana
12. Plasa Șiria
13. Plasa Târnova

=== Population ===
According to the 1930 census data, the county population was 423,469 inhabitants, 61.0% Romanians, 19.5% Hungarians, 12.3% Germans (Banat Swabians), 2.8% Slovaks, 2.1% Jews, as well as other minorities. From the religious point of view, 55.8% declared Eastern Orthodox, 26.5% Roman Catholic, 5.5% Reformed, 4.2% Greek Catholic, 3.2% Lutherans, 2.4% Jewish, 1% Baptists, as well as other minorities.

==== Urban population ====
In 1930, the county's urban population was 77,181 inhabitants, 39.3% Romanians, 38.8% Hungarians, 9.1% Jews, 7.1% Germans (Banat Swabians), 1.7% Serbs and Croats, 1.4% Slovaks, as well as other minorities. In the urban area, languages were Hungarian (53.3%), Romanian (37.0%), German (6.0%), Serbian (1.4%), Yiddish (0.9%), as well as other minorities. From the religious point of view, the urban population was composed of Roman Catholics (38.5%), Eastern Orthodox (33.8%), Jewish (10.1%), Reformed (9.9%), Greek Catholics (4.0%), Lutherans (2.6%), as well as other minorities.

=== Industry ===
The county's capital, Arad, was the location of Romania's first automotive factory. During the 1920s, Astra cars and commercial vehicles were made at Arad. ASTRA Arad manufactured automobiles from 1922 to 1926. The factory had an output of 2 automobiles per working day as of 1922.

== See also ==
- Arad County of the Kingdom of Hungary
