= List of castles and fortresses in Romania =

This is a list of castles and fortresses in Romania which have been declared historic monuments by the Romanian Ministry of Culture.

== Banat ==
Caraș-Severin (6)

- Bey's Fortress, Socolari
- Caransebeș Fortress, Caransebeș
- Cuiești Fortress, Bocșa
- Ladislau Fortress, Coronini
- Mehadia Fortress, Mehadia
- Turk's Fortress (Turski Grad), Carașova

Timiș (10)

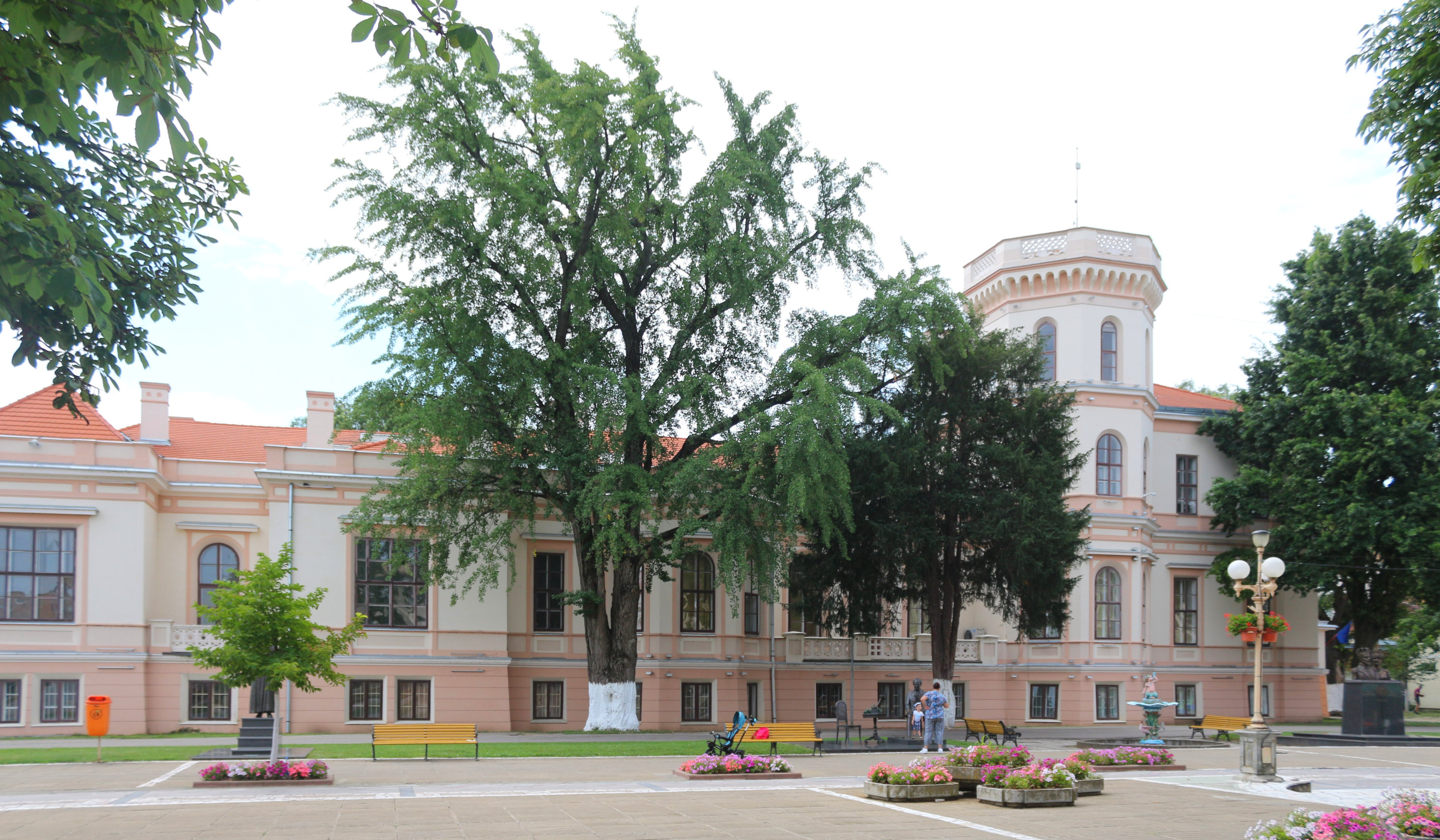
Nákó (Sânnicolau Mare)

- Ciacova Fortress, Ciacova
- Făget Fortress, Făget
- Huniade Castle, Timișoara
- Jdioara Fortress, Jdioara
- Karátsonyi Castle, Banloc
- Margina Fortress, Margina
- Castle of Count de Mercy, Carani
- Morisena Fortress, Cenad
- Nákó Castle, Sânnicolau Mare
- Timișoara Fortress, Timișoara

== Bukovina ==
Suceava (3)

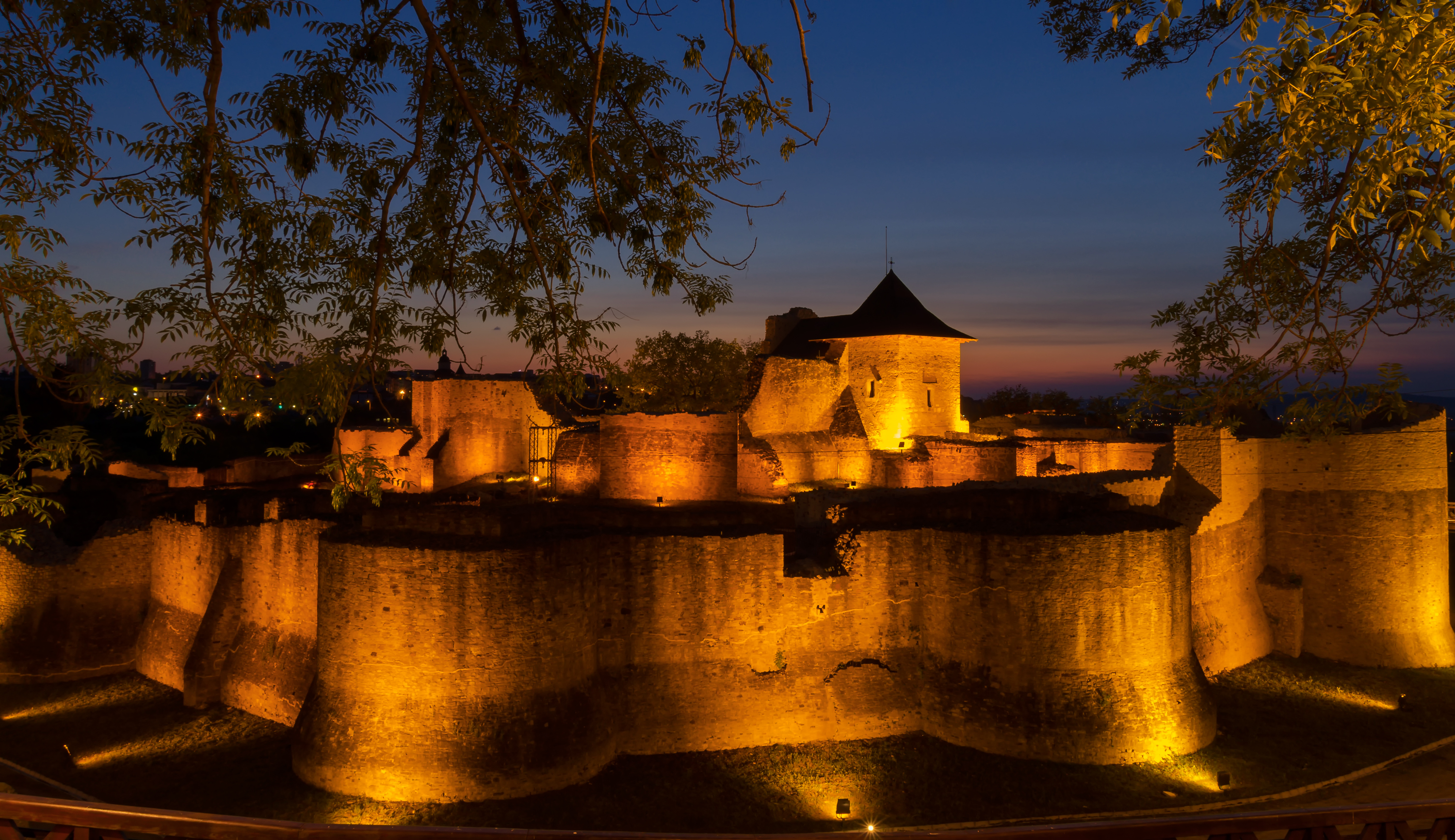
Medieval Seat Fortress of Suceava in Suceava (2015)

- Șcheia Fortress, Suceava
- Princely Fortress, Suceava
- Medieval Seat Fortress of Suceava, Suceava

== Crișana ==
Arad (22)

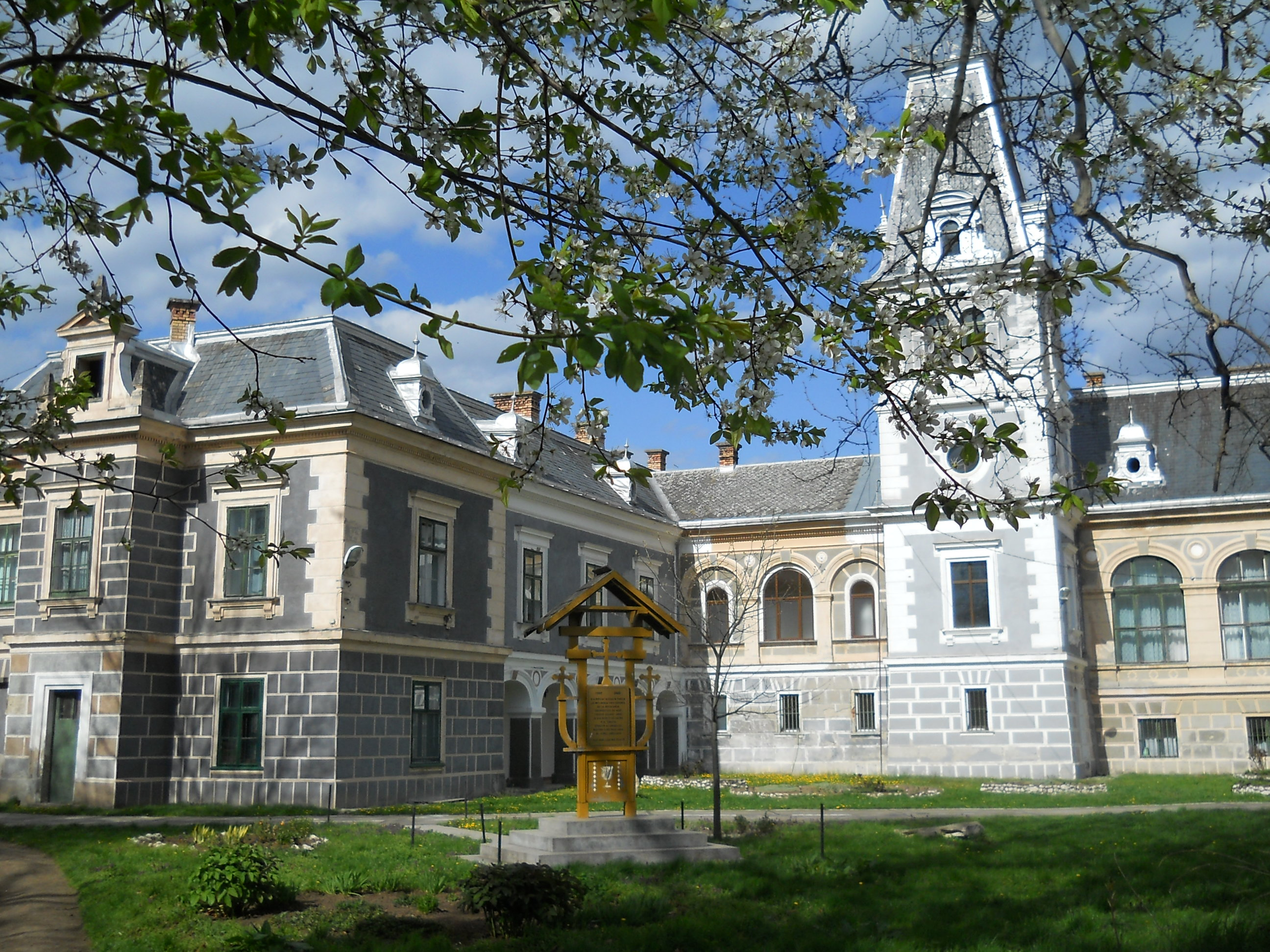
Csernovics (Macea)

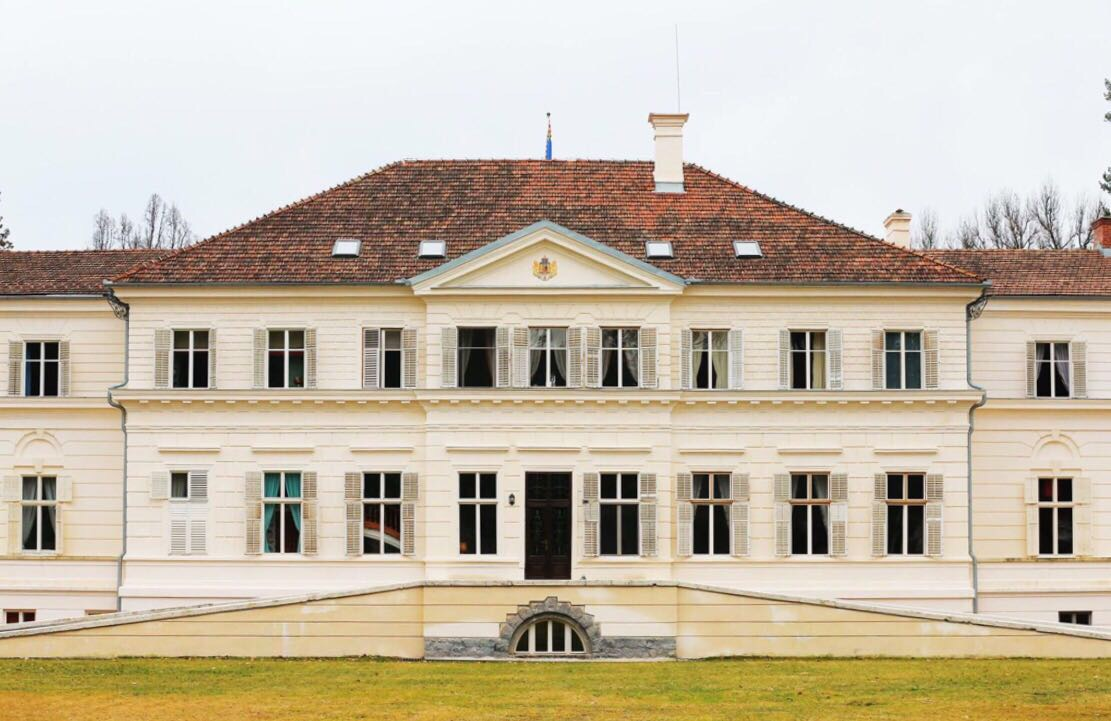
Royal Castle of Săvârșin

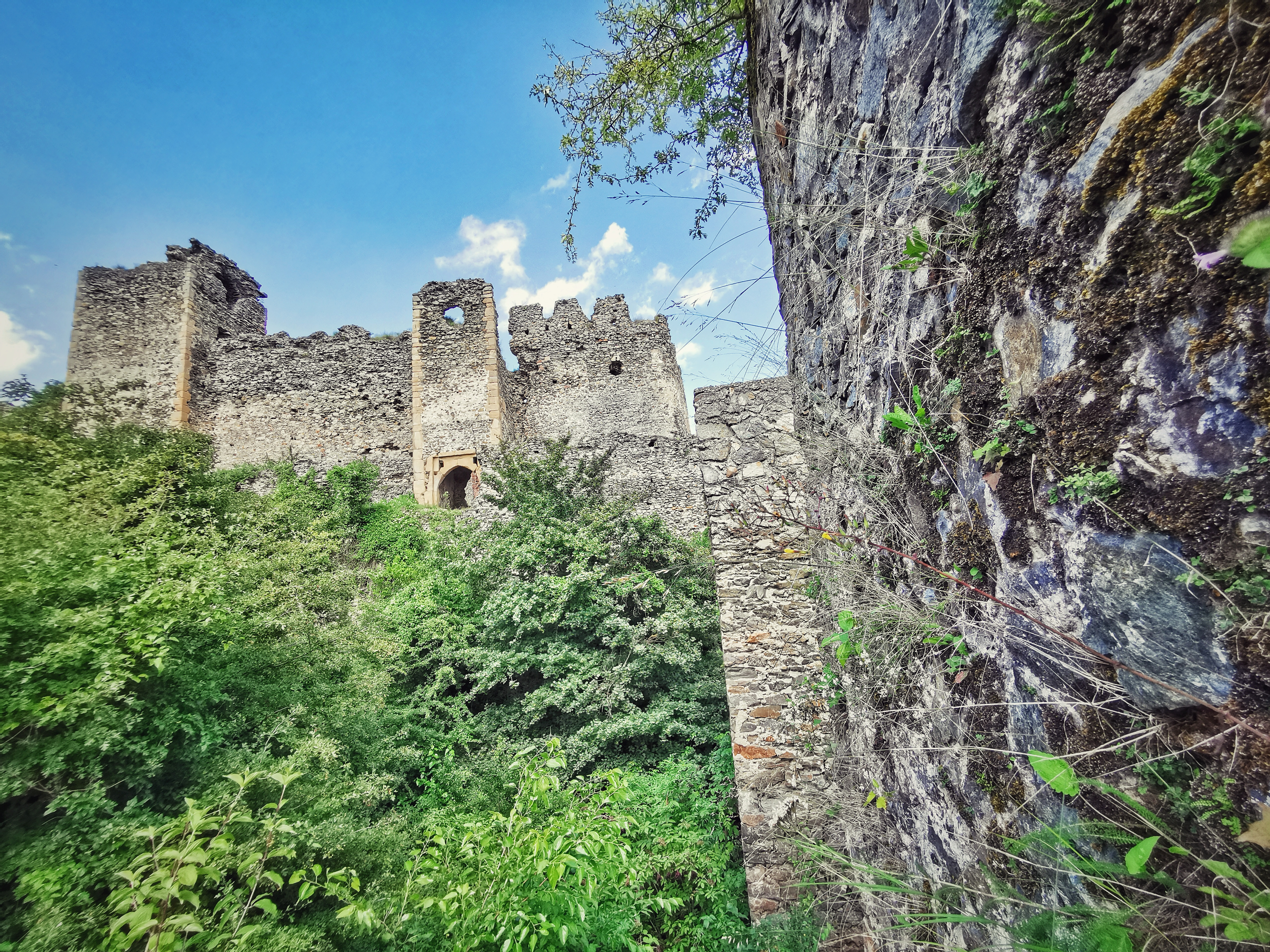
Șoimoș Fortress

- Agrișu Mare Fortress, Agrișu Mare
- Arad Fortress, Arad
- Bohus Castle, Șiria
- Csernovics Castle, Macea
- Dezna Fortress, Dezna
- Hălmagiu Fortress, Hălmagiu
- Hindec Fortress, Covăsânț
- Ineu Fortress, Ineu
- Konopi Castle, Odvoș
- Kövér-Appel Castle, Fântânele
- Mocsonyi Castle, Bulci
- Nopcsa Castle, Arad
- Purgly Castle, Șofronea
- Royal Castle, Săvârșin
- Salbek Castle, Petriș
- Șiria Fortress, Șiria
- Șoimoș Fortress, Șoimoș
- Solymosy Castle, Mocrea
- Tauț Fortress, Tauț
- Teleki Castle, Căpâlnaș
- Tornea Fortress, Covăsânț
- Turkish Fortress, Pâncota

Bihor (17)

- Adorján Fortress, Sălard
- Batthyány Castle, Aleșd
- Biharia Fortress, Biharia
- Castle-Former Premonstratensian Monastery, Sânmartin
- Csáky Castle, Marghita
- Degenfeld-Schonburg Castle, Balc
- Finiș Fortress, Finiș
- Hunting Castle of Poiana Florilor, Aleșd
- Kornis Fortress, Pomezeu
- Oradea Fortress, Oradea
- Piatra Șoimului Fortress, Peștiș
- Stubenberg Castle, Săcueni
- Thelegdy Castle, Tileagd
- Tholdy Castle, Sânnicolau Român
- Tisza Castle, Ghiorac
- Zichy Castle, Diosig
- Zichy Hunting Castle, Gheghie

== Dobruja ==
Constanța (3)

- Hisarlık Fortress, Cetatea
- Karaharman Fortress, Vadu
- Vicina Fortress, Ostrov

Tulcea (3)

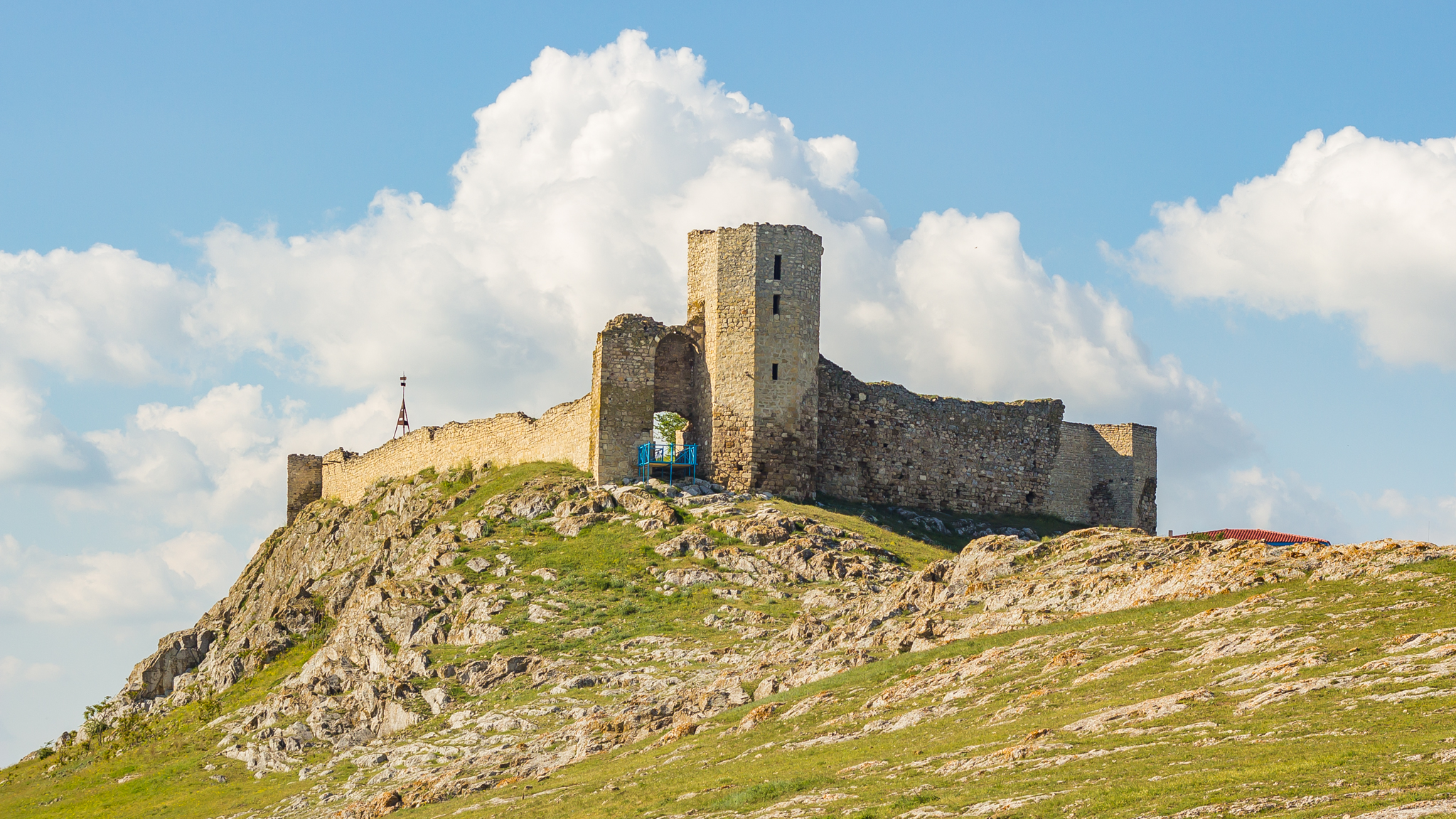
Enisala Fortress

- Enisala Fortress, Enisala
- Proslavița Fortress (Переяславецька фортеця), Nufăru
- Zaporozhians' Fortress, Dunavățu de Jos

== Maramureș ==
Maramureș (7)

- Apafi Castle, Coștiui
- Blomberg Castle, Gârdani
- Chioar Fortress (Kővár vára), Berchezoaia
- Seini Fortress, Seini
- Teleki Castle, Coltău
- Teleki Castle, Pribilești
- Teleki Castle, Satulung

Satu Mare (6)

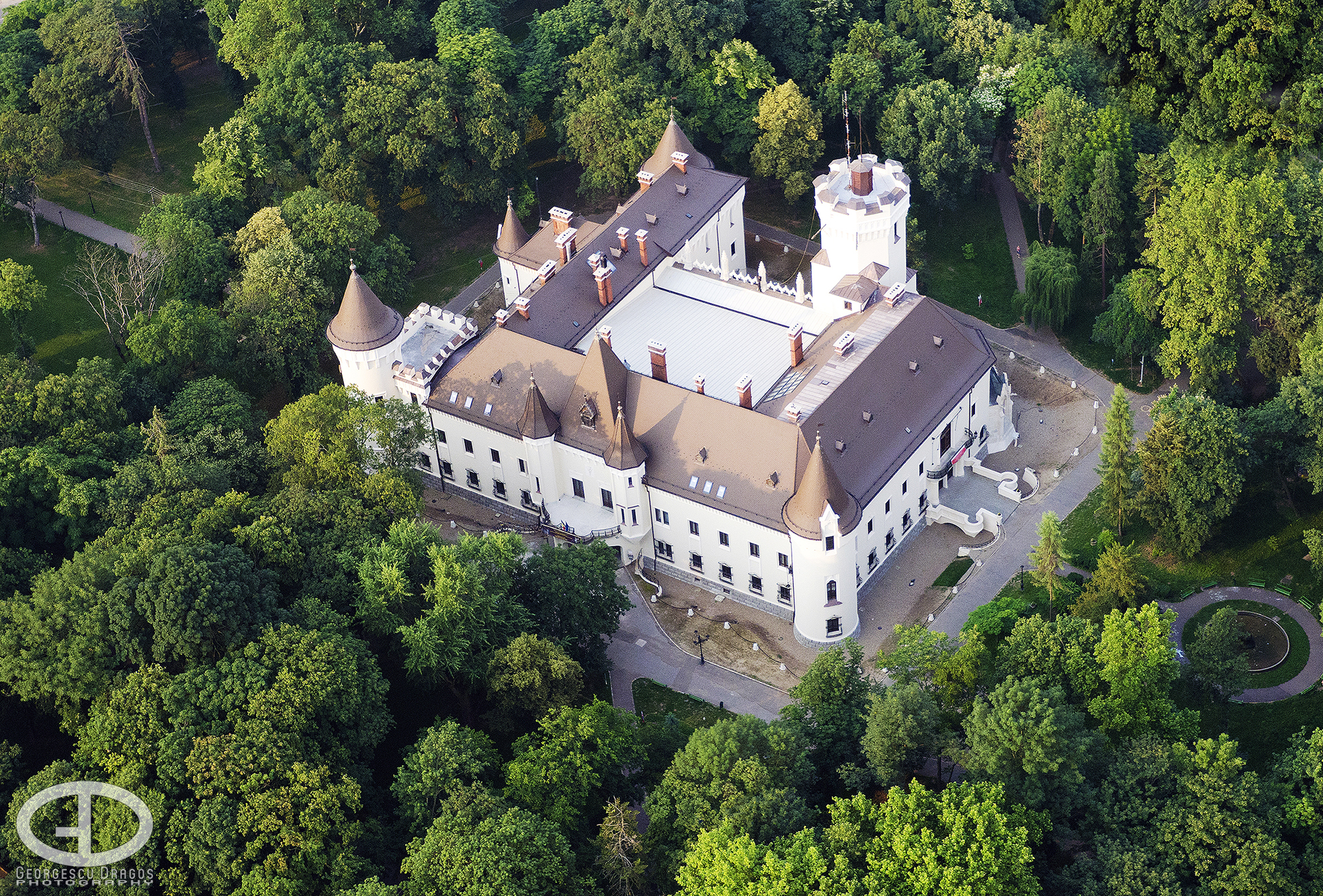
Károlyi (Carei)

- Cserey-Fischer Castle, Tășnad
- Károlyi Castle, Carei
- Károlyi Fortress, Ardud
- Lónyai Castle, Medieșu Aurit
- Perényi Castle, Turulung
- Vécsey Castle, Livada

== Moldavia ==
Bacău (2)

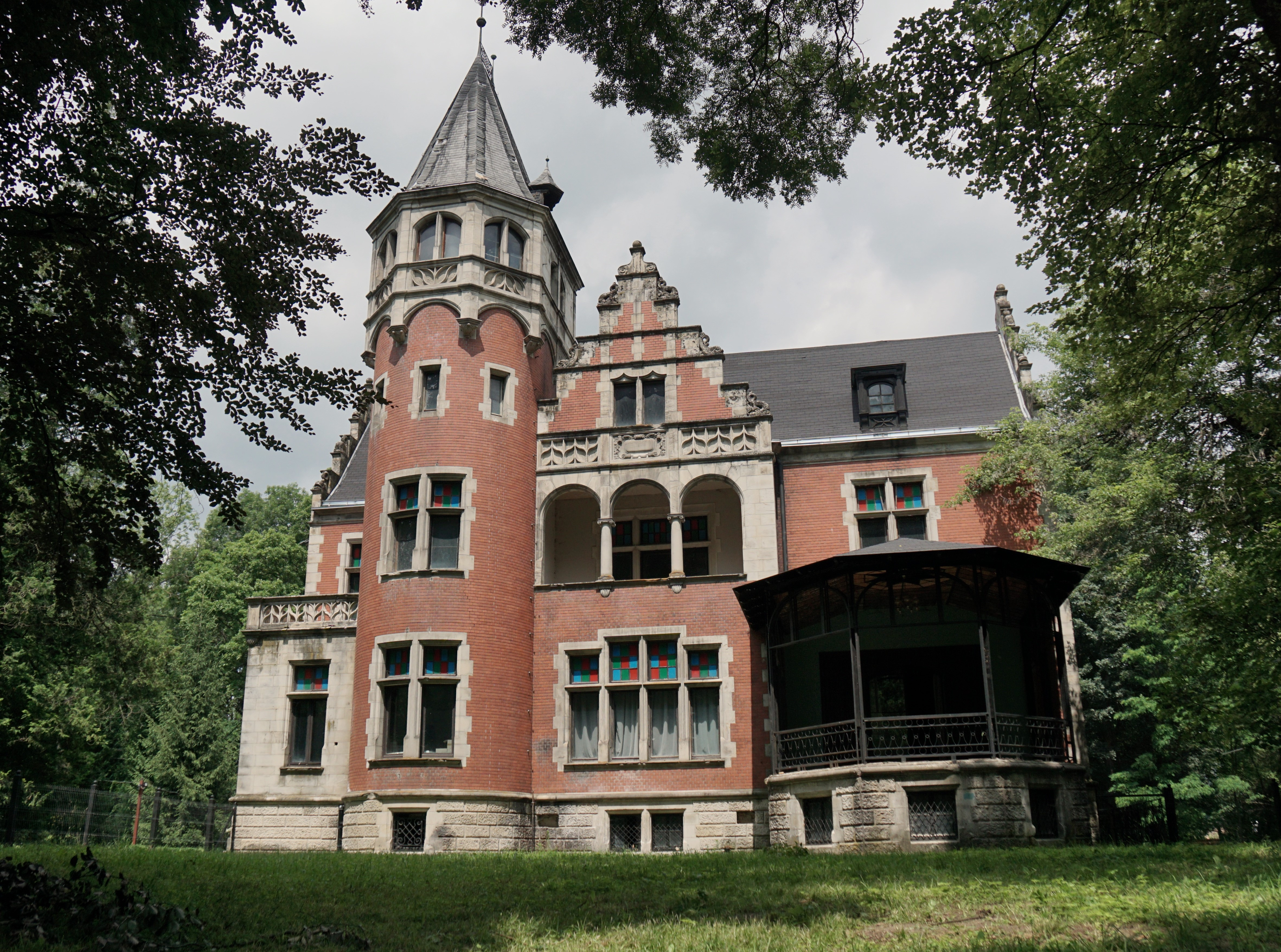
Ghika (Dofteana)

- Cantacuzino-Pașcanu-Waldenburg Castle, Lilieci
- Ghica Castle, Dofteana

Iași (1)

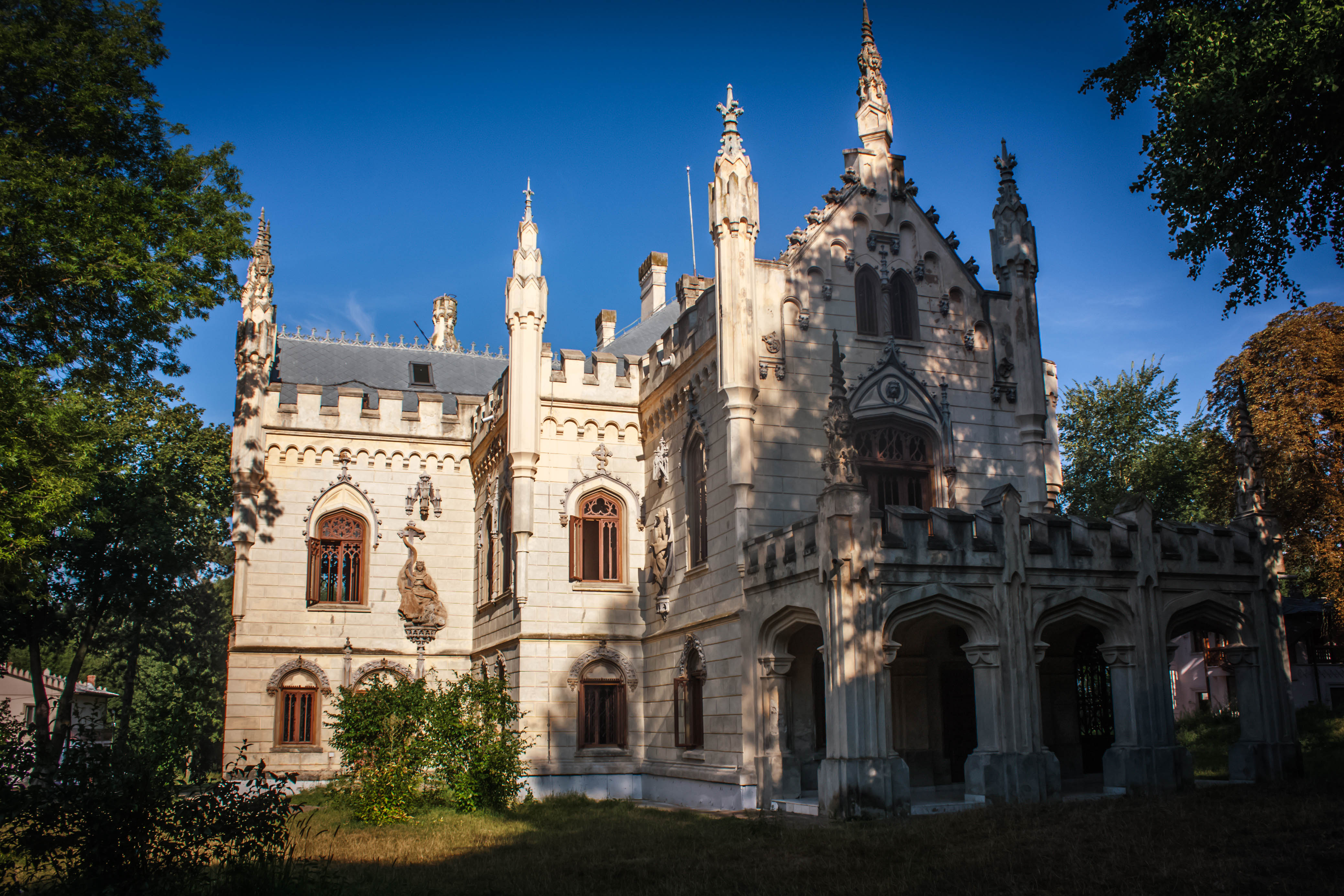
Sturdza (Miclăușeni)

- Sturdza Castle, Miclăușeni

Neamț (3)

- Mușat Fortress of Roman, Roman
- Neamț Fortress, Târgu Neamț
- New Fortress of Roman, Gâdinți

Vrancea (2)

- Crăciuna Fortress, Câmpineanca
- Sihleanu-Grădișteanu-Ghica Castle, Sihlea

== Muntenia ==
Argeș (2)

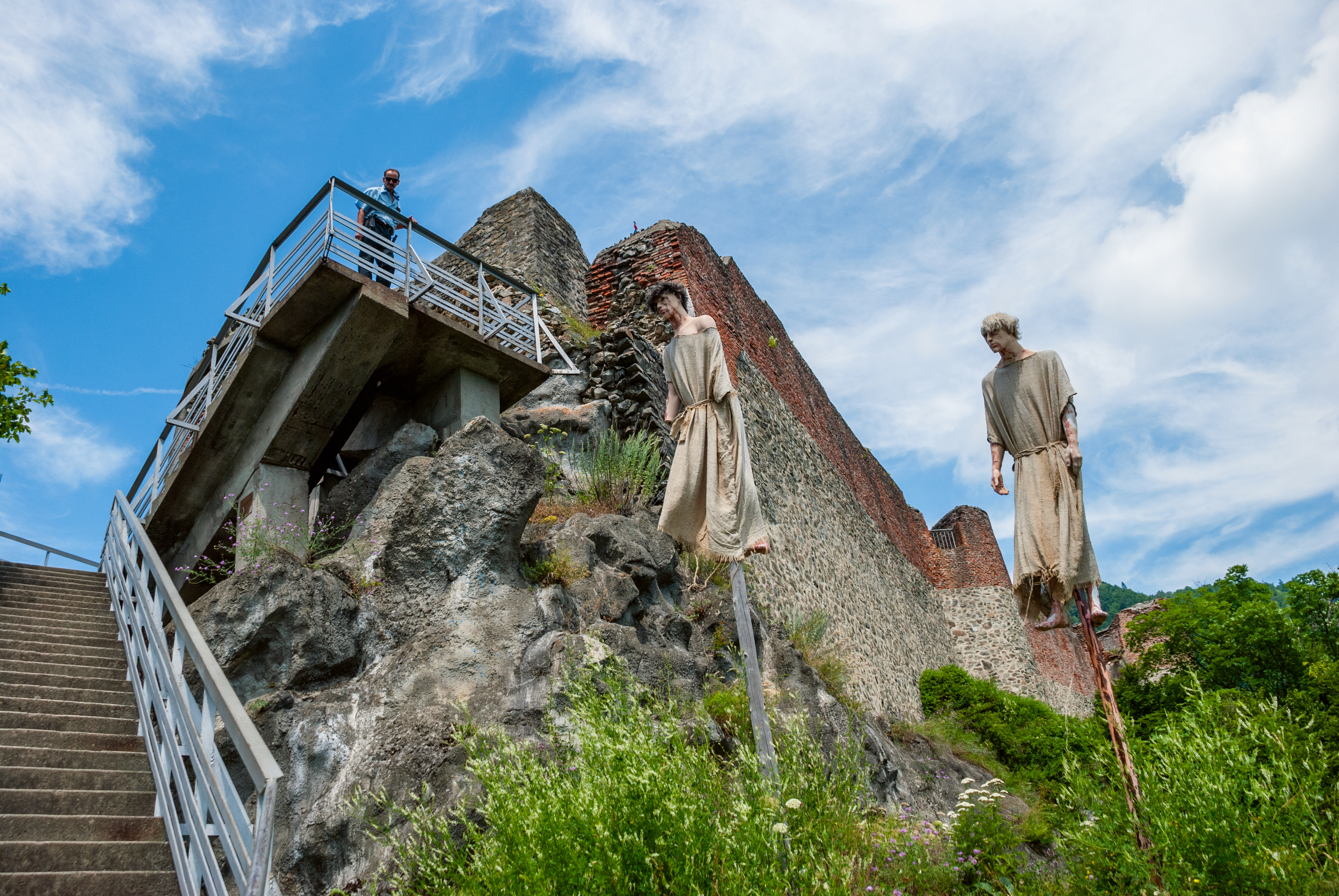
Poenari Fortress

- Oratea Fortress, Podu Dâmboviței
- Poenari Fortress, Căpățânenii Ungureni

Brăila (1)

- Brăila Fortress, Brăila

Dâmbovița (1)

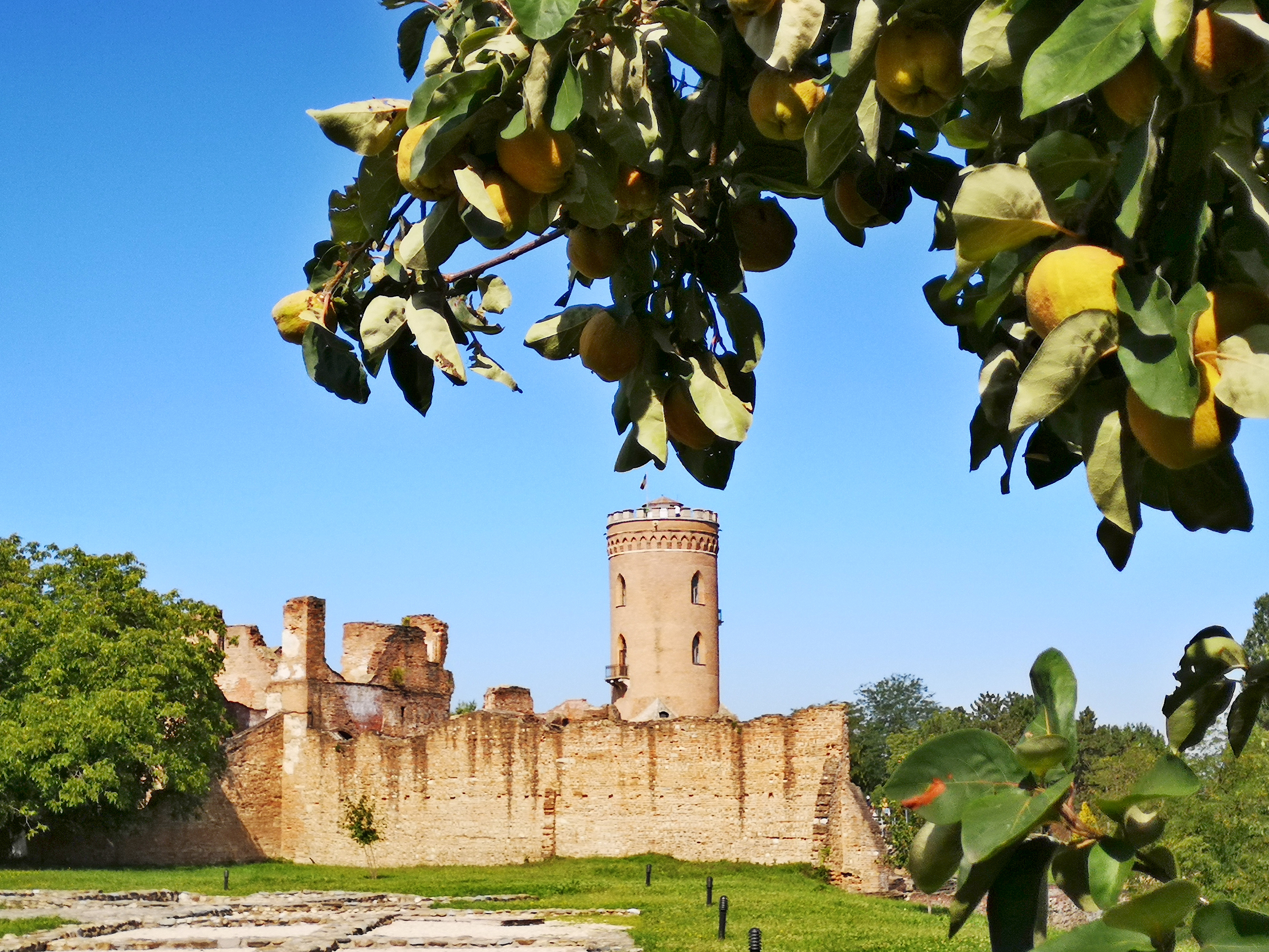
Târgoviște Fortress

- Târgoviște Fortress, Târgoviște

Giurgiu (1)

- Giurgiu Fortress, Giurgiu

Prahova (8)

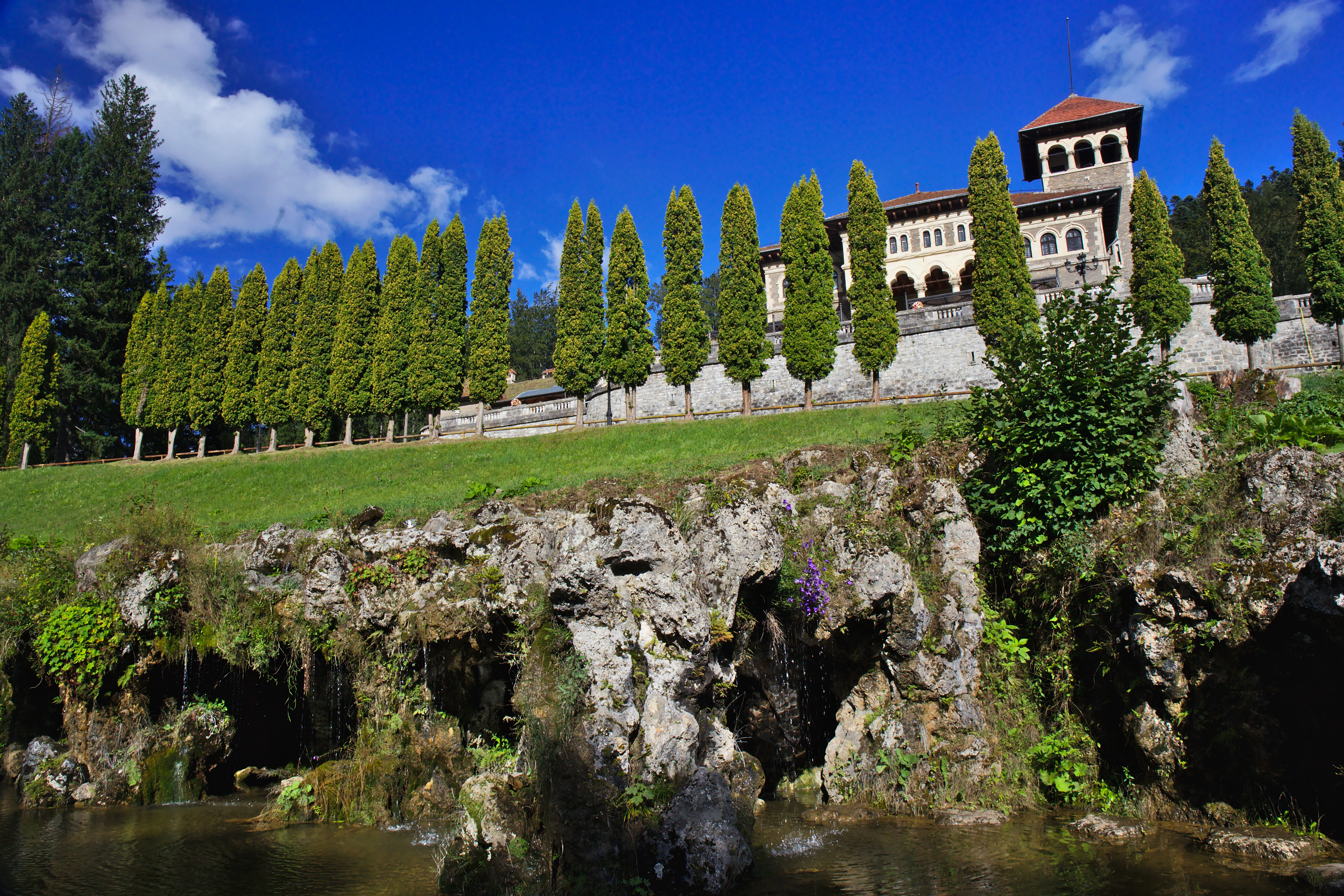
Cantacuzino (Bușteni)

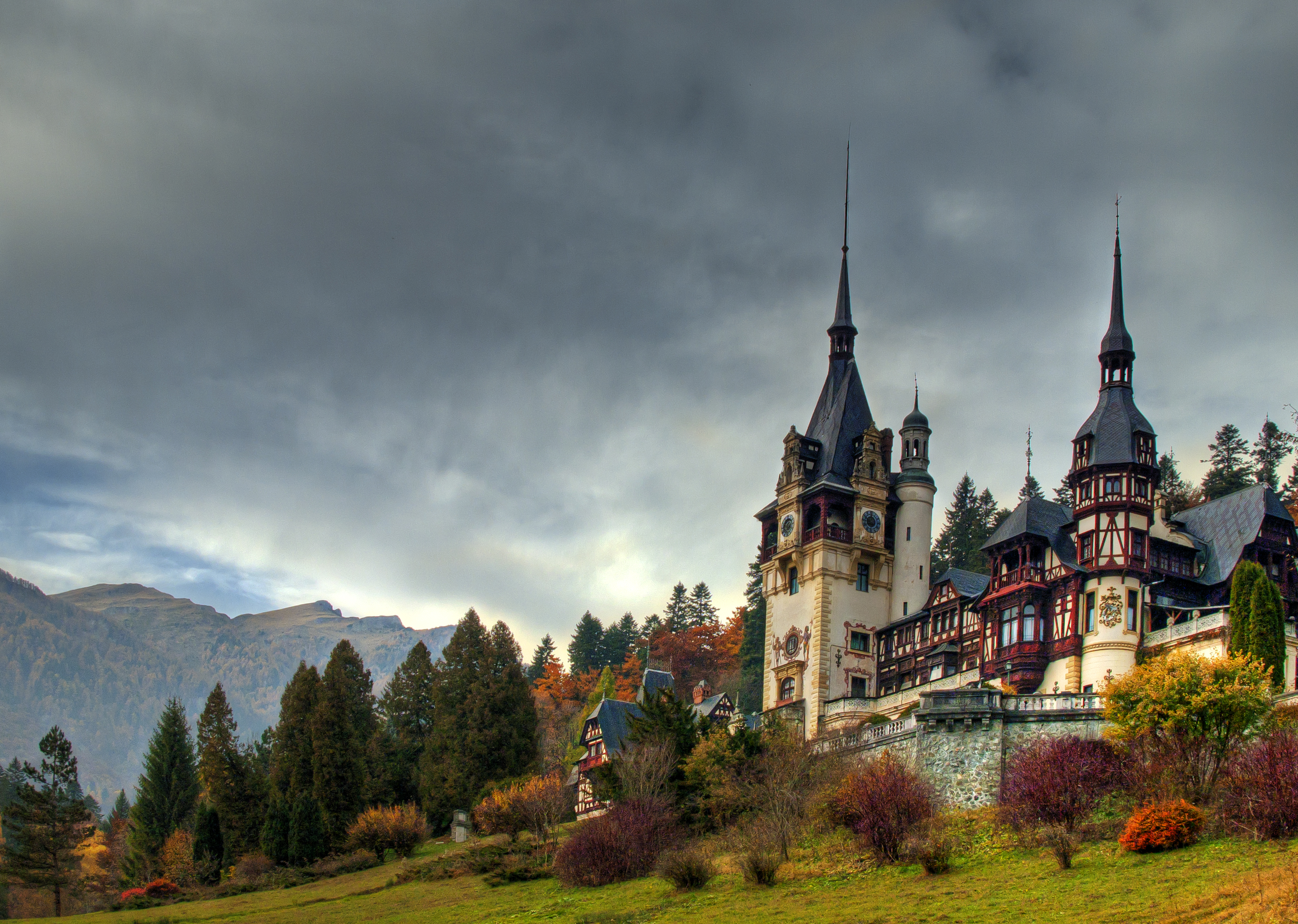
Peleș (Sinaia)

- Cantacuzino Castle, Bușteni
- Foișor Castle, Sinaia
- Iulia Hasdeu Castle, Câmpina
- Peleș Castle, Sinaia
- Pelișor Castle, Sinaia
- Posada (Bibescu) Castle, Comarnic
- Tabla Buții Fortress, Slon
- Văcărescu-Callimachi Castle, Mănești

Teleorman (2)

- Cossacks' Fortress, Roșiorii de Vede
- Turnu Fortress (Крепост Холъвник), Turnu Măgurele

== Oltenia ==
Administrative Palace, Craiova

Mehedinți (4)

- Ada Kaleh Fortress (Adakale), Șimian (ruin partially relocated to Șimian Island)
- Grădeț Fortress, Balotești
- Severin Fortress, Drobeta-Turnu Severin
- Trikule Fortress, Svinița

Vâlcea (1)

- Strassburg (Arxavia) Fortress, Câinenii Mari

== Transylvania ==
Alba (20)

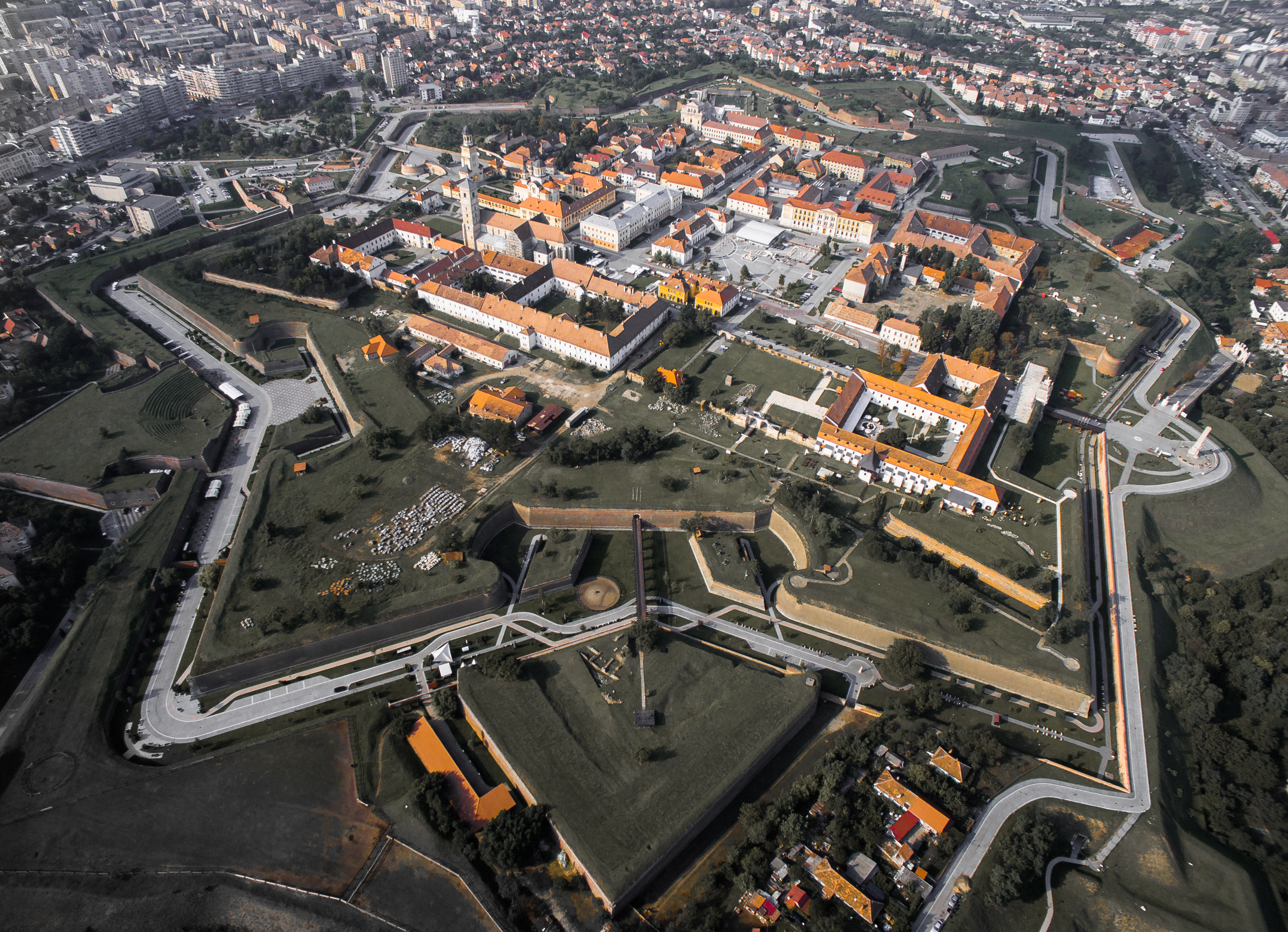
Alba Carolina Fortress

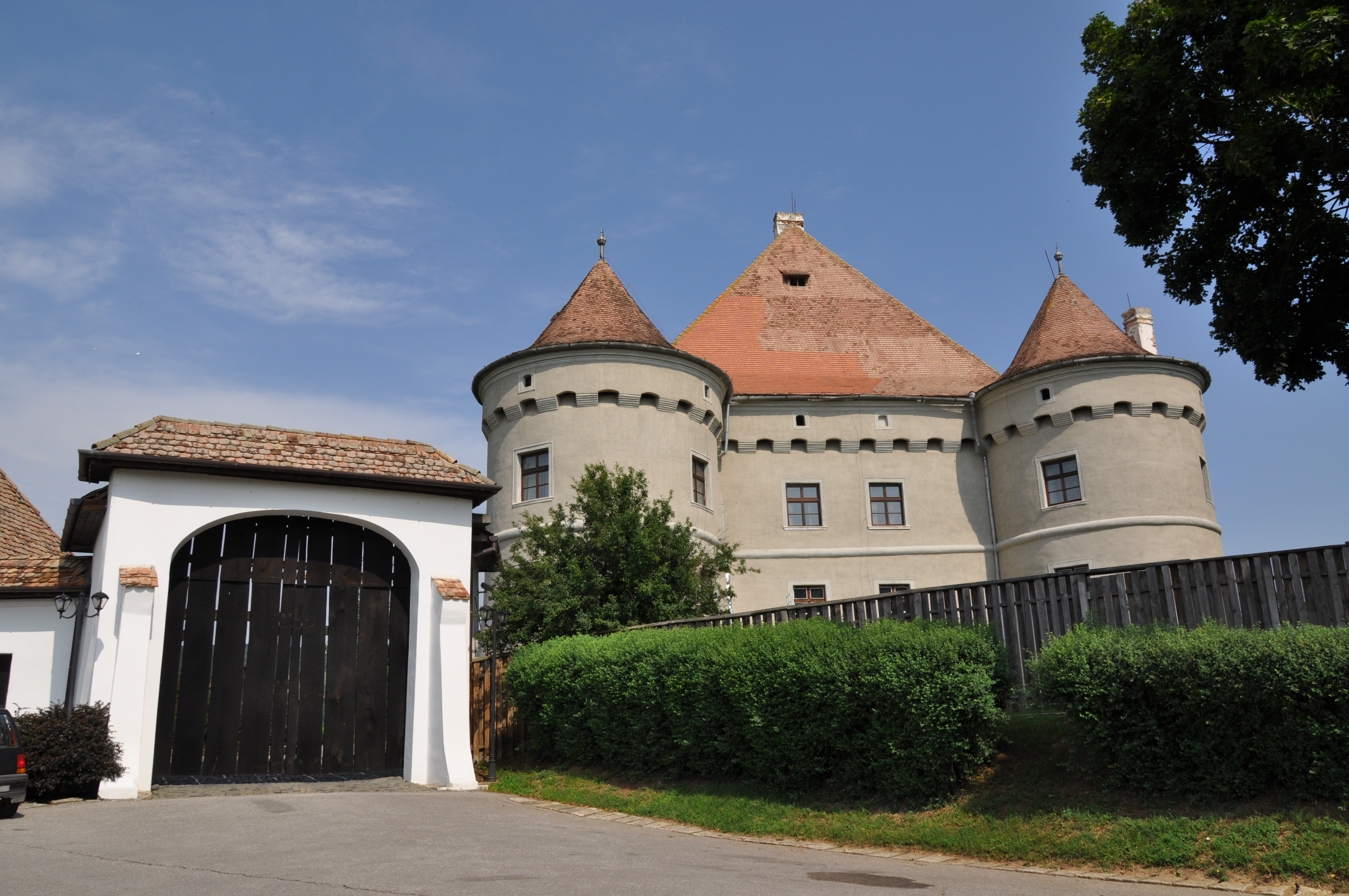
Bethlen-Haller (Cetatea de Baltă)

- Aiud Fortress, Aiud
- Alba Carolina Fortress, Alba Iulia
- Bánffy Castle, Sâncrai
- Bethlen Castle, Aiud
- Bethlen Castle, Sânmiclăuș
- Bethlen-Haller Castle, Cetatea de Baltă
- Colțești Fortress, Colțești
- Diód Fortress, Stremț
- Esterházy Castle, Șard
- Giants' Fortress, Gârbova
- Giants' Fortress, Glogoveț
- Gräven Fortress, Gârbova
- Martinuzzi Castle, Vințu de Jos
- Mikes Castle, Cisteiu de Mureș
- Peasants' Fortress (Bauernfestung Kelling), Câlnic
- Săsciori Fortress (Burg Schweis), Săsciori
- Tăuți Fortress, Tăuți
- Teleki Castle, Uioara de Sus
- Wesselényi Castle, Obreja
- Zebernic Fortress, Valea Vințului

Bistrița-Năsăud (16)

- András Bethlen Castle, Beclean
- Bánffy Castle, Urmeniș
- Bethlen Castle, Arcalia
- Bethlen Castle, Cristur-Șieu
- Bistrița Fortress, Bistrița
- Ciceu Fortress, Ciceu-Corabia
- Haller Castle, Matei
- Hye Castle, Ilișua
- Károly Castle, Dobric
- Lázár Castle, Sărata
- Pál Bethlen Castle, Beclean
- Rákóczi Castle, Șieu
- Teleki Castle, Comlod
- Teleki Castle, Posmuș
- Torma Castle, Cristeștii Ciceului
- Wesselényi Hunting Castle, Chiochiș

Brașov (20)

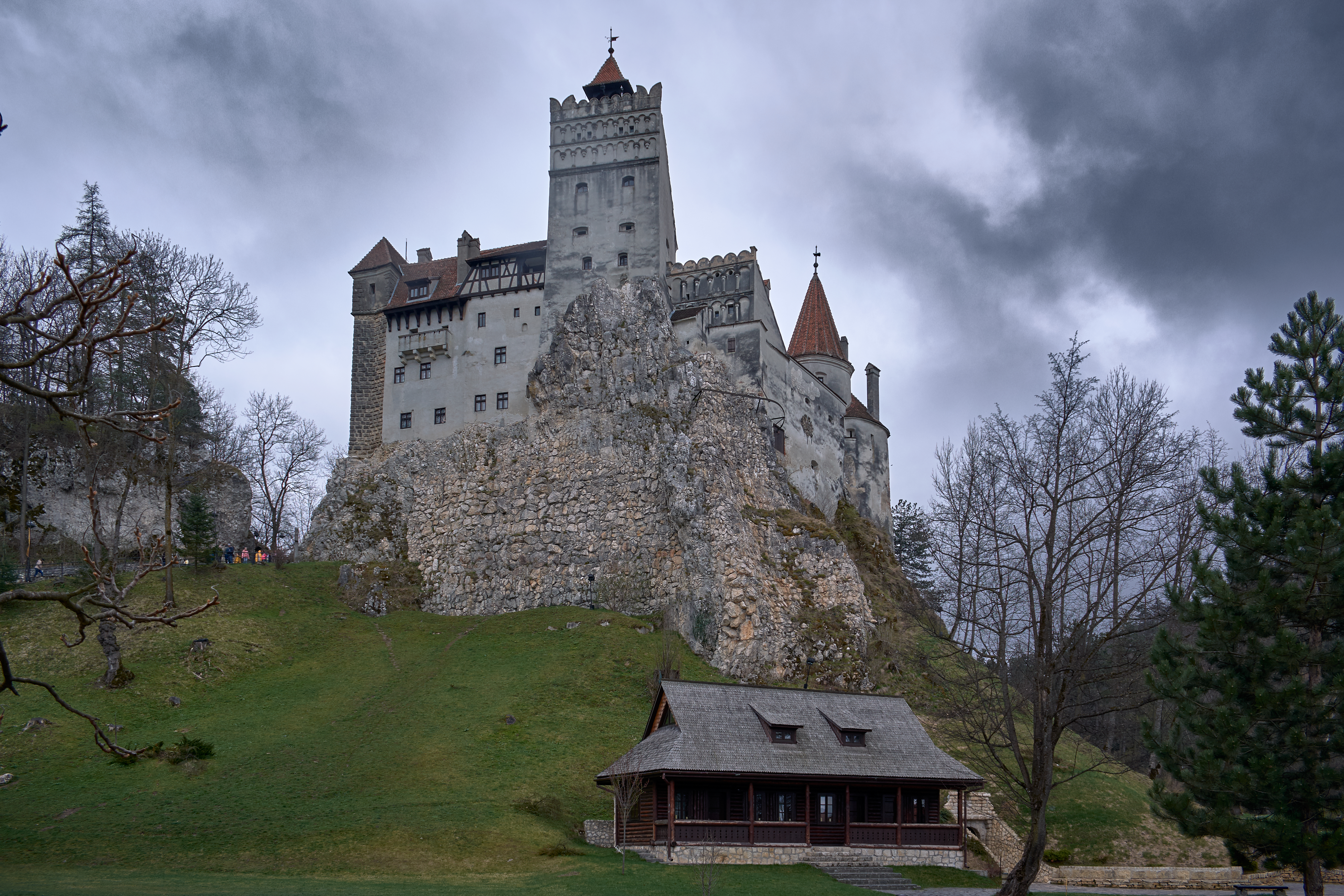
Bran Castle

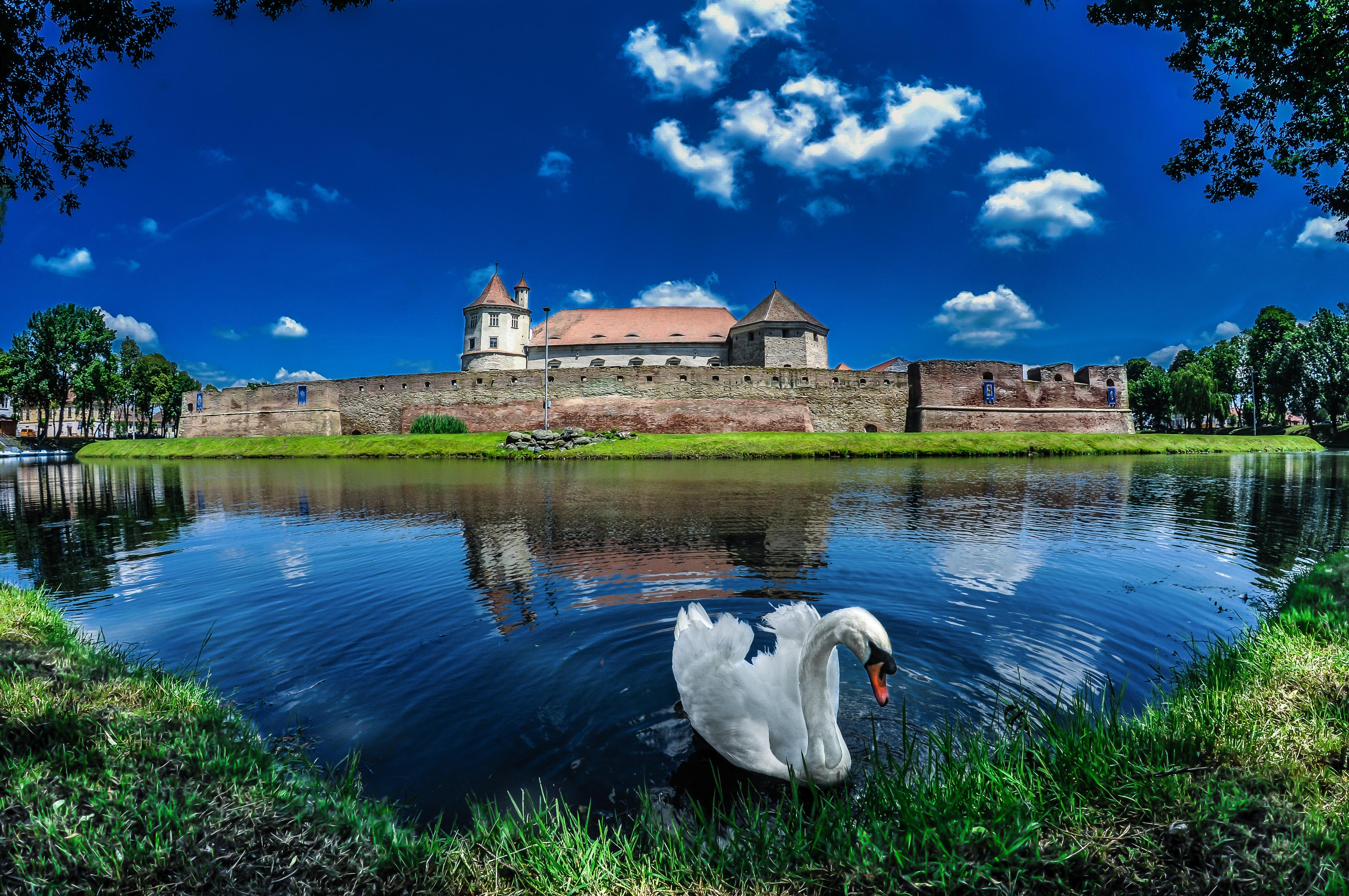
Făgăraș Castle

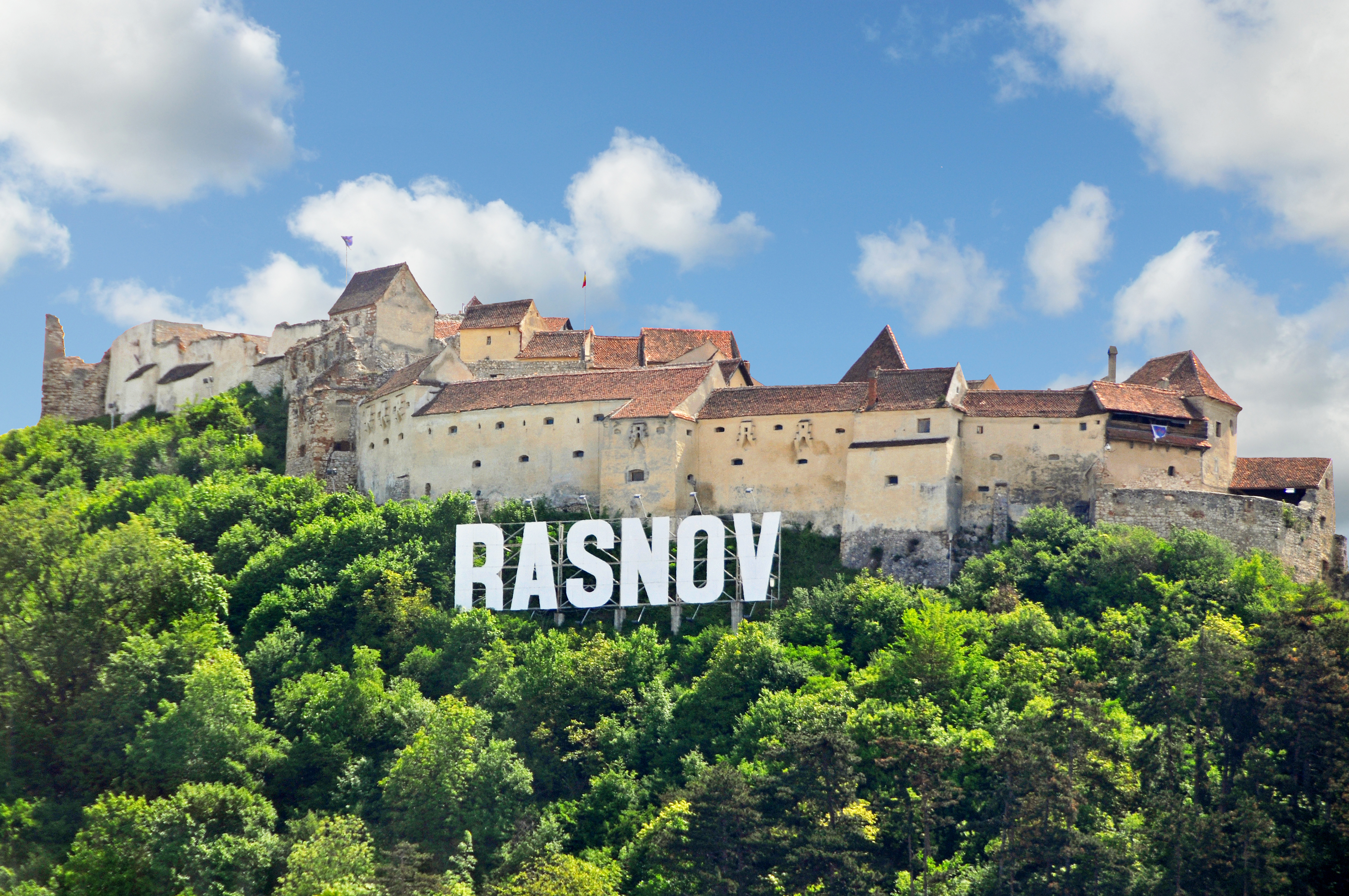
Râșnov Fortress

- László Béldi Castle, Budila
- Bran Castle (Törzburg), Bran
- Brâncoveanu Castle, Sâmbăta de Sus
- Brașov Fortress, Brașov
- Brukenthal Castle, Sâmbăta de Jos
- Făgăraș Castle, Făgăraș
- Feldioara Fortress (Marienburg), Feldioara
- Fortress on Strajă, Brașov
- Guthman-Valenta Castle, Hoghiz
- Haller Castle, Hoghiz
- Heldenburg Fortress, Crizbav
- Jimbor Fortress, Jimbor
- Kálnoky Castle, Hoghiz
- Mikes Castle, Budila
- Negru Vodă Fortress, Breaza
- Nemes Castle, Budila
- Pál Béldi Castle, Budila
- Râșnov Fortress (Burg Rosenau), Râșnov
- Rupea Fortress (Burg Reps), Rupea
- Sükösd-Bethlen Castle, Racoș

Cluj (25)

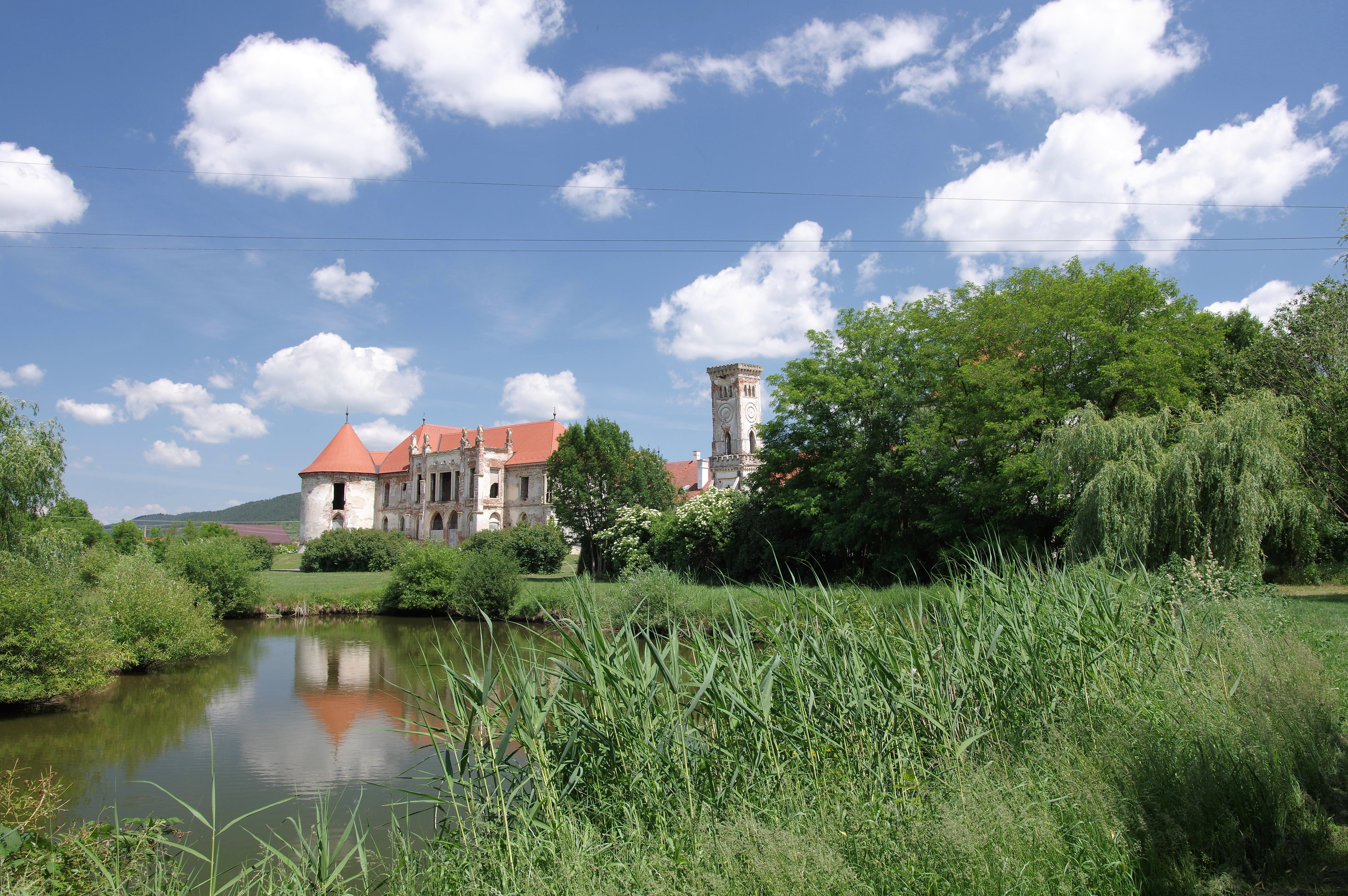
Bánffy (Bonțida)

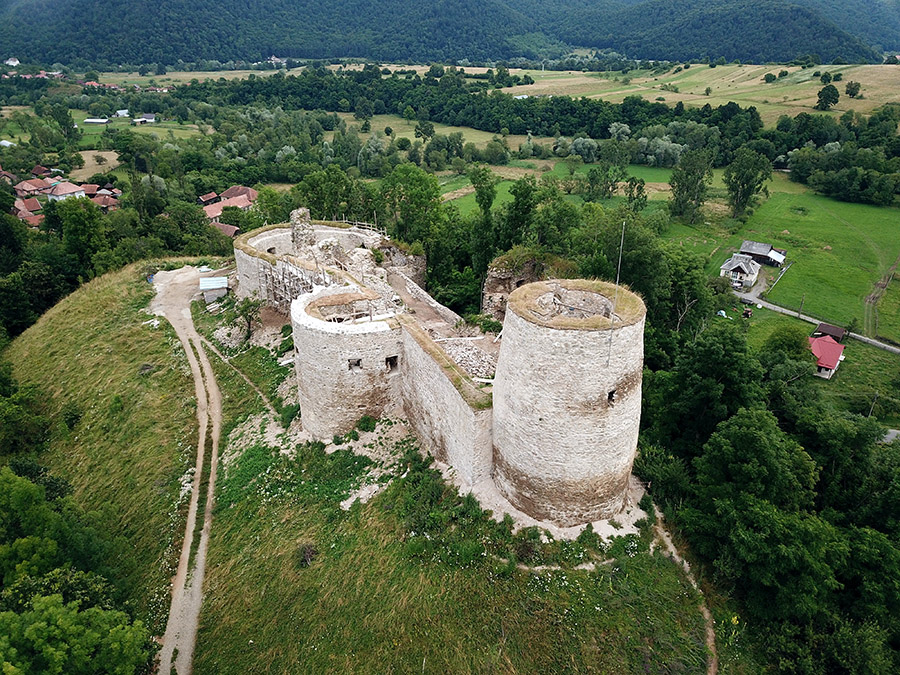
Bologa Fortress

- Bánffy Castle, Bonțida
- Bánffy Castle, Borșa
- Bánffy Castle, Răscruci
- Béldi Castle, Geaca
- Bocskai Castle, Aghireșu
- Bologa Fortress (Sebesvár), Bologa
- Dăbâca Fortress, Dăbâca
- Dej Fortress, Dej
- Géczy Fortress, Liteni
- Haller Castle, Coplean
- Jósika Castle, Moldovenești
- Kemény Castle, Luncani
- Kornis Castle, Mănăstirea
- Lita Fortress, Săcel
- Maiden's Fortress (Leányvár), Florești
- Maiden's Fortress, Mihai Viteazu
- Martinuzzi Fortress, Gherla
- Mikes Castle, Săvădisla
- Teleki Castle, Luna de Jos
- Turda Fortress, Turda
- Unguraș Fortress, Unguraș
- Veres Castle, Pruniș
- Wass Castle, Țaga
- Wass-Bánffy Castle, Gilău
- Wolves' Fortress (Farkasvár), Bicălatu

Covasna (24)

- Almaș Fortress, Lemnia
- Apor Castle, Turia
- Badger's Fortress (Borzvára), Boroșneu Mic
- Bálványos Fortress, Turia
- Béldi-Mikes Castle, Ozun
- Csuklyán Fortress, Lutoasa
- Dániel Castle, Tălișoara
- Dániel Castle, Vârghiș
- Falcons' Fortress, Bixad
- Ika Fortress, Cernat
- Kálnoky Castle, Micloșoara
- Kálnoky Castle, Valea Crișului
- Maiden's Fortress (Leánykavár), Olteni
- Mikes Castle, Zăbala
- Mikó Castle, Olteni
- Nemes Castle, Hăghig
- Rákóczi Fortress, Oituz
- Rika Fortress, Racoșu de Sus
- Sfântu Gheorghe Fortress, Sfântu Gheorghe
- Szentkereszty Castle, Arcuș
- Thury-Bányai Castle, Tamașfalău
- Tiborc Fortress, Biborțeni
- Turia Fortress (Torjávara), Turia
- Vápa Fortress, Bixad

Harghita (17)

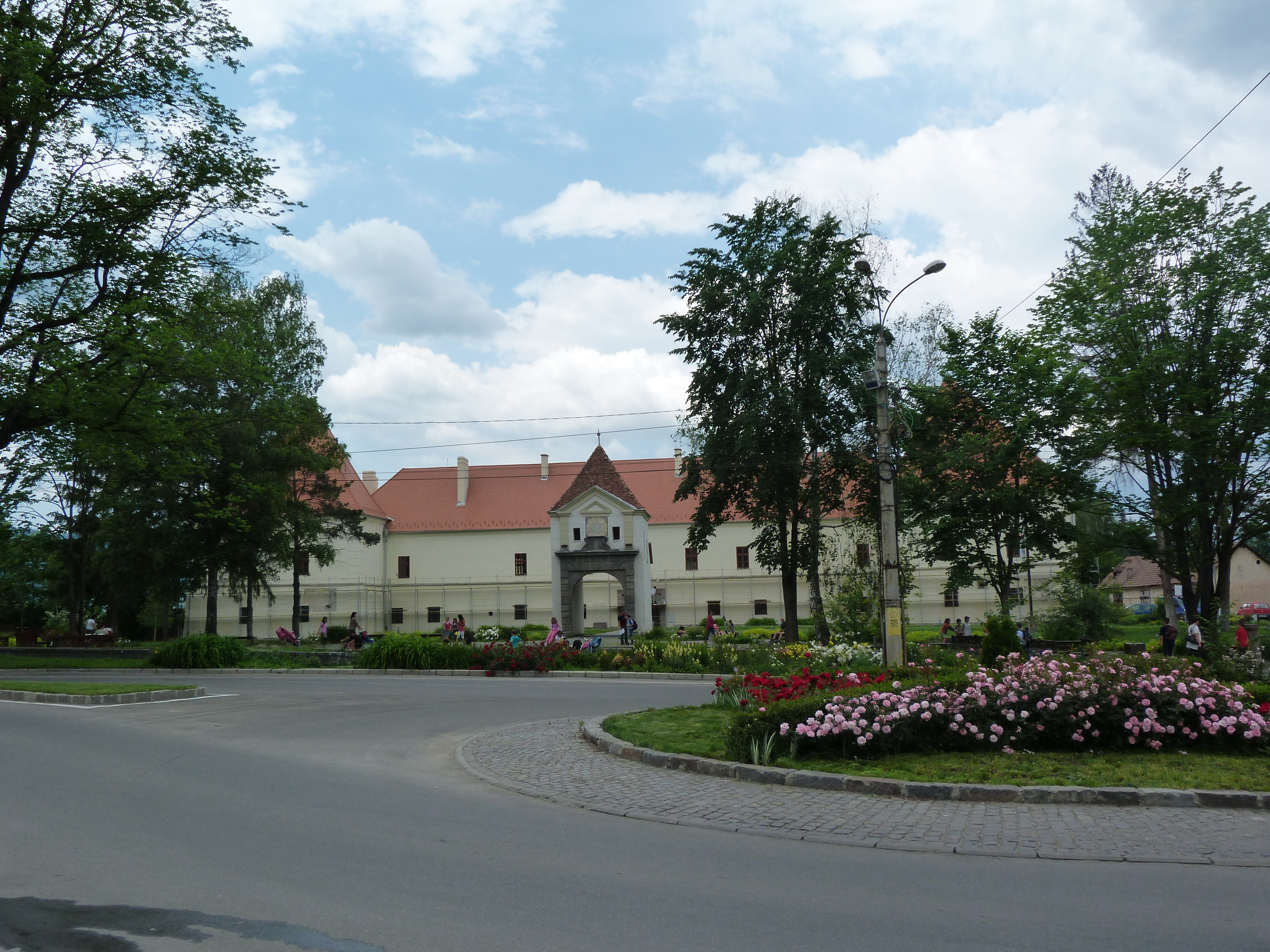
Mikó Fortress

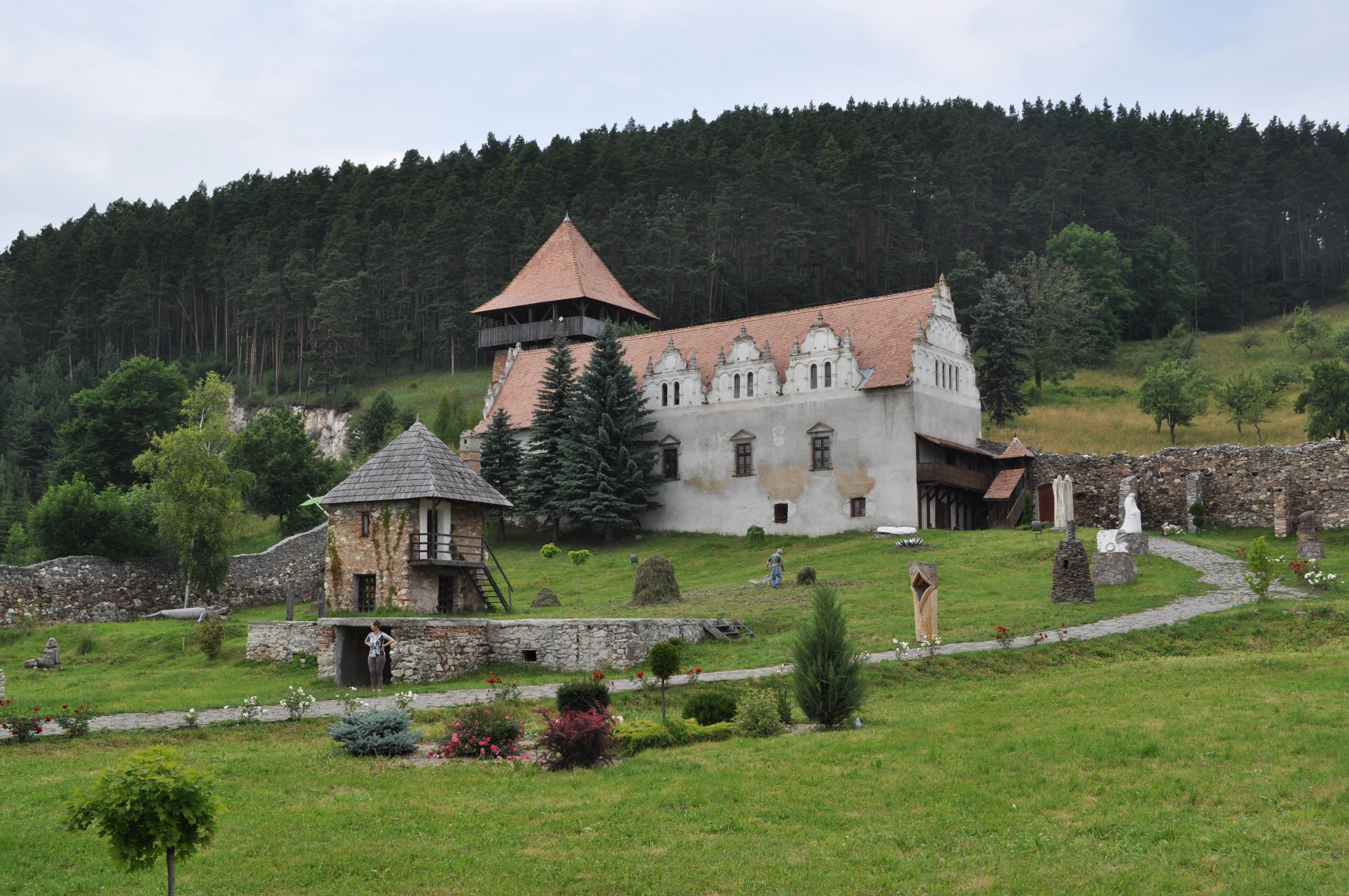
Lázár (Lăzarea)

- Bágy Fortress, Bădeni
- Bothvár Fortress, Gheorgheni
- Budvár Fortress, Odorheiu Secuiesc
- Ciceu Fortress, Ciceu
- Firtos Fortress, Corund
- Harom Fortress, Miercurea Ciuc
- Kustaly Fortress, Ocland
- Lázár Castle, Lăzarea
- Little Fortress (Kisvár), Miercurea Ciuc
- Mikó Fortress, Miercurea Ciuc
- Pagans' Fortress (Pogányvár), Racu
- Poppy's Fortress (Mákvára), Dealu
- Rapsóné Fortress, Praid
- Salt Fortress (Sóvár), Miercurea Ciuc
- Székelytámadt Fortress, Odorheiu Secuiesc
- Tartód Fortress, Vărșag
- Tușnad Fortress, Tușnad

Hunedoara (17)

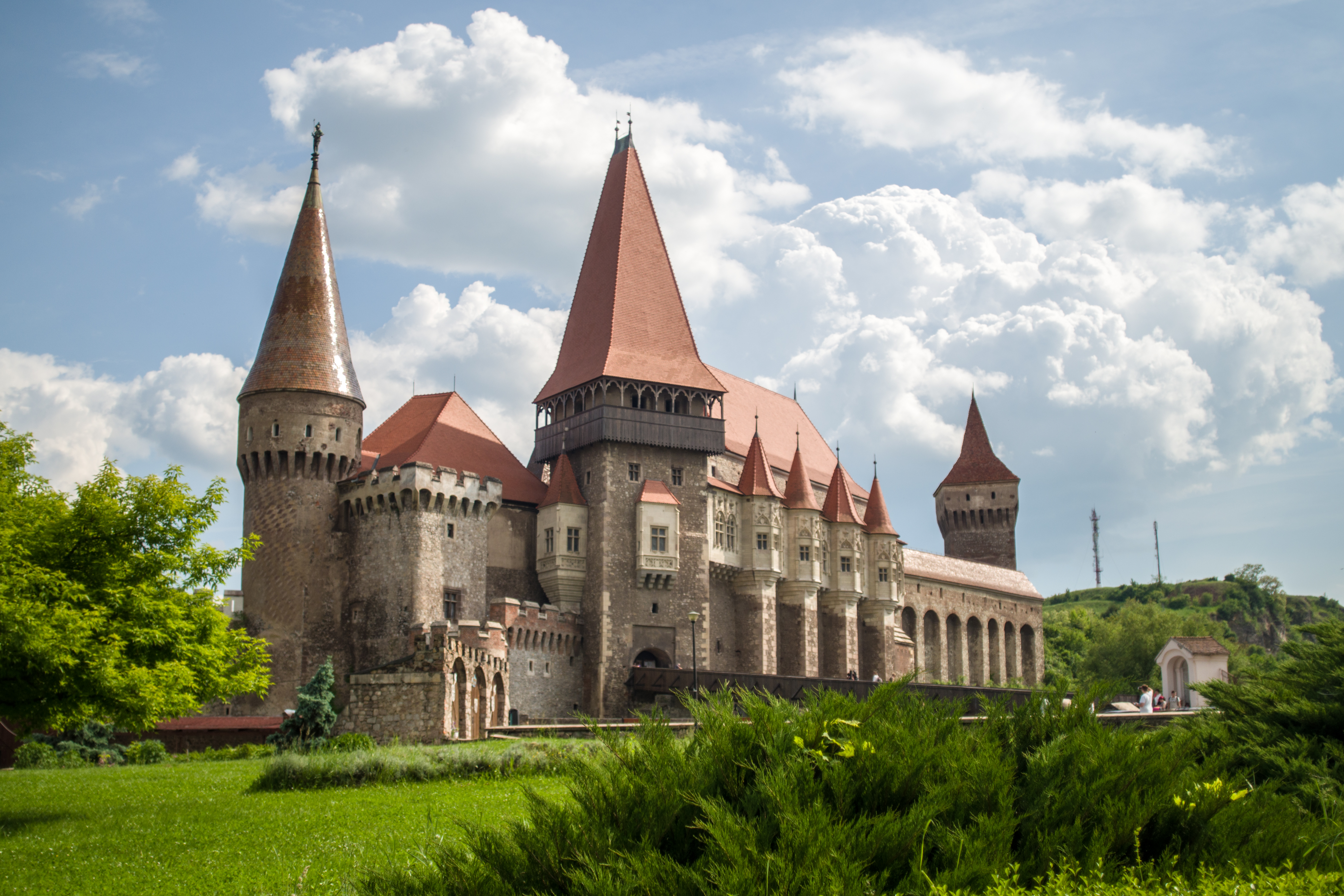
Corvin (Hunedoara)

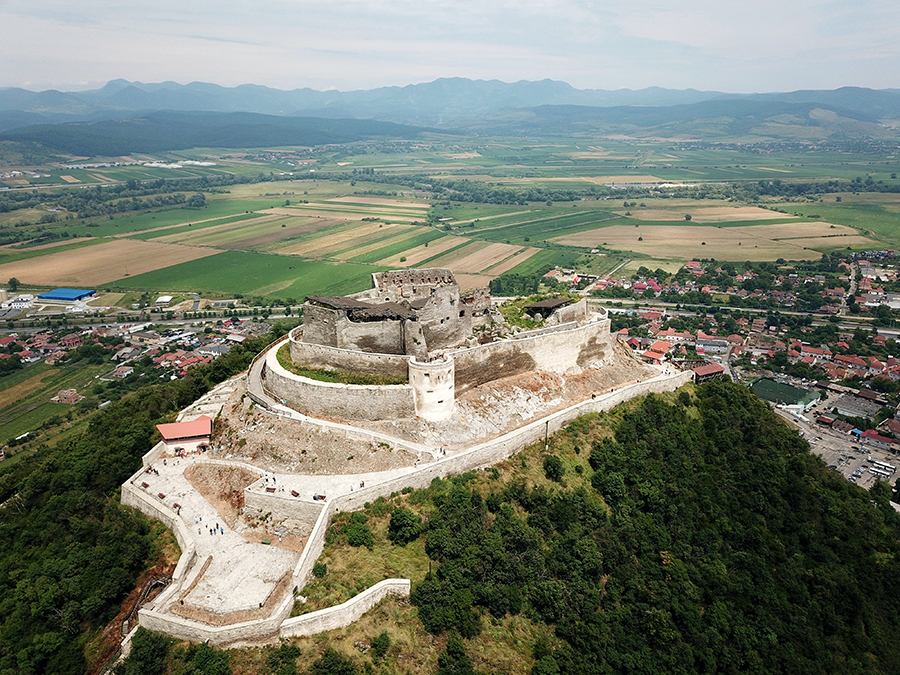
Deva Fortress

- Bethlen Castle, Deva
- Corvin Castle, Hunedoara
- Deva Fortress, Deva
- Fáy Castle, Simeria
- Gyulay Castle, Mintia
- Jósika Castle, Brănișca
- Kendeffy Castle, Sântămăria-Orlea
- Knezial Fortress of the Kendeffys, Suseni
- Mălăiești Fortress, Mălăiești
- Naláczy-Fáy Castle, Nălațvad
- Nopcsa Castle, Săcel
- Nopcsa Castle, Zam
- Orăștie Fortress (Burg Broos), Orăștie
- Pogány Castle, Păclișa
- Răchitova Fortress, Răchitova
- Royal Fortress of Hațeg, Subcetate
- Veres Castle, Bobâlna

Mureș (33)

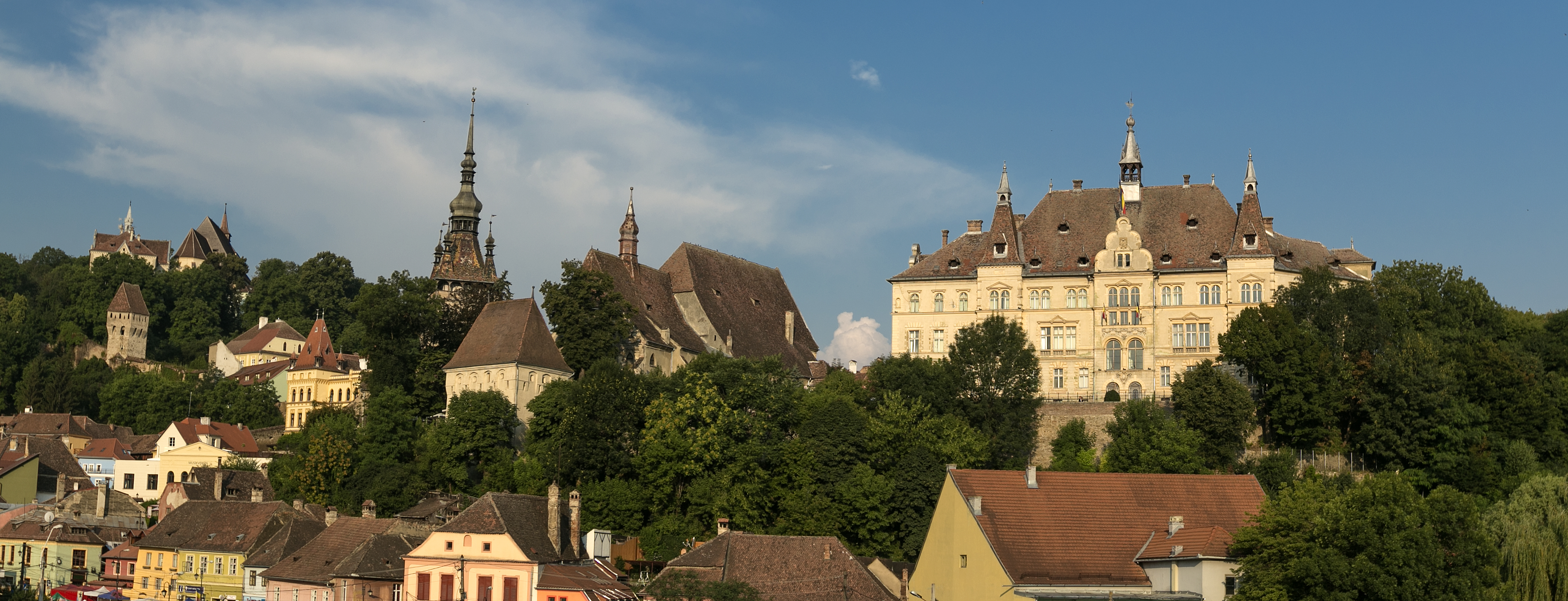
Sighișoara Fortress

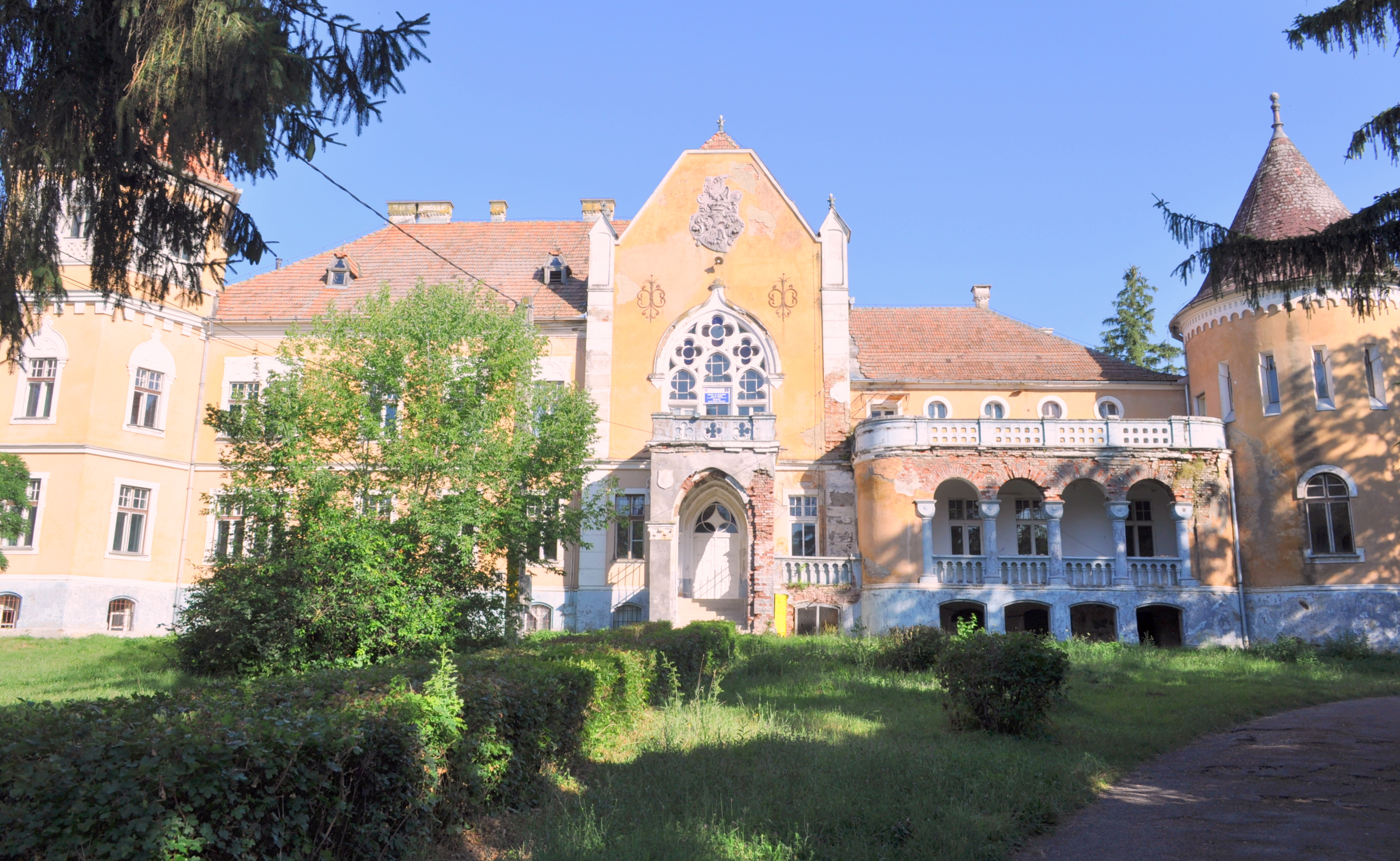
Ugron (Zau de Câmpie)

- Apor Castle, Abuș
- Bánffy Castle, Gheja
- Bethlen Castle, Bahnea
- Bethlen Castle, Boiu
- Bethlen Castle, Criș
- Bethlen Castle, Mădăraș
- Bethlen Castle, Țopa
- Bornemisza Castle, Gurghiu
- Csombod Fortress, Sărățeni
- Degenfeld Castle, Cuci
- Gurghiu Fortress, Gurghiu
- Haller Castle, Mihai Viteazu
- Haller Castle, Ogra
- Haller Castle, Sânpaul
- Huszár Castle, Apalina
- Kacsó Fortress, Măgherani
- Kendi-Kemény Castle, Brâncovenești
- Kornis-Rákóczi-Bethlen Castle, Iernut
- Maka Fortress, Ghindari
- Máriaffi Castle, Sângeorgiu de Mureș
- Peasants' Fortress (Hünenburg), Saschiz
- Pekri Castle, Ozd
- Rhédey Castle, Sângeorgiu de Pădure
- Rhédey-Rothental Castle, Seuca
- Royal Hunting Castle, Lăpușna
- Sighișoara Fortress (Schässburg), Sighișoara
- Somsics Castle, Chendu
- Târgu Mureș Fortress, Târgu Mureș
- Teleki Castle, Dumbrăvioara
- Teleki Castle, Gornești
- Tholdalagi Castle, Corunca
- Ugron Castle, Zau de Câmpie
- Vityál Fortress, Eremitu

Sălaj (13)

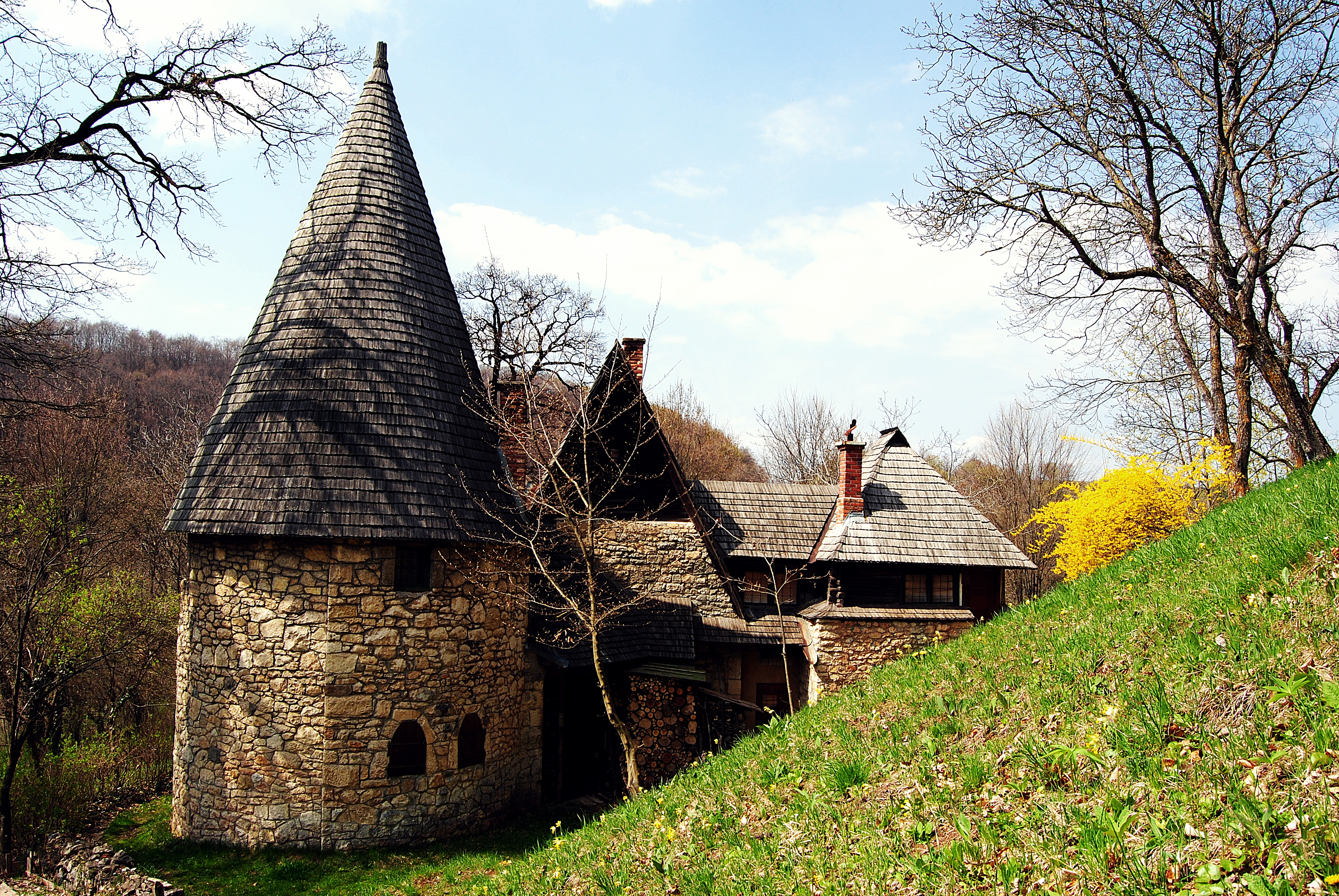
Crow's Fortress

- Aranyos Fortress, Cheud
- Bánffy Castle, Nușfalău
- Báthory Fortress, Șimleu Silvaniei
- Béldi Castle, Jibou
- Bethlen Castle, Dragu
- Crow's Fortress (Várjuvár), Stana
- Csáky Castle, Almașu
- Dezső Fortress, Almașu
- Haller Castle, Gârbou
- Jósika Castle, Surduc
- Thököly Fortress, Cehu Silvaniei
- Valcău Fortress, Subcetate
- Wesselényi Castle, Jibou

Sibiu (11)

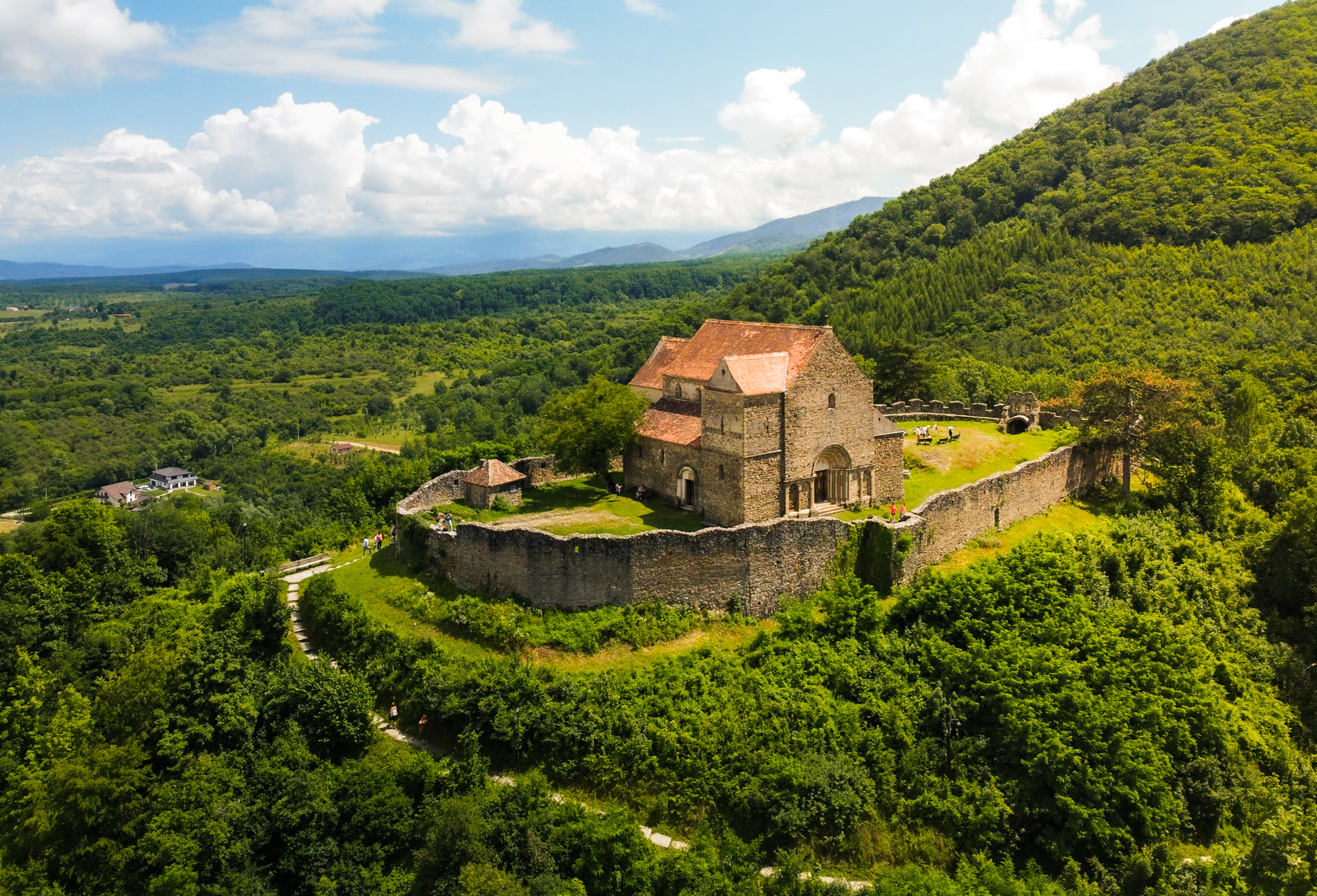
Cisnădioara Fortress

- Apafi Castle, Dumbrăveni
- Bolyai Castle, Buia
- Brukenthal Castle, Avrig
- Brukenthal Castle, Micăsasa
- Cisnădioara Fortress (Burg Michelsberg), Cisnădioara
- Salgo Fortress, Sibiel
- Sibiu Fortress, Sibiu
- Slimnic Fortress (Stolzenburg), Slimnic
- Tilișca Fortress, Tilișca
- Tobias Castle, Boarta
- Turnu Roșu Castle, Boița

== See also ==
- List of castles
- List of fortications in Wallachia
- Villages with fortified churches in Transylvania

== Additional reading ==
- Ion, Narcis Dorin (2001). Castele, palate și conace din România. Editura Fundației Culturale Române. ISBN 973-577-320-1.
