= List of fortifications in Wallachia =

This is a list of forts in Wallachia, southern Romania.

== Stone citadels ==
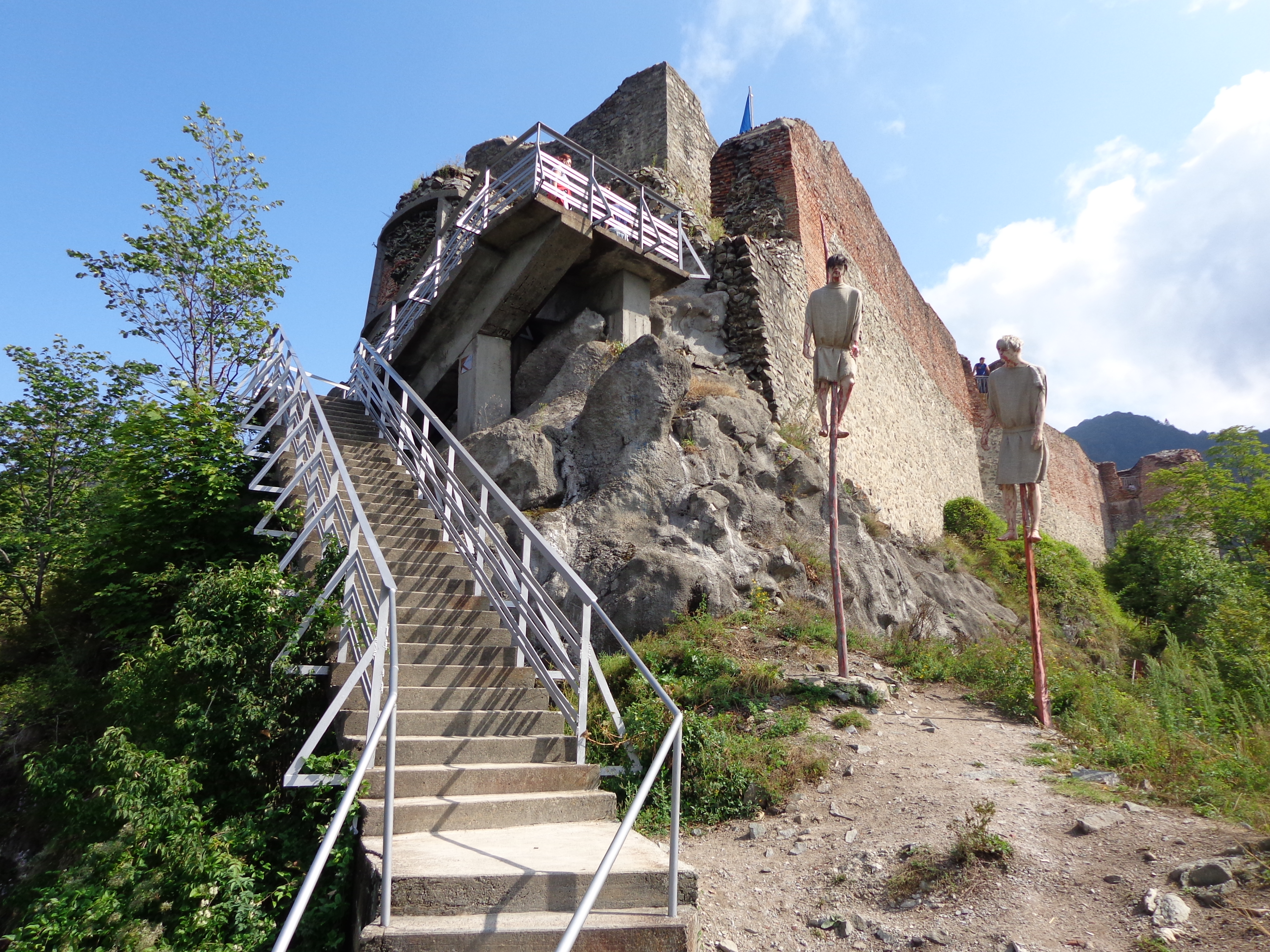
Poenari Citadel, often advertised as "Dracula's Castle"

| Name | County | Built |
|---|---|---|
| Grădeț | Mehedinți | 13th–14th centuries |
| Severin | Mehedinți | 1233 |
| Poenari | Argeș | 14th century |
| Tabla Buții | Prahova | 1211–1225 |
| Oratia | Argeș | 1212 |
| Negru Vodă (Cetățeni) | Argeș | 5th century BC (old Geto-Dacian citadel) |
| Giurgiu | Giurgiu | 1380–1390 |
| Turnu | Teleorman | 14th century |
| Vicina (Păcuiul lui Soare) | Constanța | 972–976 |

== Earthen citadels ==
| Name | County | Built |
|---|---|---|
| Frumoasa | Teleorman | 14th century |
| Crăciuna | Vrancea | 13th–14th centuries |
| Cerven (Roșiorii de Vede) | Teleorman | 13th–14th centuries |

== Fortified royal courts ==
- Câmpulung
- Curtea de Argeș
- Târgoviște
- Bucharest

== Fortified villages ==
- Coconi
- Basarabi
- Rușii de Vede

== See also ==
- List of fortified churches in Transylvania
- List of castles in Romania
