= Mikó Castle =

Coordinates: 46°21′22″N 25°48′10″E

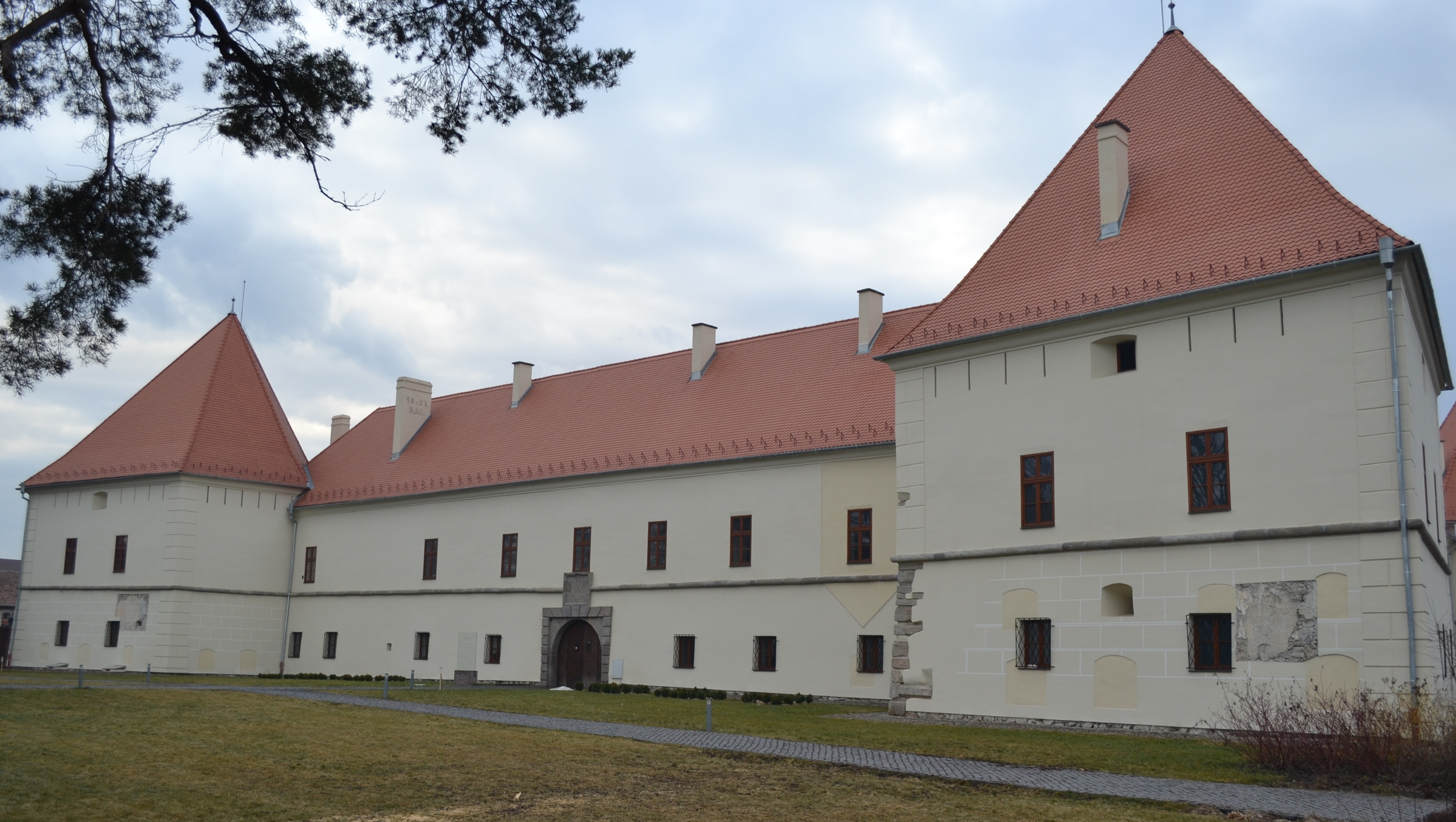
Mikó Castle

The Mikó Castle (Romanian: Castelul Mikó; Hungarian: Mikó-vár) is a fortified castle in Miercurea Ciuc (Csíkszereda), Romania. It is among the city's most important monuments, and today houses an ethnographic museum devoted to Székely heritage.

Work on the castle, which is 75 m long and 70 m wide, began on 26 April 1623 and probably was completed in the 1630s. In style, it resembles the castles at Iernut, Vințu de Jos and Lăzarea. It is named after Ferenc Mikó (1585–1635), who began building it a decade after becoming supreme captain of the Csíkszék (Ciuc), Gyergyószék (Gheorgheni) and Kászonszék (Caşin) Székely seats, later merged into Csík County. Documents of the time also refer to it as "Mikó's new citadel".

The first written document to mention the citadel dates to 1631. After Ferenc Mikó's heirs died prematurely, the citadel came into the possession of Tamás Damokos, supreme judge of Csíkszék. On 21 October 1661, Turkish and Tatar troops led by Ali, Ottoman pasha of Temeşvar Province, invaded Csíkszereda, occupying and burning the citadel. It was rebuilt in 1714-16 under orders from Habsburg General Stephan Steinville, as attested by a stone inscription above the entrance gate.

In 1735, the Austrian engineer and colonel Johann Conrad Weiss drew up the castle's plan. This is the oldest surviving plan of the building, and has been important to those studying both its history and the stages of its construction. For the rebuilt citadel, the Austrians designed a defensive system involving four Italian-style bastions, remnants of which are still visible on the south side. On the southwest side, they built a gunpowder depot, while converting the south bastion into a chapel. The chapel ceiling is decorated in modest stucco, following a late-Baroque design. The Gothic window frames were placed later on. The ground-floor rooms have dome-shaped cylindrical ceilings with groin vaults. Above the window sills there are tall, narrow, rectangular embrasures. The fortified castle played an important defensive role at the eastern border of the Habsburg Empire.

Through the mid-20th century, the building was used by the troops of various armies. In particular, it served as a barracks for Habsburg troops until 1764. From 1764 to 1848 it was the residence of the commander of the 1st Székely Regiment of the Transylvanian Military Frontier, part of the Military Frontier. During the Transylvanian Revolution of 1848, part of the Revolutions of 1848 in the Habsburg areas, it served as the headquarters of Sándor Gál, commander of the Székely revolutionary forces. In 1970, following a thorough restoration, the Ciuc Szekler Museum, established in 1930, moved into the castle. Additionally, part of the Kájoni János County Library, including a rare documents collection, has operated in the castle since 1978. The building is classified as a historic monument by the Ministry of Culture and Religious Affairs.

== Gallery ==
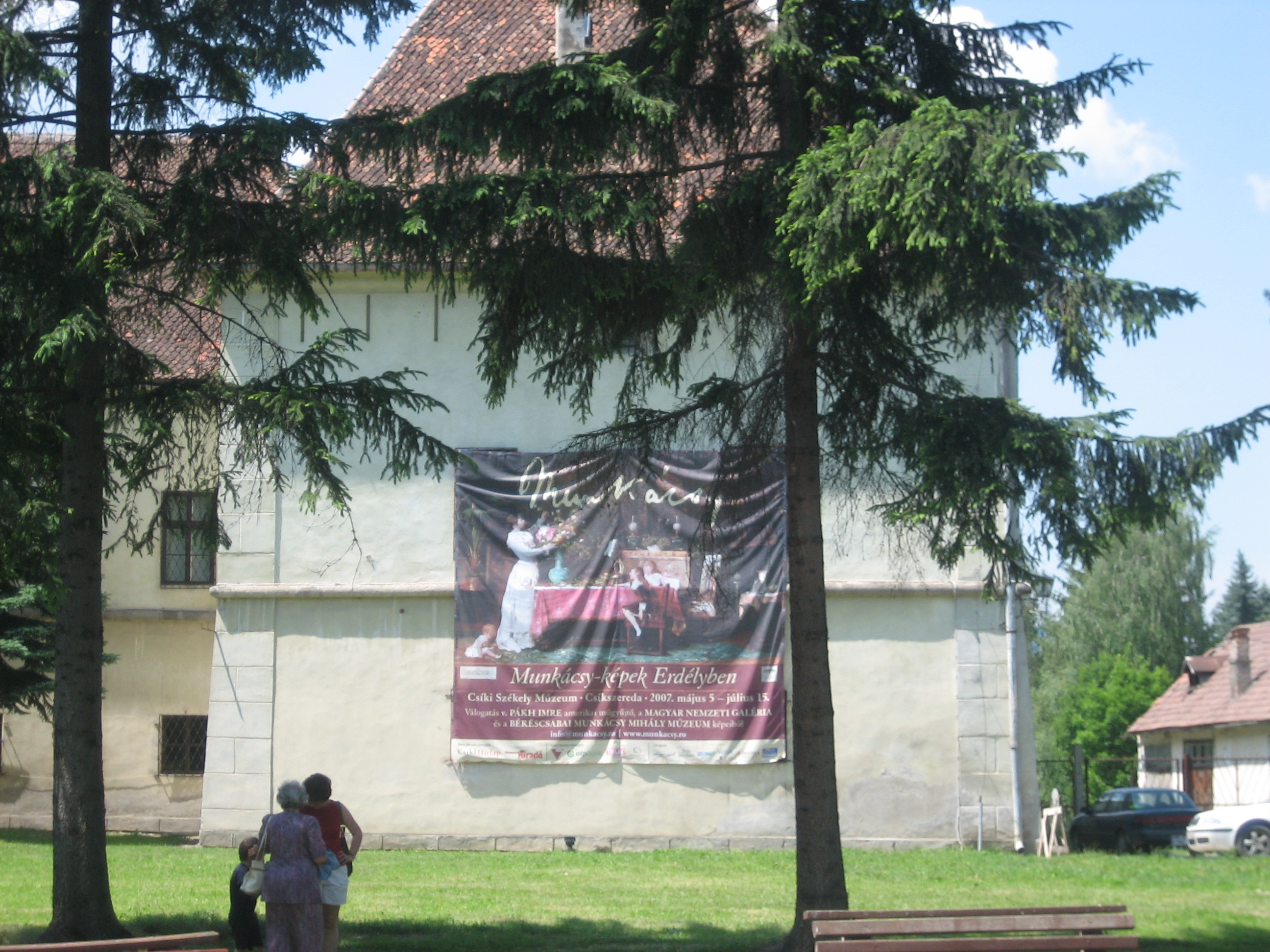
Bastion

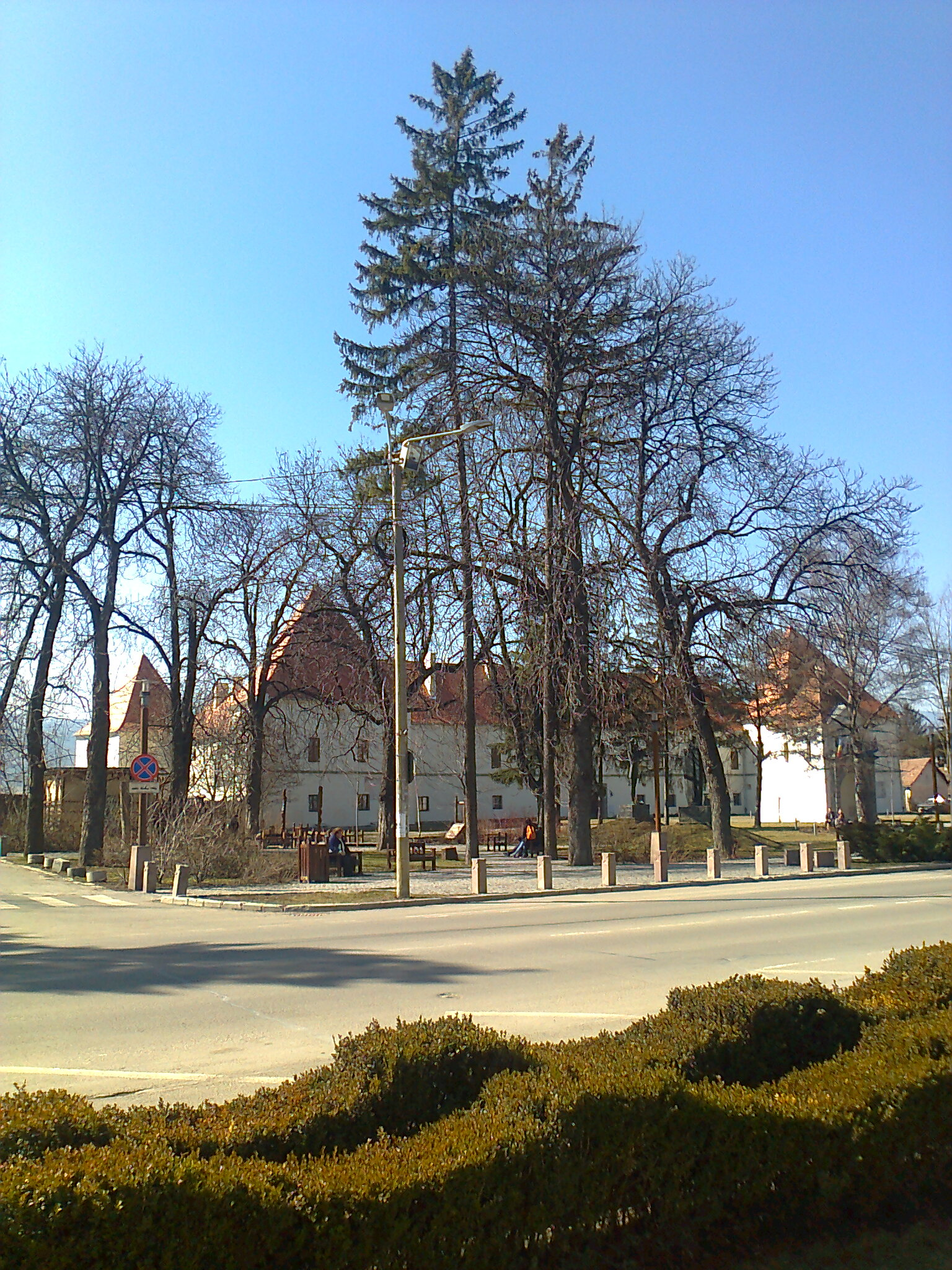
Panorama

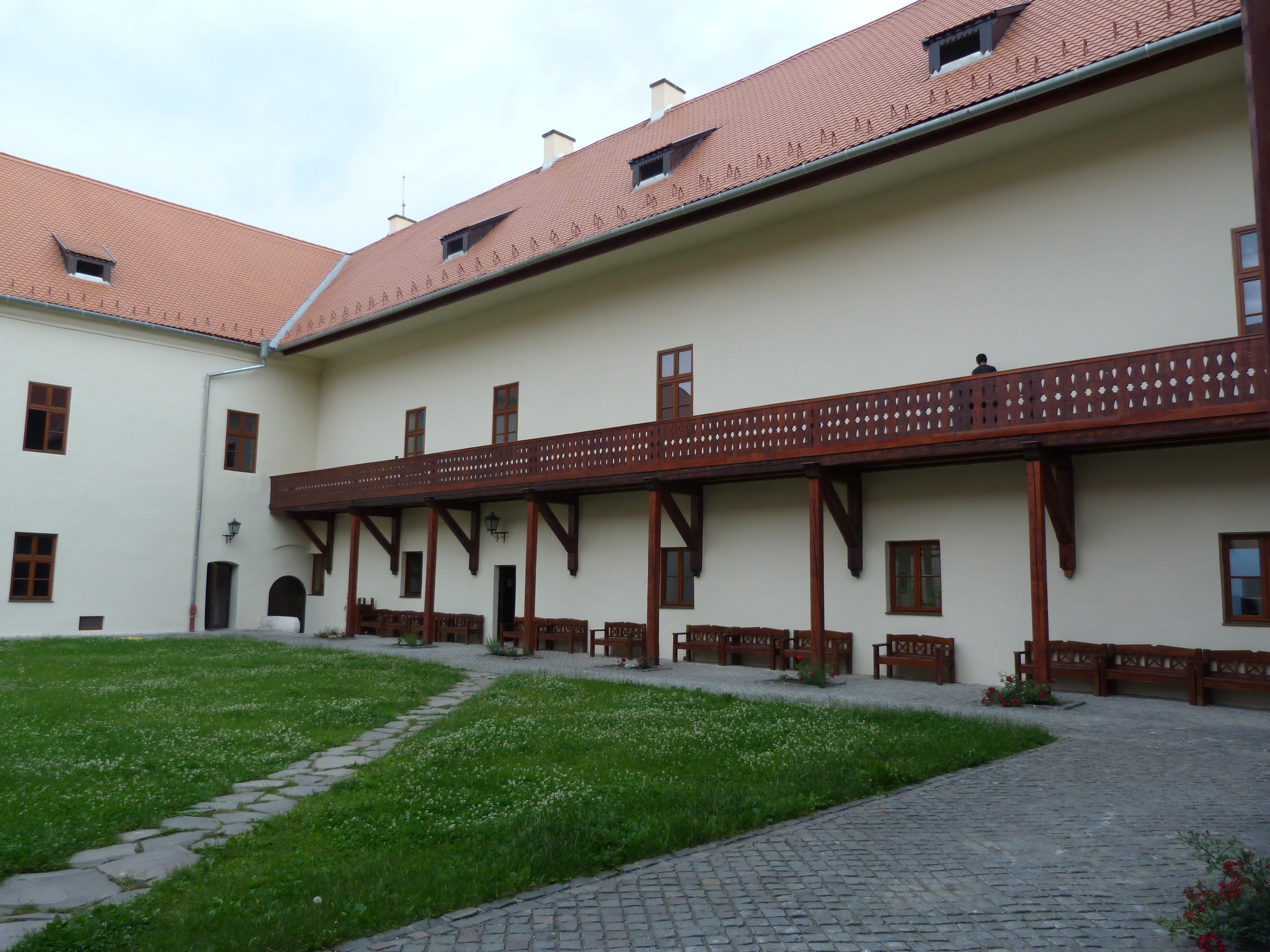
Inside the castle

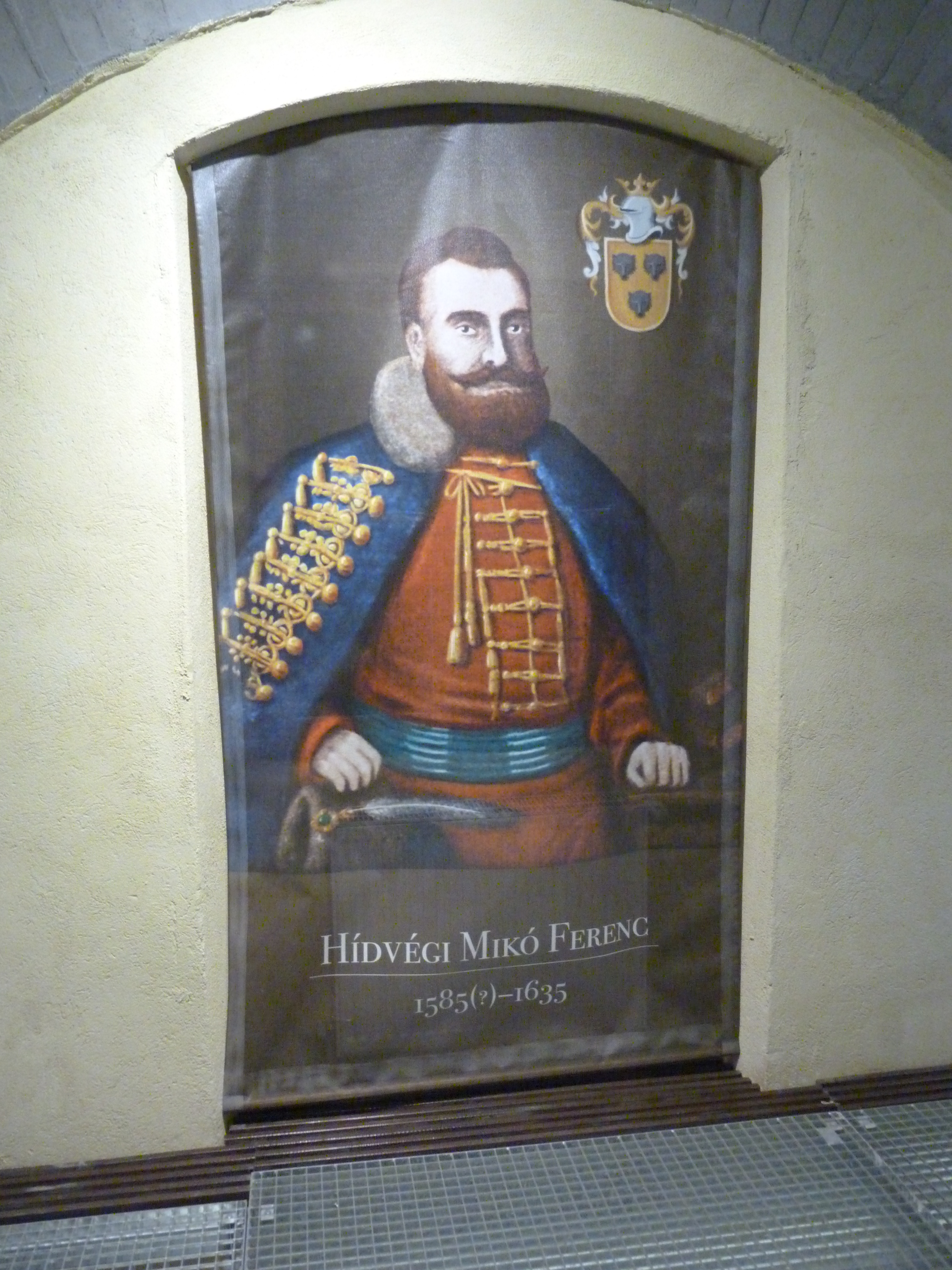
Gallery

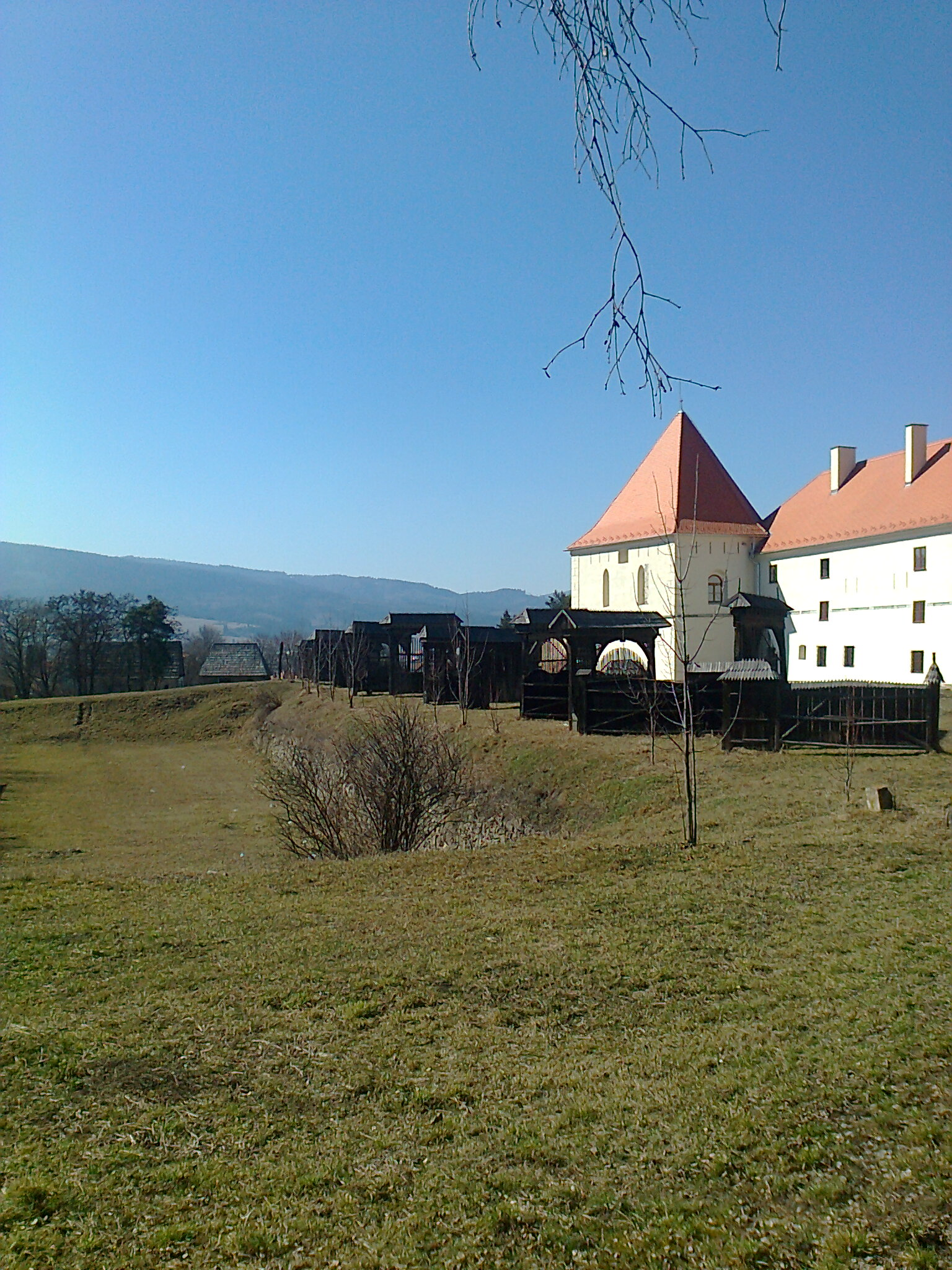
Szekler gates exhibition near the castle

== See also ==
- List of castles in Romania
- Tourism in Romania
- Villages with fortified churches in Transylvania
