= Covăsânț =

- Commune
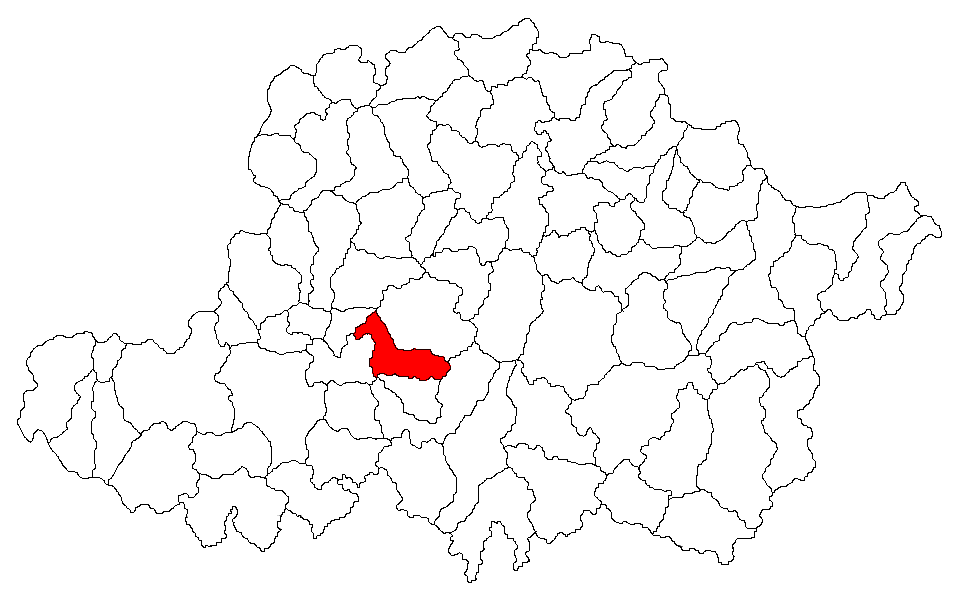
- Covăsânț within Arad County

- Location in Romania
- Coordinates: 46°12′00″N 21°36′06″E
- Country: Romania
- County: Arad
- Area: 42.27 km^{2} (16.32 sq mi)
- Population (2021-12-01): 2,494
  - Density: 59/km^{2} (150/sq mi)
- Time zone: EET/EEST (UTC+2/+3)
- Postal code: 317090
- Vehicle reg.: AR
- Website: www.primariacovasint.ro

Covăsânț (Hungarian: Kovászi) is a commune in Arad County, Romania.

Covăsânț commune is situated in the contact zone of the Zărand Mountains western foothills and the Arad Plateau, on the Matca channel. Its surface stretches over 4227 hectares. It is composed of a single village, Covăsânț, which lies at 28 km from Arad.

== Population ==
According to the last census, the population of the commune counts 2659 inhabitants, out of which 75.7% are Romanians, 0.5% Hungarians, 23.5% Roma and 0.3% are of other or undeclared nationalities.

== History ==
The first documentary record of the locality Covăsânț dates back to 1333.

== Economy ==
The commune's economy is mainly agricultural, characterized by livestock-breeding based on cattle-breeding, pomiculture and viticulture.

The main industry is agriculture.

== Tourism ==
Covăsânt commune is one of the most important access points to the Zărand Mountains' peaks, several scenic blazed paths leading to this territory.

Besides, the beautiful landscapes of Zărand Mountains, the commune has a rich touristic fond made by men. The "Tornea" castle, the remains of the castle named "Hindec", the ruins and the tower of a fascinating church dated from the 14th century are the most important sights which are worth visiting for every tourist coming to this region.
