= Macea Castle =

Coordinates: 46.384374°N 21.310129°E

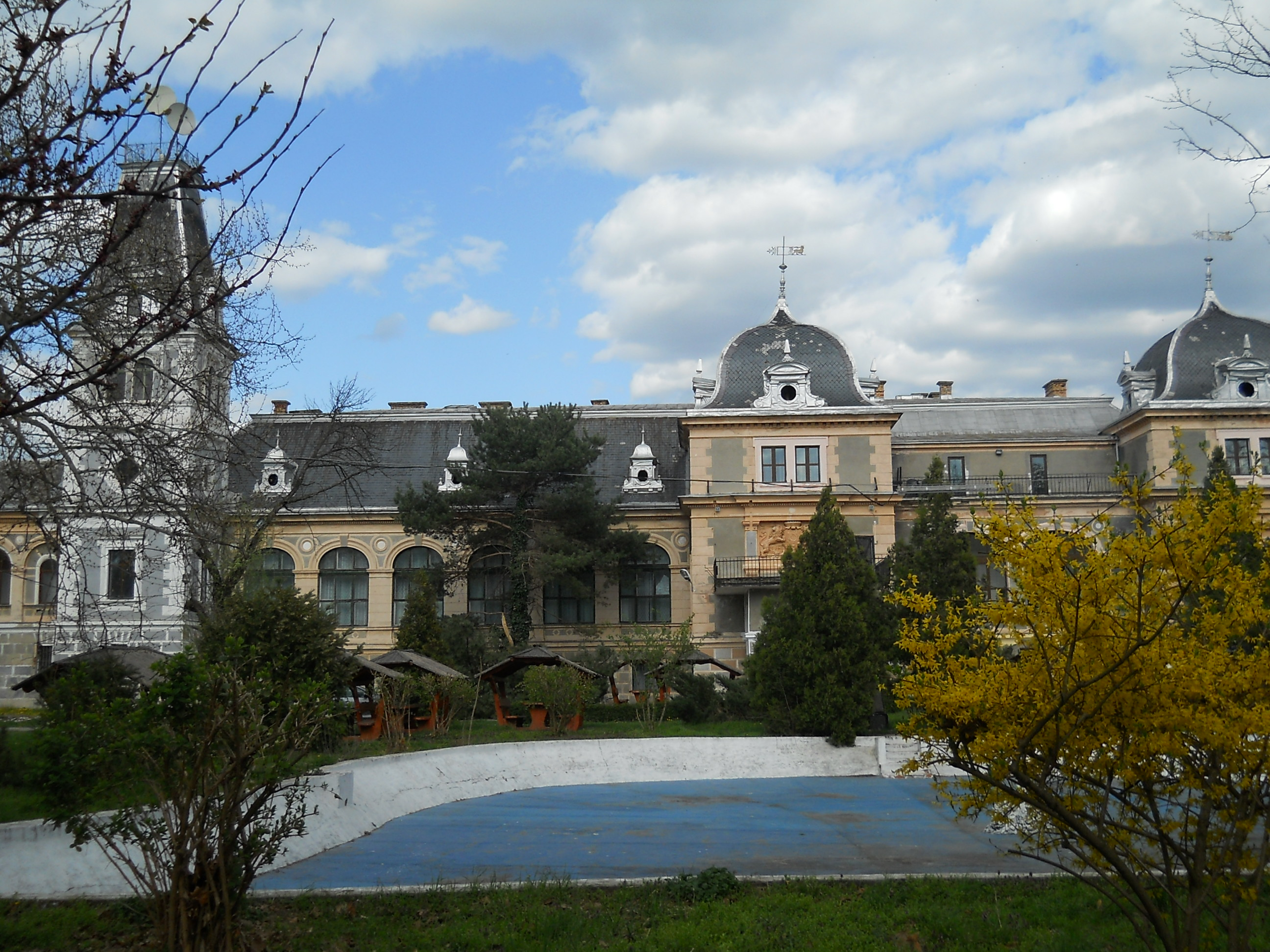
- Macea Castle

General information
- Architectural style: Secession style
- Location: Macea, Romania
- Construction started: 1745
- Client: Csernovics and Károlyi families

Macea Castle, also called Cernovici Castle or Csernovics Castle, is a castle located in Macea Commune, Arad County, Romania. It was built in the 18th and 19th centuries and belonged to two noble families, the Csernovics and Károlyi.

== History ==
The history of the castle is connected with the history of the noble family of Csernovics. They receive the nobility title from the Kingdom of Hungary in the year 1720. In the year 1724, Mihail and his son John (Ioan) get several estates including the Macea estate. In the same year begins the construction of a mansion in Macea, finished in the year 1745, which is the year of the death of Mihail. In that period the castle had only one wing, the east one with the two turrets. The wife of Mihail, Anne, becomes the next owner and she will buy the Curtici and Cutos estates. The nephew of Mihail, Lazarus Csernovics, is granted with the title of Graf (or Grof in the Romanian language) in the year 1793 by the Austrian Crown. In the year 1804 Paul Csernovics will become the owner of the Macea estate. He will take care of the appearance of the mansion. His son, Peter, is the one who will embellish the surroundings of the building. After a journey he made in 1845 in the Near East, Peter will bring diverse species of plants and trees which are then planted in the garden of the castle. It is believed the Csernovics may have lost the castle in a card game, after which ownership of the estate and the castle transferred to the Hungarian family of Nagy Károlyi.

The first Graf of Macea, György Károlyi commissioned extensive construction works after the transfer in 1866, adding a western wing to the castle and four-storey tower. With these changes the castle became similar to the French models in vogue at that time. His son, Tibor Károlyi, will take care of the park by expanding it on a surface of 100 holde of planted forest. In the year 1900, the owner was Gyula Károlyi, the one who will bring the photographer Ruhm Odon to take pictures of the castle. One image still exists. Gyula will be the one who adds a metallic terrace to the older wing of the building.

After 1912, the castle was neglected, the Graf being absorbed by the estate. From 1920, Gyula Karolyi retired at his residence in Budapest. In 1939, the castle and the park were passed to Adam Iancu, a doctor from Curtici, the owner until the 1948 expropriation. Subsequently, the castle will be used as an orphanage, asylum for blind persons, rehabilitation center for orphan children etc. After the Revolution, from the year 1991, the castle and the park were rented to the Vasile Goldiş West University of Arad. As of 2025, the university continues to occupy the castle.
