= Ovidiu Hațegan =

Romanian professional football referee (born 1980)

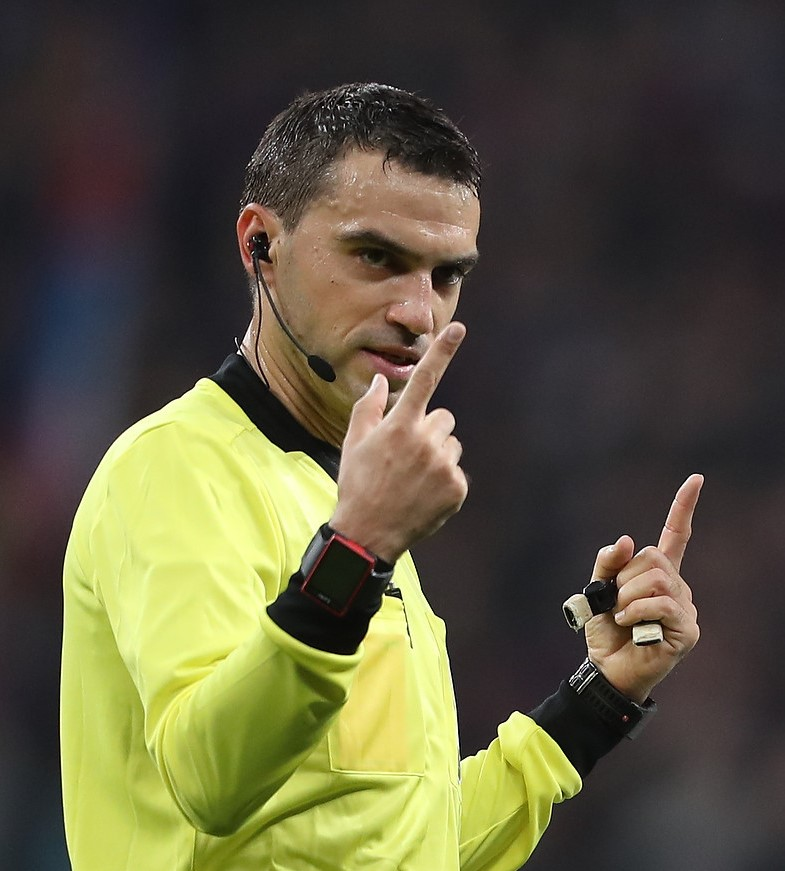
- Hațegan refereeing a Champions League game
- Full name: Ovidiu Alin Hațegan
- Born: 14 July 1980 (age 46); Arad, Romania
- Other occupation: General practice physician

Domestic
Years	League	Role
2006–	Liga I	Referee

International
Years	League	Role
2008–	FIFA listed	Referee

Ovidiu Alin Hațegan (Romanian pronunciation: [oˈvidju aˈlin hat͡seˈɡan]; born 14 July 1980) is a Romanian professional football referee who officiates primarily in the Liga I and for FIFA as a FIFA international referee. He is ranked as a UEFA elite category referee.

== Football career ==
Born in Arad, Hațegan became a FIFA referee in 2008. He went to referee at both the UEFA Euro 2012 and 2014 FIFA World Cup qualifying campaigns.

In 2013, UEFA president Michel Platini ordered an internal investigation to ascertain why Hațegan did not apply the protocol for dealing with allegedly racist chants from the crowd during a match at the Arena Khimki between Manchester City and PFC CSKA Moscow. CSKA Moscow was later charged with "racist behavior" for the incident, but Hațegan was absolved of blame.

In August 2016, Hațegan refereed in the men's football tournament at the 2016 Summer Olympics. He refereed two matches during this tournament, including the semifinal between Brazil and Honduras.

On 9 November 2017, he was in charge of the first leg of the 2018 World Cup qualification play-off between Northern Ireland and Switzerland. During this match, he awarded a penalty kick to Switzerland after the ball struck the arm of Northern Irish defender Corry Evans, which was tucked closely against his body. Switzerland scored the penalty kick and would go on to defeat Northern Ireland 1–0 on aggregate, earning qualification to the World Cup. Hațegan later admitted that he was wrong to award the penalty kick, and that this mistake may have played a part in his exclusion from the roster of match officials for the 2018 FIFA World Cup.

On 19 November 2018, after being informed at half-time of the UEFA Nations League fixture between Germany and the Netherlands of the death of his mother, and even though he could have legally been replaced, Hațegan chose to continue officiating until the end of the match, which ended 2–2 in Gelsenkirchen and qualified the visiting team to the final four. Visibly distraught, he was consoled after the full whistle by Dutch captain Virgil van Dijk.

Hațegan has refereed at two UEFA European Championships, officiating two group stage games each in the 2016 and 2020 tournaments.

In March 2022, Hațegan suffered a heart attack. Therefore, he was absent from the field for about a year and a half, but officiating matches as VAR both domestically and abroad, with appreciated interventions. Rated with high chances to participate, he missed also the 2022 FIFA World Cup.

Hațegan returned to the field in June 2023, the first official refereed match being after a break of 443 days. The first match in Romanian First League was in July 2023, 494 days away from the last match before the accident. Finally, Hațegan refereed and the first match in European competitions on October 26, 2023 - 588 days since his last European appearance.

== Personal life ==
Hațegan majored in medicine at the Victor Babeș University in Timișoara. He later taught anatomy in English at the Vasile Goldiș Western University in his hometown.

Hațegan married his wife Nicoleta in 2009, with the couple parenting two children.

== Refereeing record ==
=== UEFA Euro ===
2016 UEFA EURO – France
Date	Match	Venue	Round
12 June 2016	Poland – Northern Ireland	Nice	Group stage
22 June 2016	Italy – Republic of Ireland	Villeneuve-d'Ascq	Group stage

2020 UEFA EURO – Various
Date	Match	Venue	Round	Score
14 June 2021	Poland – Slovakia	Saint Petersburg	Group stage	1-2
20 June 2021	Italy – Wales	Rome	Group stage	1-0

=== Summer Olympics ===
2016 Summer Olympics – Men's tournament – Brazil
Date	Match	Venue	Round
7 August 2016	Brazil – Iraq	Brasília	Group stage
17 August 2016	Brazil – Honduras	Rio de Janeiro	Semi-Final

== See also ==
- István Kovács
- List of football referees
