= John R. Broderick =

American academic administrator

8th President of Old Dominion University
- In office June 15, 2008 – June 30, 2021
- Preceded by: Roseann Runte
- Succeeded by: Brian Hemphill

Personal details
- Born: 1955 (age 70–71) Bristol, Connecticut, U.S.
- Children: 3
- Education: Northeastern University; St. Bonaventure University
- Website: odu.edu/president

John R. Broderick is an American academic administrator who served as the eighth president of Old Dominion University from 2008 to 2021.

As president, he guided the University's six colleges, more than 10 economic development and research centers, and numerous partnerships with government, military and business organizations and agencies. He oversaw an operating budget in excess of $526 million and more than 2,500 faculty and staff members. More than $338 million in new buildings and building renovations have been authorized or completed under his tenure.

On February 12, 2021, it was announced that Radford University president Brian Hemphill, Ph.D. would succeed Broderick as the 9th president of Old Dominion University, slated to take office in August 2021.

== Early life ==
Born in 1955, Broderick is a native of Bristol, Connecticut. He and his wife, Kate Broderick, have three sons, two grandsons and one granddaughter.

== Education ==
Broderick received a bachelor's degree from Northeastern University and a graduate degree from St. Bonaventure University.

== Career ==
Early on in his career, Broderick was a newspaper reporter in Connecticut and Massachusetts and headed tourism and business organizations in both The Berkshires and the Island of Martha's Vineyard. Before coming to Old Dominion University, Broderick was a faculty member in the University of Pittsburgh system and an administrator at St. Bonaventure University.

Prior to becoming president of ODU, Broderick served as vice president of institutional advancement and admissions and chief of staff to the president. His areas of responsibility included admissions, athletics, community and governmental relations, marketing, media relations, military affairs and student financial aid.

=== Presidency of Old Dominion University ===
In the 10 years leading up to 2012, Old Dominion's enrollment grew from less than 20,000 to more than 25,000. Broderick, recognizing the need to plan for the future, commissioned a university-wide study designed to establish institutional priorities. The study led to the creation of a comprehensive strategic plan that would provide the blueprint with which to make decisions for the future of the University.

Shortly after becoming president, Broderick introduced a University-wide initiative aimed at student success and learning, which included a $10.2 million Student Success Center and Learning Commons and the creation of a vice president position and division for student engagement and enrollment services. Additionally, he has worked to keep the university affordable and accessible, while maintaining academic standards. He was awarded the 2012 American College Personnel Association's Contribution to Higher Education Award, one of the national organization's highest honors, for his leadership in student success initiatives.

Old Dominion's strategic plan called for the University to find new ways in which to engage the communities it serves. To support the economic development component of community engagement, Broderick presided over the launch of the ODU Business Gateway, a business-friendly portal to the University, and the Innovation Foundation, a foundation created to help streamline processes by which the University, its faculty and its students can participate in commercial endeavors.

Broderick's pursuit of parity in state funding and responsiveness to legislative calls for more efficiency, affordability and access in higher education have led to historic levels of state funding for Old Dominion and several of its initiatives, in particular modeling and simulation, bioelectrics, increased STEM degrees and online programs, and student financial aid, among others. Over the past two years, Old Dominion received more than $30 million in additional funding from the General Assembly.

Broderick oversaw the renewal of football at Old Dominion in 2009, with the Monarchs posting the most successful record of any start-up team in FCS history. He served on the NCAA board of directors and as chair of the President's Football Championship Series advisory committee. This past spring, the University announced a membership agreement with Conference USA and a reclassification of its football program from the NCAA Division I Football Championship Subdivision to the Football Bowl Subdivision.

In 2011, they created the Broderick-Evon Award for Community Engagement and Service with the help of other family members who choose to remain anonymous. The award recognizes students who have demonstrated a commitment to service and civic engagement to the university and surrounding community through superior leadership and service. The award, named in honor of President and Mrs. Broderick's mothers, was presented for the first time on May 3, 2012 at the University's annual Student Honors and Awards Dinner.

The University's Board of Visitors voted in 2012 to extend his contract to 2017. In May 2020, Broderick announced his retirement as the University's president to take effect after the hiring of a suitable replacement. In February 2021, Broderick's successor, Dr. Brian Hemphill, the president of Radford University, was announced.

=== Leadership positions ===
Throughout his career, Broderick has been actively engaged in numerous community and professional organizations. He currently serves as one of six college presidents on the Governor's Commission on Higher Education Reform, Innovation and Investment, is a representative to the American Association of State Colleges and Universities Council of State Representatives, and is a board member of the Hampton Roads Partnership, Urban League and MacArthur Foundation.

He has lectured on leadership for a variety of institutions and organizations, including the University of Bologna and the Virginia Chamber of Commerce Executive Association.

He has also enjoyed many years as a youth soccer league coach in Chesapeake.

== Honors and awards ==
At St. Bonaventure University’s 166th undergraduate commencement held in May 2026, Broderick received an honorary doctorate for his contribution to higher education. Kate Broderick was presented the first Distinguished Graduate School Alumnus Award and also delivered the address at that ceremony.

Broderick has been recognized for his contributions to higher education and the Hampton Roads community with the American College Personnel Association's Contribution to Higher Education Award, Virginia Center for Inclusive Communities' Humanitarian Award, the Urban League of Hampton Roads' Marian Palmer Capps Award, the College Communicators Association Distinguished Service Award, Lead Hampton Roads' Julian F. Hirst Award for excellence in community, civic and professional leadership, and a 2011 Visionary Award from the Hampton Roads Chamber of Commerce. He was a finalist for the national PR News' Professional of the Year Award.

In 2016, Old Dominion University named its newest dining hall in honor of Broderick and his wife "at the request of student leaders, for spearheading inclusion initiatives and to recognize their commitment to student success."

Additionally, under his guidance, the university has been named a Chronicle of Higher Education's "Great Place to Work" for two consecutive years.
