= Macea =

Commune in Romania

- Commune
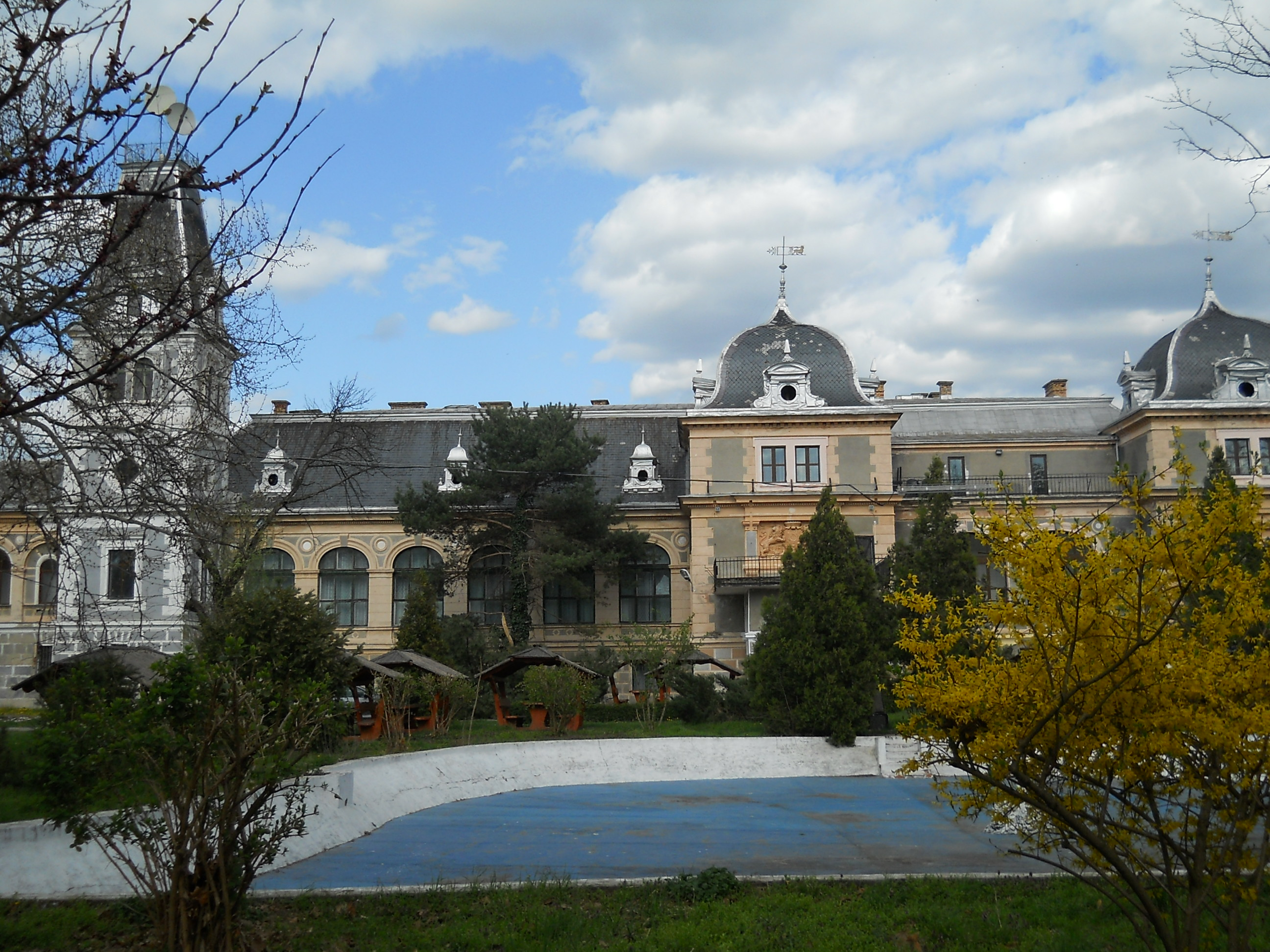
- The Macea Castle

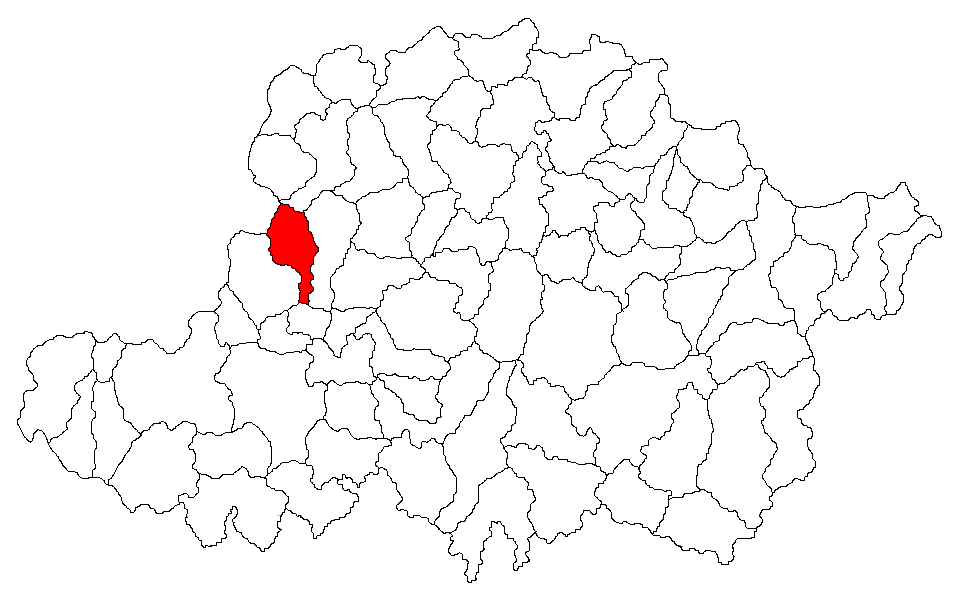
- Location in Arad County

- Location in Romania
- Coordinates: 46.38°N 21.33°E
- Country: Romania
- County: Arad

Government
  - Mayor (2017–present): Ciprian-Gheorghe Otlăcan (PNL)
- Area: 72.64 km^{2} (28.05 sq mi)
- Elevation: 97 m (318 ft)
- Population (25 April 2026): 6,500 +
  - Density: 89/km^{2} (230/sq mi)
- Time zone: UTC+02:00 (EET)
  - Summer (DST): UTC+03:00 (EEST)
- Postal code: 317210
- Area code: (+40) 02 57
- Vehicle reg.: AR
- Website: macea.ro

Macea (Hungarian: Mácsa; German: Matscha) is a commune in Arad County, Romania, composed of two villages, Macea and Sânmartin (Szentmárton, Aradsanktmartin).

The commune is located in the western part of the county, on the border with Hungary, at a distance of 6 km (3.7 mi) from Curtici and 23 km (14 mi) from the county seat, Arad.

== Population ==
According to the 2011 census, the population of the commune counts 5,762 inhabitants, out of which 84.24% are Romanians, 5.97% Roma (also known as Gypsy), 2.43% Hungarians, 1.44% Germans, and 5.64% are of other or undeclared nationalities.

== History ==
Although the traces of inhabitance on this place are very old, traces from the Neolithic and from the Bronze Age having been found on its territory, Macea was first mentioned in documents only in 1380, while Sânmartin in 1477.

== Economy ==
The commune's present-day economy can be characterized by a powerful dynamic force with significant developments in all the sectors present in the commune. Livestock-breeding based on cattle-growing and pig-raising is the main economic branch, due to which food industry is well-developed in the commune.

== Tourism ==
Tourist sites include the natural reservation called "Arboretul de la Macea", which covers and area of 20.5 ha (51 acres). The Macea Castle (also called Csernovics Castle) is an architectural monument belonging to the national patrimony, built in the 19th century, the exhibition room with caricatures, well as the beach and the botanical garden.

Macea village gives home to a festival of caricature and humour every year.

== Summer school ==
Since 2003, the Macea Castle is the home of "Informatica la Castel" annual event (formerly "Linux and Virtual Learning Environments", LVLE), a Free Software summer school organised by the Vasile Goldiș Western University of Arad and ARLUG, the Arad Linux Users Group.

== Gallery ==
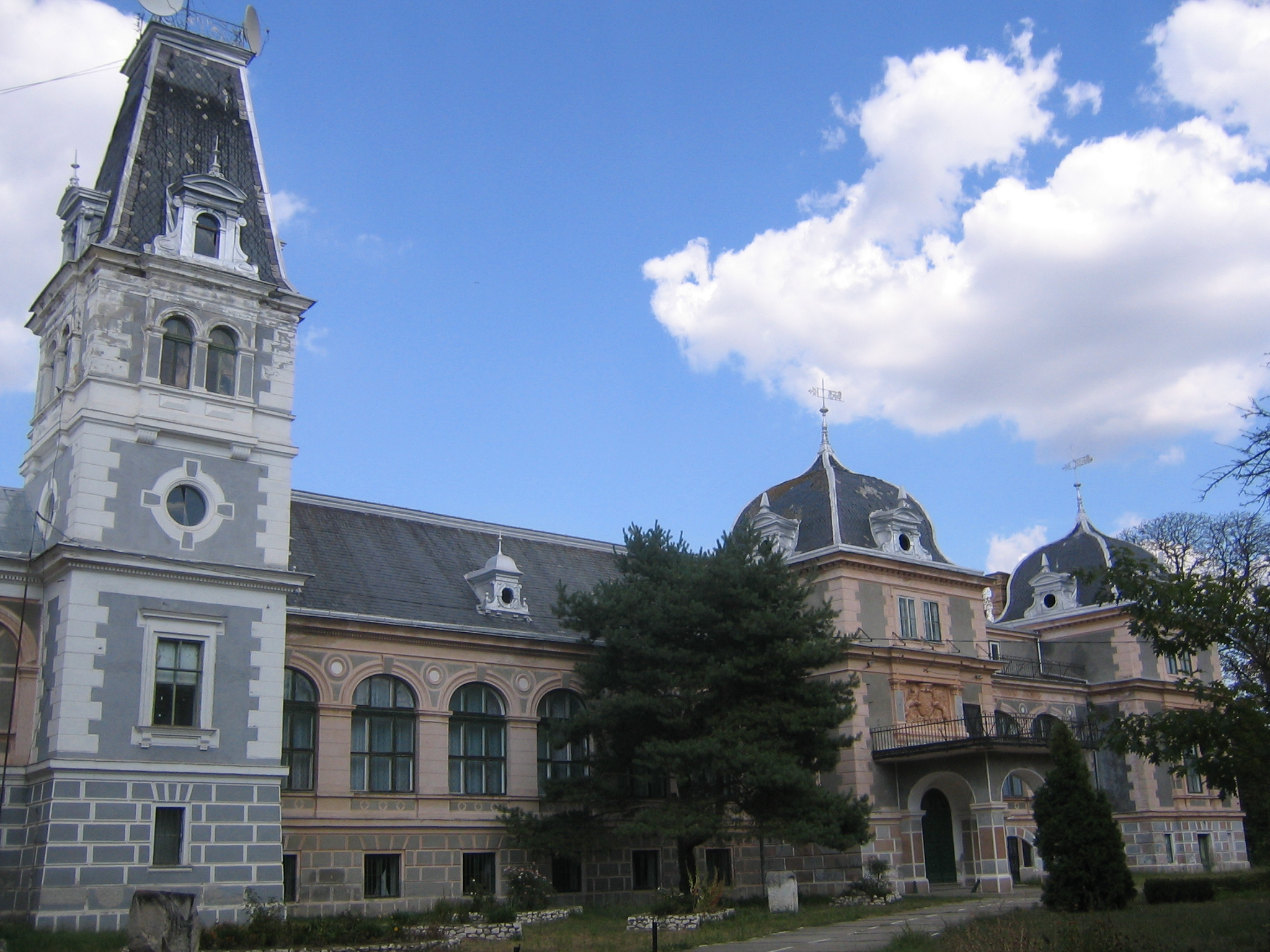
Macea Castle

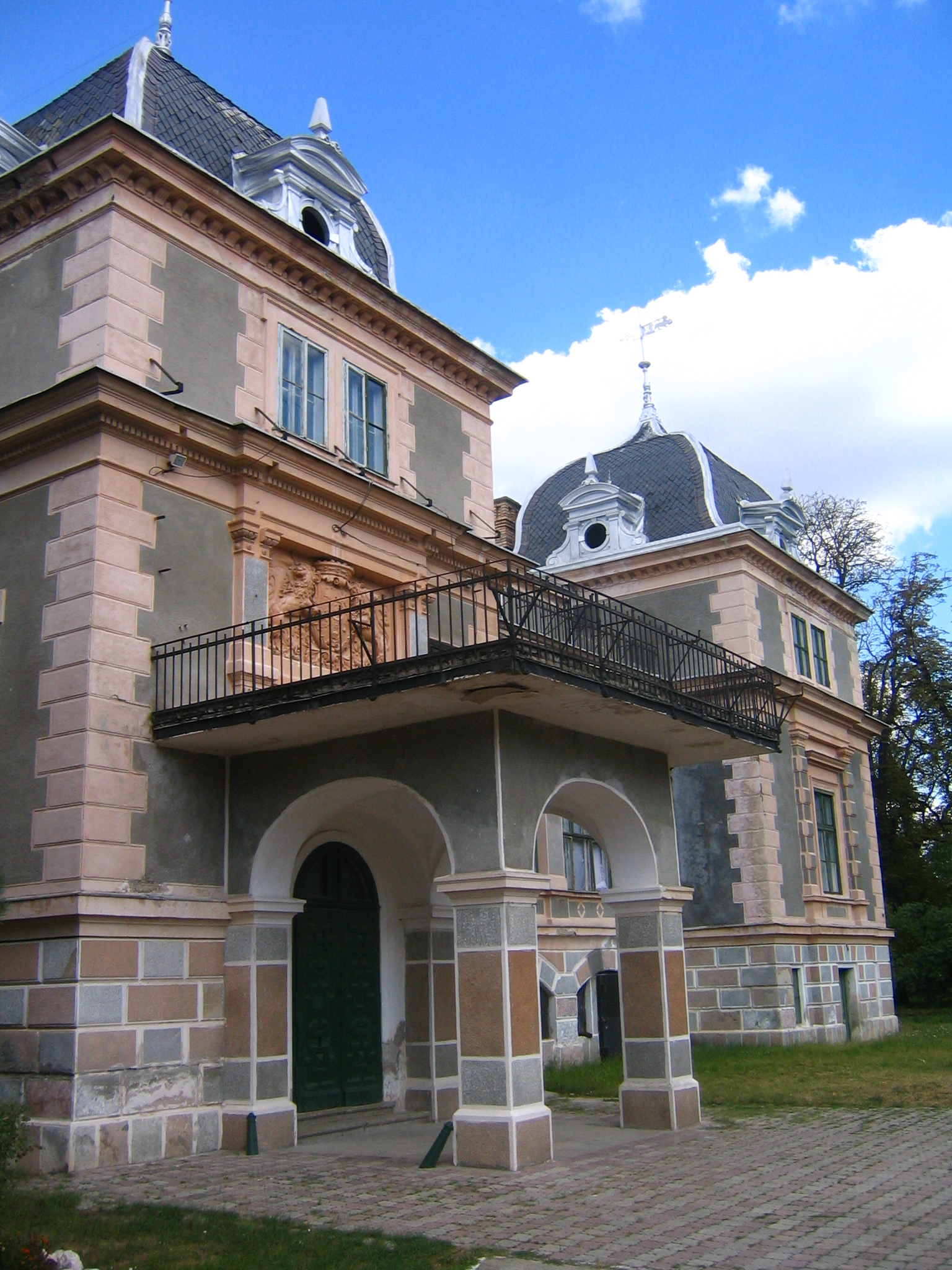
Macea Castle

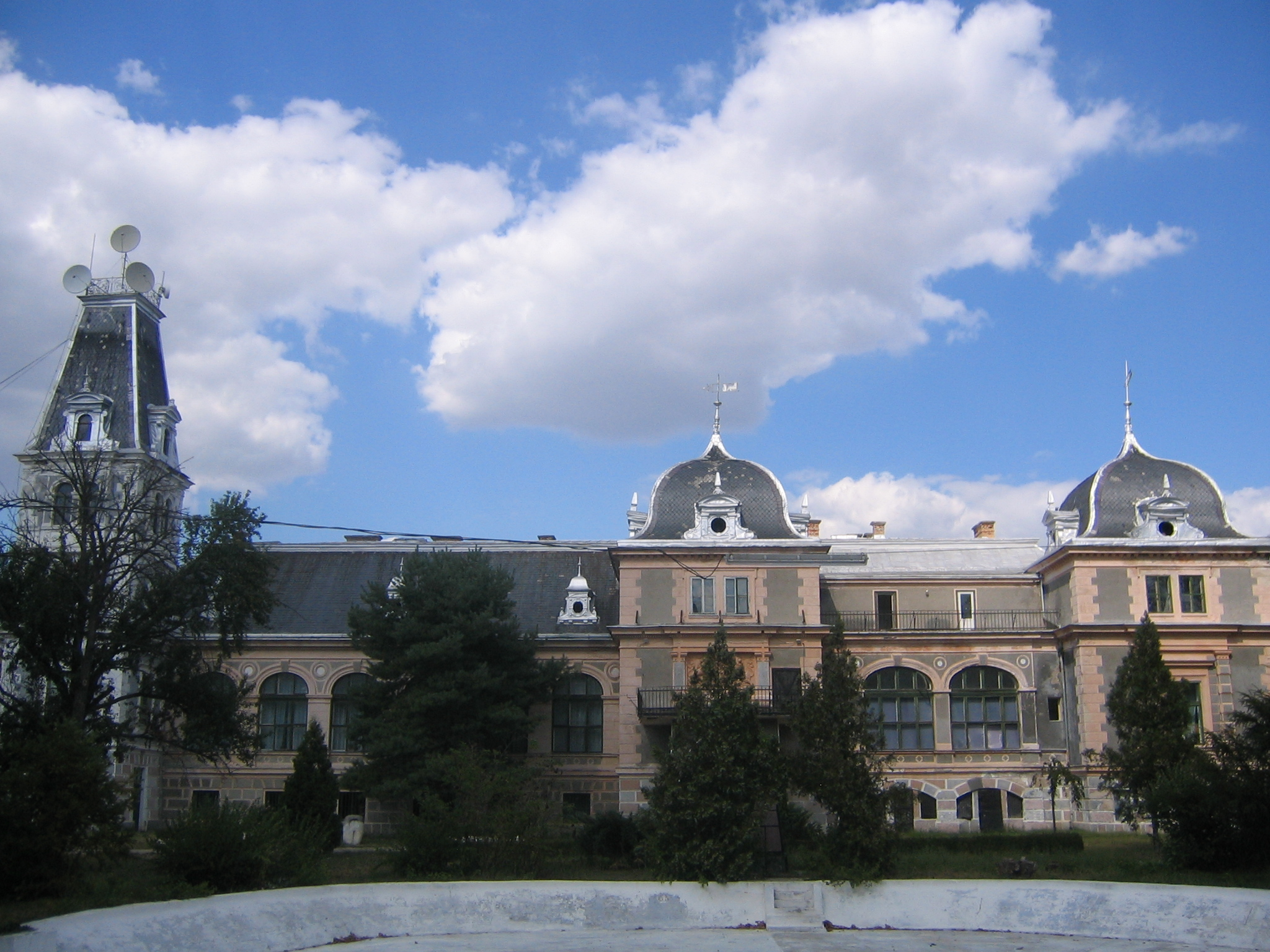
Macea Castle
