= Penelope W. Kyle =

American lawyer

President of Radford University
- In office June 1, 2005 – June 2016
- Succeeded by: Brian Hemphill

Executive Director of Virginia Lottery
- In office 1994–2005
- Governor: George Allen; Jim Gilmore; Mark Warner

Personal details
- Born: Southwest Virginia, U.S.
- Education: Guilford College; University of Virginia School of Law (JD); College of William & Mary (MBA)

Penelope W. Kyle is an American academic administrator and government employee, who served as the former president of Radford University, a public, state-funded, comprehensive university, located in Radford, Virginia. She assumed her role on June 1, 2005, and retired in June of 2016.

== Career ==
Kyle graduated from Guilford College in Greensboro, North Carolina and did her postgraduate studies in English at Southern Methodist University in Dallas, Texas. She received her Juris Doctor from the University of Virginia School of Law and later earned her MBA from the College of William & Mary.

Kyle served as Executive Director of the Virginia Lottery for 11 years, under three successive governors. First appointed by Governor George Allen in 1994, she was reappointed by Governor Jim Gilmore, and then reappointed once again by Governor Mark Warner. Previously, Kyle was employed by CSX Corporation, an international transportation company, where she became the company's first female officer. Before joining CSX Corporation, she was an attorney with McGuireWoods, LLP in Richmond. She also taught English for six years at Thomas Nelson Community College in Hampton, Virginia.

Kyle served on the Board of Visitors at James Madison University (JMU) from 1984 until 1992 and on the JMU Foundation Board 1992 until 1994. She also served on the Virginia Commonwealth University Foundation Board from 1994 until 2000 and on the Board of Governors of Saint Christopher School from 1999 until 2005. Kyle was also a member of the Board of Directors of the Roanoke Regional Chamber of Commerce. She is currently a member of the Board of Directors of PRA, Inc., a publicly traded company, and has been since 2005.

Kyle became Radford University's sixth, and first female, president when she took office on June 1, 2005. On March 30, 2015, Kyle announced that she would retire as Radford University president effective June 30, 2016. In February 2016, the Radford University Board of Visitors announced that the College of Business and Economics Building (COBE) would be named after Kyle.

== Family ==
Kyle is married to Charles L. Menges, an attorney and partner with McGuire, Woods, LLC. They are the parents of three children.

A native of Southwest Virginia, Kyle attended Galax, Virginia public schools.
