= Roseann Runte =

American poet

Roseann Runte OC

President and Vice-Chancellor of Carleton University
- In office July 1, 2008 – July 31, 2017
- Preceded by: David W. Atkinson; Samy Mahmoud (interim)
- Succeeded by: Benoit-Antoine Bacon

President of Old Dominion University
- In office July 1, 2001 – June 30, 2008
- Preceded by: James V. Koch
- Succeeded by: John R. Broderick

11th President and Vice-Chancellor of Victoria University, Toronto
- In office 1994 – 2001
- Chancellor: Sang Chul Lee; Kenneth D. Taylor
- Principal, Victoria College: William J. Callahan; David B. Cook
- Preceded by: Eva Kushner
- Succeeded by: Paul W. Gooch

President of Université Sainte-Anne
- In office 1983–1988
- Preceded by: Charles Gaudet
- Succeeded by: Harley d'Entremont

Personal details
- Born: 1948 (age 77–78) New York
- Education: State University of New York at New Paltz
- Salary: Carleton: $358,474.46 (2012); ODU: Between $300,000 and $400,000
- Website: carleton.ca; odu.edu

Roseann O'Reilly Runte was president and CEO of the Canada Foundation for Innovation from 2017 to 2024 Previous to that, she was a university professor and the president and vice-chancellor of Carleton University in Ottawa, Canada. She was also the seventh president of Old Dominion University in Norfolk, Virginia, only the third woman to head a four-year college or university in Virginia. She has previously served as president of Victoria University, Toronto, principal of Glendon College, and president of l'Université Sainte-Anne.

Aside from her achievements in academia, she has served as President of the Canadian Commission for UNESCO and on the boards of EXPO 2000, the United Way and the Club of Rome.

== Early life and education ==
A dual citizen of the United States and Canada, Runte earned her bachelor's degree in French from SUNY New Paltz and her master's and doctorate from the University of Kansas. Additionally, she has received honorary degrees from Acadia University, Memorial University of Newfoundland, Vasile Goldiș Western University of Arad and the West University of Timișoara.

== Career ==
On January 7, 2008, The Globe and Mail announced that Runte would become president of Carleton University in Ottawa.

On March 24, 2017, a press release from Carleton University announced that Runte would be leaving to pursue another leadership opportunity as of July 31, 2017. She then served as president and CEO of the Canada Foundation for Innovation until 2024.

== Critical acclaim and recognition ==
Runte's poetry has been translated into English, Chinese, Korean, Japanese and Romanian. While much of her writing is poetry, she is also noted for her works on cultural studies, with emphasis on the role of women in society.

Runte has been awarded the Order of Canada, the French Order of Merit, fellowship in the Royal Society, the Queen Elizabeth II Golden Jubilee Medal, the Palmes Académiques and a prize from the Académie française. Runte currently sits on the board of directors of Montreal-based National Bank of Canada.

== Bibliography ==
- Roseann Runte (1974). La Fontaine's heritage: his reputation and influence on eighteenth-century France. University of Kansas.
- Roseann Runte, ed. (1978). Studies in eighteenth-century culture. University of Wisconsin Press. ISBN 978-0-299-07400-5.
- Roseann Runte; Roger L. Emerson; Gilles Girard, eds. (1984). Man and nature: Proceedings of the Canadian Society for Eighteenth-Century Studies. The University of Western Ontario.
- Roseann Runte (1993). Birmanie blues; suivi de, Voyages à l'intérieur. Éditions du GREF. ISBN 978-0-921916-25-3.
- Runte, Roseann, Ghi̕sa, Dorin (1994). Poeme / Roseann Runte; în române̕ste de Dorin Ghi̕sa. Editura Hestia. ISBN 978-973-96074-8-3.
- Alfred Bader (2000). Roseann Runte (ed.). A Canadian in love. Victoria University. ISBN 978-0-7727-5700-5.
- Roseann Runte, ed. (2001). The Foundation for International Training: twenty-five years dedicated to international development. Legas. ISBN 978-1-894508-18-6.

== See also ==
- List of Canadian university leaders

Academic offices
Preceded by James V. Koch	President of Old Dominion University; 2001-2008	Succeeded by John R. Broderick
