= Brian Hemphill =

American academic administrator

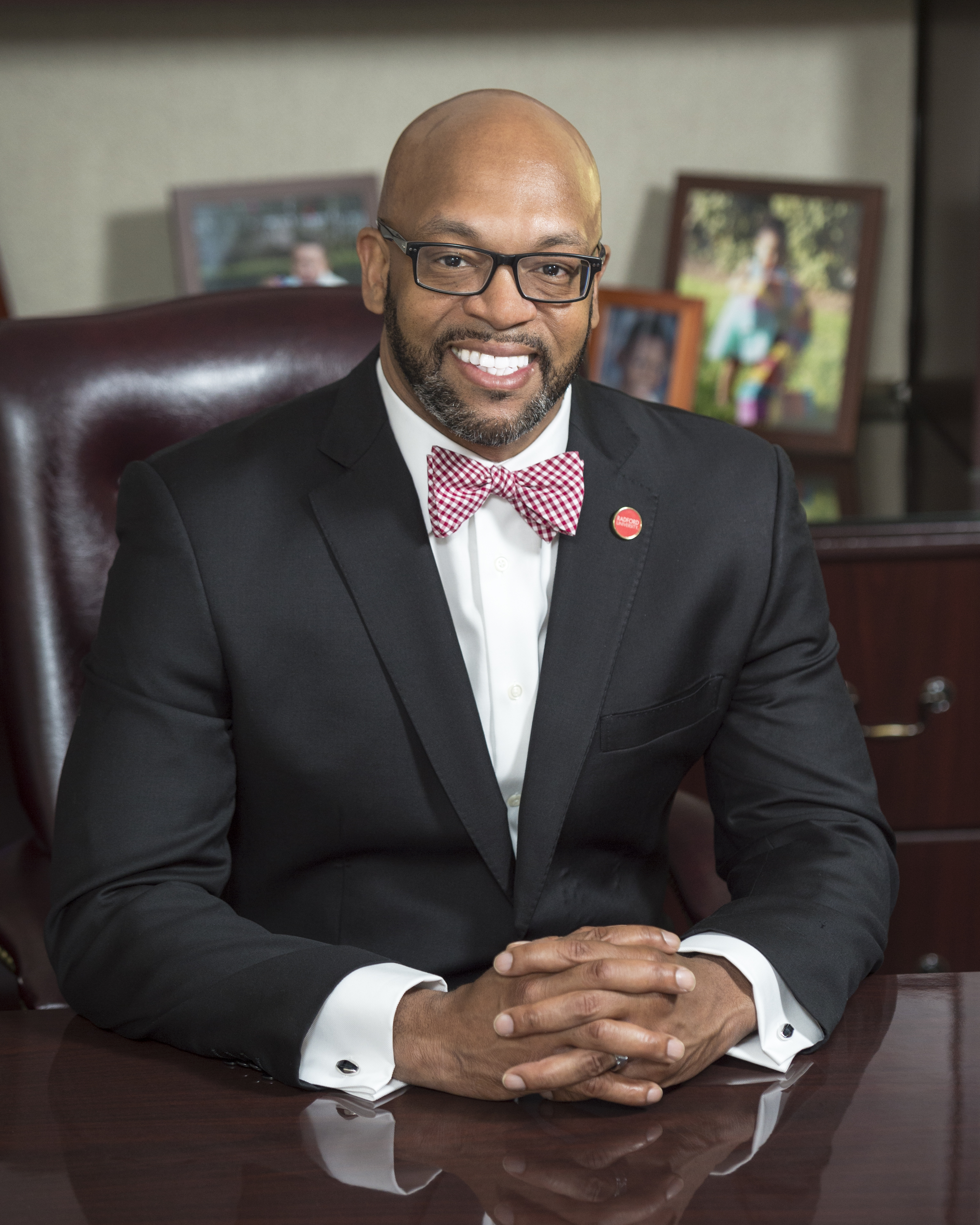

9th President of Old Dominion University
- Incumbent
- Assumed office July 1, 2021
- Preceded by: John R. Broderick

7th President of Radford University
- In office July 1, 2016 – June 30, 2021
- Preceded by: Penelope W. Kyle
- Succeeded by: Carolyn Ringer Lepre (interim)

10th President of West Virginia State University
- In office July 1, 2012 – July 30, 2016
- Preceded by: Hazo W. Carter
- Succeeded by: Anthony L. Jenkins

Personal details
- Born: Brian Hemphill
- Spouse: Marisela Rosas Hemphill
- Education: St. Augustine's University (B.A.); Iowa State University (M.S.) University of Iowa (Ph.D)

Brian O. Hemphill is an American academic administrator, researcher, author and the current president of Old Dominion University, his third university presidency in a decade. Before taking the role at ODU, Hemphill was president of Radford University and West Virginia State University. On February 12, 2021, Dr. Hemphill was announced as the 9th president of Old Dominion University in Norfolk, Virginia. He had become president of West Virginia State University in 2012 and of Radford in 2016. Before the West Virginia position, he had been vice president for student affairs and enrollment management at Northern Illinois University, where he received several student and professional awards, and was praised for his work in the aftermath of a 2008 campus mass shooting. He later edited a book on campus violence as well as presenting papers on leadership and crisis management in higher education.

Hemphill's leadership at ODU has been marked by controversy over the university's expansion of accelerated online courses, culminating in a 2026 vote of no confidence by the Faculty Senate despite continued support from the Board of Visitors.

== Education ==
In 1992, Hemphill received a B.A. in organizational communication from St. Augustine's University. In 1994, he earned an M.S. in journalism and mass communication from Iowa State University. In 1998, he earned a Ph.D. in higher education administration and policy studies at the University of Iowa.

== See also ==
- List of presidents of West Virginia State University
