= The Tartan (Radford University) =

- Issue of The Tartan from March 16, 2010 (Volume 111, Issue 11)
- Type: Weekly student newspaper
- Editor-in-chief: Brandon Whitaker 2025-Present
- Founded: 1921 (Grapurchat) 1978 (The Tartan)
- Headquarters: "The Bonnie" Hurlburt Student Center, Radford University
- Circulation: 300 copies weekly
- Website: https://www.rutartan.com

The Tartan or The Tartan: Radford University News is a student-run newspaper published weekly for readers in and around Radford University in Radford, Virginia. Its function is to provide the students and faculty of Radford University, as well as the residents of the surrounding city of Radford, with news pertaining to the university and surrounding community. The paper is circulated every Tuesday (Tartan Tuesdays) as part of their weekly newspaper, and is the most widely circulated publication in the town of Radford. The paper was first published in January 1921.

== History ==
The Tartan was originally named The Grapurchat. Its first issue was four pages, featured one picture, and detailed a cocktail party which had happened the week before. In 1978, The Grapurchat rebranded to The Tartan and its staff has now grown to include an Editor in Chief, a Managing Editor, a Section Editor, three Copy Editors, five staff writers, and a Webmaster The Tartan has a weekly circulation of 300 copies distributed across Radford’s campus.

The Tartan utilizes the RU Student Media's in-house advertising agency, SMADS, to gather and design advertisements which it uses as its main stream of revenue. Since the COVID-19 pandemic the advertising agency has remained dormant although the new editions still feature campus advertisements.

In March 2011, The Tartan launched a WordPress website to complement the print form of the publication. The website features a mix of articles published in the weekly issues of the paper, but also plays host to content uploaded throughout the week that does not get published in the weekly Wednesday editions.
