= Old Dominion University =

Public university in Norfolk, Virginia, US

- Former name: List: Norfolk Division of the College of William & Mary (1930–1962) Old Dominion College (1962–1969)
- Type: Public research university
- Established: March 13, 1930; 96 years ago
- Accreditation: SACS
- Academic affiliations: CUMU; SCHEV; Sea-grant; Space-grant
- Endowment: $388.9 million (2025)
- President: Brian Hemphill
- Faculty: 2,927
- Students: 23,469
- Undergraduates: 17,504
- Postgraduates: 5,965
- Location: Norfolk, Virginia, United States; 36°53′12″N 76°18′19″W
- Campus: 251 acres (1.02 km^{2}); Midsize city
- Other campuses: Hampton; Portsmouth; Virginia Beach
- Newspaper: Mace & Crown
- Colors: Slate blue, silver, and light blue
- Nickname: Monarchs
- Sporting affiliations: NCAA Division I FBS – Sun Belt; Big East; Big 12; ASUN; The American; MAISA
- Mascot: Big Blue
- Website: www.odu.edu

Old Dominion University (ODU) is a public research university in Norfolk, Virginia, United States. Established in 1930 as the two-year Norfolk Division of the College of William & Mary, the school became an independent college in 1962 and attained university status in 1969. In 2023, it had an enrollment of 23,494 students, and its main campus covers 250 acres.

The university's name is derived from one of Virginia's state nicknames, "The Old Dominion", given by King Charles II of England in recognition of its loyalty to the crown during the English Civil War. ODU offers 175 undergraduate and graduate degree programs from seven colleges and three schools. It has a Carnegie Classification of "R1: Doctoral Universities – Very high research activity" with "Higher Access, Medium Earnings". Old Dominion has approximately 165,000 alumni in all 50 US states and 67 countries.

== History ==
Old Dominion University was founded in 1930 as a Norfolk extension of the College of William and Mary. This branch was envisioned by administrators and officials such as Robert M. Hughes, a member of the Board of Visitors of William and Mary from 1893 to 1917, and J. A. C. Chandler, the eighteenth president of that school. In 1924 after becoming the director of the William and Mary extension in Norfolk, Joseph Healy began organizing classes and finding locations for faculty and staff. Due to his work, along with that of Robert M. Hughes, J. A. C. Chandler, and A. H. Foreman, a two-year branch division was established on March 13, 1930. On September 12, 1930, the Norfolk Division of the College of William and Mary held its first class with 206 students (125 men and 81 women) in the old Larchmont School building, an unused elementary school on Hampton Boulevard. On September 3, 1930, H. Edgar Timmerman became the Division's first director.

"The Division", as it was often called, started in the old Larchmont School building and allowed people with fewer financial assets to attend a school of higher education for two years. Tuition for the first year was US$50. The following September, Virginia Polytechnic Institute, more commonly known as Virginia Tech, also began offering classes at "The Division.", expanding course offerings to teachers and engineers. Created as it was in the first year of the Great Depression, the college benefited from federal funding as part of President Franklin D. Roosevelt's New Deal. The Public Works Administration provided funds for the Administration Building, now Rollins Hall, and Foreman Field, named after A. H. Foreman, an early proponent of the college. The college grew south along Hampton Boulevard, turning an empty field into a sprawling campus.

In 1932, Lewis Warrington Webb joined the faculty as an instructor of engineering; he would later be called "the Father of Old Dominion". After serving ten years as an instructor at the Norfolk Division of the College of William and Mary, Webb was appointed assistant director in 1942. Webb also served as director of the Defense and War Training Program from 1940 to 1944. Through its defense and training classes, the Norfolk Division contributed to the American WWII war effort. The program also allowed the school to remain open during a period when many young men were in the armed service. The program attracted many women, who learned aircraft repair, drafting, and other war-related subjects. In 1946, Webb was appointed Director of the Norfolk Division. Webb's dream was to see the Norfolk Division become an independent institution.

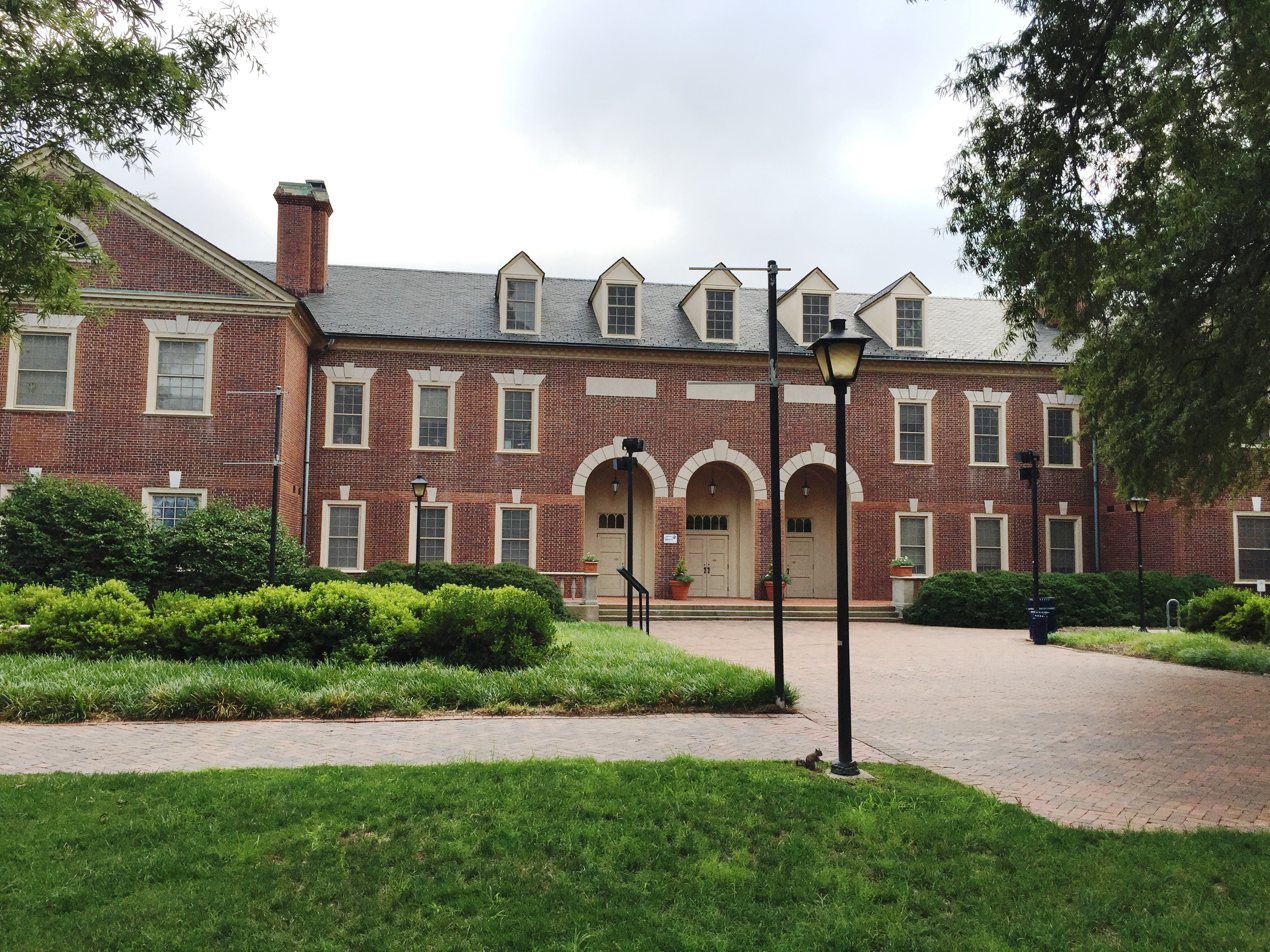
Rollins Hall along the Williamsburg Lawn

The two-year Norfolk Division rapidly evolved into a four-year institution. On February 16, 1962, the William and Mary system was dissolved under General Assembly legislation that was signed by Governor Albertis S. Harrison, effectively making the Norfolk Division independent. Later that year the Norfolk Division was renamed Old Dominion College. Webb served as the first president of Old Dominion College from 1962 to 1969.

Frank Batten, who was the publisher of The Virginian-Pilot and The Ledger-Star and a member of the Norfolk Division's advisory board, was chosen as the first rector of Old Dominion College on May 27, 1962, holding the position until 1970. (The College of Engineering was named in his honor in 2004.) In 1964, the first students lived on campus in dormitories Rogers Hall and Gresham Hall, named for members of the advisory board.

Growth in enrollment, expansion of research facilities, and preparation for graduate programs led the board to seek university status. In 1969, Old Dominion College transitioned to Old Dominion University under the leadership of President James L. Bugg Jr. During Bugg's tenure, the earliest doctoral programs were established, along with a university-wide governance structure with representation from faculty, administrators, and students. Bugg also reestablished the Army ROTC program that had been created in 1948 but abandoned during the Korean War.

In the 1970s, under President Alfred B. Rollins Jr., Old Dominion established partnerships between regional organizations such as the Eastern Virginia Medical School and Norfolk State University. Under Rollins, the university expanded its state and private funding, improved student services, and introduced an honors program. In 1971 Old Dominion University established its own police force and hired several officers to attend the Tidewater Police Academy. In 1977 the Virginia General Assembly passed the Campus Police Act giving public campus police officers full law enforcement authority.

Since this time, the university has continued to expand, now enrolling over 24,000 students. The Norfolk campus has experienced significant growth in both student population and geography. Additionally, ODU has established satellite campuses in Virginia Beach, Portsmouth, and Hampton.

=== 2026 shooting ===
At around 10:50 a.m. on 12 March, a fatal shooting occurred inside Constant Hall. The attacker, Mohamed Bailor Jalloh, killed an ROTC instructor and injured two cadets before being fatally stabbed by other members of the group. The injured were transported to the Sentara Norfolk General Hospital in critical condition. Classes were cancelled and operations on the main campus were suspended for the remainder of the day. The incident was investigated as an act of terrorism.

=== Directors and presidents ===
Directors of the Norfolk Division
| H. Edgar Timmerman | 1930–1932 |
| Edward L. Gwathmey | 1932 |
| William T. Hodges | 1933–1941 |
| Lewis W. Webb Jr. | 1946–1962 |
Presidents of Old Dominion University
| Lewis W. Webb Jr. | 1962–1969 |
| James L. Bugg Jr. | 1969–1976 |
| Alfred B. Rollins Jr. | 1976–1985 |
| Joseph M. Marchello | 1985–1988 |
| William B. Spong Jr. (Interim) | 1989–1990 |
| James V. Koch | 1990–2001 |
| Roseann Runte | 2001–2008 |
| John R. Broderick | 2008–2021 |
| Brian O. Hemphill | 2021–pres. |

The Jacobson House is the on-campus home for the university president.

== Academics ==
Academic rankings

National
- U.S. News & World Report: 280
- Washington Monthly: 122
- WSJ/College Pulse: 501-600

Global
- ARWU: 701–800
- THE: 601–800
- U.S. News & World Report: 989

As a comprehensive university, Old Dominion University offers and develops humanities, science, health sciences, technology, engineering, business, arts, education, and professional programs. The university offers 73 bachelor's degrees, 60 master's degrees, and 35 doctoral degrees.

Because Hampton Roads is a major international maritime and commerce center, the university has a special mission for the Commonwealth of Virginia in commerce, and in international affairs and cultures. With the principal marine and aerospace activities of the Commonwealth concentrated in Hampton Roads, the university has a significant commitment to science, engineering, and technology, specifically in marine science, aerospace, and other fields of major importance to the region. Many departments conduct cooperative research with NASA. ODU is one of the few universities in the US to offer MBA concentrations in maritime, transportation, and port logistics management and also has well-respected programs in marine science and coastal and transportation engineering. Due to its location in a large metropolitan area, Old Dominion University places particular emphasis on urban issues, including education and health care, and the arts.

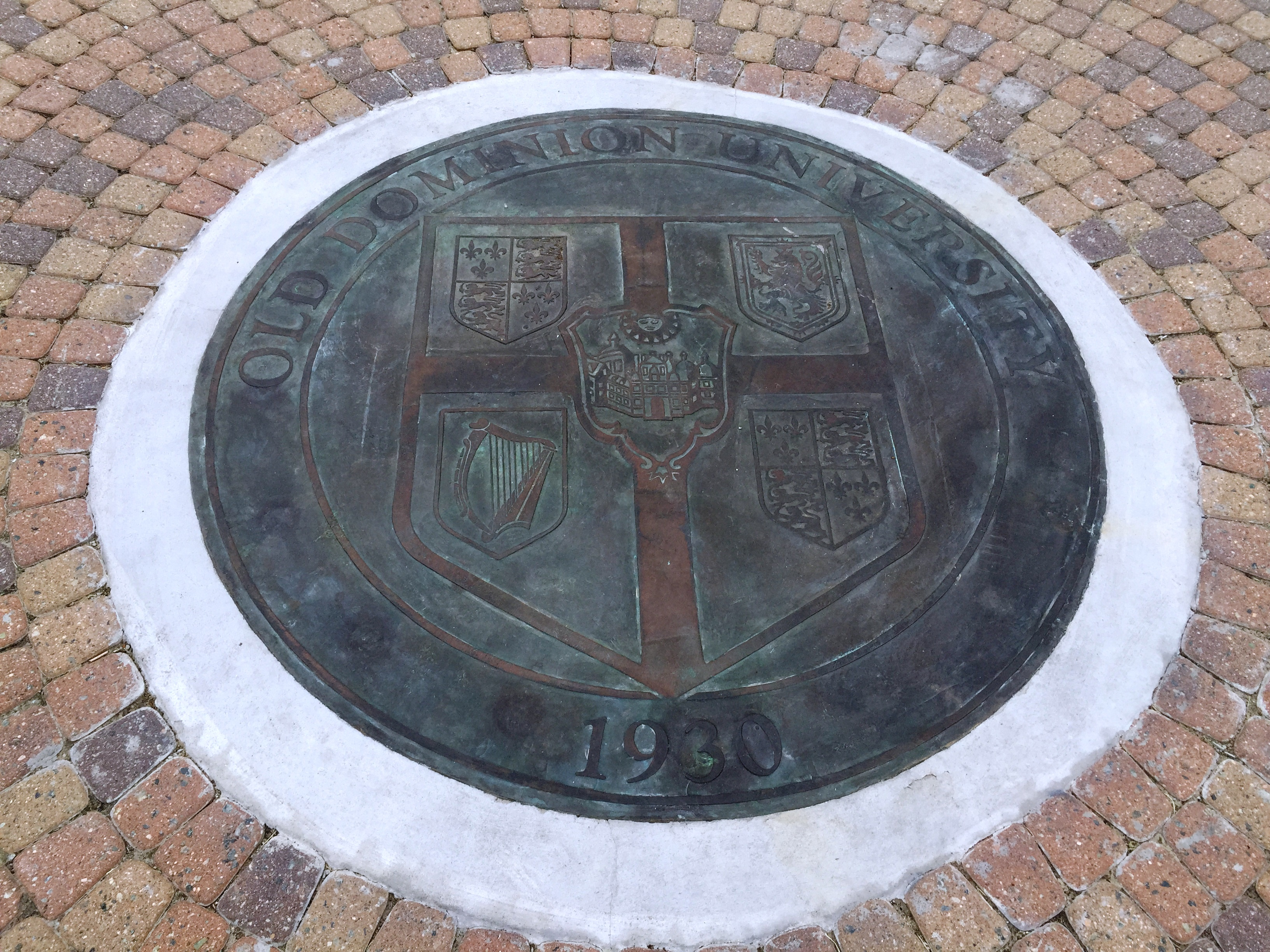
Old Dominion University Seal - Kaufman Mall

=== Undergraduate admissions ===
In 2024, Old Dominion University accepted 95.1% of undergraduate applicants with those admitted having an average 3.3 GPA and an average 1170 SAT score or an average 24 ACT score.

=== Accreditation ===
Old Dominion University is accredited by the Southern Association of Colleges and Schools Commission on Colleges (SACS/COC) to award baccalaureate, master, education specialist, and doctoral degrees. The Batten College of Engineering and Technology is accredited by the Engineering Accreditation Commission of ABET. The Strome College of Business is AACSB accredited. The Darden College of Education, the College of Arts and Letters, and the College of Sciences are accredited by National Council for Accreditation of Teacher Education.

== Colleges and schools ==
=== College of Arts and Letters ===
The College of Arts and Letters offers undergraduate and graduate degree programs in the humanities, arts, and social sciences.

=== College of Sciences ===
The College of Sciences offers undergraduate and graduate degree programs across seven departments.

=== Ellmer College of Health Sciences ===
The Ellmer College of Health Sciences offers undergraduate and graduate degree programs across five schools: School of Dental Hygiene, School of Medical Diagnostic and Translational Services, School of Exercise Science, School of Speech-Language Pathology, and School of Rehabilitation Sciences. Planning is underway for the establishment of a new Joint School of Public Health.

=== Eastern Virginia Medical School ===
ODU merged with Eastern Virginia Medical School on July 1, 2024, forming the Macon and Joan Brock Virginia Health Sciences at Old Dominion University. After the merger, EVMS became the medical school component of Old Dominion University.

=== School of Data Science ===
In his 2022 State of the University Address, President Hemphill announced plans for the establishment of a new School of Data Science. The School of Data Science will offer undergraduate and graduate degree programs.

=== Batten College of Engineering and Technology ===
The Batten College of Engineering and Technology offers undergraduate and graduate degree programs across six departments.

In 2010, the Frank Batten College of Engineering and Technology became the first college in the United States offering all degrees in the emerging discipline of Modeling and Simulation (B.S., M.E., M.S., D.Eng., Ph.D.).

=== School of Cybersecurity ===
On October 1, 2020, Old Dominion University launched the School of Cybersecurity, the first of its kind in the country. The ODU School of Cybersecurity offers a B.S degree program in Cybersecurity, Cyber Operations, and an M.S in Cybersecurity. Faculty and staff are drawn from across all colleges and reporting units at the university, including information technology services, VMASC, and military affairs.

=== Strome College of Business ===
The Strome College of Business college offers undergraduate and graduate degree programs across six departments along with the School of Accountancy, School of Public Service, and the Harvey Lindsay School of Real Estate.

The Gregory A. Lumsden Trading Room and Research Lab (LTR), opened in the fall 2012, is equipped with 24 Bloomberg terminals, making it one of the largest labs in the United States.

In 2014, the College of Business and Public Administration was renamed the Strome College of Business after the Strome family donated $11 million to the college.

In 2019, the Strome College of Business opened the Institute for Innovation & Entrepreneurship (IIE) in downtown Norfolk. It provides resources and services for innovation, entrepreneurship, and new enterprises and programs. The Institute contains the Strome Entrepreneurial Center (SEC), Tempo, the Veterans Business Outreach Center (VBOC), the Women's Business Center (WBC), the Business Development Center (BDC), and the Open Seas Technology Innovation Hub.

=== Darden College of Education and Professional Studies ===
The Darden College of Education and Progressional Studies offers undergraduate and graduate degree programs across six departments.

The Darden College of Education also works in collaboration with other academic colleges to prepare teachers in fields of secondary education, such as English education, biology education, etc. Students complete a major in the field they wish to teach, in addition to education coursework, practica, and student teaching.

=== Perry Honors College ===
The Perry Honors College provides undergraduates traditional classes combined with Honors courses, experiential learning, undergraduate research, campus events, and a capstone experience.

=== ODU Global ===
Old Dominion University began offering distance learning courses in 1994 through Teletechnet, a satellite delivery system. Currently, ODU offers more than 100 undergraduate and graduate degree programs online through ODU Global. ODU partners with the Virginia Community College System (VCCS) to offer other services such as libraries, computer labs, exam proctoring, and disability services all around the state. ODU also offers programs designed to be taken by military personnel on deployment.

== Research ==
Old Dominion University research teams generate $88 million in annual funding through more than 400 ongoing projects supported by grants from NSF, NIH, the Department of Energy, and the DOD. According to the National Science Foundation, ODU spent $73.6 million on research and development in 2021.

The university is classified among "R1: Doctoral Universities – Very high research activity."

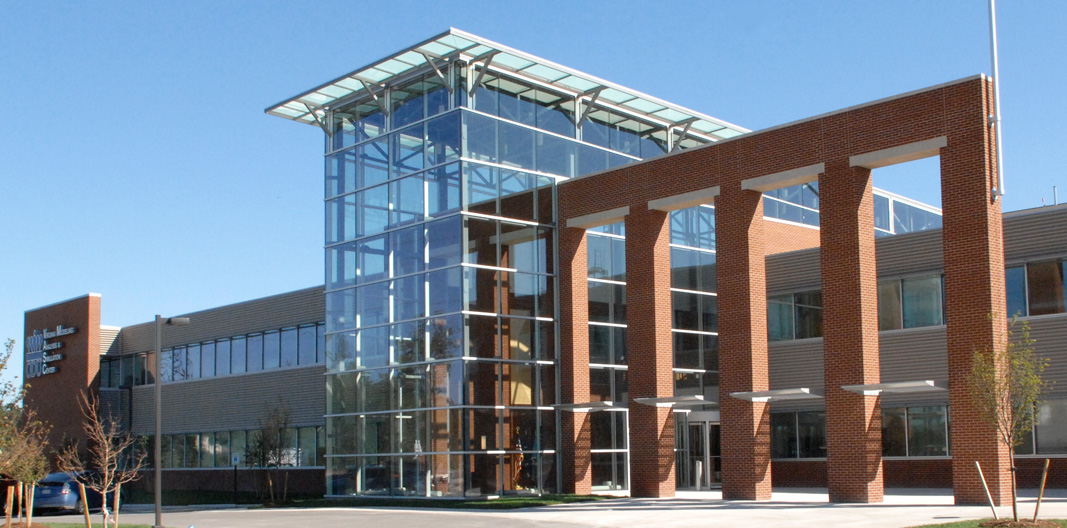
Virginia Modeling, Analysis, and Simulation Center

Research Centers at the university include:

- Applied Research Center
- Center for Accelerator Science
- Center for Coastal Physical Oceanography
- Center for Educational Partnerships
- Center for Innovative Transportation Solutions
- Center for Quantitative Fisheries Ecology
- Center for Telehealth Innovation, Education & Research (C-TIER)
- Dragas Center For Economic Analysis and Policy
- E.V. Williams Center for Real Estate
- Engineering Makerspace and Invention Center (EMIC)
- Frank Reidy Research Center for Bioelectrics
- International Maritime, Ports, & Logistics Institute
- National Centers for System of Systems Engineering (NCSOSE)
- Plasma Engineering & Medicine Institute
- Social Science Research Center
- Virginia Institute for Image & Vision Analysis
- Virginia Institute for Spaceflight & Autonomy
- Virginia Modeling, Analysis, and Simulation Center (VMASC)

=== Center for Accelerator Science ===
The Center for Accelerator Science in the Physics Department at Old Dominion University is an interdisciplinary research center, involving faculty from four departments. The center operates in close partnership with the Thomas Jefferson National Accelerator Facility. The goal of the center is to meet the nation's need for scientists and engineers who will advance the next generation of accelerators and light sources - tools that enable an ever-widening range of basic and applied research, numerous medical applications, as well as industrial and Homeland Security functions. The center offers both researchers and students access to facilities at ODU and Jefferson Laboratory.

=== Center for Telehealth Innovation, Education & Research (C-TIER) ===
The mission of C-TIER is to promote innovation, education, and research in telehealth for those involved in the provision of healthcare, healthcare education, research, and healthcare technologies through collaborative opportunities, educational programs, and telehealth innovation.

=== Dragas Center for Economic Analysis and Policy ===
The Dragas Center for Economic Analysis and Policy in the Strome College of Business at Old Dominion University undertakes economic, demographic, transportation, and defense-oriented studies. The Dragas Center produces the State of the Region Report for Hampton Roads, as well as the State of the Commonwealth Report for Virginia. The Dragas Center also produces economic forecasts for Hampton Roads, Virginia, and the United States.

=== International Maritime, Ports & Logistics Institute ===
Old Dominion University's International Maritime, Ports, & Logistics Institute, in the Strome College of Business, was created through a university/business community partnership in Hampton Roads. Its function is to provide maritime, ports, and logistics management education, training, and research to meet regional, national, and international needs.

At the October 2011 Annual Meeting of the International Association of Maritime Economists (IAME) in Santiago (Chile), university rankings worldwide in port research for the period 1980-2009 were announced. In these rankings, ODU was ranked eighth in the world, second only to the University of Washington in the Western Hemisphere.

=== Social Science Research Center ===
The Social Science Research Center is a social science research center with staff involved in various forms of research methods and data collection, including mail surveys, telephone surveys, household interviews, focus groups, and most conventional forms of data analysis.

=== Virginia Modeling, Analysis & Simulation Center (VMASC) ===
The Virginia Modeling, Analysis and Simulation Center (VMASC) is a university-wide multidisciplinary research center that emphasizes modeling, simulation, and visualization (MS&V) research, development, and education.

== Campus ==
=== Norfolk Campus ===
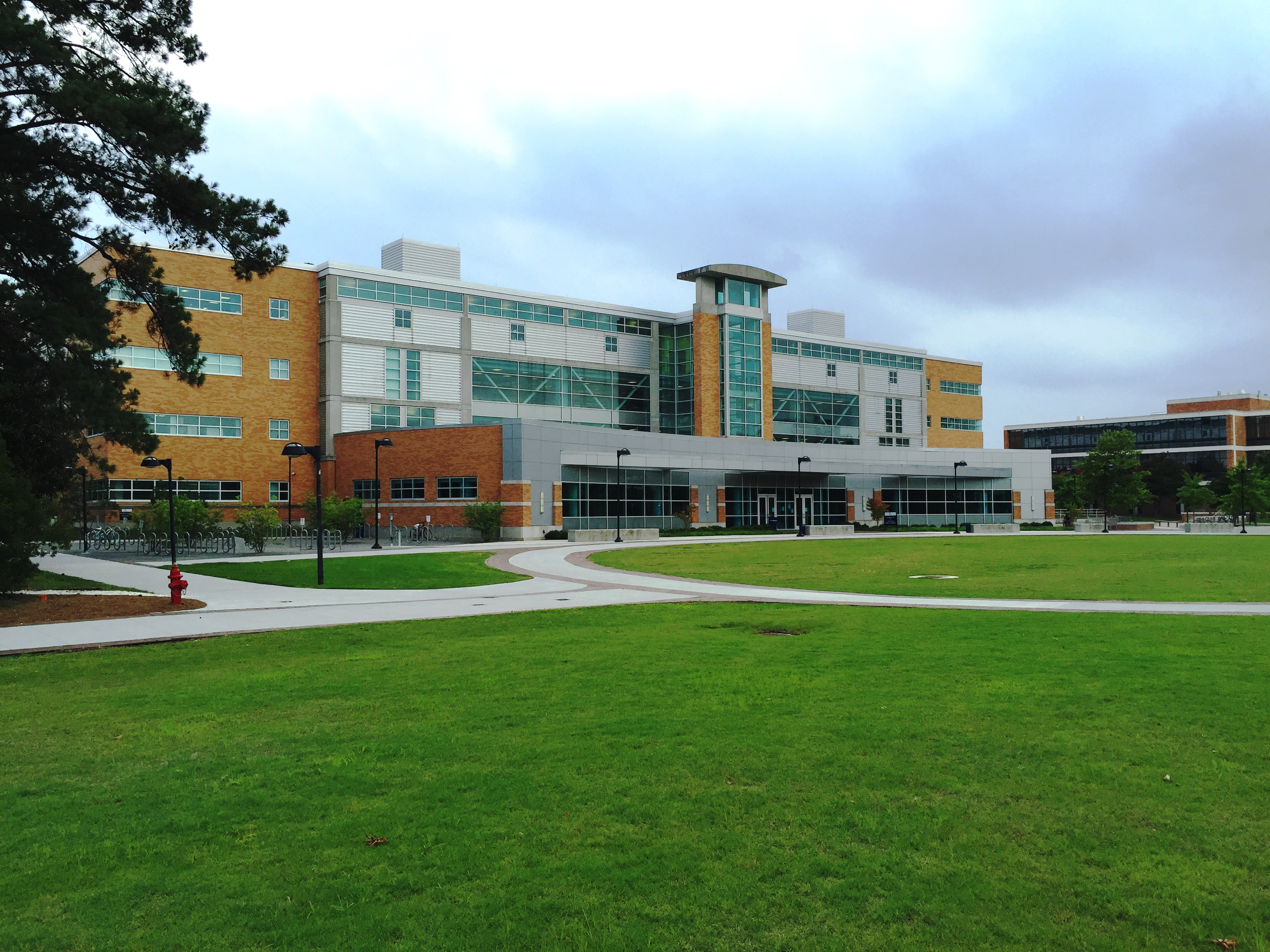
Perry Library

The Norfolk campus is the main campus for Old Dominion University. It is situated between two rivers – Elizabeth River to the west and Lafayette River to the east, approximately five miles (8.0 km) north of downtown Norfolk. The campus is situated between three historic neighborhoods: Larchmont, Lambert's Point, and Highland Park. The Norfolk campus houses undergraduate and graduate programs, residence halls, dining facilities, and athletic facilities.

==== Williamsburg Lawn ====
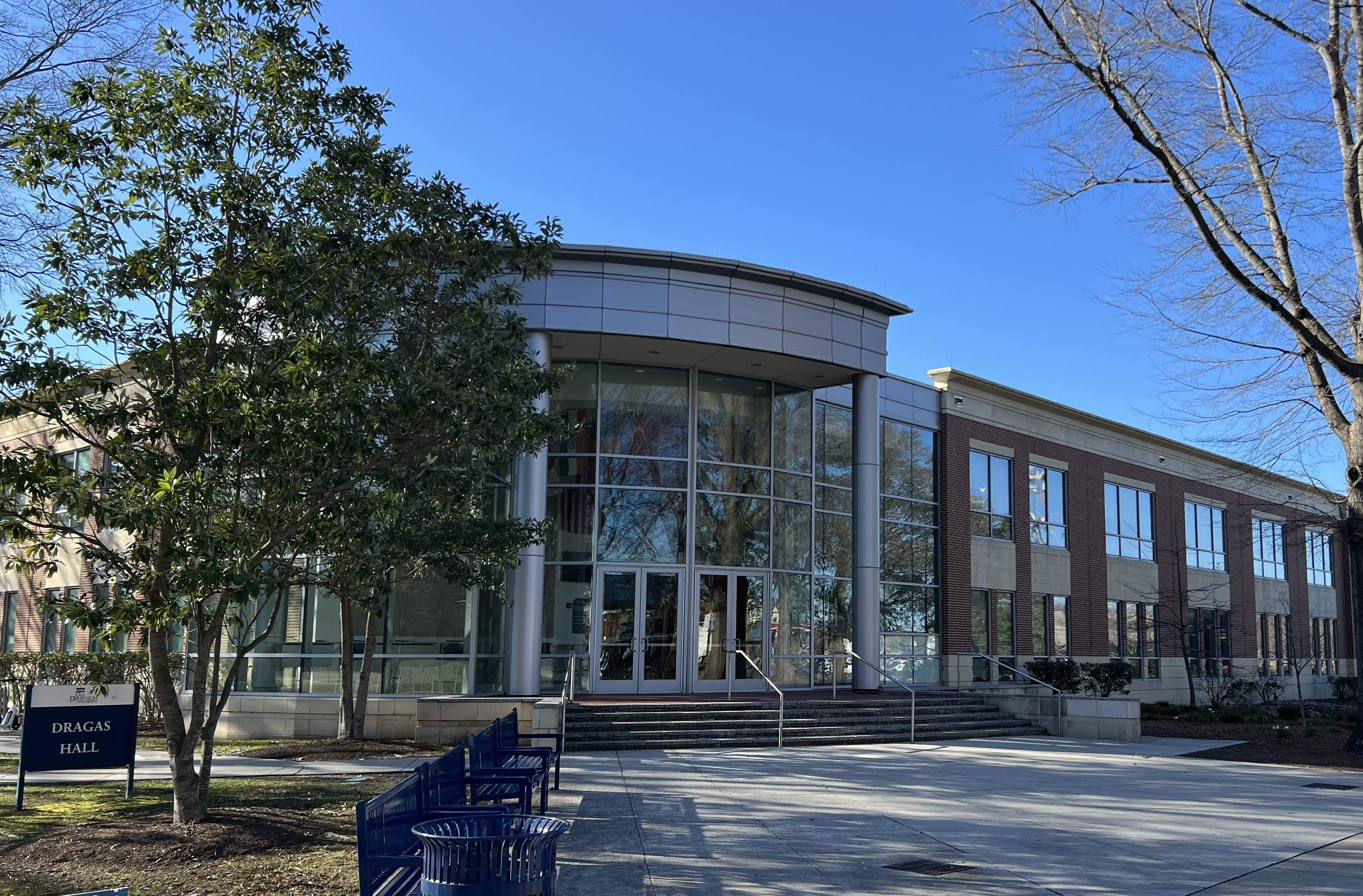
Dragas Hall

The Williamsburg Lawn is the oldest part of campus. The original buildings on campus, including Rollins Hall and Spong Hall, are located here.

==== Kaufman Mall ====
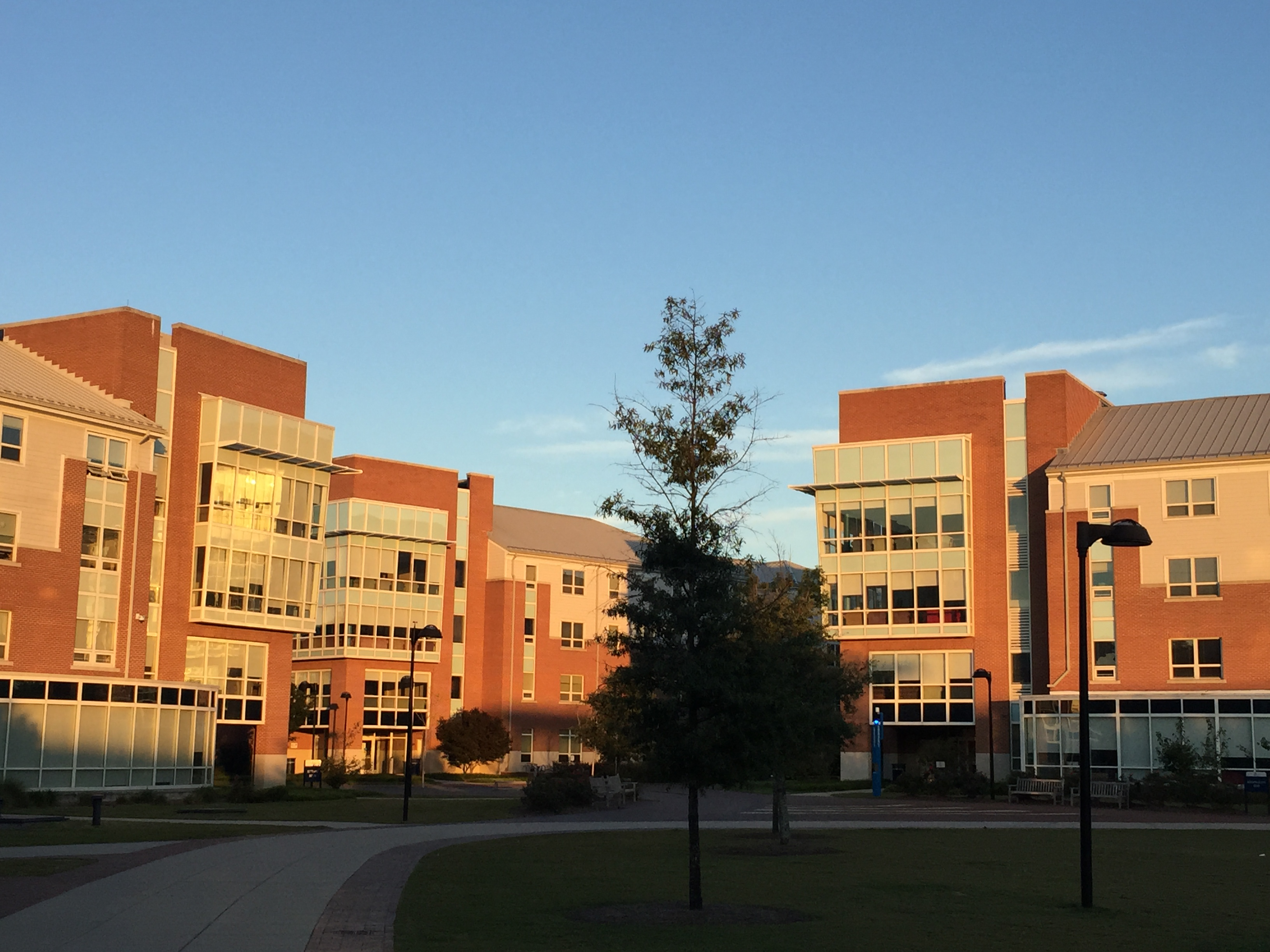
Dormitories on the Runte Quad

Constant Hall (Stome College of Business), Dragas Hall (College of Arts and Letters), Monarch Hall (College of Engineering and Technology, School of Cybersecurity), Kaufman Hall (College of Engineering and Technology), and Webb Center (Student Union) are situated around Kaufman Mall.

==== Runte Quad ====
The Runte Quad is a collection of seven new residential buildings—Ireland House (2006), Virginia House (2007), Scotland House (2008), France House (2009), England House (2009), Dominion House (2009), Owens House (2020). Owens House is designed to integrate living and learning. Most of the 470 beds are occupied by cybersecurity, entrepreneurial, and STEM-H students, those majoring in science, technology, engineering, math, and health sciences. Constructed alongside the Quad is the new Student Recreation Center (SRC), the Student Health Center, and Broderick Dining Commons.

==== University Village ====
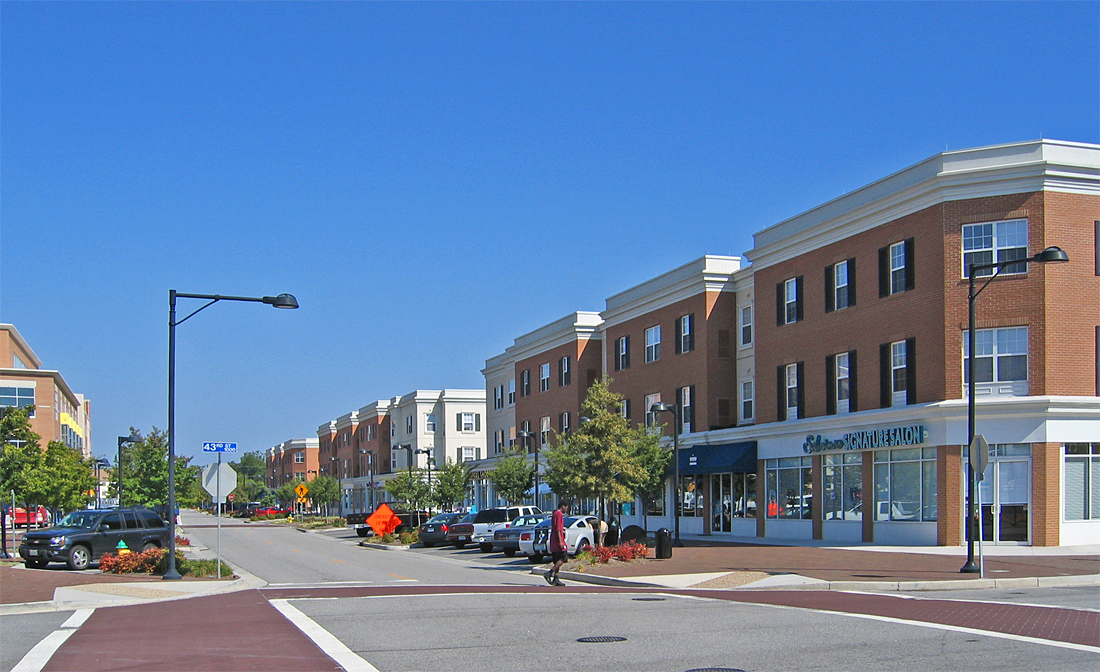
University Village

University Village is located to the east of Hampton Blvd on the Norfolk Campus. Established in 1995, the ODU Real Estate Foundation has led the development of University Village, a mixed-use development including retail, residential, and office buildings. Over the years, University Village has grown to include: Ted Constant Convocation Center, University Village Student Apartments, Innovation Research Park, Marriott SpringHill Suites Hotel, University Village Bookstore, University Fitness Center, Barry Arts Building, Hixon Art Studio, Barry Art Museum, Gordon Art Galleries, University Theatre, Goode Theatre, along with several restaurants and shops.

==== Maglev ====
The campus once housed a maglev research project, but it never ended up fully functional. The guideway could have been seen running across campus from Powhatan Avenue to the Convocation Center before it was demolished in 2023. There is a remaining segment that goes over Hampton Boulevard.

==== New and planned facilities ====
ODU has expanded its sports facilities, recently completing the Folkes-Stevens Indoor Tennis Center and the Powhatan Sports Complex, a 48,000-square-foot (4,500 m^{2}) facility that houses the intercollegiate athletic programs of field hockey, women's lacrosse, and football. In 2017, the Mitchum Basketball Performance Center, a practice facility for the ODU basketball teams, was built as an addition to the Ted Constant Convocation Center (Chartway Arena). In 2019, Old Dominion University's historic Foreman Field was torn down and replaced with the new football stadium, SB Ballard Stadium. In 2021, planning and fundraising was started for the $20 million renovation of the Baseball Complex. Among the new/renovated academic facilities are Constant Hall (Home of the Strome College of Business), Batten Arts and Letters Building, the Perry Library Student Success Center and Learning Commons, the E.V. Williams Engineering and Computational Sciences Building, and the Engineering Systems Building.

In 2016, the new Education Building was opened, as well as a new 45,000 square foot student dining facility, named Broderick Dining Commons.

In 2022, the university initiated plans to build a new Biology Building (scheduled to open in 2026), and to renovate the ODU Inn into the new ODU Police Building.

In 2023, the new Student Health & Wellness Center will open. The facility is attached to the Student Recreation Center, along the Runte Quad.

=== ODU Virginia Beach ===
Old Dominion University has a satellite campus in Virginia Beach, known as the ODU Virginia Beach Center. Located in the Princess Anne area of Virginia Beach, It offers a range of undergraduate and graduate programs. The ODU Virginia Beach Center offers an array of amenities including a Learning Commons for students, a study lounge, and space for special events.

ODU is expanding its Virginia Beach campus to Town Center, set to open in 2023.

=== ODU Tri-Cities Center ===
Old Dominion University has a satellite campus in Portsmouth, VA, known as the ODU Tri-Cities Center. ODU Tri-Cities Center is a full-service facility offering upper-level undergraduate 300- and 400-level degree completion classes, graduate and certificate programs, admissions, registration, advising, and other student services for residents of Portsmouth, Chesapeake, Suffolk, and surrounding areas.

=== ODU Peninsula Center ===
Old Dominion University has a satellite campus in Hampton, VA, known as the ODU Peninsula Center. ODU Peninsula Center is a full-service facility offering upper-level undergraduate 300- and 400-level degree completion classes, graduate and certificate programs, admissions, registration, advising, and other student services for residents of Hampton, Newport News, Williamsburg, and surrounding areas.

== Student life ==
Undergraduate demographics as of Fall 2023
| Race and ethnicity | Total |
|---|---|
| White | 41% |
| Black | 32% |
| Hispanic | 11% |
| Two or more races | 7% |
| Asian | 5% |
| Unknown | 2% |
| International student | 1% |
Economic diversity
| Low-income (Note: The percentage of students who received an income-based federal Pell grant intended for low-income students.) | 37% |
| Affluent (Note: The percentage of students who are a part of the American middle class at the bare minimum.) | 63% |

=== Residence halls ===
ODU's current residence hall capacity is approximately 5,300 students across 4 neighborhoods on the Norfolk campus. All freshmen are guaranteed housing, 77% of freshmen and 24% of all undergraduate students live in university-owned or operated housing. A private, student-only apartment complex (Proximity at ODU) houses approximately 1,000 additional students on campus, in University Village.

=== Recreation ===
The Student Recreation & Well-Being Center (SRWC) is located in the middle of the ODU campus adjacent to the Rosane Runte Quad. The facility includes 15,000 sq. ft. Multi-Level Fitness Center with strength, cardio, and free-weights, indoor swimming pool, indoor running track, three-court gymnasium, multi-purpose court, three group exercise studios, cycling studio, three racquetball courts, pro shop, Outdoor Adventure and Rental Center, bike and skate shop and an indoor climbing wall. The SRWC field, a multi-purpose turf field, is located next to the SRWC building.

The ODU Outdoor Adventure program allows students to take organized trips and participate in activities such as hiking, mountain biking, camping, surfing, yoga, rock climbing, snowboarding, and skiing.

=== ROTC ===
The ODU Army ROTC battalion was established in September 1969 in the Darden College of Education. The first cadets were commissioned on July 4, 1971. In 2008, ODU was recognized as having the sixth-largest Army ROTC unit out of 262 programs found nationwide. In June 2018, Major Promotable Rhana S. Kurdi became the first female Professor of Military Science.

Navy ROTC program is run in conjunction with the neighboring campuses of Norfolk State University and Hampton University. The Hampton Roads Naval Reserve Officer Training Corps is one of the largest officer training battalions in the US, consisting of over 250 Sailors, Marines, and Midshipmen, with an above-average prior enlisted presence.

=== Student organizations ===
Old Dominion University recognizes over 300 student organizations with over 8,000 student members. These groups include professional organizations, honor societies, religious organizations, minority students, and groups for students with common interests and majors as well as a variety of traditional, multicultural, and professional sororities and fraternities. WODU serves the campus as a 100% student run multimedia studio hosting radio broadcasts, podcasts, gaming, and sports reporting. The Student Government Association has direct authority over student organizations.

The university's Monarch Marching Band (MMB) was put in place in response to the formation of the Old Dominion Monarchs football program. It was founded in the summer of 2008.

=== Campus ministries ===
ODU students can join campus ministries which are coordinated by the University Chaplain's Association (UCA). Ministries include the United Methodist, Baptist, Catholic, Episcopalian, Presbyterian and Lutheran denominationally sponsored ministries. InterVarsity Christian Fellowship has a presence at ODU and are members of the UCA. Each of these churches has a campus ministry presence at ODU, as does Hillel: The Foundation for Jewish Campus Life, and the Tidewater Islamic Center.

=== Greek life ===
Old Dominion has thirteen fraternities and eleven sororities.

== Rankings and reputation ==
For 2024–2025, WSJ/College Pulse ranked Old Dominion #501-600 out of U.S. universities while US News & World Report ranked the university #278 out of U.S. universities and #973 out of global universities.

== Athletics ==
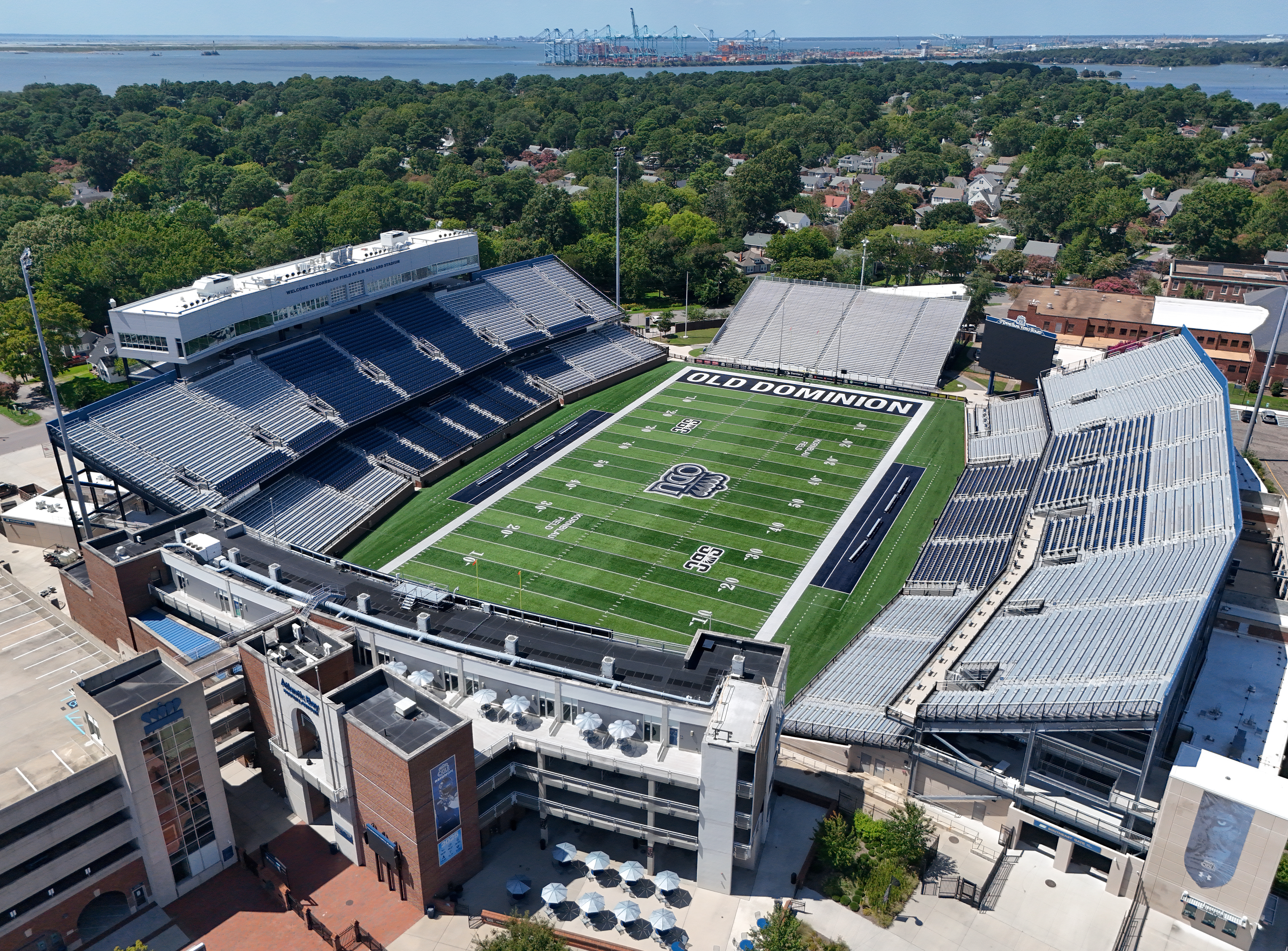
S.B. Ballard Stadium

Old Dominion's 18 athletic teams are known as the Monarchs and mostly compete in the NCAA Division I Sun Belt Conference (SBC). They have captured 28 team national championships and four individual titles.

The school's most nationally acclaimed sports team is the Lady Monarchs basketball team, who won three national championships in 1979 (AIAW), 1980 (AIAW) and 1985 (NCAA). The Lady Monarchs also made it to the 1997 Women's NCAA Championship Game, losing to Tennessee. ODU athletic teams have won 15 national championships in men's and women's sailing, and 9 national championships in women's field hockey. The Lady Monarchs' nine national titles in field hockey are the most in NCAA history.

In addition, Old Dominion's athletic teams have captured 51 conference championships in the Colonial Athletic Association, 7 conference championships in Conference USA, and 7 conference championships in the Sun Belt Conference.

On May 17, 2012, Old Dominion announced it would move to C-USA on July 1, 2013. Four ODU sports that are not sponsored by C-USA have outside affiliations. In 2013, the Wrestling team became an associate of the Mid-American Conference and the field hockey team joined the reconfigured Big East Conference. In 2020, ODU dropped wrestling. The women's lacrosse team spent the 2014 season (played in the 2013–14 school year) as an independent before joining the Atlantic Sun Conference. Finally, the women's rowing team joined the Big 12 Conference in 2014–15 after the Big 12 effectively took over C-USA rowing. Most recently, the men's swimming and diving team, which was left without a conference affiliation for two years because C-USA sponsors the sport only for women, joined the Coastal Collegiate Swimming Association, later renamed the Coastal Collegiate Sports Association, effective with the 2015–16 season. ODU joined the Sun Belt Conference on July 1, 2022.

== Notable faculty ==
- Robert L. Ash, Mechanical and Aerospace Engineering
- Mohammad Ataul Karim, Vice President for Research from 2004 to 2013
- Ingo Heidbrink, Professor of History
- Luisa Igloria, Professor in English (creative writing, poetry workshop, Asian American Literature), Filipina-American poet, 20th Poet Laureate of the Commonwealth of Virginia, emerita
- Mounir Laroussi, Electrical & Computer Engineering
- Bruce McDonald, Professor of Public Service
- Mark Mostert, Associate Professor of Special Education
- Janis Sanchez-Hucles, professor emerita in Psychology
- Janice Underwood, director of diversity initiatives from 2018 to 2019, first director of U.S. Office of Personnel Management's Office of Diversity, Equity, Inclusion, and Accessibility from 2022 to 2024
- G. William Whitehurst, dean of students from 1963 to 1968, Congressman in the US House of Representatives from 1969 to 1987, Professor of History and Kaufman Lecturer of Public Affairs from 1987 to 2020
