= Robert Ash (engineer) =

American aerospace engineer

Robert Lafayette Ash is a Professor of Mechanical & Aerospace Engineering and an Eminent Scholar at Old Dominion University in Norfolk, Virginia.

== Early life and education ==
In 1968, Ash graduated from Tulane University in New Orleans with a PhD in Mechanical and Aerospace Engineering, and in 1963, he graduated from Kansas State University with a Bachelor of Science in Mechanical Engineering. Ash's father-in-law was Lewis Webb Jr., who served as the first president of Old Dominion University.

His research interests include vortical flows, non-equilibrium phenomena, space systems, and Mars resources.

== Publications ==
His most cited papers are:

- Bushnell, D. M., Hefner, J. N., and Ash, R. L. (1977). "Effect of Compliant Wall Motion on Turbulent Boundary Layers. presented at the I.U.T.A.M. Symposium on Structure of Turbulence and Drag Reduction, Physics of Fluids, 20 (10 part 11), (pp. S31-S58)." (cited 170 times according to Google Scholar)
- Khorrami, M. R., Malik, M. R., and Ash, R. L. (1989). "Application of Spectral Collocation Techniques to the Stability of Swirling Flows." Journal of Computational Physics, 81, (pp. 206–229).(cited 150 times, according to Google Scholar)
- Ash, R. L., Dowler, W. L., and Varsi, G. (1978). "Feasibility of Rocket Propellant Production on Mars." Acta Astronautica, 5, (pp. 705–724). (cited 100 times, according to Google Scholar)

Groundbreaking for the era published and notable yet, Dr. Ash's In-Situ Resource Utilization (ISRU) paper, authored in 1978 as a visiting Old Dominion University (ODU) Senior Research Scientist at JPL, was the first instance of NASA research into ISRU production of liquid methane-based rocket propellants for a long-duration crewed missions to Mars' surface and return strategy. As initial detailed work of this type, it directly inspired "Mars Direct" and "Mars Semi-Direct" approaches in the following decades, although NASA shifted focus and fiscal resources to LEO and the ISS soon thereafter, versus continuing Moon-to-Mars exploration. As Mars exploration becomes more widely accepted, with the popular examples of SpaceX, Inspiration Mars, and Mars One, the trailblazing work of Dr. Robert "Bob" Ash, and those that followed, like Dr. Robert Zubrin (and others) beginning in the early 1990s, pioneered the difficult task of showing ISRU's benefits for long-duration, deep space and interplanetary surface exploration. Use of ISRU is now considered central to the feasibility of any mission to Mars or beyond, and remains an area of very active research.
