= Politicks =

American band

- Origin: Washington, DC, United States
- Genres: Rock, Soul, Alternative
- Years active: 2001–current
- Label: Brokn Records
- Members: Matthew Green; Brian Chafin; Mike Trella; Brendan McCourt; Bobby McCullough
- Past members: William Waikart; Tom McEvoy; Brad Moore
- Website: http://politicksband.com

Politicks is an American five-piece eclectic rock band formed in 2001 at Radford University where three of its current members went to school. Politicks has performed on the east coast from New York to Florida and shared the stage with several Grammy Award winning artists.

Last summer Politicks performed with soul and hip hop artists including Al Green, Lauryn Hill, The Roots, and India.Arie. In the fall they joined the Heineken Red Star Soul tour, performing with major artists in soul and R&B including Raphael Saadiq, Floetry, Raheem DeVaughn, Chrisette Michele, Claudette Ortiz, and Ryan Toby (City High). Politicks brought in 2007 with the Sugar Hill Gang, Pat McGee band and DC101 at the Downtown Countdown NYE event in Washington, DC.

While working on their professional debut album, Two Coffees, One Juice, the band wrote and recorded the theme song for a major motion picture, entitled "The Perfect Game."

Politicks features Matthew Green on vocals, Brian Chafin and Mike Trella on guitars, Brad Moore on bass, and Brendan McCourt on drums. All five members contribute to the songwriting process.

Notable venues outside Washington in which Politicks has performed include Nokia Theatre on Broadway in New York City; Theatre of Living Arts (TLA) in Philadelphia, Pennsylvania; Rusty Rudder in Dewey Beach, Delaware; and Meyer Amphitheatre in West Palm Beach, Florida.

The band has been known to contribute to benefit concerts including one for victims of Hurricane Katrina and another benefiting Washington, DC's Whitman-Walker Clinic.

Politicks has two tracks on OnTap's 2006 CD compilation On The Verge – Local Music Worth a Listen: Vol. 1.
