= 1987 Virginia ballot measures =

The 1987 Virginia State Elections took place on Election Day, November 3, 1987, the same day as the elections to the Virginia House of Delegates and the Virginia Senate, which are always held in off-years. The only statewide election on the ballot was one referendum, which was referred to the voters by the Virginia General Assembly.

== Question 1 ==
This referendum asked voters to approve the creation of a state-sponsored lottery. The revenue generated would be controlled by the Virginia General Assembly.

Question 1
Choice	Votes	%
For	791,518	56.56
Against	607,884	43.44
Total	1,399,402	100.00
Source: - Official Results
