= Virginia Lottery =

State lottery in Virginia, United States

Agency overview
- Formed: 1987
- Type: Independent
- Headquarters: 600 E. Main Street, Richmond, VA 23219
- Motto: Giving Back to Virginia Public Schools
- Minister responsible: Kevin Hall, Executive Director
- Parent agency: Commonwealth of Virginia
- Website: www.valottery.com

The Virginia Lottery is an independent agency of the Commonwealth of Virginia. It was created in 1987 when Virginians voted in a statewide referendum in favor of a state lottery. The first ticket was sold on September 20, 1988. All profits from Virginia Lottery ticket sales go to K–12 public education, as required by Virginia's constitution. In Fiscal Year 2026, the lottery's profits totaled more than $914 million, accounting for approximately 10 percent of school funding in Virginia. That brought total lottery profits in Virginia (from 1989 through June 2026) to more than $18.2 billion.

Daily draw games include Pick 3, Pick 4 and Pick 5, which are drawn twice daily, and Cash 5; with one drawing a day. The Virginia Lottery also offers numerous scratchers. It is one of 46 lotteries which sells Mega Millions tickets, and one of 47 offering Powerball. Cash4Life is nightly; Mega Millions is drawn Tuesdays and Fridays, while Powerball is drawn Mondays, Wednesdays and Saturdays. Bank A Million is also drawn Wednesdays and Saturdays. The lottery maintains elaborate security procedures to protect the integrity of its games.

The lottery's headquarters is in downtown Richmond. Customer service centers are located in Abingdon, Farmville, Hampton, Harrisonburg, Henrico, Roanoke, and Woodbridge.

== History ==
Lotteries date back to the earliest days of Virginia. "The Great Virginia Lottery" was held long before Virginia became a state. It began in 1612 to help raise funds for the struggling Jamestown Settlement; it raised £29,000 for the Virginia Company. Although it was a vital part of the colony's survival, tickets for the lottery were sold in England, since Virginia was wilderness at the time. Over the years, proceeds from lotteries helped establish early universities (including Virginia's College of William and Mary and University of Virginia), churches, libraries and public works projects.

Virginia voters approved a government-run lottery in 1987. Before the vote, supporters of a lottery suggested a number of possible ways in which lottery profits could be designated in Virginia, such as education, transportation and Chesapeake Bay cleanup. However, the referendum made no designation of how lottery profits would be spent. Sales began September 20, 1988. In 1989, the General Assembly directed lottery proceeds to capital construction projects. From 1990 to 1998, the proceeds went to Virginia's General Fund. Starting in 1999, a provision in Virginia's budget called for all proceeds to be assigned exclusively to education. In November 2000, Virginia voters approved the creation of the State Lottery Proceeds Fund by an 83.5-point margin. The measure, which is a permanent part of Virginia's Constitution, directs the General Assembly to use all lottery profits for educational purposes. The lottery does not control how its profits are spent.

Under Virginia law, all unclaimed prizes go to the Virginia Literary Fund, which is also used for educational purposes. As of 2026 more than $411 million in unclaimed prizes have been transferred to the Literary Fund.

The largest win in the Virginia Lottery's history to date occurred on June 27, 2025, when a Mega Millions jackpot worth $348 million was won with a ticket bought in Burgess, Virginia. The prize was claimed by an anonymous winner who told Lottery officials the first thing they would buy is a zero-radius riding lawn mower. Ten Mega Millions jackpots and two Powerball jackpot have been won in Virginia.

== Governance ==
The lottery is an independent agency, separate from the other branches of government. The lottery is headed by an executive director, who is appointed by the governor. Kevin Hall was appointed as the lottery's executive director by Gov. Abigail Spanberger in June 2026. He previously held the position from 2018-2022. The department is governed by a seven-member board, with each member appointed by the governor to serve a five-year term.

In fiscal year 2026, lottery sales were nearly $6.36 billion. The lottery generated more than $914 million for public education, more than $5 billion went back to players as prizes, and more than $128 million was earned by retailers as sales commissions.

The lottery has a number of programs highlighting its connection to education in the commonwealth. This includes the "Thank a Teacher" program, in which Virginians are encouraged to send specially designed thank-you cards to their favorite public school teachers statewide. The artwork on each card, both hard-copy and digital, is designed by three Virginia public school students: one elementary, one middle school and one high school.

== Games ==
The Virginia Lottery gives top-prize winners of certain games a choice of cash or annuity. When a Virginia top-prize winner of Mega Millions, Powerball or Cash4Life is claimed, the lottery purchases sufficient U.S. Government bonds to cover the prize. (A cash option winner of Mega Millions or Powerball receives the "lump sum" in two installments as both games are offered by multiple lotteries.) The actual cash value depends on the market value of the bonds on the date they are sold. Federal laws require the lottery to withhold Federal Income Tax on all prizes (whether lump sum or annuity) over $5,000.

Virginia Lottery sales are conducted by licensed retail businesses which receive a commission. Under state law, debit cards can be used to purchase lottery tickets, but not credit cards. Players can also play several games online via the Virginia Lottery's website, www.valottery.com. Games offered online include Mega Millions, Powerball, Cash4Life, Pick 3, Pick 4, Cash 5 with EZ Match and several digital-only games.

=== Virginia-only draw games ===
Within Virginia, the lottery offers "Pick 3", "Pick 4", "Pick 5", "Cash 5", "Bank a Million", "New Year's Millionaire Raffle", and "Keno".

==== Pick 3, Pick 4 and Pick 5 ====
Virginia offers three, four and five digit games that are similar to those of other US lotteries. All 3 of them are drawn twice daily, at 2PM and 11PM. The maximum prize on a single $1 play are $500 in Pick 3, $5,000 in Pick 4, and $50,000 in Pick 5.

Pick 3, Pick 4, and Pick 5 players can also add "Fireball" to their play. For double the normal ticket cost, an extra ball can provide additional winning combinations by substituting for any one of the other numbers. For example, a Pick 3 draw of 9-4-3 with a fireball of 0 allows for a wager to win a reduced prize with numbers of 0-4-3, 9-0-3, and 9-4-0 (or any arrangement thereof if Any Order is used).

==== Cash 5 with EZ Match ====
Virginia's Cash 5 with EZ Match game draws five numbers from 1 to 45. The minimum ticket cost is $1. The top prize is a parimutuel jackpot that starts at $200,000 and grows until there is a 5-of-5 winner. Players also win if they match 2, 3, or 4 numbers in any given position. Drawings are held on every night at 11 p.m. An additional "fast-play" element called EZ Match is available as an option (for an additional $1 per play). This will add numbers to be matched against the ticket for prizes up to $500.

==== Bank A Million ====
Bank A Million is a drawing game offering a top prize of $1,000,000 after the tax withholding. Drawings are held on Wednesdays and Saturdays. Players choose 6 of 40 numbers. The minimum bet is $2; however, players have the option of splitting the wager into two $1 plays or four 50-cent plays. The lottery draws six numbers plus a Bonus Ball. The top prize (matching the first six numbers) on a $2 wager is $1,000,000; however the top prize is "taxes paid" (the actual prize, $1,408,451, is before withholding, which is to be reported for tax purposes; the after withholding amount is $1,000,000.) Top prizes on $1 and 50-cent wagers are proportionally smaller.

==== Virginia's New Year's Millionaire Raffle ====
Virginia's New Year's Millionaire Raffle is offered by the lottery each year with a drawing on New Year's Day. The drawing that was held on January 1, 2026, featured five $1 million top prizes, seven $100,000 prizes and 1,000 prizes of $500 each. A total of 625,000 tickets were available for sale.

==== Keno ====
Keno is played like in many other lotteries and casinos. Players wager from $1 to $10 on 1 to 10 numbers of their choice out of a pool of 80 numbers for up to the next 20 drawings. The ticket they play applies to the next drawing(s), which occur at 4-minute intervals minus shutdown time for maintenance. Winnings depend on how many numbers were chosen, how many of those were matched, and the amount wagered, with a maximum prize of $1 million (by matching all the numbers in a 10-number $10 wager).

==== Cash Pop ====
Cash Pop is a drawing game based on the drawing of a single number from 1 to 15. Players can choose to wager on as many of the numbers as they wish for a given drawing, paying for each number covered. Each ticket has a base odds of 15-to-1, but the prize is different for each ticket, even for the same number; the higher the prize, the less likely it is to appear, with the top prize appearing on only 1 in 1000 tickets for a given number (for an overall winning odds of 15,000-to-1). Tickets played apply to the next drawing(s), which occur five times a day (at 9AM, noon, 5PM, 9PM, and just before midnight). Wagers for a given ticket can be $1, $2, $5, or $10, with the prizes scaling proportionally to the wager and a maximum prize of $2,500 (on a $10 wager).

=== Virginia's multi-state draw games ===
==== Cash4Life ====
Cash4Life is a drawing game currently offered in ten states, including Virginia. Tickets cost $2, and players pick 5 numbers from a pool of 60 and 1 "Cash Ball" number from a pool of 4. The top prize (for matching all numbers) is the choice of $365,000 a year for life or a $7,000,000 lump sum, subject to a liability limit (the original prize claim was for $1,000 a day but was changed in 2020 since, as a leap year, 2020 had 366 days). Drawings are held nightly at 9pm Eastern Time.

==== Mega Millions ====
Mega Millions is a drawing game played in Virginia and most other U. S. states (Virginia is one of the original six states to first offer the game in 1996 when it was known as "The Big Game"). Jackpots start at $50 million and grow with each drawing in which there is no jackpot winner. Drawings are held Tuesdays and Fridays. Players select five numbers, 1 through 70, plus a Mega Ball number, 1 through 24. A ticket matching all six numbers win the jackpot. The jackpot is pari-mutuel, meaning that if multiple tickets match all six numbers, each of them receives an equal share of the total jackpot. Mega Millions jackpot are offered as an annuity, although a cash option is also available.

The odds of matching all six numbers to win the Mega Millions jackpot are 1 in 290,472,336. The odds of winning any prize are 1 in 23.07. Ten Mega Millions jackpots have been won in Virginia.

==== Powerball ====
Powerball is a drawing game in which players try to match five numbers from 1 through 69, plus a Powerball number from 1 through 26. A ticket that matches all six numbers wins the jackpot. Jackpot amounts begin at $20 million and grow with each drawing in which the jackpot is not won. Top-prize Powerball winners can choose cash in lieu of annuity payments. The jackpot is pari-mutuel, meaning that if multiple tickets match all six numbers, each of them receives an equal share of the total jackpot. Drawings are held on Mondays, Wednesdays, and Saturdays.

A basic Powerball ticket costs $2. The Power Play option adds $1 to the price of each ticket in a given playslip, so a Powerball ticket with Power Play costs $3 (up from $2). The odds of matching all six numbers to win the Powerball jackpot are 1 in 292,201,338. The odds of winning any prize are 1 in 25. Two Powerball jackpots have been won in Virginia since the game first became available in the commonwealth in 2010.

=== Scratchers ===
From its inception, the Virginia Lottery has sold instant (scratcher) games. Originally, all scratch tickets were $1 each; in the mid-1990s, the first Bingo scratcher was introduced; each Bingo ticket cost $2. Eventually, higher-priced scratchers (including $3, $5, and $10) with larger prizes were introduced. Currently, the most expensive scratchers in common circulation are $30 each. All $30 currently in circulation and most $20 and $10 games offer a top prize of at least $1 million (annuitized). The highest prize offered in a scratcher is currently $10 million (annuitized): offered on select $30 games. Winners of scratcher annuity prizes of at least $1 million can choose cash (just as in the top prizes in Powerball, Mega Millions, or Cash4Life).

=== Print 'n Play ===
The lottery also offers Print 'n Play games. As with traditional lottery games, tickets are printed by the terminal; however as in scratchers, winning status are determined when the ticket is printed (there is no drawing). Originally called Fast Play with a continually-changing lineup of games at $2, $3, and $5 prices, each with its own rules and prizes, when it became Print 'n Play the lineup was simplified to the three most popular games—Bingo, Blackjack, and Crossword—and a new $10 tier was added for Bingo and Crossword. A $20 tier has recently been added along with a new game: Print 'n Play × (Times) the Money, based on a popular series of scratchers.

In addition, the lottery offers Print 'n Play Rolling Jackpot. Unlike the other Print n’ Play games, the top prize of this game is based on a rolling jackpot that builds over time. The game cam be played for $2, $5, or $10, with the top prize of each being 20%, 50%, and 100% of the jackpot, respectively. If a top prize is claimed, the jackpot is reduced accordingly and then, respectively, $10,000, $25,000, or $50,000 is added back in to ensure a minimum jackpot of $50,000 at any time.

== Online gaming ==
Many Virginia Lottery games can be played online, at the lottery’s website valottery.com or using the Virginia Lottery mobile app. This includes Mega Millions, Powerball, Cash4Life, Pick 3, Pick 4, Pick 5, Cash 5 with EZ Match and many instant-win games available online only. In order to play online, a person must be at least 18 years old and physically located in Virginia. Online sales began on July 1, 2020, the first day allowed under a change in state law that had previously banned online play. Within the first 12 months, online sales in Virginia surpassed $807 million. The Virginia Lottery also has a mobile app that provides players with drawing results, a ticket checker, and mobile playslips that can be scanned by retailers to make wagering easier.

== Security ==
Virginia Lottery drawings are conducted under elaborate security protocols. The set of balls used for each drawing are randomly selected from a number of sets; and detailed records of "test" drawings are maintained to prevent systematic biases. In addition, forging lottery tickets, or tampering with a lottery drawing is a Class 5 felony. All Virginia Lottery employees and applicants to become lottery sales agents are fingerprinted and subject to criminal background checks.

Theft of Virginia Lottery tickets are investigated by both the lottery investigators and local law enforcement agencies. Lottery Investigators are fully sworn law enforcement officers. Per Virginia law it vests the Director, the director of security, and investigators of the State Lottery Department with the powers of sheriffs in enforcing the statutes and regulations relating to the lottery.

== Compulsive gambling ==
The Virginia Lottery has an extensive and nationally recognized Play Responsibly program aimed at informing people about problem gambling and gambling addiction. The lottery works closely with the Virginia Council on Problem Gambling (VCPG) and is a member of the Virginia Partnership for Gaming and Health. Virginia law requires that each ticket include a telephone number for a counseling service that addresses compulsive gambling. That number links to the Virginia Problem Gambling Helpline, which is maintained the VCPG. The lottery also includes information on compulsive gambling on its website. and has produced Problem Gambling and Play Responsibly public service announcements for TV and radio. The lottery supports National Problem Gambling Awareness Month.

== See also ==
- Gambling
- Lotteries in the United States
