= Radford University =

Public university in Radford, Virginia, US

- Former names: State Normal and Industrial School for Women at Radford (1910–1924); State Teachers College at Radford (1924–1943); Women's Division of Virginia Polytechnic Institute (1943–1964); Radford College (1964–1979)
- Type: Public university
- Established: 1910; 116 years ago
- Accreditation: SACS
- Academic affiliations: SCHEV
- Endowment: $77.6 million (2025)
- President: Bret S. Danilowicz
- Provost: Bethany Usher
- Faculty: 433
- Students: 7,812 (Fall 2024)
- Undergraduates: 6,161
- Postgraduates: 1,651
- Location: Radford, Virginia, United States; 37.138274°N 80.551222°W
- Campus: 211 acres (0.85 km^{2}); Small suburb
- Newspaper: The Tartan
- Colors: Red, Blue & Gray
- Nickname: Highlanders
- Sporting affiliations: NCAA Division I – Big South
- Mascot: The Highlander
- Website: www.radford.edu

Radford University is a public university in Radford, Virginia, United States. It is one of the state's eight doctorate-granting public universities. Founded in 1910, Radford offers curricula for undergraduates in more than 100 fields; graduate programs including the M.F.A., M.B.A., M.A., M.S., Ed.S., Psy.D., and M.S.W.; and specialized doctoral programs in health-related professions. It is classified among "Doctoral/Professional Universities".

== History ==
The State Normal and Industrial School for Women at Radford was founded in Radford as a women's college in 1910. In 1924, the school was renamed the State Teachers College at Radford, with the primary intent of training teachers in the Appalachian region. In 1943, as part of the state's consolidation movement, the college merged with the Virginia Polytechnic Institute in nearby Blacksburg, serving as the women's campus for the then predominately male land-grant college. The merger was dissolved in 1964, and Radford College became coeducational in 1972. After a period of sustained and significant growth, Radford College was granted university status in 1979. In 2008, the Virginia General Assembly authorized three doctoral programs at Radford University, and the first doctorates were awarded in 2011.

=== Presidents ===
Radford University's president has been Bret S. Danilowicz since July 1, 2022. The university's administration is overseen by a 15-member board, whose members are appointed by the Governor of Virginia and serve four-year terms. Each year, the board also selects a student and a faculty member as advisory representatives.

Former presidents:

- John Preston McConnell, 1911–1937
- David Wilbur Peters, 1938–1951
- Charles Knox Martin Jr., 1952–1972, Chancellor, 1972–73, President Emeritus
- Donald Newton Dedmon, 1972–1994
- Douglas Covington, 1995–2005, President Emeritus
- Penelope Ward Kyle, 2005–2016, President Emeritus
- Brian Hemphill, 2016-2021
- Carolyn Ringer Lepre, (interim) 2021-2022

== Academics ==
Academic rankings

Master's
- Washington Monthly: 87

Regional
- U.S. News & World Report: 29

National
- Forbes: 465
- Washington Monthly: 105
- WSJ/College Pulse: 600-794

Radford University's undergraduate programs emphasize the liberal arts, business, sciences, and teacher education. The graduate and undergraduate programs in business administration offered by the College of Business and Economics are accredited by the Association to Advance Collegiate Schools of Business (AACSB).

The university has a student/faculty ratio of 14:1 and an average class size of 19.

More than 80% of faculty members hold doctorates or other terminal degrees (M.F.A., M.B.A., Ph.D., J.D., etc.) in their fields. Special programs include Study Abroad, Honors Academy, RU Connections freshmen living/learning communities, internships, co-ops, practical and service learning, Army ROTC, leading to commissions in the U.S. Army, and undergraduate research opportunities.

Radford University and Northern Virginia Community College signed a Guaranteed Transfer Partnership Agreement on August 28, 2017.

== Undergraduate and graduate colleges ==
The university is organized into seven undergraduate colleges and schools, and one graduate college:

- College of Humanities and Behavioral Sciences
- Davis College of Business and Economics
- College of Education and Human Development
- Waldron College of Health and Human Services
- Artis College of Science and Technology
- College of Visual and Performing Arts
- College of Nursing
- College of Graduate Studies and Research

The College of Graduate Studies and Research offers 18 degree programs in fields such as art, business, communication, counseling, criminal justice, education, English, music, nursing, occupational therapy, physical therapy, psychology, and social work. The State Council of Higher Education for Virginia has authorized three doctoral programs at Radford in counseling psychology, physical therapy, and nursing practice. The Doctor of Psychology (Psy.D.) program in counseling psychology admitted its first students in 2008. The doctorate in physical therapy program began in 2009. The first Doctor of Nursing Practice students began their studies in an online program in 2010.

== Campus and community ==
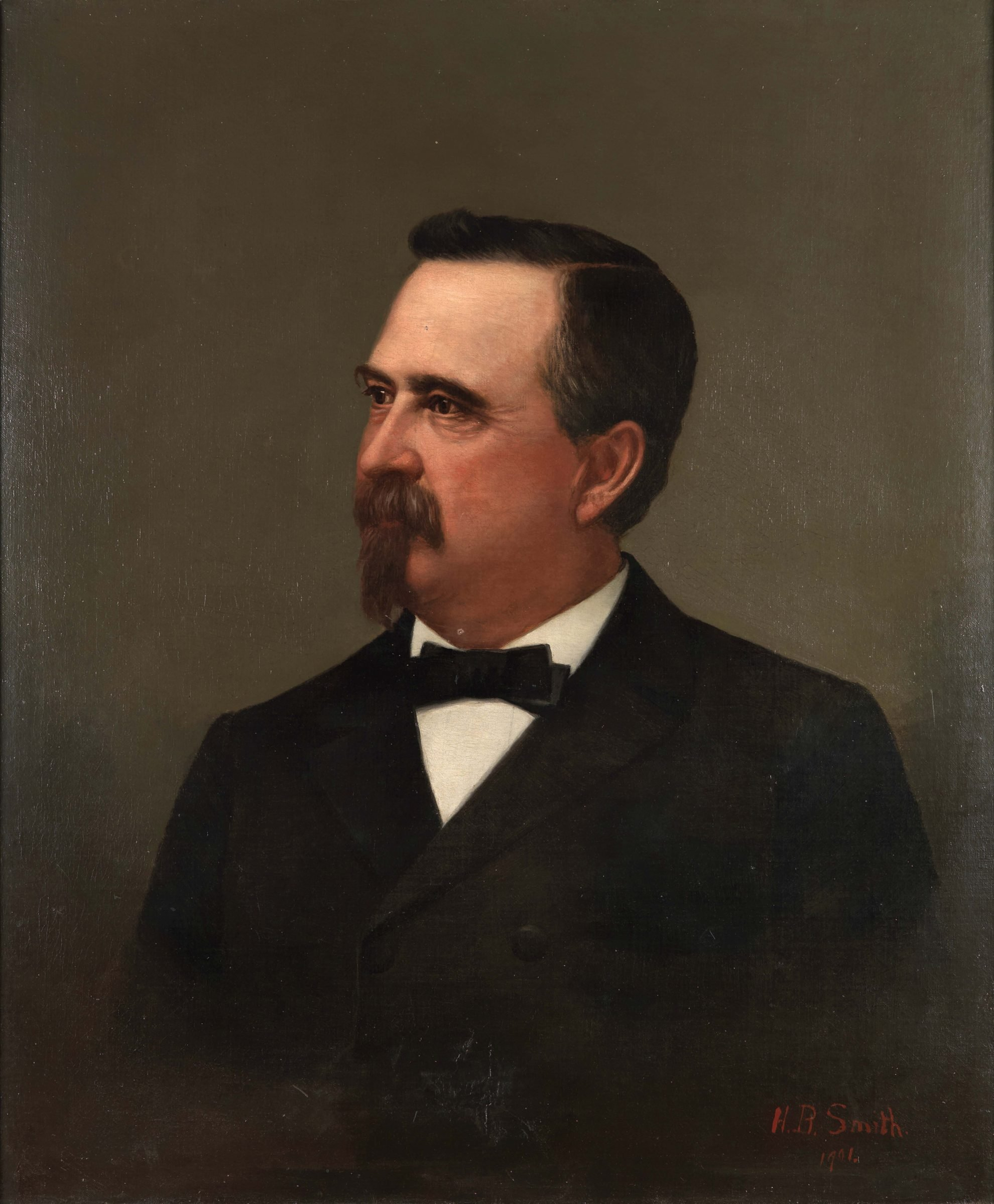
James Hoge Tyler was a Confederate soldier and Governor of Virginia. His home is next to Radford's campus and is the namesake of a residence hall and the main street of the campus.

Radford University has an 211 acres (0.85 km^{2}) campus in a residential area of Radford, Virginia. The town is in the Virginia Highlands, between the Blue Ridge and Allegheny mountains at a double bend in the New River. Nearly all of the 31 administrative, academic, student services, and residence halls, some built in a red-brick Georgian style, are on a main lawn, two quadrangles, and a pedestrian thoroughfare in a 76-acre (310,000 m^{2}) area, while a large adjoining area along the New River separated from the main campus by U.S. Route 11 and the Norfolk Southern railroad holds the university's athletic facilities, student parking lots, and student apartments. The university opened a COBE (College of Business and Economics) building in 2012. In 2014 a New Student Fitness Center opened. A new Center for Sciences opened in 2016. In fall 2017, the new CHBS (College of Humanities and Behavioral Sciences) building opened. As of 2016, nearly all Radford dorms have been renovated. Renovations are ongoing for several buildings.

Bordering the Little River, about five miles from campus is the Selu Conservancy, a 376-acre (1.52 km^{2}) reserve, observatory, retreat, and conference center owned by the University Foundation.

Radford University is also home to the Radford University Planetarium, a permanent planetarium with a 55-seat front-facing theater with a 10-meter dome and two floor-mounted 2k projectors running the Digistar 7 planetarium software. The planetarium is maintained by the physics department and primarily operated by work-study students. Shows run by students and professors are free of charge. Yearly attendance is about 6,000.

== Student life ==
Undergraduate demographics as of Fall 2023
Race and ethnicity	Total
White	66%
Black	14%
Hispanic	8%
Two or more races	5%
Unknown	3%
Asian	2%
International student	1%
Economic diversity
Low-income (Note: The percentage of students who received an income-based federal Pell grant intended for low-income students.)	36%
Affluent (Note: The percentage of students who are a part of the American middle class at the bare minimum.)	64%

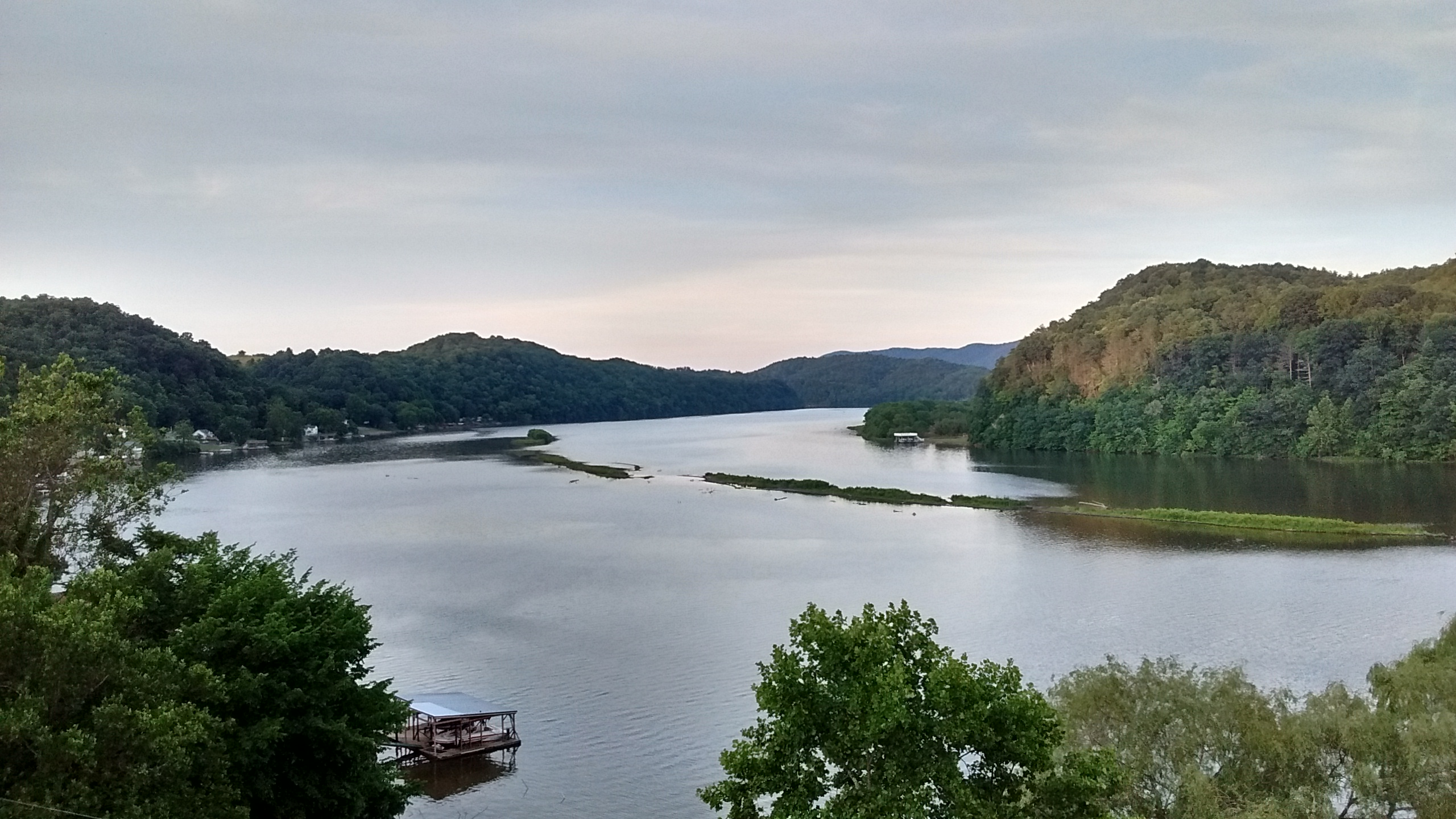
New River upstream from Radford

About 3,800 of Radford's students live on campus in 15 residence halls.

Radford has more than 250 student clubs and organizations. These range from service and honors organizations to performing arts and intramural sports. Radford is also home to Highlander Student Media (RUHSM), with various student media organizations, such as The Tartan (the student newspaper), Radio Free Radford, The Beehive (a yearbook/magazine), Exit 109 (a literary magazine), ROC-TV, a.k.a. "Radford On Camera" (the student TV station), and Whim (an online magazine).

Radford also has fraternities and sororities. More than 17 religious organizations are part of the Radford University Campus Ministers' Association (RUCMA). They hold religious events, masses, and ceremonies throughout the academic year.

== Athletics ==
The university's teams are known as the Highlanders (in honor of the region's Scots-Irish heritage) and compete in the Big South Conference. Radford offers 16 NCAA varsity sports for men and women. The Radford men's basketball team won the Big South Conference tournament in 1998, 2009, and 2018. Radford won the Big South Conference Men's Tennis Championship in 2007, 2008, and 2009, and the Big South Softball Championship in 2009.

The Radford baseball team won the Big South Conference Championship in 2015 and 2017. In 2015, it defeated the Chanticleers of Coastal Carolina with a walk-off single by Hunter Higgerson. The team finished with a 45–16 record. It was selected to compete in the Nashville Regional, where it went 2–2, with wins against Lipscomb University and Indiana University, before losing to the 2015 National Runner-up Vanderbilt University in the Regional Finals.

The Radford men's rugby club team won the Division II National Championship in 2003 and 2008.

Student athletes have exclusive use of the Dedmon Center, a recreational and convocation complex that opened in 1981. The Dedmon Center features a 1/6-mile indoor jogging track, a weight-training room, locker rooms, and several team rooms. The main arena features a basketball floor and a secondary volleyball arena for intercollegiate competition with four recreational courts for basketball or volleyball. Adjoining facilities include intramural soccer, football, softball fields, and intercollegiate fields and courts for baseball, softball, field hockey, and tennis. The Patrick D. Cupp Stadium adds an intercollegiate soccer, lacrosse, and track and field complex.

== Notable alumni ==
- Lynne Agee (born 1948) – women's college basketball coach with 600+ wins
- Belinda C. Anderson – 11th president of Virginia Union University
- Tal Bayer (born 1970) – rugby coach and musician
- Frank Beamer (born 1946) – college football coach
- Eddie Butler (born 1991) – professional baseball player
- Kiera Cass (born 1981) – author
- Javonte Green (born 1993) – professional basketball player
- Spencer Horwitz (born 1997) – professional baseball player
- Randal J. Kirk (born 1954) – founder of New River Pharmaceuticals and CEO of Intrexon
- Scott Long – human rights activist
- MaryLynn Magar – politician
- Nick Mayhugh – track & field gold medalist at the 2020 Summer Paralympics
- Jayma Mays – actress and singer
- Ryan Meisinger (born 1994) – professional baseball player
- Artsiom Parakhouski (born 1987) – professional baseball player
- Politicks – rock band
- Steve Robinson – college basketball coach
- Ross Scott (born 1982) – YouTuber and activist
- Marty Smith (born 1976) – television sports reporter
- Joseph R. Yost (born 1986) – politician
