= Vasile Goldiș Western University of Arad =

Private university in Romania

Coordinates: 46°22′19″N 22°07′49″E

"Vasile Goldiș" Western University of Arad
- Universitatea de Vest "Vasile Goldiș" din Arad
- Motto: Envolved in your education!
- Type: Private
- Established: 1990
- Affiliations: European University Association, Association of the Carpathian Region Universities, Association of Romanian Private Accredited Universities, Danube Rectors' Conference
- Rector: Coralia Adina Cotoraci
- Administrative staff: 375
- Students: 4500(2020–2021)
- Undergraduates: 43 bachelor programs
- Postgraduates: 26 masterate programs
- Doctoral students: 2 Doctoral Schools
- Location: Arad, Arad, Romania
- Campus: The new Vasile Goldiș Campus, The Medical Faculty Campus, Botanical Garden Macea Campus, others scattered in the city of Arad
- Colours: White and blue
- Website: www.uvvg.ro

University rankings

Regional – Overall
- QS Emerging Europe and Central Asia: 301-350 (2022)

"Vasile Goldiș" Western University of Arad (Romanian: Universitatea de Vest "Vasile Goldiș") is a private university located in Arad, Romania.

The spiritual patron of the university is Vasile Goldiș, a prominent Romanian politician, pedagogue, publicist, member of the Romanian Academy and a key figure of the Union of Transylvania with Romania in 1918. Subsequent to the union he was a member of the Ion I. C. Brătianu, Artur Văitoianu and Alexandru Averescu cabinets and a deputy in the Romanian Parliament. After his withdrawal from politics he dedicated himself to educational and cultural activities. Between 1923 and 1932, he was the president of the ASTRA society.

== History ==
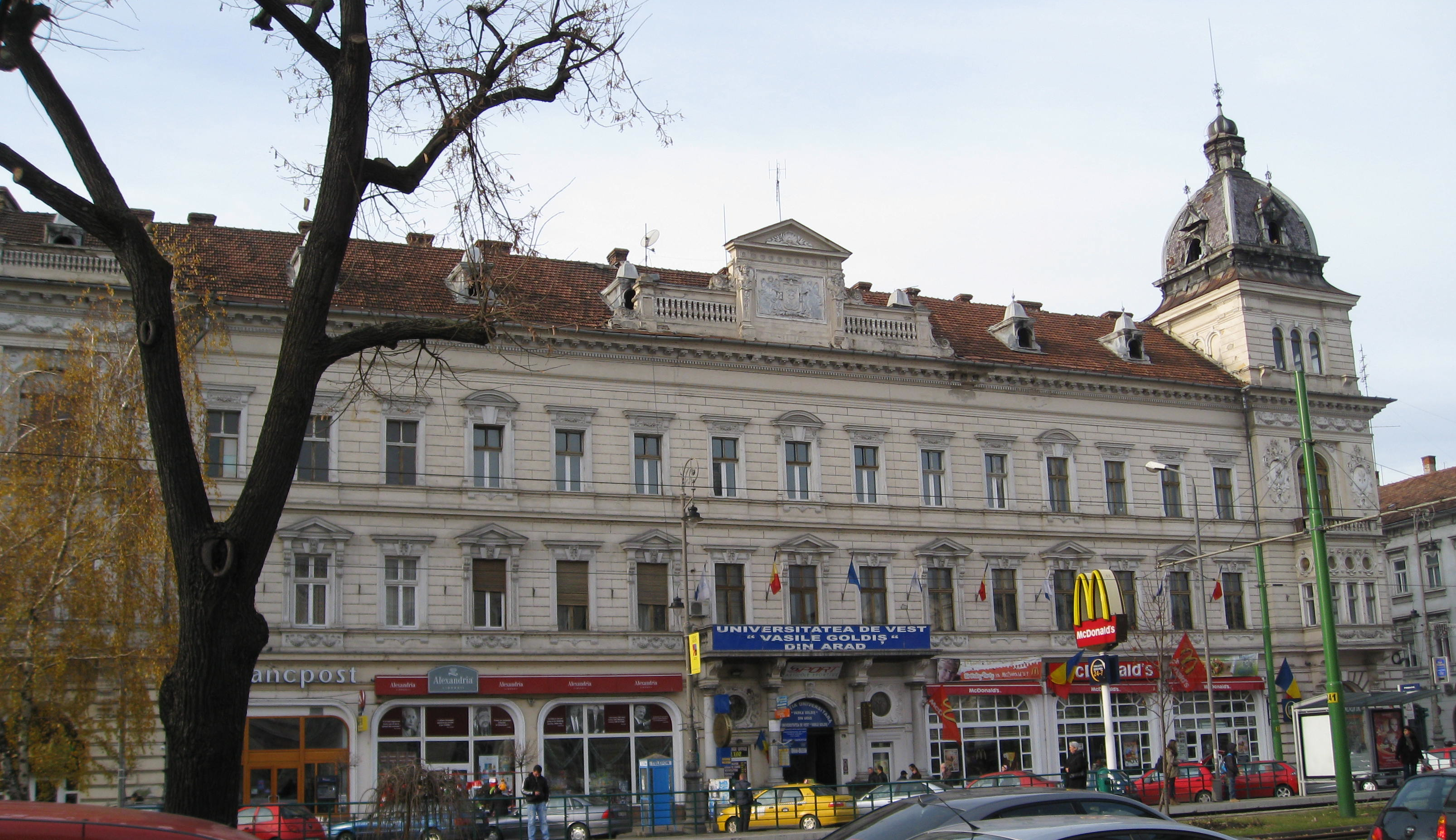
Main building of the university

The Vasile Goldiș Western University was founded in 1990 with only two faculties at the time: Law and Marketing, Management and Computer Sciences. Subsequently, to the development of the university new faculties appeared completing the initial two. So in 1991 appeared the Faculty of Dentistry, the Faculty of Medicine in 1992, and the Faculty of Physical Training and Sport in 1993. Nowadays the university has branches in Satu Mare, Baia Mare, Zalău, Marghita, Sebis.

The university is a signatory of the 1999 Bologna Process Charter.

== Academics ==
Structure of the VGWU

- Faculty of Law
- Faculty of Economics, Information Technology and Engineering
- Faculty of Medicine
- Faculty of Pharmacy
- Faculty of Dentistry
- Faculty of Humanities, Physical Education and Sport

Other academic structures

- Macea University Botanical Garden
- Institute of Life Sciences

VGWU establishes itself on a yearly programme separated in two semesters, fall and spring.

== Management ==
- Coralia A. Cotoraci - rector
- Petru Darau – deputy rector
- Anca Hermenean – deputy rector
- Cristian Bente – deputy rector
- Andrei Anghelina – deputy rector
- Paul Freiman - president of Senate

== Research ==
The university is organized in 6 faculties. Auxiliary to the academic structure, the university developed a system of supporting structures for research and innovation.
