= Fâneața Mare =

- Location within Romania

Location
- Country: Romania
- Counties: Bihor County
- Villages: Șușturogi, Uileacu de Munte, Paleu, Biharia, Satu Nou, Tămășeu

Physical characteristics
- Mouth: Barcău
  - location: Tămășeu
  - coordinates: 47.2392°N 21.9274°E
- Basin size: 114 km^{2} (44 sq mi)

Basin features
- Progression: Barcău→ Crișul Repede→ Körös→ Tisza→ Danube→ Black Sea

The Fâneața Mare is a left tributary of the river Barcău in Romania. It discharges into the Barcău in Tămășeu. Its basin size is 114 km^{2} (44 sq mi).
