= Făncica =

- Location within Romania

Location
- Country: Romania
- Counties: Bihor County
- Villages: Sălacea, Buduslău, Albiş, Crestur, Făncica

Physical characteristics
- Source: Sălacea
- Mouth: Barcău
  - location: Downstream of Sânlazăr
  - coordinates: 47.2970°N 22.2279°E
- Length: 25 km (16 mi)
- Basin size: 100 km^{2} (39 sq mi)

Basin features
- Progression: Barcău→ Crișul Repede→ Körös→ Tisza→ Danube→ Black Sea

The Făncica is a right tributary of the river Barcău in Romania. It discharges into the Barcău near the village Făncica. Its length is 25 km (16 mi) and its basin size is 100 km^{2} (39 sq mi).
