= Barcău =

Barcău Berettyó
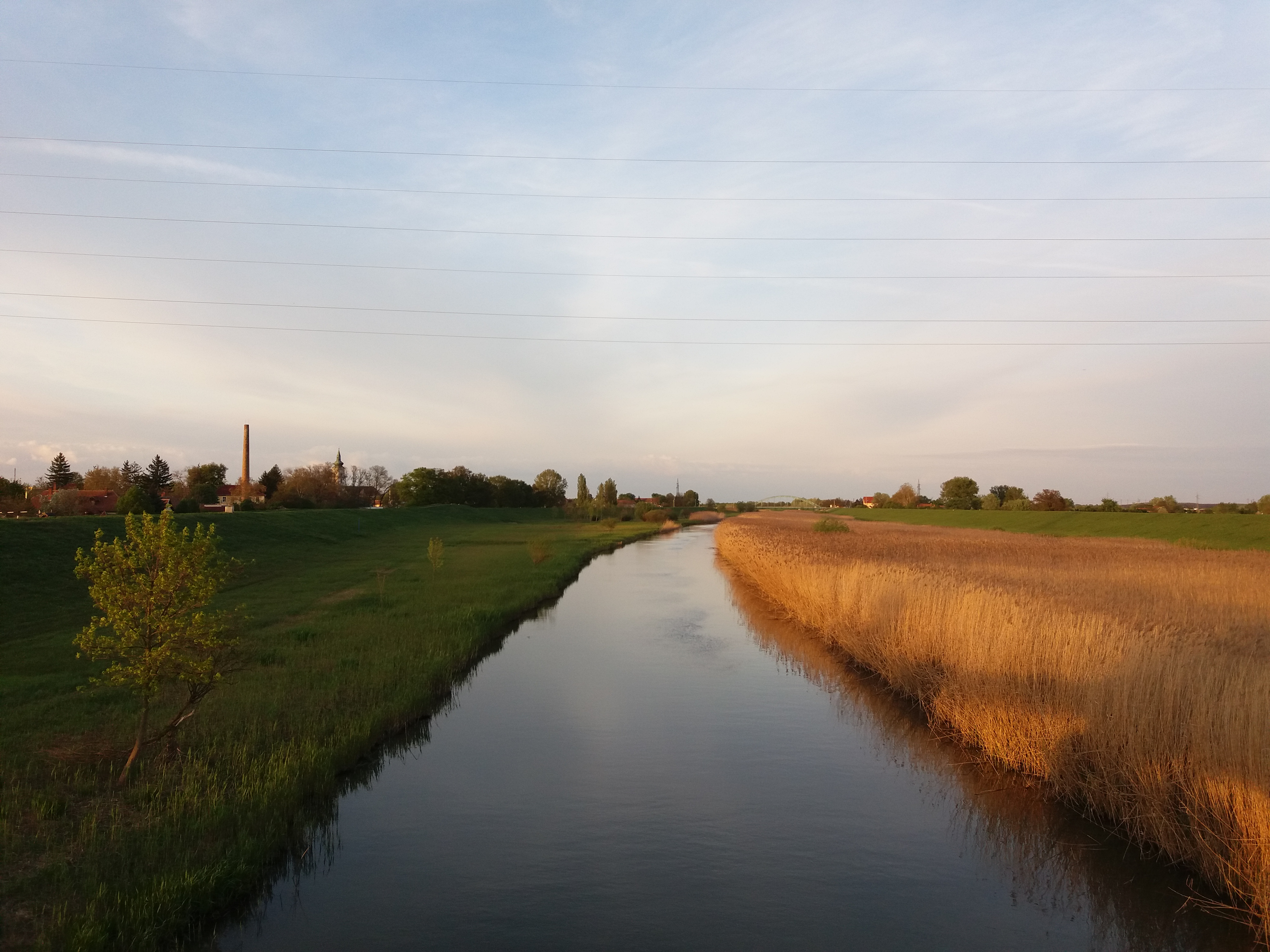
- Berettyó in Hungary

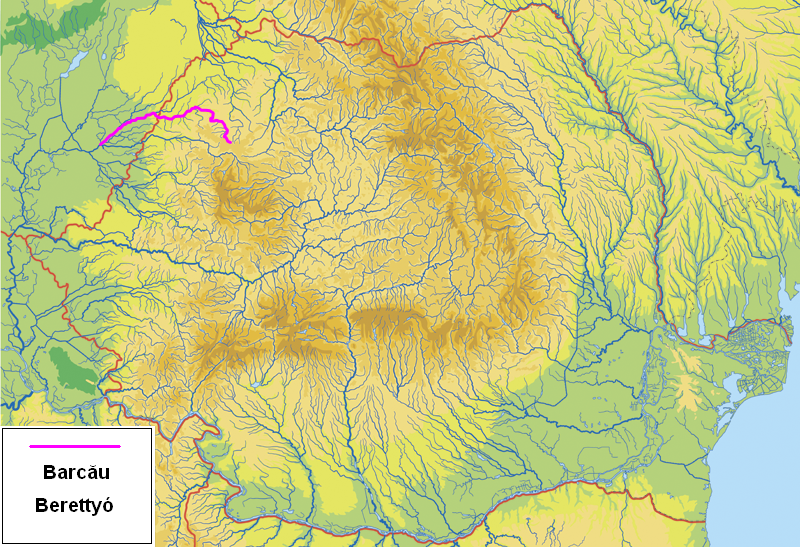

Location
- Countries: Romania and Hungary
- Counties: Romania: Sălaj; Bihor; Hungary: Hajdú-Bihar; Békés
- Towns: Marghita; Berettyóújfalu

Physical characteristics
- Source: Plopiș Mountains
  - location: near Boghiș, Sălaj County, Romania
- Mouth: Crișul Repede
  - location: near Szeghalom, Békés County, Hungary
  - coordinates: 46°59′0″N 21°7′25″E
- Length: 167 km (104 mi)
- Basin size: 5,812 km^{2} (2,244 sq mi)

Basin features
- Progression: Crișul Repede→ Körös→ Tisza→ Danube→ Black Sea
- Tributaries
  - right: Ier

The Barcău or Bereteu (Romanian or Berettyó in Hungarian) is a river which has its origin in Sălaj County, Romania. It is about 167 kilometres (104 mi) long with a watershed area of 5,812 km^{2} (2,244 sq mi). After crossing Bihor County in Romania and Hajdú-Bihar and Békés County in Hungary, it flows into the Sebes-Körös (Romanian: Crișul Repede) near Szeghalom. Its length in Romania is 134 km (83 mi).

The upper reach of the Barcău, upstream of the junction with the Răchita is locally called the Ștei, Berchesei or Bărcașu. The reach between the junctions with the Răchita and the Toplița is locally known as the Tusa. The name Barcău is only used following its confluence with the Toplița.

== Towns and villages ==
The following towns and villages are situated along the river Barcău, from source to mouth: in Romania: Valcău de Jos, Boghiș, Nușfalău, Ip, Suplacu de Barcău, Balc, Abram, Marghita, Abrămuț, Chișlaz, Sălard, Tămășeu, in Hungary Kismarja, Pocsaj, Gáborján, Berettyóújfalu, Szeghalom.

== Tributaries ==
The following rivers are tributaries to the river Barcău (from source to mouth):

- Left: Valea Răchitelor, Toplița, Iaz, Valea Mare, Groapa, Cerăsei, Marca, Borumlaca, Săldăbagiu, Bistra, Valea Albă, Tria, Valea Fânețelor, Almaș, Valea Vițeilor, Fâneața Mare, Crișul Mic
- Right: Comăneasa, Ip, Camăr, Curătura, Dijir, Inot, Cheț, Valea Lacului, Făncica, Sânnicolau, Roșiori, Ier
