= Oradea metropolitan area =

- Metropolitan area
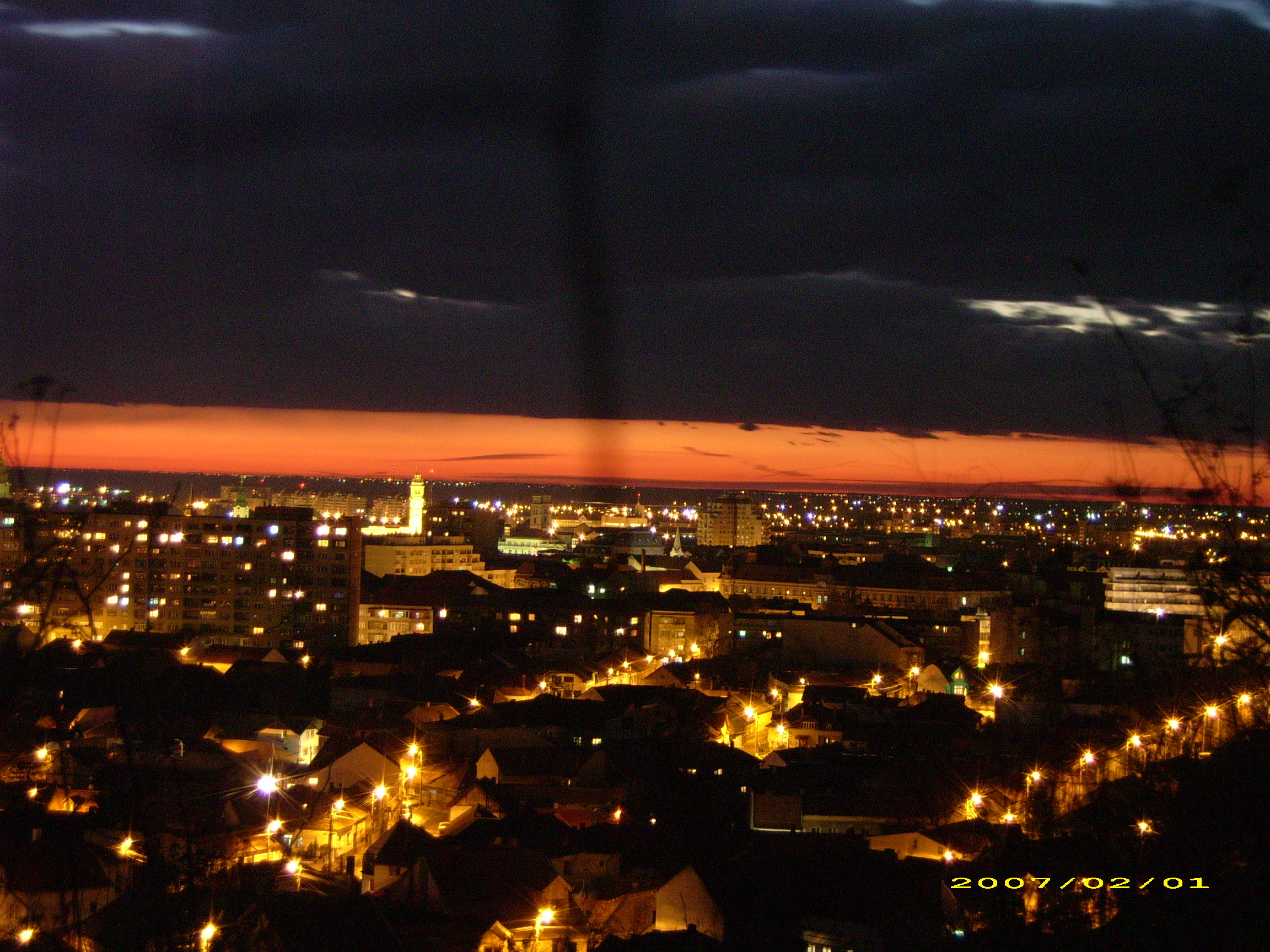
- Oradea skyline at night
- Country: Romania
- County: Bihor
- Central Municipality: Oradea
- Other localities: Biharia, Borş, Cetariu, Nojorid, Oșorhei, Paleu, Sânmartin, Sântandrei
- Functional: 2005

Population (2011 census)
  - Total: 235,462
- Time zone: UTC+2 (EET)
  - Summer (DST): UTC+3 (EEST)
- Postal Code: 41wxyz^{1}
- Area code: +40 x59^{2}
- Website: http://www.zmo.ro/
- ^{1}w, x, y, and z are digits that indicate the street, part of the street, or even the building of the address^{2}x is a digit indicating the operator: 2 for the former national operator, Romtelecom, and 3 for the other ground telephone networks

Oradea metropolitan area (Romanian: Zona Metropolitană Oradea or short ZMO) is a metropolitan area located in Western Romania, in the County of Bihor, Crișana, Transylvania, Romania and was founded on 9 May 2005.

According to Eurostat, in 2007 Oradea had a larger urban zone of 218,518 residents on an area of 125 km^{2} (48 sq mi). As of 2015, the Oradea functional urban area has a population of 239,390 residents.

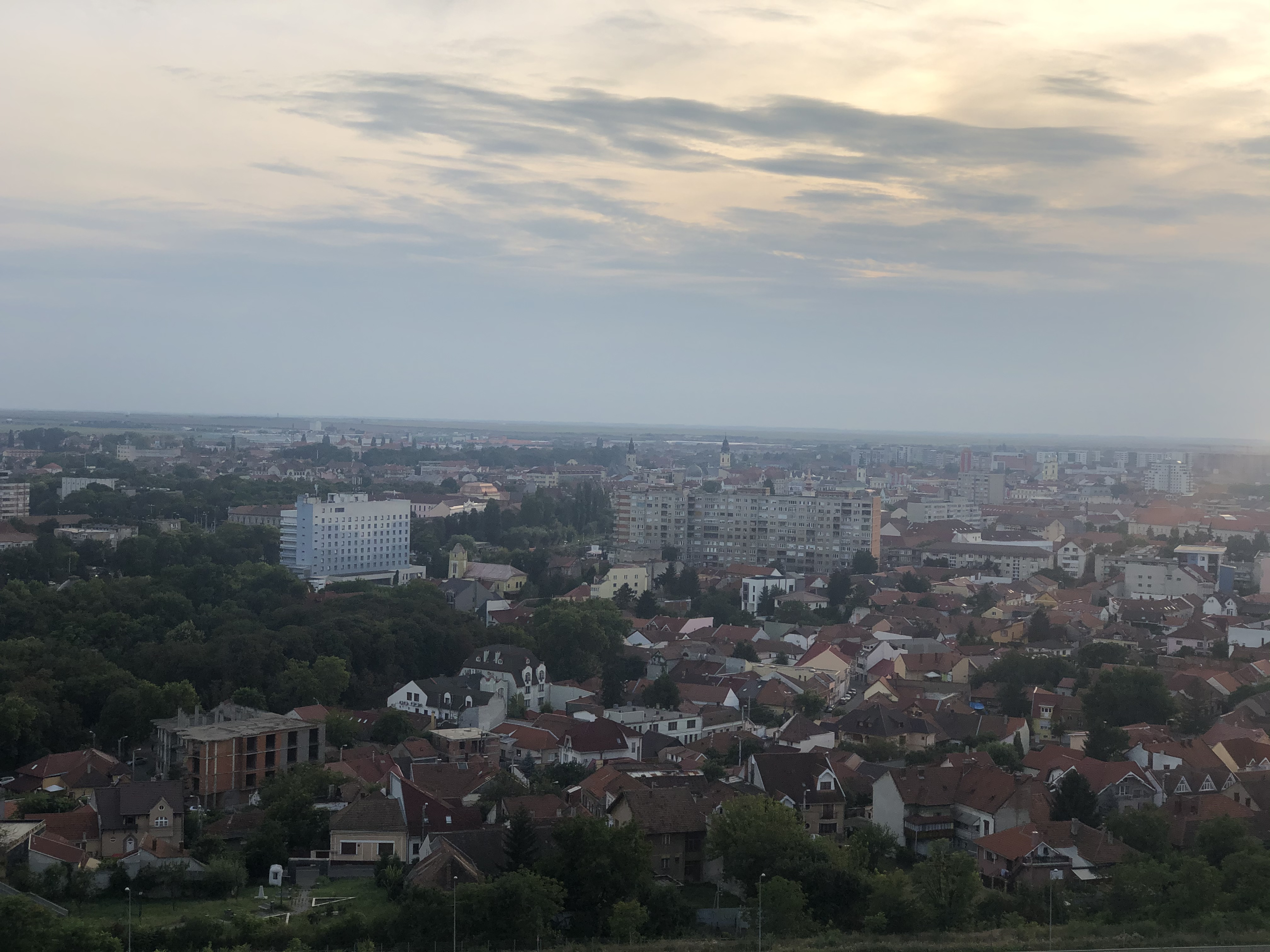
Oradea from a nearby hill

== Composition ==
The metropolitan area comprises the city of Oradea and 12 adjacent communes:

- Biharia
- Borș
- Cetariu
- Girișu de Criș
- Ineu
- Nojorid
- Oșorhei
- Paleu
- Sânmartin
- Sântandrei
- Toboliu
- Sânnicolau Român

== Population and ethnic structure ==
In 2011, the population of the metropolitan area was 235,462.

The population structure comprises:

- 70% Romanians
- 24% Hungarians
- 6% Roma and others

== Membership ==
The Oradea metropolitan area is a member of the METREX EU network.
