= Săldăbagiu =

Săldăbagiu may refer to several places in Romania:

- Săldăbagiu de Barcău, a village in Balc Commune, Bihor County
- Săldăbagiu de Munte, a village in Paleu Commune, Bihor County
- Săldăbagiu Mic, a village in Căpâlna Commune, Bihor County
- Săldăbagiu, a tributary of the Barcău in Bihor County
