= Dijir =

- Location within Romania

Location
- Country: Romania
- Counties: Bihor County
- Villages: Dijir, Iteu, Iteu Nou, Cohani

Physical characteristics
- Mouth: Barcău
  - location: Cohani
  - coordinates: 47.3282°N 22.3695°E
- Length: 15 km (9.3 mi)
- Basin size: 31 km^{2} (12 sq mi)

Basin features
- Progression: Barcău→ Crișul Repede→ Körös→ Tisza→ Danube→ Black Sea

The Dijir is a right tributary of the river Barcău in Romania. It discharges into the Barcău near Marghita. Its length is 15 km (9.3 mi) and its basin size is 31 km^{2} (12 sq mi).
