= Valea Vițeilor =

- Location within Romania

Location
- Country: Romania
- Counties: Bihor County
- Villages: Șișterea, Tăutelec, Sălard

Physical characteristics
- Mouth: Barcău
  - location: Sălard
  - coordinates: 47.2292°N 22.0215°E

Basin features
- Progression: Barcău→ Crișul Repede→ Körös→ Tisza→ Danube→ Black Sea
- Tributaries
  - right: Pârâul Înstelat, Șișterea, Danța

The Valea Vițeilor is a left tributary of the river Barcău in Romania. It discharges into the Barcău in Sălard.
