= Crișul Mic (Barcău) =

Crișul Mic Kis-Körös
- Location within Hungary Location within Romania

Location
- Countries: Romania and Hungary
- Counties: Bihor and Hajdú-Bihar
- Villages: Biharia; Santăul Mare; Bojt; Nagykereki

Physical characteristics
- Mouth: Barcău (Berettyó)
  - location: Szentpéterszeg
  - coordinates: 47.2242°N 21.6285°E

Basin features
- Progression: Barcău→ Crișul Repede→ Körös→ Tisza→ Danube→ Black Sea

The Crișul Mic (Hungarian: Kis-Körös) is a left tributary of the river Barcău (Hungarian: Berettyó) in Romania and Hungary. It discharges into the Berettyó in Szentpéterszeg. In Romania, its length is 15 km (9.3 mi) and its basin size is 58 km^{2} (22 sq mi).
