= Camăr (river) =

- Location within Romania

Location
- Country: Romania
- Counties: Sălaj, Bihor
- Villages: Camăr

Physical characteristics
- Mouth: Barcău
  - location: Balc
  - coordinates: 47.3049°N 22.5335°E
- Length: 11 km (6.8 mi)
- Basin size: 78 km^{2} (30 sq mi)

Basin features
- Progression: Barcău→ Crișul Repede→ Körös→ Tisza→ Danube→ Black Sea
- Tributaries
  - left: Bucmer

The Camăr is a right tributary of the river Barcău in Romania. It discharges into the Barcău in Balc. Its length is 11 km (6.8 mi) and its basin size is 78 km^{2} (30 sq mi).
