= Marghita =

Marghita Margitta
- Municipality
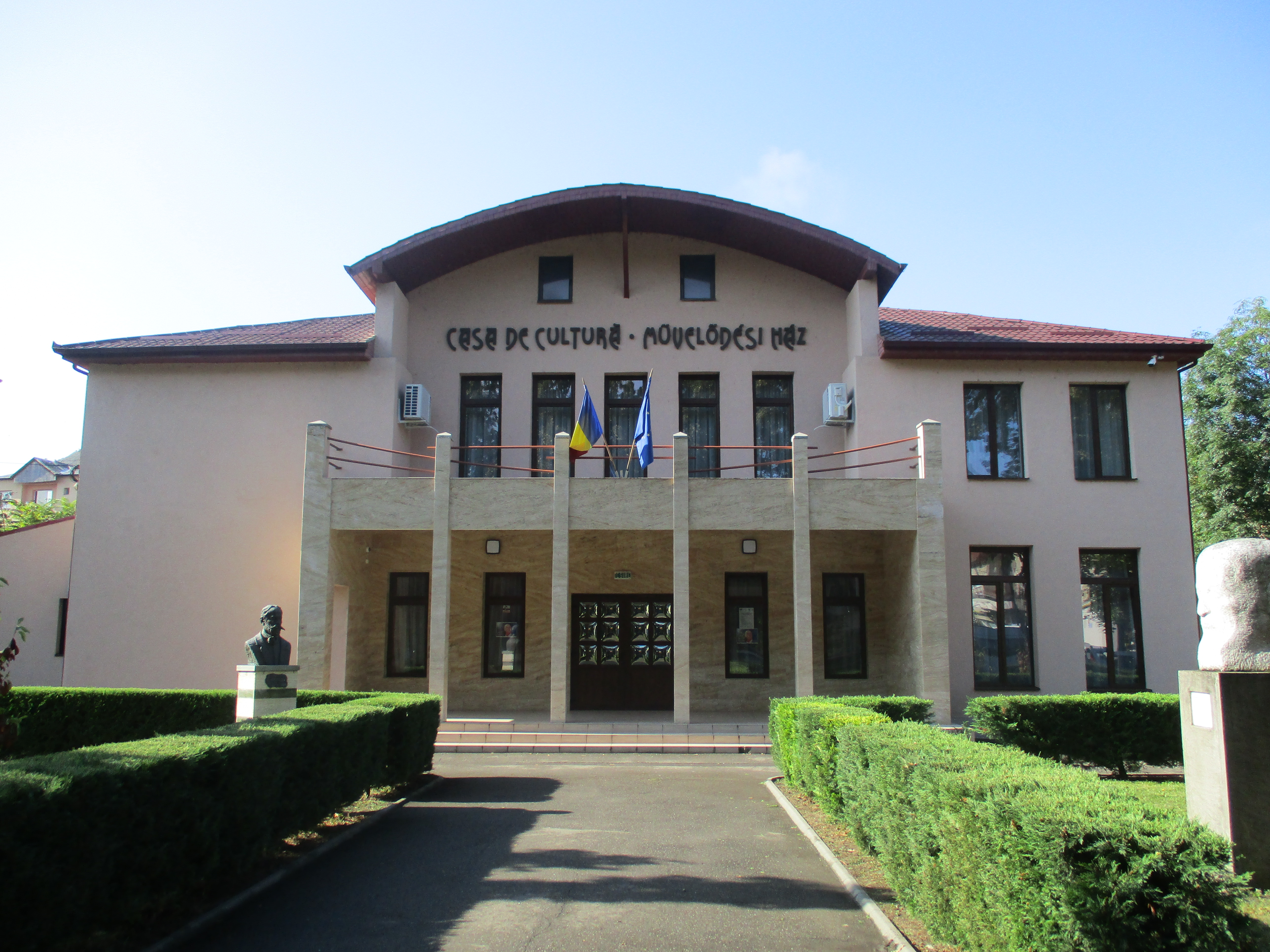
- House of culture in Marghita

- Coat of arms

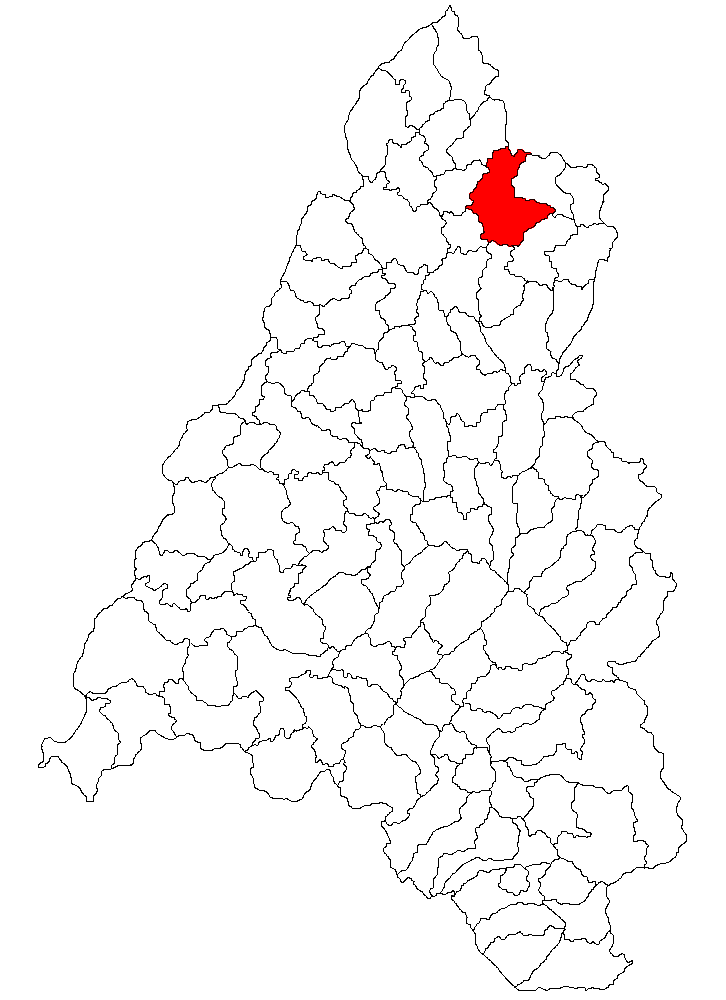
- Location within Bihor County

- Location in Romania
- Coordinates: 47°21′N 22°20′E
- Country: Romania
- County: Bihor

Government
  - Mayor (2024–2028): Zsolt Demián (UDMR)
- Area: 83.73 km^{2} (32.33 sq mi)
- Elevation: 135 m (443 ft)
- Population (2021-12-01): 13,573
  - Density: 162.1/km^{2} (419.8/sq mi)
- Time zone: UTC+02:00 (EET)
  - Summer (DST): UTC+03:00 (EEST)
- Postal code: 415300
- Area code: (+40) 02 59
- Vehicle reg.: BH
- Website: marghita.ro

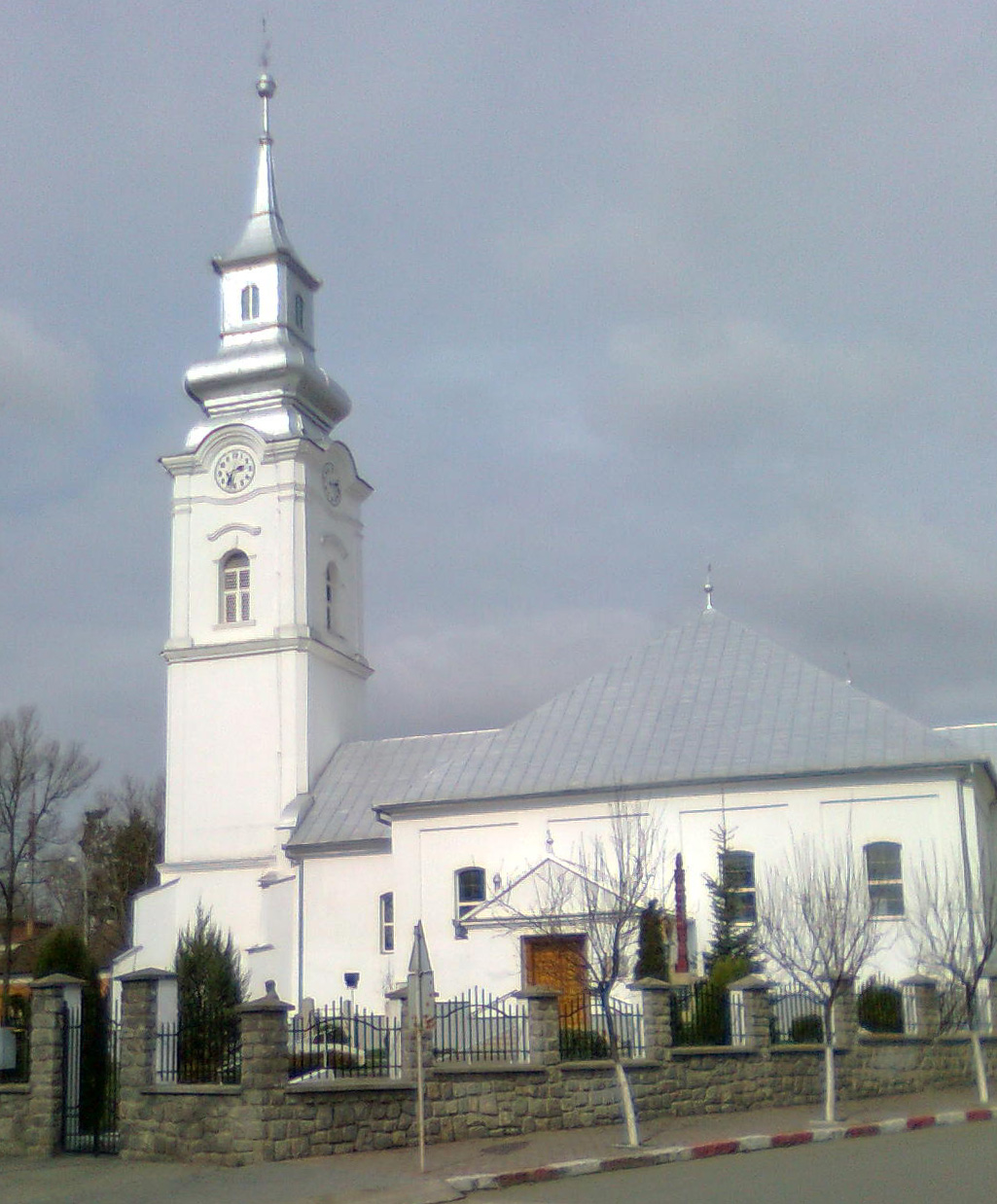
Reformed church in Marghita

Marghita (Romanian pronunciation: [marˈɡita]; Hungarian: Margitta [ˈmɒrɡittɒ]; German: Margarethen; Yiddish: מארגארעטין Margaretin) is a city in Bihor County, Romania. It administers two villages, Cheț (Magyarkéc) and Ghenetea (Genyéte).

== Geography ==
Marghita is located in the northern part of the county, 57 km (35 mi) north-east of the county seat, Oradea. It lies on the banks of the river Barcău, extending to the border with Satu Mare County; the river Inot discharges into the Barcău in Marghita.

The city borders the following communes: Viișoara and Abram to the east, Tăuteu to the south, Petreu and Buduslău to the west, and Sălacea and Pir to the north.

== History ==
The name appears to be derived from the name "Margit" which is the Hungarian form of (Margaret), Saint Margaret the patron of a local church. The first time it was used in a document was in 1216. In the 14th century, it became a feudal holding of the Hungarian landlord.

In 1376 King Louis I of Hungary gave Marghita the right of organizing a fair and it developed in the next centuries as a market town. There were several peasant revolts against the feudal system affecting Marghita in 1467 and 1514. At the beginning of the 16th century, it became along with parts of Bihor County and Hungary an Ottoman province until towards the end of the 17th century.

In 1823, a great fire destroyed half of the buildings of Marghita. After the 1848 revolution, the local peasants were no longer serfs and manufacturing and industry began to develop.

In the aftermath of World War I and the ensuing Hungarian–Romanian War, the Romanian Army entered the town, and after the Treaty of Trianon of 1920, Marghita became part of the Kingdom of Romania. During the interwar period, it became the seat of plasa Marghita, in Bihor County. In the wake of the Second Vienna Award of August 30, 1940, the territory of Northern Transylvania (of which the town of Marghita was part) reverted to the Kingdom of Hungary. In 1944, after German occupation, about 2,100 Jews of Marghita were sent to death, concentration, and labor camps as part of the Holocaust, of which only about 450 survived. Towards the end of World War II, the town was taken back from Hungarian and German troops by Romanian and Soviet forces in October 1944, during the initial stages of the Battle of Debrecen.

After 1947, with the Soviets imposing a Communist government in Romania, factories and land were nationalized. Over the course of the next few years, Marghita took part in the Romanian industrialization process. Following the administrative reform of 1950, the town became the seat of Marghita Raion within Bihor Region (renamed Oradea Region in 1952 and Crișana Region in 1960). In 1967, Marghita was declared a city. In 1968, the old territorial division into județe was reinstituted, and Marghita reverted to being part of Bihor County. In 2003, it was declared a municipiu.

== Politics ==
The Marghita Municipal Council, elected in the 2012 local government elections, is made up of 17 councillors, with the following party composition:

| Party | Seats | Current Council |
|---|---|---|
| Democratic Alliance of Hungarians in Romania | 7 | |
| National Liberal Party | 6 | |
| Social Democratic Party | 3 | |
| People's Party – Dan Diaconescu | 1 | |

== Population ==
Historical population
| Year | Pop. | ±% |
|---|---|---|
| 1880 | 4,685 | — |
| 1890 | 5,793 | +23.6% |
| 1900 | 6,658 | +14.9% |
| 1910 | 7,324 | +10.0% |
| 1920 | 7,578 | +3.5% |
| 1930 | 7,787 | +2.8% |
| 1941 | 8,640 | +11.0% |
| 1956 | 8,722 | +0.9% |
| 1966 | 11,179 | +28.2% |
| 1977 | 14,589 | +30.5% |
| 1992 | 19,071 | +30.7% |
| 2002 | 18,650 | −2.2% |
| 2011 | 15,134 | −18.9% |
| 2021 | 13,573 | −10.3% |
Source: Census data

At the 2011 census, the city 15,134 inhabitants, of which 51.7% were Romanians, 44.1% Hungarians, 3.5% Roma, and 0.5% Slovaks. At the 2021 census, Marghita had a population of 13,573; of those, 50.5% were Romanians, 34.82% Hungarians, and 4.2% Roma.

== Natives ==
- Attila Cseke (born 1973), Romanian lawyer and politician
- Nicolas Farkas (1890–1982), Austro-Hungarian-born cinematographer, screenwriter, and film director
- Violeta Friedman (1930–2000), Jewish Holocaust survivor turned author
- Brigitta Gődér (born 1992), Hungarian-Romanian footballer
- György Harag (1925–1985), theatre director and actor, worked primarily in Hungarian-language theatres in Romania
- George Pușcaș (born 1996), Romanian professional footballer
- Iosif Szökő (1930–2002), Hungarian-Romanian footballer
- Ioan Vulpescu (born 1976), Romanian politician

== Transportation ==
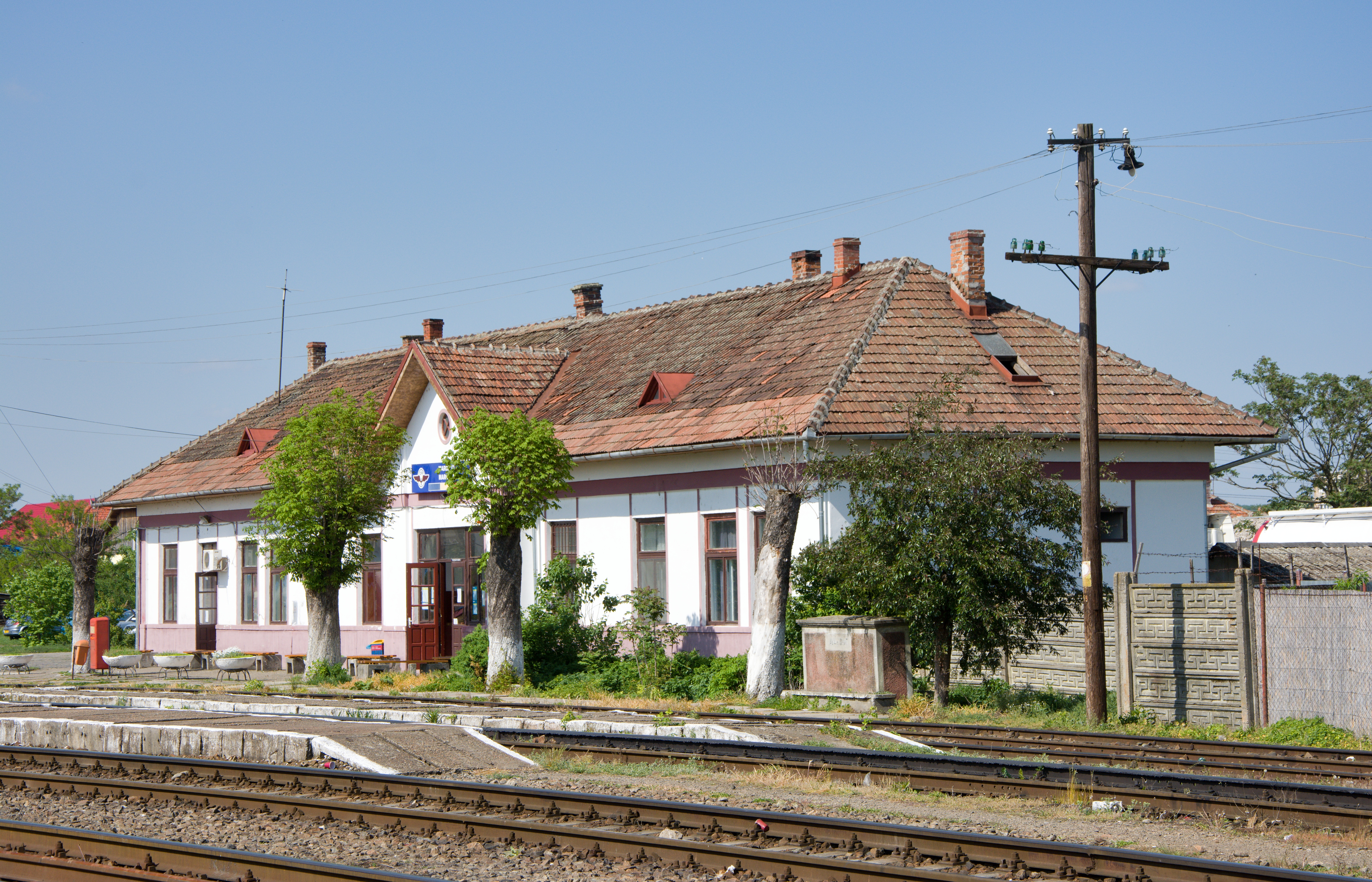
The Marghita train station

The city is traversed by national road DN19B, which connects the town of Săcueni, 20 km (12 mi) to the west, with Nușfalău, Sălaj County, 38 km (24 mi) to the south-east. County road DJ191 connects it to Tășnad to the north.

The Marghita train station serves the Via Terra rail line connecting Oradea to Sărmășag, Sălaj County.

== Education ==
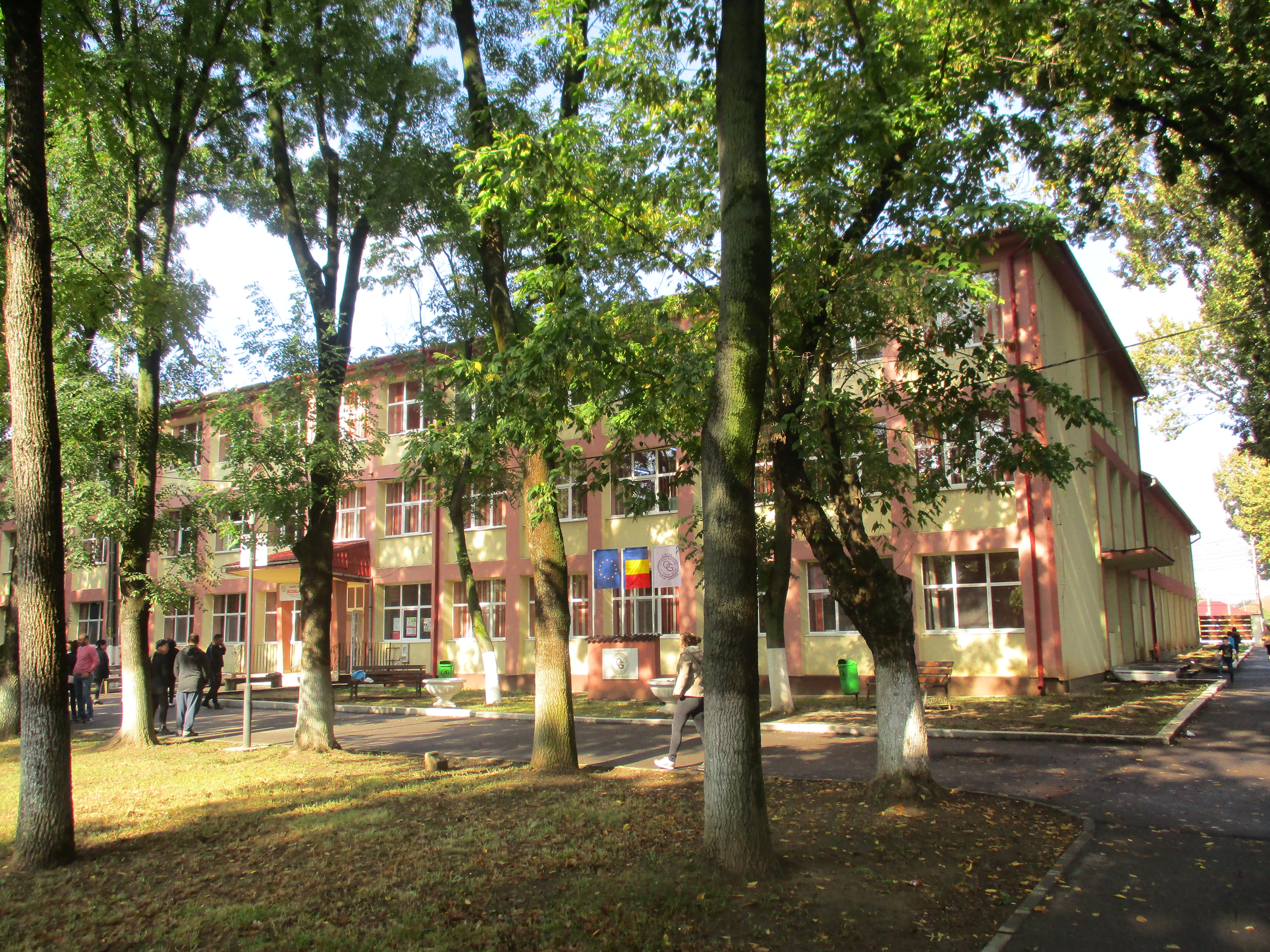
Elementary school in Marghita

Marghita is home to three high schools: the Octavian Goga National College, the Horváth János Theoretical High School, and the Horea Technological High School. There are also several elementary schools and three kindergartens.

== Sister cities ==
- Kiskőrös, Hungary
