= Chet (disambiguation) =

Chet or CHET may refer to:

== Places ==
- River Chet, a small river in South Norfolk, England
- Cheț, a village in Marghita city, Bihor County, Romania
- Cheț, a tributary of the Barcău in Bihor County, Romania

== Music ==
- Chet (Chet Atkins album) (1967)
- Chet (Chet Baker album) (1959)

== Media ==
- CHET-FM, a radio station in Chetwynd, British Columbia, Canada

== Persons ==
- Chet (given name), a masculine given name and a list of people so named
- Ilan Chet (born 1939), Israeli microbiologist, professor, and President of the Weizmann Institute of Science
- Chet Faker, stage name of Australian electronica musician Nicholas James Murphy

== Other uses ==
- Chet (month), a month of Punjabi calendar
- Heth or Chet, the eighth letter of the Proto-Canaanite alphabet
