= Valea Albă (Barcău) =

- Location within Romania

Location
- Country: Romania
- Counties: Bihor County

Physical characteristics
- Mouth: Barcău
  - location: Downstream of Chiraleu
  - coordinates: 47.3018°N 22.2528°E
- Length: 10 km (6.2 mi)
- Basin size: 23 km^{2} (8.9 sq mi)

Basin features
- Progression: Barcău→ Crișul Repede→ Körös→ Tisza→ Danube→ Black Sea

The Valea Albă is a left tributary of the river Barcău in Romania. It discharges into the Barcău near Chiraleu. Its length is 10 km (6.2 mi) and its basin size is 23 km^{2} (8.9 sq mi).
