= Tria (river) =

- Location within Romania

Location
- Country: Romania
- Counties: Bihor County
- Villages: Tria, Poclușa de Barcău

Physical characteristics
- Source: Pusta Budoi Hill
- Mouth: Barcău
  - location: Poclușa de Barcău
  - coordinates: 47.2628°N 22.1745°E
- Length: 17 km (11 mi)
- Basin size: 27 km^{2} (10 sq mi)

Basin features
- Progression: Barcău→ Crișul Repede→ Körös→ Tisza→ Danube→ Black Sea

The Tria is a left tributary of the river Barcău in Romania. It discharges into the Barcău in Poclușa de Barcău. Its length is 17 km (11 mi) and its basin size is 27 km^{2} (10 sq mi).
