= Sânnicolau =

Sânnicolau may refer to several places in Romania:

- Sânnicolau Mare, a town in Timiș County
- Sânnicolau Român, a commune in Bihor County
- Sânnicolau de Munte, a village in Săcueni town, Bihor County
- Sânnicolau de Beiuș, a village in Șoimi Commune, Bihor County
- Sânnicolau (river), a tributary of the Barcău in Bihor County
