= Sălard =

Sălard Szalárd
- Commune
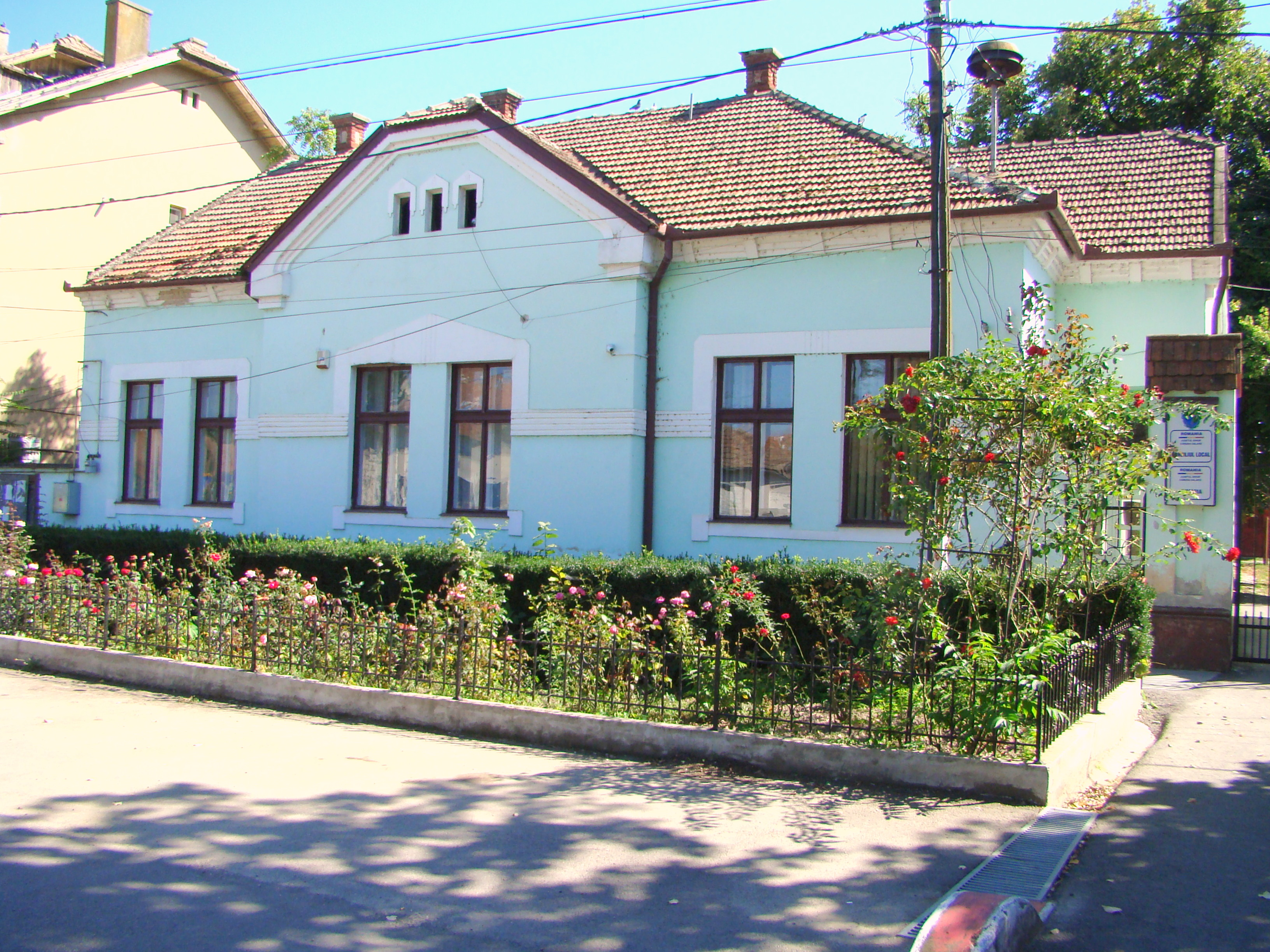
- Sălard townhall

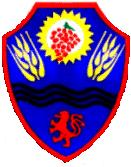
- Coat of arms

- Location in Romania
- Coordinates: 47°13′N 22°1′E
- Country: Romania
- County: Bihor
- Subdivisions: Hodoș, Sălard, Sântimreu

Government
  - Mayor (2020–2024): Miklós Nagy (UDMR)
- Area: 71.46 km^{2} (27.59 sq mi)
- Population (2021-12-01): 4,305
  - Density: 60.24/km^{2} (156.0/sq mi)
- Time zone: UTC+02:00 (EET)
  - Summer (DST): UTC+03:00 (EEST)
- Postal code: 417450
- Area code: +40 x59
- Vehicle reg.: BH
- Website: www.salard.ro

Sălard (Hungarian: Szalárd) is a commune in Bihor County, Crișana, Romania. It is composed of three villages: Hodoș (Jákóhodos), Sălard, and Sântimreu (Hegyközszentimre).

The commune is located in the northwestern part of the county, on the banks of the river Barcău. The river Sânnicolau discharges into the Barcău near Sântimreu.

Sălard is crossed by national road DN19E, which runs from Biharia, 12 km (7.5 mi) to the southwest, to Chiribiș, 27 km (17 mi) to the northeast. The county capital, Oradea, is 27 km to the south.
