= Groapa =

- Location within Romania

Location
- Country: Romania
- Counties: Sălaj County

Physical characteristics
- Mouth: Barcău
  - location: Zăuan
  - coordinates: 47.2215°N 22.6385°E
- Length: 10 km (6.2 mi)
- Basin size: 15 km^{2} (5.8 sq mi)

Basin features
- Progression: Barcău→ Crișul Repede→ Körös→ Tisza→ Danube→ Black Sea

The Groapa is a left tributary of the river Barcău in Romania. It discharges into the Barcău in Zăuan. Its length is 10 km (6.2 mi) and its basin size is 15 km^{2} (5.8 sq mi).
