= Valea Lacului (disambiguation) =

Valea Lacului may refer to the following rivers in Romania:

- Valea Lacului, a tributary of the Barcău in Bihor County
- Pârâul Lacului, a tributary of the Bega Veche in Timiș County
- Valea Lacului, a tributary of the Lotru in Vâlcea County
- Valea Lacului Roșu, a tributary of the Azuga in Brașov County
