= Cheț =

- Location within Romania

Location
- Country: Romania
- Counties: Bihor County
- Villages and cities: Cheț, Marghita

Physical characteristics
- Mouth: Barcău
  - location: Marghita
  - coordinates: 47.3306°N 22.3222°E
- Length: 12 km (7.5 mi)
- Basin size: 31 km^{2} (12 sq mi)

Basin features
- Progression: Barcău→ Crișul Repede→ Körös→ Tisza→ Danube→ Black Sea

The Cheț is a right tributary of the river Barcău in Romania. It discharges into the Barcău in the city Marghita. Its length is 12 km (7.5 mi) and its basin size is 31 km^{2} (12 sq mi).
