= Ip (river) =

- Location within Romania

Location
- Country: Romania
- Counties: Sălaj County
- Villages: Ip

Physical characteristics
- Mouth: Barcău
  - location: Ip
  - coordinates: 47.2253°N 22.6132°E
- Length: 9 km (5.6 mi)
- Basin size: 33 km^{2} (13 sq mi)

Basin features
- Progression: Barcău→ Crișul Repede→ Körös→ Tisza→ Danube→ Black Sea
- River code: III.1.44.33.7

The Ip (Hungarian: Ipp) is a right tributary of the Barcău in Romania. It flows into the Barcău in the village Ip. Its length is 9 km (5.6 mi) and its basin size is 33 km^{2} (13 sq mi).
