= Cerăsei =

- Location within Romania

Location
- Country: Romania
- Counties: Sălaj County
- Villages: Cerișa, Cosniciu de Sus, Cosniciu de Jos

Physical characteristics
- Mouth: Barcău
  - location: Cosniciu de Jos
  - coordinates: 47.2228°N 22.6198°E
- Length: 12 km (7.5 mi)
- Basin size: 29 km^{2} (11 sq mi)

Basin features
- Progression: Barcău→ Crișul Repede→ Körös→ Tisza→ Danube→ Black Sea

The Cerăsei is a left tributary of the river Barcău in Romania. It discharges into the Barcău in Cosniciu de Jos. Its length is 12 km (7.5 mi) and its basin size is 29 km^{2} (11 sq mi).
