= Valea Lacului =

- Location within Romania

Location
- Country: Romania
- Counties: Bihor County
- Villages: Petreu

Physical characteristics
- Mouth: Barcău
  - location: Petreu
  - coordinates: 47°19′12″N 22°17′28″E
- Length: 11 km (6.8 mi)
- Basin size: 22 km^{2} (8.5 sq mi)

Basin features
- Progression: Barcău→ Crișul Repede→ Körös→ Tisza→ Danube→ Black Sea

The Valea Lacului is a right tributary of the river Barcău in Romania. It discharges into the Barcău in Petreu. Its length is 11 km (6.8 mi) and its basin size is 22 km^{2} (8.5 sq mi).
