= Roșiori, Bihor =

Roșiori
- Commune
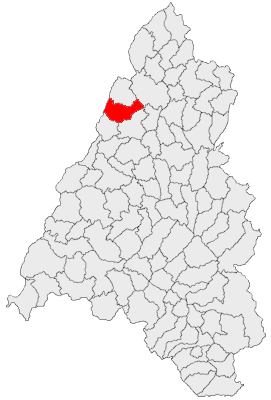
- Location in Bihor County

- Location in Romania
- Coordinates: 47.25°N 21.95°E
- Country: Romania
- County: Bihor
- Population (2021-12-01): 2,653
- Time zone: EET/EEST (UTC+2/+3)
- Vehicle reg.: BH

Roșiori (Hungarian: Biharfélegyháza) is a commune located in Bihor County, Crișana, Romania. It is composed of three villages: Mihai Bravu (Félegyházi Újtelep), Roșiori and Vaida (Biharvajda).
