= Sânnicolau (river) =

- Location within Romania

Location
- Country: Romania
- Counties: Bihor County
- Villages: Olosig, Sânnicolau de Munte, Sâniob

Physical characteristics
- Source: Târgușor
- Mouth: Barcău
  - location: Sâniob
  - coordinates: 47.2517°N 22.0950°E

Basin features
- Progression: Barcău→ Crișul Repede→ Körös→ Tisza→ Danube→ Black Sea

The Sânnicolau is a right tributary of the river Barcău in Romania. It discharges into the Barcău near Sântimreu.
