= Gavril Maghiar =

Romanian sports shooter

Personal information
- Born: 10 December 1926 Petreu, Romania
- Died: 2005

Sport
- Sport: Sports shooting

Gavril Maghiar (born 10 December 1926 – 2005) was a Romanian former sports shooter. He competed at the 1960 Summer Olympics and the 1964 Summer Olympics. He finished in 6th place in the rapid fire pistol event at the 1960 Olympics, and in 3rd place at the European Championships. He was one of the 6 emeritus coaches of Dinamo Sports Club in Bucharest, for sports shooting
