= Violeta Friedman =

Romanian Holocaust survivor, activist, and author

- Born: 1930; Marghita, Romania
- Died: 4 October 2000 (aged 69–70); Madrid, Spain
- Occupation: Writer

Violeta Friedman (1930–2000) was a Jewish Holocaust survivor, activist, and author born in Marghita, Romania. In 1985, she sued Léon Degrelle, former leader of the Belgian fascist party Rex and Holocaust denier, for claiming that Josef Mengele, the Schutzstaffel officer stationed at Auschwitz concentration camp who had ordered the gassing of Friedman's family, was an ordinary doctor and that no gas chambers existed at Auschwitz. In 1995 Friedman published a book titled Mis memorias (My Memories).

Friedman died in Madrid, Spain on 30 October 2000.
