= Viișoara, Bihor =

Viișoara Érszőllős
- Commune
- Location in Bihor County

- Location in Romania
- Coordinates: 47.3833°N 22.45°E
- Country: Romania
- County: Bihor
- Population (2021-12-01): 1,269
- Time zone: EET/EEST (UTC+2/+3)
- Vehicle reg.: BH

Viișoara (Hungarian: Érszőllős) is a commune in Bihor County, Crișana, Romania with a population of 1,336 people. It is composed of four villages: Izvoarele (Szolnokháza), Pădureni (Erdőtelep), Reghea (Csekenye), and Viișoara.

The commune is located in the northern part of the county, 67 km (42 mi) north-east of the county seat, Oradea, on the border with Satu Mare County.
