= Buduslău =

Buduslău Érbogyoszló
- Commune
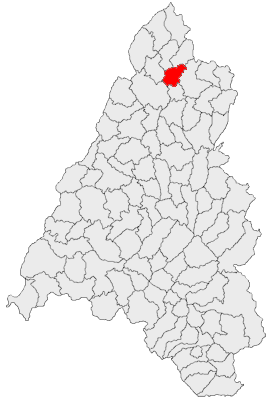
- Location in Bihor County

- Location in Romania
- Coordinates: 47°24′N 22°16′E
- Country: Romania
- County: Bihor
- Population (2021-12-01): 1,799
- Time zone: EET/EEST (UTC+2/+3)
- Vehicle reg.: BH

Buduslău (Hungarian: Érbogyoszló) is a commune in Bihor County, Crișana, Romania. It is composed of two villages, Albiș (Albis) and Buduslău. At the 2002 census, 94.5% of inhabitants were Hungarians, 3.9% Roma, and 1.4% Romanians.

== Natives ==
- János Irinyi (1817–1895), Hungarian chemist and inventor
