= Petreu =

Petreu Monospetri
- Commune
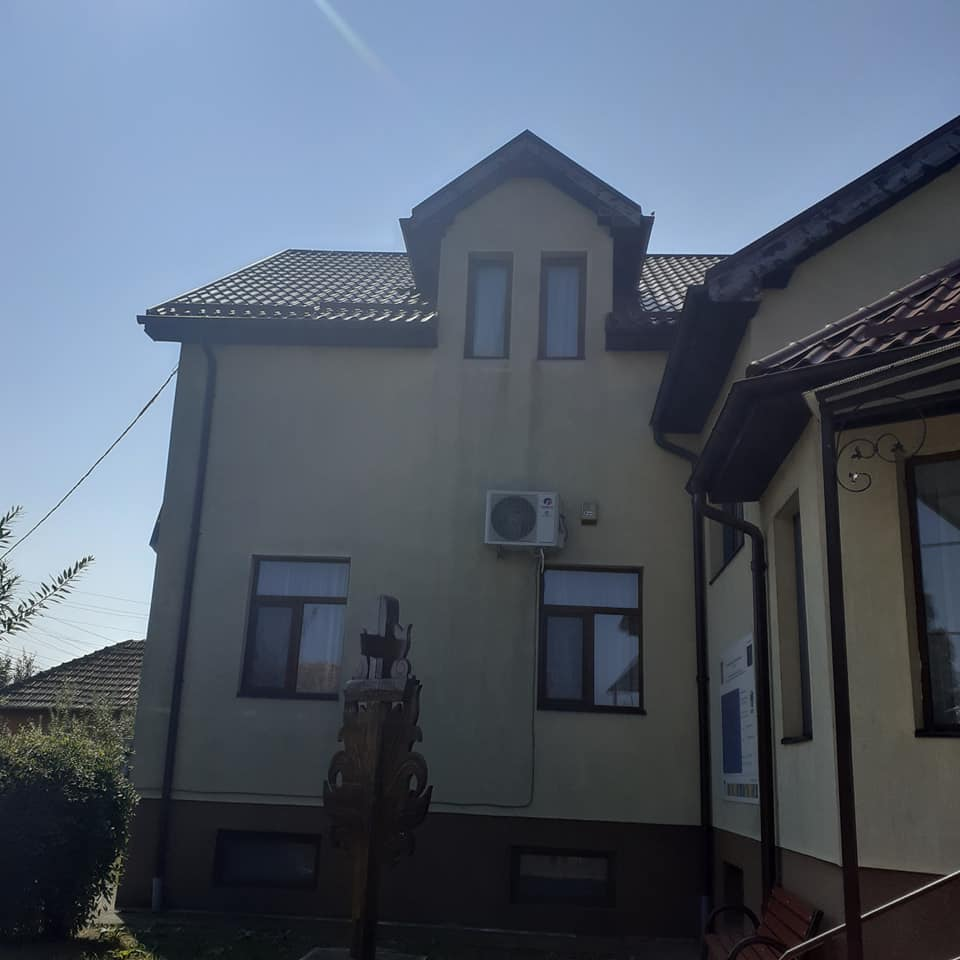
- Library and community center in Petreu

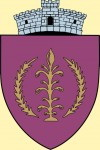
- Coat of arms

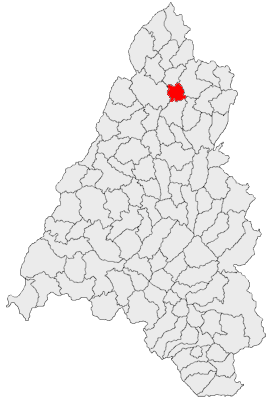
- Location in Bihor County

- Location in Romania
- Coordinates: 47°19′N 22°15′E
- Country: Romania
- County: Bihor

Government
  - Mayor (2020–2024): Barna Barcui (UDMR)
- Area: 45.67 km^{2} (17.63 sq mi)
- Elevation: 119 m (390 ft)
- Population (2021-12-01): 3,080
  - Density: 67.4/km^{2} (175/sq mi)
- Time zone: UTC+02:00 (EET)
  - Summer (DST): UTC+03:00 (EEST)
- Postal code: 417015
- Area code: +(40) x59
- Vehicle reg.: BH
- Website: comunapetreu.ro

Petreu (Hungarian: Monospetri) is a commune in Bihor County, Crișana, Romania with a population of 3,080 people as of 2021. It is composed of four villages: Abrămuț (Vedresábrány), Crestur (Apátkeresztúr), Făncica (Érfancsika), and Petreu.

The commune is located in the northern part of the county, on the banks of the river Barcău; to the west, between the Abrămuț and Făncica villages, flows the river Ier.

National road DN19B, which runs from Săcueni on the Hungarian border to Șimleu Silvaniei in Sălaj County, passes through the Crestur and Petreu villages. Just to the east of Petreu is the city of Marghita; the capital of Bihor County, Oradea, is 52 km (32 mi) to the southwest.

The commune was called Abrămuț and its administrative seat was located in that village until 2022, when a law changed the name.

Historical population
Year	Pop.	±%
1880	1,683	—
1890	2,043	+21.4%
1900	2,303	+12.7%
1910	2,664	+15.7%
1920	2,529	−5.1%
1930	2,807	+11.0%
1941	3,023	+7.7%
1956	3,137	+3.8%
1966	3,301	+5.2%
1977	3,245	−1.7%
1992	2,842	−12.4%
2002	3,020	+6.3%
2011	3,071	+1.7%
2021	3,080	+0.3%
Source: Census data

== Oilfield ==
The Abrămuț oil field is located on the territory of the commune. It was discovered in 1967 and developed by Petrom. It began production in 1968 and produces oil and gas.

The total proven reserves of the Abrămuț oil field are around 15×10^{6} barrels (2.4×10^{6} m^{3}), and production is centered on 800 barrels per day (130 m^{3}/d).

== Natives ==
- Gavril Maghiar (1926–2005), sports shooter.
