= Tăuteu =

Tăuteu Tóti
- Commune
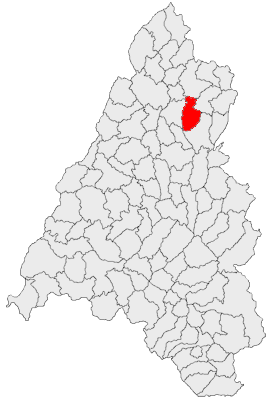
- Location in Bihor County

- Location in Romania
- Coordinates: 47°16′N 22°20′E
- Country: Romania
- County: Bihor
- Population (2021-12-01): 4,206
- Time zone: UTC+02:00 (EET)
  - Summer (DST): UTC+03:00 (EEST)
- Vehicle reg.: BH

Tăuteu (also Tăuteni; Hungarian: Tóti) is a commune in Bihor County, Crișana, Romania with a population of 4,063 people. It is composed of five villages: Bogei (Bozsaly), Chiribiș (Bisztraterebes), Ciutelec (Cséhtelek), Poiana (Rétimalomtanya) and Tăuteu.
