= Sălacea =

Sălacea Szalacs
- Commune
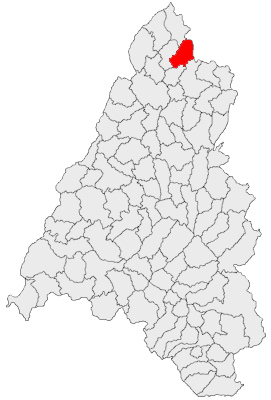
- Location in Bihor County

- Location in Romania
- Coordinates: 47°28′N 22°19′E
- Country: Romania
- County: Bihor
- Population (2021-12-01): 2,941
- Time zone: EET/EEST (UTC+2/+3)
- Vehicle reg.: BH

Sălacea (Hungarian: Szalacs) is a commune in Bihor County, Crișana, Romania with a population of 3,036. It is composed of two villages, Otomani (Ottomány) and Sălacea. The Otomani culture, a local Bronze Age culture (2100-1600 BC), takes its name from the village of Otomani.
