= Tămășeu =

Tămășeu Paptamási
- Commune
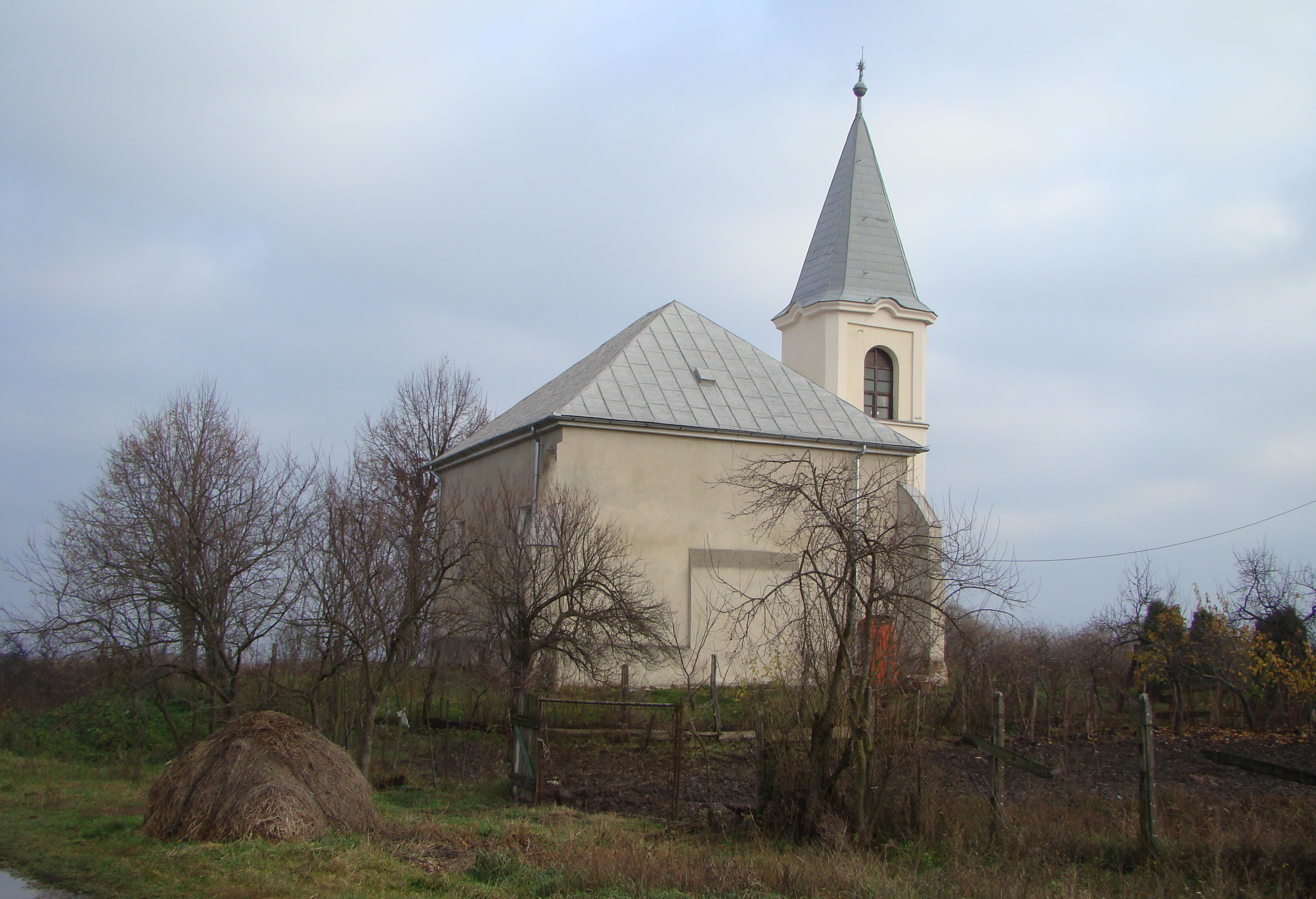
- Reformed church in Parhida

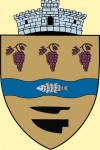
- Coat of arms

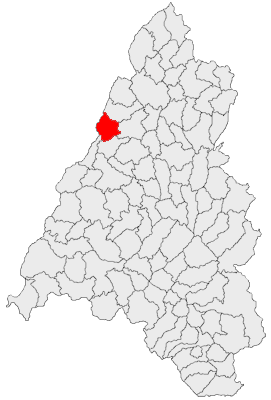
- Location in Bihor County

- Location in Romania
- Coordinates: 47°13′N 21°56′E
- Country: Romania
- County: Bihor

Government
  - Mayor (2020–2024): Miklós Matyi (UDMR)
- Area: 50.95 km^{2} (19.67 sq mi)
- Elevation: 104 m (341 ft)
- Population (2021-12-01): 1,990
  - Density: 39.1/km^{2} (101/sq mi)
- Time zone: UTC+02:00 (EET)
  - Summer (DST): UTC+03:00 (EEST)
- Postal code: 417056
- Area code: (+40) 02 59
- Vehicle reg.: BH
- Website: www.tamaseu.ro

Tămășeu (Hungarian: Paptamási) is a commune located in Bihor County, Crișana, Romania. It is composed of four villages: Niuved (Nyüved), Parhida (Pelbárthida), Satu Nou (Kügypuszta), and Tămășeu.

== Geography ==
The commune is located in the northwestern part of Bihor County, 22 km (14 mi) north of the county seat, Oradea, on the border with Hungary. It is crossed by national road DN19 (on this segment, part of European route E671), which runs from Oradea all the way to Sighetu Marmației, on the border with Ukraine.

== Demographics ==
At the 2021 census, Tămășeu had a population of 1,990, of which 77.84% were Hungarians, 16.43% Romanians, and 1.71% Roma.

== Sights ==
- Reformed church, built in 1835
- Lythia spring
- Thermal bath

== Natives ==
- Augustin Vancea (1892–1973), geologist, corresponding member of the Romanian Academy
