= Cetariu =

Cetariu Hegyközcsatár
- Commune
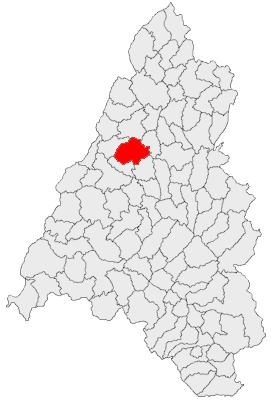
- Location in Bihor County

- Location in Romania
- Coordinates: 47°8′N 22°1′E
- Country: Romania
- County: Bihor
- Population (2021-12-01): 2,035
- Time zone: EET/EEST (UTC+2/+3)
- Vehicle reg.: BH

Cetariu (Hungarian: Hegyközcsatár) is a commune in Bihor County, Crișana, Romania with a population of 2,165 people. It is composed of four villages: Cetariu, Șișterea (Siter), Șușturogi (Sitervölgy) and Tăutelec (Hegyköztóttelek). It also included three other villages until 2003, when they were split off to form Paleu Commune.
