= Balc, Bihor =

Balc Bályok
- Commune
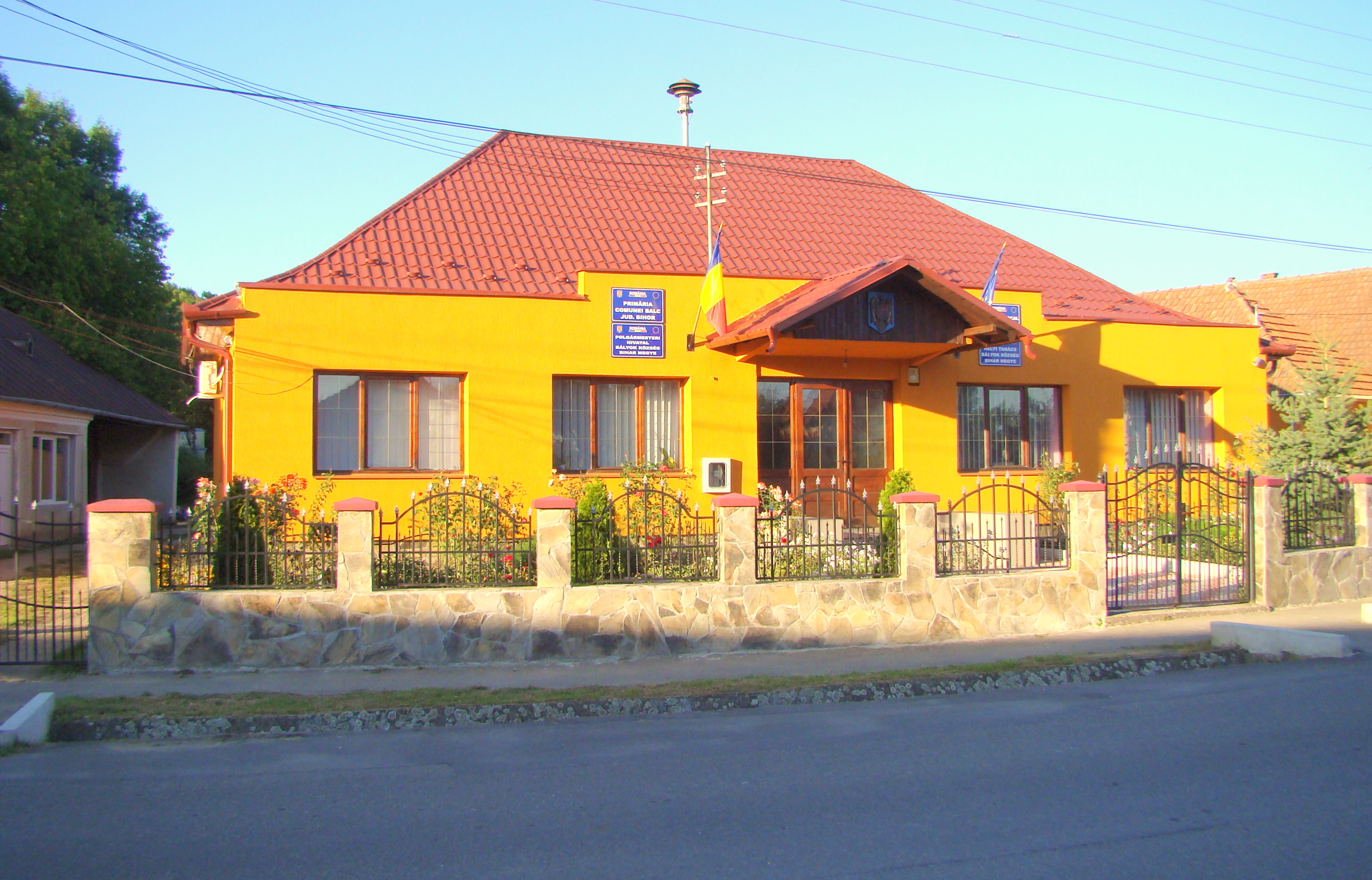
- Balc town hall

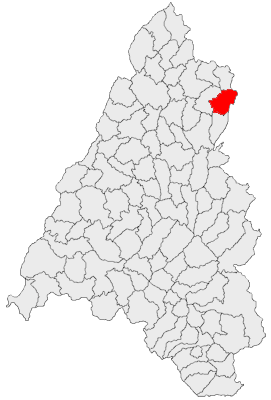
- Commune Balc in Bihor County

- Location in Romania
- Coordinates: 47°18′N 22°32′E
- Country: Romania
- County: Bihor

Government
  - Mayor (2020–2024): Sorin-Ionuț Sabău (PNL)
- Area: 79.08 km^{2} (30.53 sq mi)
- Elevation: 149 m (489 ft)
- Population (2021-12-01): 2,924
  - Density: 36.98/km^{2} (95.77/sq mi)
- Time zone: UTC+02:00 (EET)
  - Summer (DST): UTC+03:00 (EEST)
- Postal code: 417040
- Area code: +(40) 259
- Vehicle reg.: BH
- Website: comunabalc.ro

Balc (Hungarian: Bályok) is a commune located in Bihor County, Crișana, Romania. It is composed of five villages: Almașu Mare (Kozmaalmás), Almașu Mic (Szóvárhegy), Balc, Ghida (Berettyódéda), and Săldăbagiu de Barcău (Szoldobágy).

Historical population
Year	Pop.	±%
1880	2,261	—
1890	2,781	+23.0%
1900	3,353	+20.6%
1910	3,981	+18.7%
1920	4,035	+1.4%
1930	4,092	+1.4%
1941	4,446	+8.7%
1956	4,552	+2.4%
1966	4,864	+6.9%
1977	4,301	−11.6%
1992	3,682	−14.4%
2002	3,568	−3.1%
2011	3,281	−8.0%
2021	2,924	−10.9%
Source: Census data

At the 2021 census, the commune had a population of 2,924; of those, 59.06% were Romanians, 19.02% Roma, and 17.24% Hungarians.

== Sights ==
- Reformed Church in Balc, built in the 18th century (1791), historic monument
- Degenfeld-Schomburg Castle in Balc, built in the 19th century (1896), historic monument
