= Paleu =

Paleu Hegyközpályi
- Commune
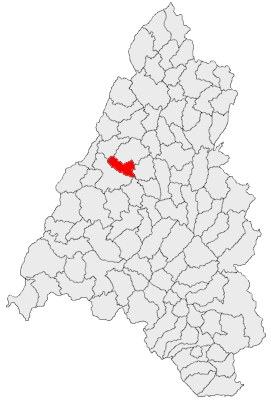
- Location in Bihor County

- Location in Romania
- Coordinates: 47°7′N 21°58′E
- Country: Romania
- County: Bihor
- Population (2021-12-01): 3,765
- Time zone: EET/EEST (UTC+2/+3)
- Vehicle reg.: BH

Paleu (Hungarian: Hegyközpályi) is a commune located in Bihor County, Crișana, Romania. It is composed of three villages: Paleu, Săldăbagiu de Munte (Hegyközszáldobágy) and Uileacu de Munte (Hegyközújlak). These were part of Cetariu Commune until 2003, when they were split off.

At the 2011 census, 74.2% of inhabitants were Hungarians and 25% Romanians.
