= Abram, Bihor =

Abram
- Commune
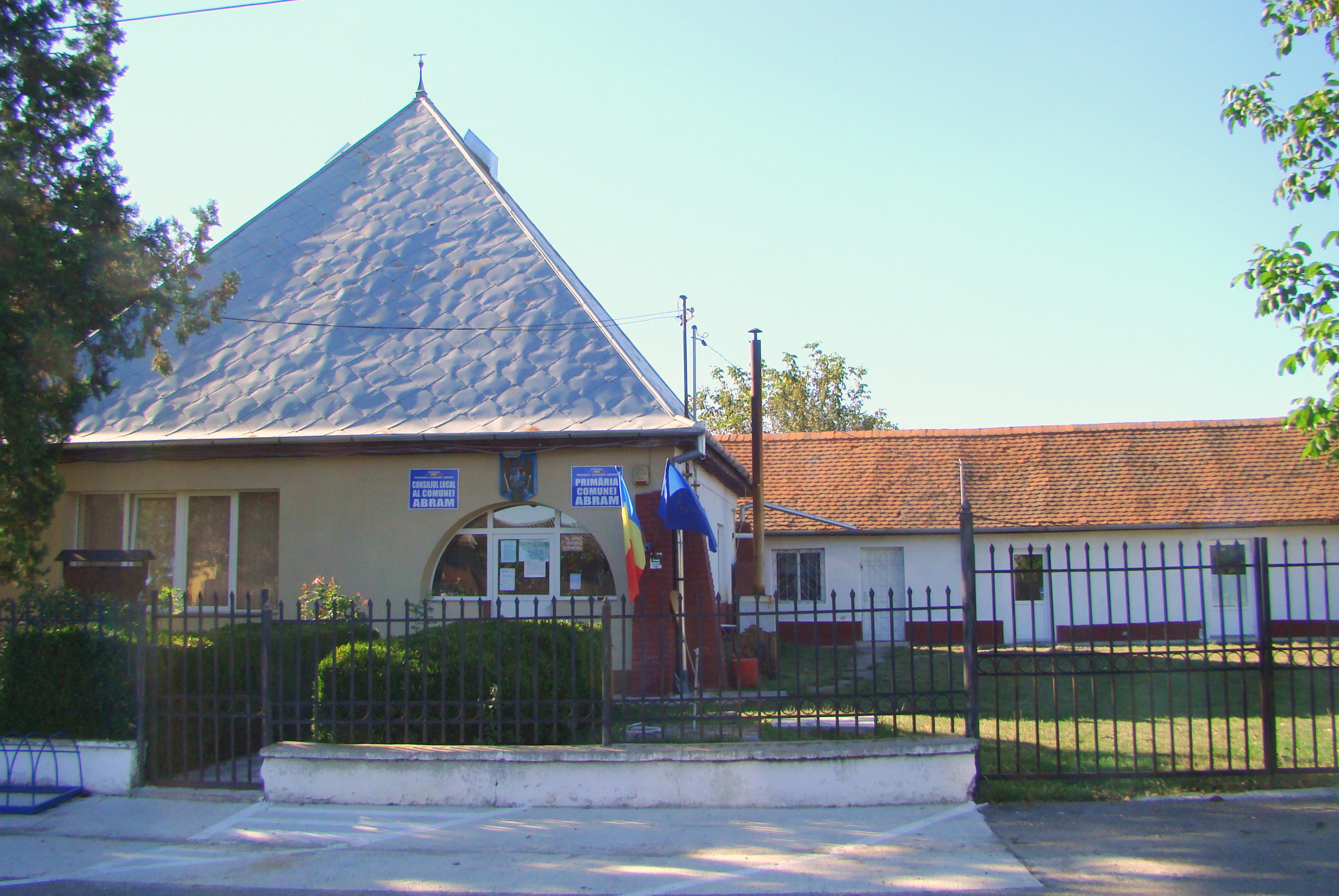
- Abram town hall

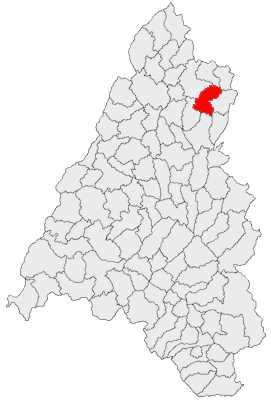
- Location in Bihor County

- Location in Romania
- Coordinates: 47°19′N 22°23′E
- Country: Romania
- County: Bihor

Government
  - Mayor (2024–2028): Gabriel Octavian Nuțaș (PNL)
- Area: 67.67 km^{2} (26.13 sq mi)
- Elevation: 133 m (436 ft)
- Population (2021-12-01): 2,728
  - Density: 40.31/km^{2} (104.4/sq mi)
- Time zone: UTC+02:00 (EET)
  - Summer (DST): UTC+03:00 (EEST)
- Postal code: 417005
- Area code: +(40) 259
- Vehicle reg.: BH
- Website: abram.ro

Abram (Hungarian: Érábrány) is a commune in Bihor County, Crișana, Romania. It is composed of eight villages: Abram, Cohani (Berettyókohány), Dijir (Dizsér), Iteu (Lüki), Iteu Nou (Újüki), Margine (Széltalló), Satu Barbă (Újbártfalva), and Suiug (Szunyogd).

Historical population
| Year | Pop. | ±% |
|---|---|---|
| 1880 | 2,376 | — |
| 1890 | 2,876 | +21.0% |
| 1900 | 3,692 | +28.4% |
| 1910 | 4,105 | +11.2% |
| 1920 | 4,127 | +0.5% |
| 1930 | 4,840 | +17.3% |
| 1941 | 5,112 | +5.6% |
| 1956 | 5,227 | +2.2% |
| 1966 | 4,789 | −8.4% |
| 1977 | 4,222 | −11.8% |
| 1992 | 3,417 | −19.1% |
| 2002 | 3,346 | −2.1% |
| 2011 | 2,808 | −16.1% |
| 2021 | 2,728 | −2.8% |
Source: Census data

At the 2021 census, the commune had a population of 2,728; of those, 78.45% were Romanians, 12.21% Roma, and 4.84% Hungarians.

== Natives ==
- Dorin N. Poenaru (born 1936), nuclear physicist and engineer
