= Ip, Sălaj =

Ip Ipp
- Commune
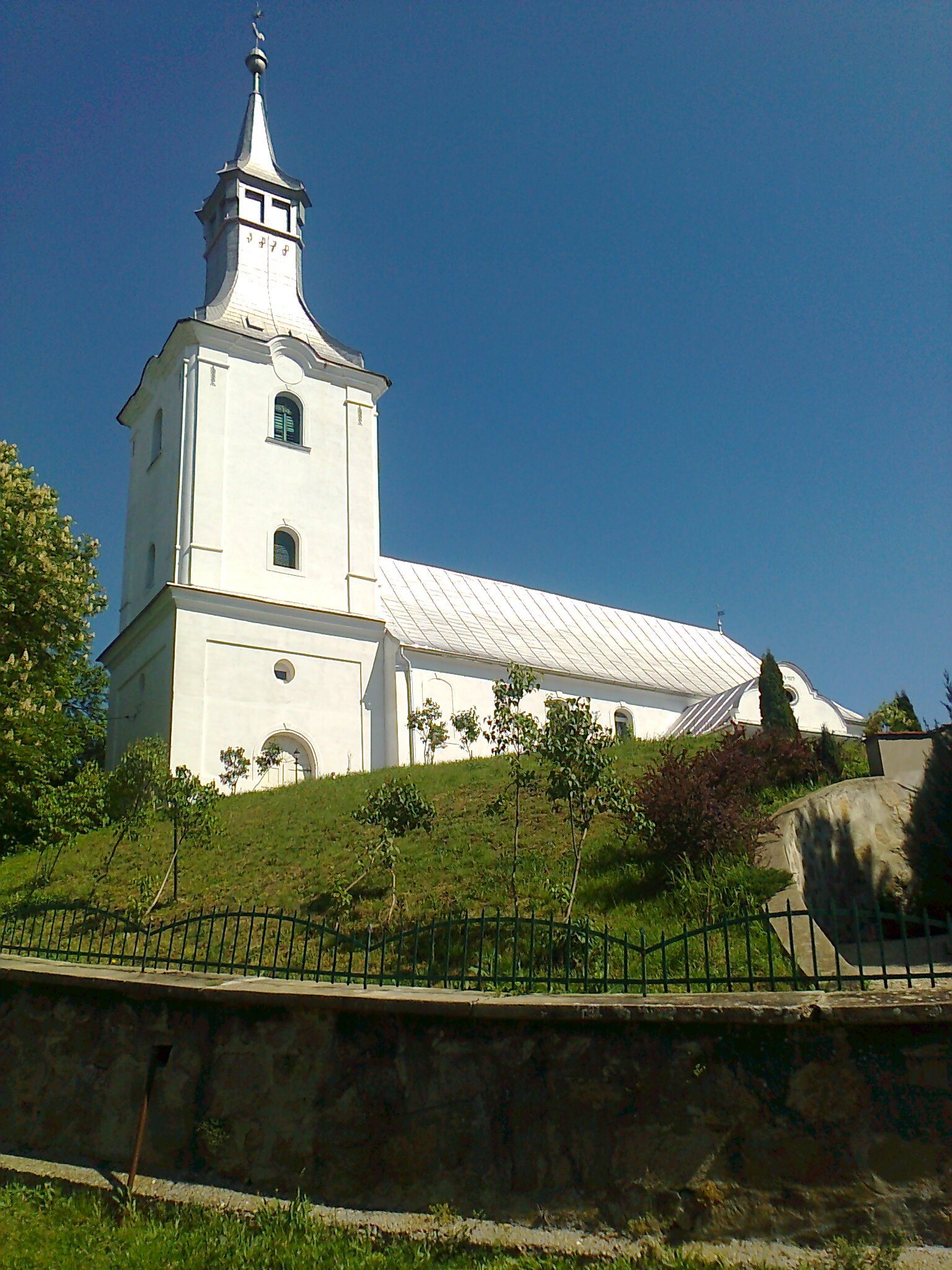
- Reformed church in Ip

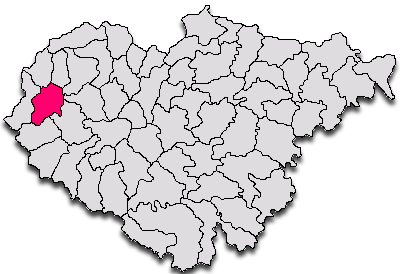
- Location in Sălaj County

- Location in Romania
- Coordinates: 47°13′45″N 22°36′22″E
- Country: Romania
- County: Sălaj

Government
  - Mayor (2020–2024): László Márkus (UDMR)
- Area: 59.89 km^{2} (23.12 sq mi)
- Elevation: 190 m (620 ft)
- Population (2021-12-01): 3,288
  - Density: 54.90/km^{2} (142.2/sq mi)
- Time zone: UTC+02:00 (EET)
  - Summer (DST): UTC+03:00 (EEST)
- Postal code: 457210
- Area code: (+40) 02 60
- Vehicle reg.: SJ
- Website: primariaip.ro

Ip (Romanian: Ip; Hungarian: Ipp) is a commune in Sălaj County, Crișana, Romania. It is composed of five villages: Cosniciu de Jos (Alsókaznacs), Cosniciu de Sus (Felsőkaznacs), Ip, Zăuan (Szilágyzovány), and Zăuan-Băi (Zoványfürdő). The name Ip is the shortest name that an urban or rural locality bears in all of Romania, being the only name composed of only two letters.

The commune was the initial site of the events that led to the Ip massacre in 1940.

== Sights ==
- Reformed Church in Ip, built in the 16th century, historic monument
