= Biharia =

Biharia Bihar
- Commune
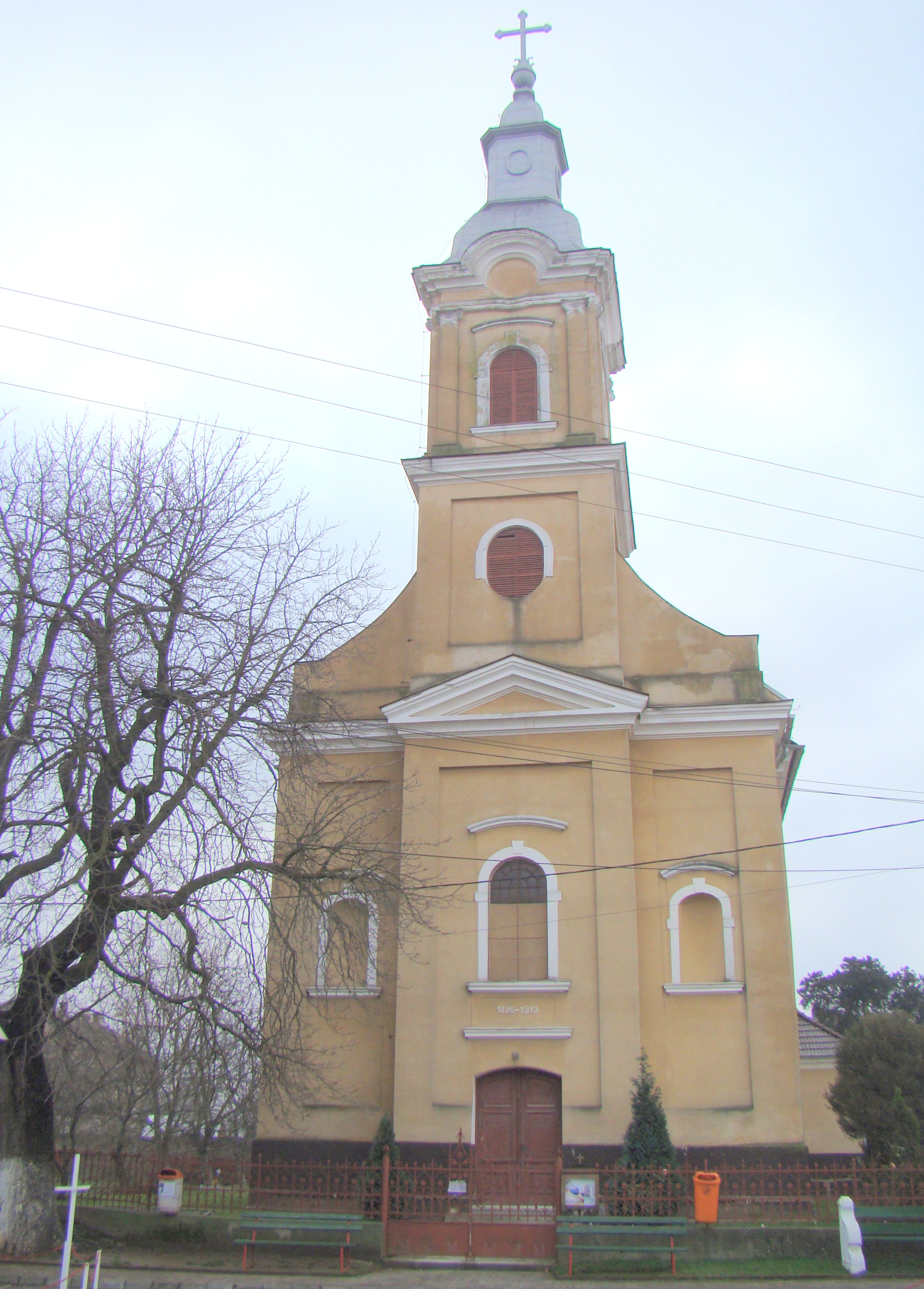
- Catholic Church in Biharia

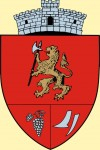
- Coat of arms

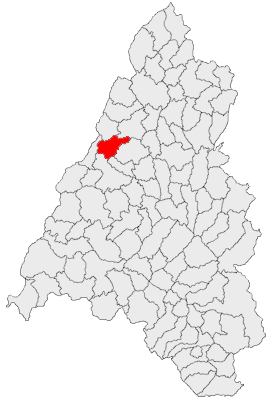
- Location in Bihor County

- Location in Romania
- Coordinates: 47°9′13″N 21°55′18″E
- Country: Romania
- County: Bihor

Government
  - Mayor (2020–2024): Zoltan Szilagyi (UDMR)
- Area: 58.50 km^{2} (22.59 sq mi)
- Elevation: 119 m (390 ft)
- Population (2021-12-01): 4,393
  - Density: 75.09/km^{2} (194.5/sq mi)
- Time zone: UTC+02:00 (EET)
  - Summer (DST): UTC+03:00 (EEST)
- Postal code: 417050
- Area code: +(40) 259
- Vehicle reg.: BH
- Website: comunabiharia.ro

Biharia (Hungarian: Bihar) is a commune in Bihor County, Crișana, Romania. It is composed of two villages, Biharia and Cauaceu (Hegyközkovácsi).

== History ==
The village is first mentioned in 1067 as Byhor, later as Bychor in 1213, as Bihar in 1332, and again, in 1349 as Byhor. The Gesta Hungarorum, which is believed to have been written around the time of King Béla III of Hungary (1172–1196), mentions that Duke Árpád (born 845) sent envoys to a castle called Bychor, to Duke Menumorout.

Biharia has a complex political history, with periods of the Kingdom of Hungary, Eastern Hungarian Kingdom, and the Principality of Transylvania. With the breakup of Austria-Hungary at the end of World War I and the ensuing Hungarian–Romanian War, the Romanian Army entered the village, and after Treaty of Trianon of 1920, Biharia became part of the Kingdom of Romania. During the interwar period, it became part of plasa Centrală, in Bihor County. In the wake of the Second Vienna Award of August 30, 1940, the territory of Northern Transylvania (of which the town of Biharia was part) reverted to the Kingdom of Hungary. Towards the end of World War II, the town was taken back from Hungarian and German troops by Romanian and Soviet forces in October 1944, during the initial stages of the Battle of Debrecen.

Following the administrative reform of 1950, the commune became fell in Oradea Raion, within Bihor Region (renamed Oradea Region in 1952 and Crișana Region in 1960). In 1968, the old territorial division into județe was reinstituted, and Biharia reverted to being part of Bihor County.

== Demographics ==
Historical population
Year	Pop.	±%
1880	5,248	—
1890	5,909	+12.6%
1900	6,382	+8.0%
1910	6,533	+2.4%
1920	7,144	+9.4%
1930	6,741	−5.6%
1941	6,804	+0.9%
1956	6,934	+1.9%
1966	7,039	+1.5%
1977	6,962	−1.1%
1992	5,668	−18.6%
2002	5,870	+3.6%
2011	4,205	−28.4%
2021	4,393	+4.5%
Source: Census data

At the 2011 census, the commune had 4,205 inhabitants, of whom 85.87% were Hungarians, 12.12% Romanians, and 1.73% Roma. At the 2021 census, Biharia had a population of 4,393; of those, 74.37% were Hungarians, 17.94% Romanians, and 1.18% Roma.

== Sights ==
- Biharia Citadel built in the 9th century, historic monument
