= Chișlaz =

Chișlaz Vámosláz
- Commune
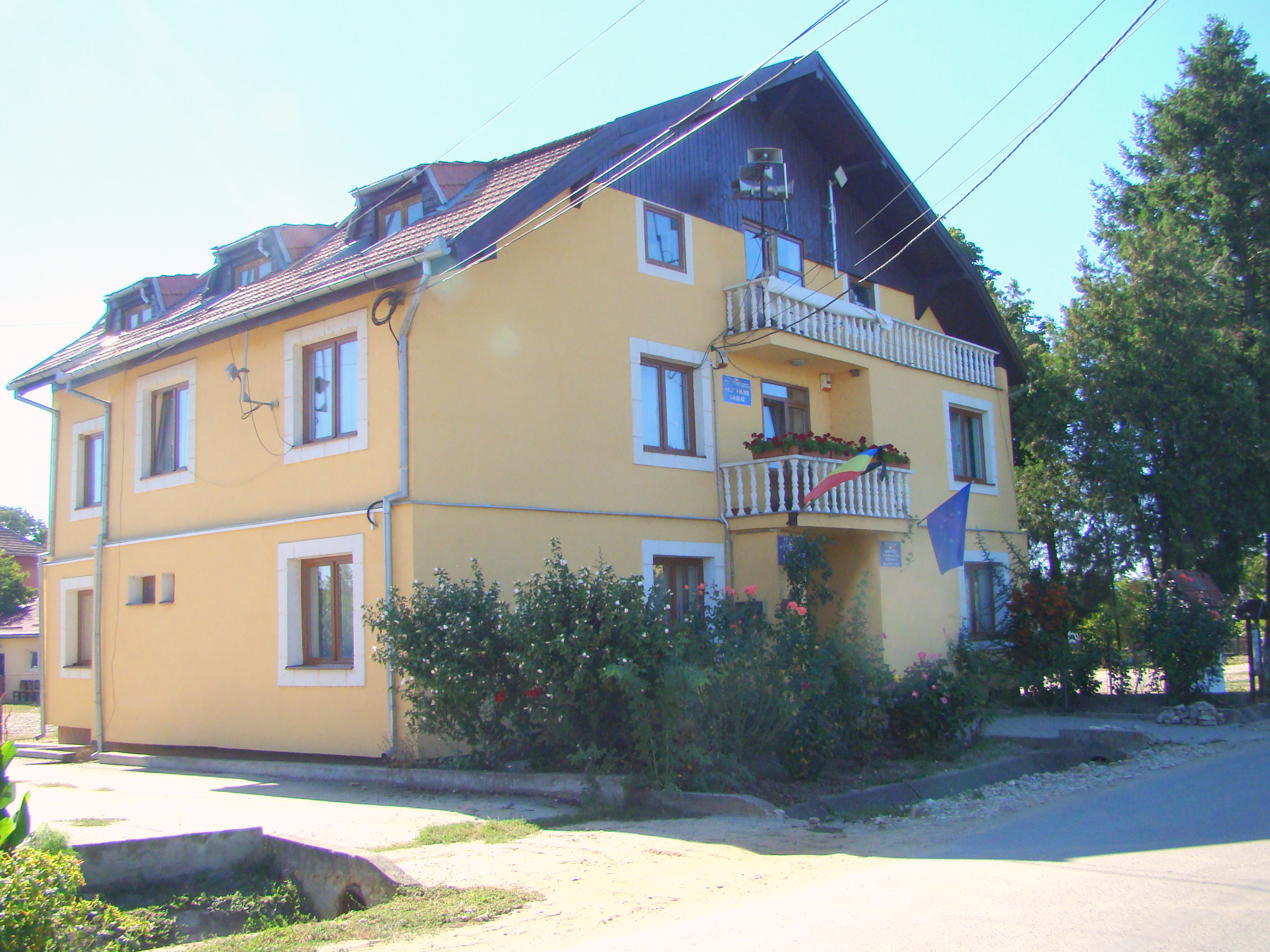
- Chișlaz town hall

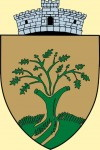
- Coat of arms

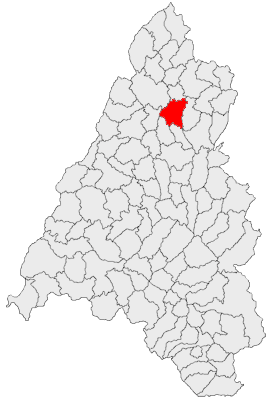
- Location in Bihor County

- Location in Romania
- Coordinates: 47°17′N 22°14′E
- Country: Romania
- County: Bihor

Government
  - Mayor (2020–2024): George Dorin Bézi (PNL)
- Area: 72.05 km^{2} (27.82 sq mi)
- Elevation: 118 m (387 ft)
- Population (2021-12-01): 3,057
  - Density: 42.43/km^{2} (109.9/sq mi)
- Time zone: UTC+02:00 (EET)
  - Summer (DST): UTC+03:00 (EEST)
- Postal code: 417180
- Area code: +(40) x59
- Vehicle reg.: BH
- Website: comunachislaz.ro

Chișlaz (Hungarian: Vámosláz) is a commune in Bihor County, Crișana, Romania with a population of 3,057 people as of 2021. It is composed of seven villages: Chiraleu (Berettyókirályi), Chișlaz, Hăucești (Hőke), Mișca (Micske), Poclușa de Barcău (Poklostelek), Sărsig (Sárszeg), and Sânlazăr (Szentlázár).
