= Bihor County =

County of Romania

Coordinates: 47.0722°N 21.9211°E

Bihor County Județul Bihor Bihar megye
- County
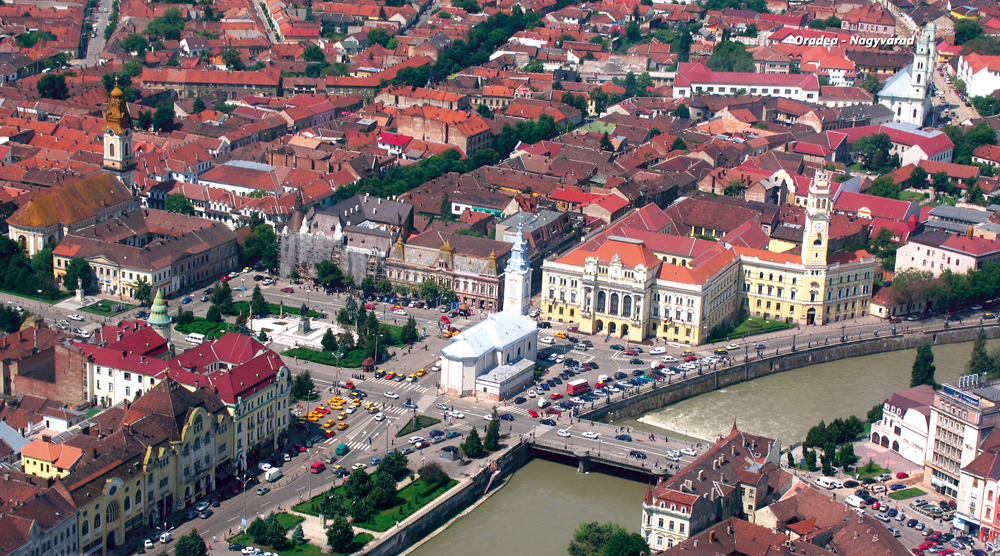
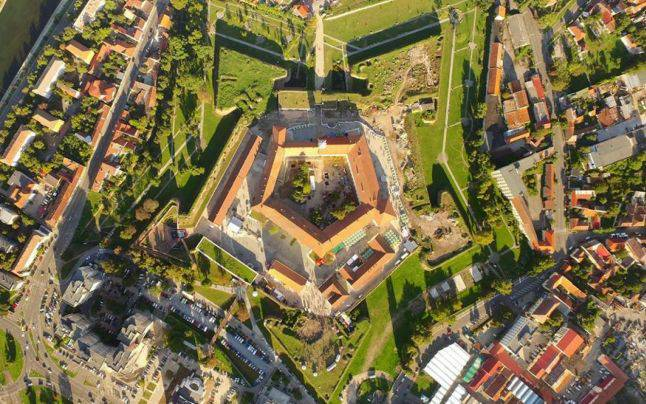
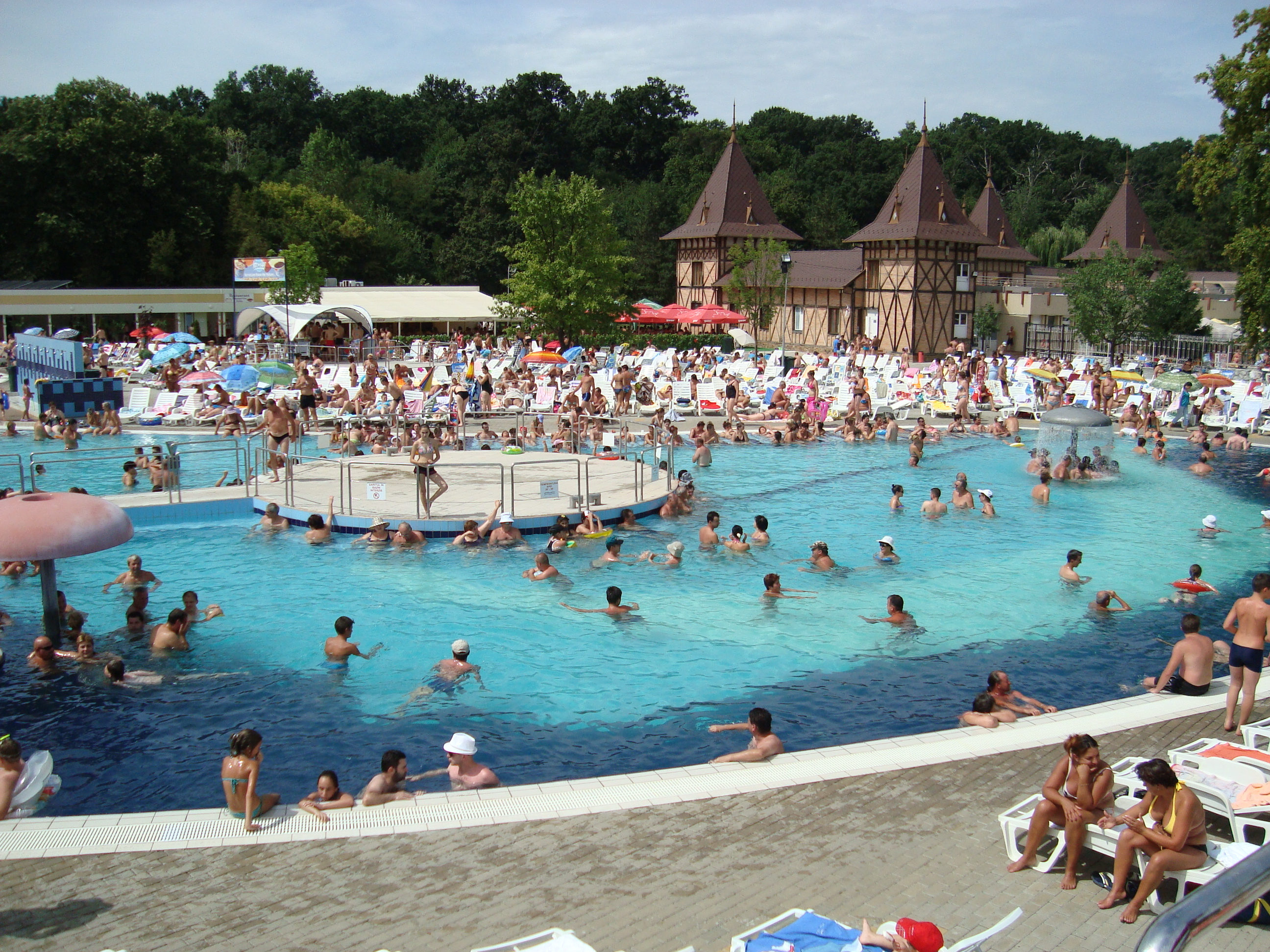
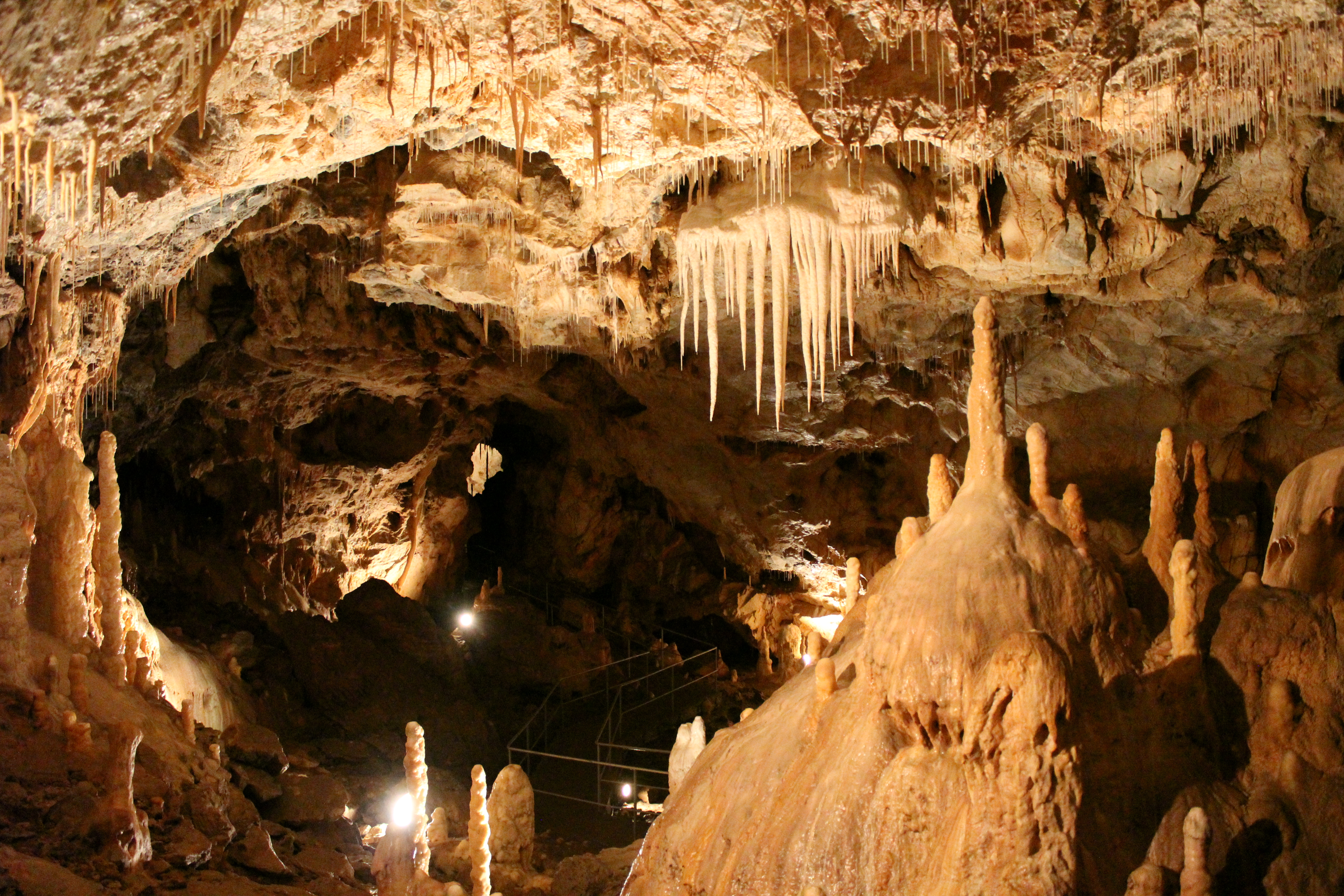
- Oradea Oradea Fortress "Apollo" baths, Băile Felix Bears' Cave

- Flag Coat of arms

- Location of Bihor County in Romania
- Country: Romania
- Historic region: Crișana
- Capital city (Reședință de județ): Oradea

Government
  - Type: County Council
  - President of the County Council: Mircea Mălan
  - Prefect^{2}: Dumitru Țiplea

Area
  - Total: 7,544 km^{2} (2,913 sq mi)
  - Rank: 6th in Romania
- Highest elevation: 1,849 m (6,066 ft)
- Lowest elevation: 89 m (292 ft)

Population (2021-12-01)
  - Total: 551,297
  - Rank: 11th in Romania
  - Density: 73.08/km^{2} (189.3/sq mi)
- Time zone: UTC+2 (EET)
  - Summer (DST): UTC+3 (EEST)
- Postal Code: 41wxyz^{3}
- Area code: +40 x59^{4}
- ISO 3166 code: RO-BH
- Car Plates: BH^{5}
- GDP: US$9.400 billion (2025)
- GDP per Capita: US$17,050 (2025)
- Website: County Council; County Prefecture
- ^{1}The developing regions of Romania have no administrative role. They were formed to attract funds from the European Union^{2} as of 2007, the Prefect is not a politician, but a civil servant. He (or she) is not allowed to be a member of a political party, and is banned from any political activity in the first six months after the resignation (or firing) from the civil service^{3}w, x, y, and z are digits that indicate the city, the street, part of the street, or even the building of the address^{4}x is a digit indicating the operator: 2 for the former national operator, Romtelecom, and 3 for the other ground telephone networks^{5}used on both the plates of the vehicles that operate only in the county limits (like utility vehicles, ATVs, etc.), and the ones used outside the county

Bihor County (Romanian pronunciation: [biˈhor], Hungarian: Bihar megye) is a county (județ) in western Romania. With a total area of 7,544 km^{2} (2,913 sq mi), Bihor is Romania's 6th largest county geographically and the main county in the historical region of Crișana. Its capital city is Oradea (Nagyvárad).

== Toponymy ==
The origin of the name Bihor is uncertain, except that it likely takes its name from an ancient fortress in the current commune of Biharia. It possibly came from vihor, the Serbian and Ukrainian word for "whirlwind" (вихор), or Slavic biela hora, meaning "white mountain". Another theory is that Biharea is of Daco-Thracian etymology (bi meaning "two" and harati "take" or "lead"), possibly meaning two possessions of land in the Duchy of Menumorut (Ménmarót). Another theory is that the name comes from bour, the Romanian term for aurochs (from the Latin word bubalus). The animal once inhabited the lands of northwestern Romania. Under this controversial theory, the name changed from buar to buhar and to Bihar and Bihor.

== Coat of arms ==
The coat of arms of Bihor County was adopted in 1998, and is a quarterly shield featuring a castle (for the Castle of Bihar), five wheat stalks with a ribbon, a grape and a scroll with the text of Deșteaptă-te, române!, covered with a fess featuring three fish. It was subject to redesign in 2013 after it was discovered by a local teacher that the text on the scroll was erroneously written in Greek, rather than Cyrillic (the original alphabet used to write the poem's text) or the Latin alphabet. The county has no significant history with Greece.

== Geography ==

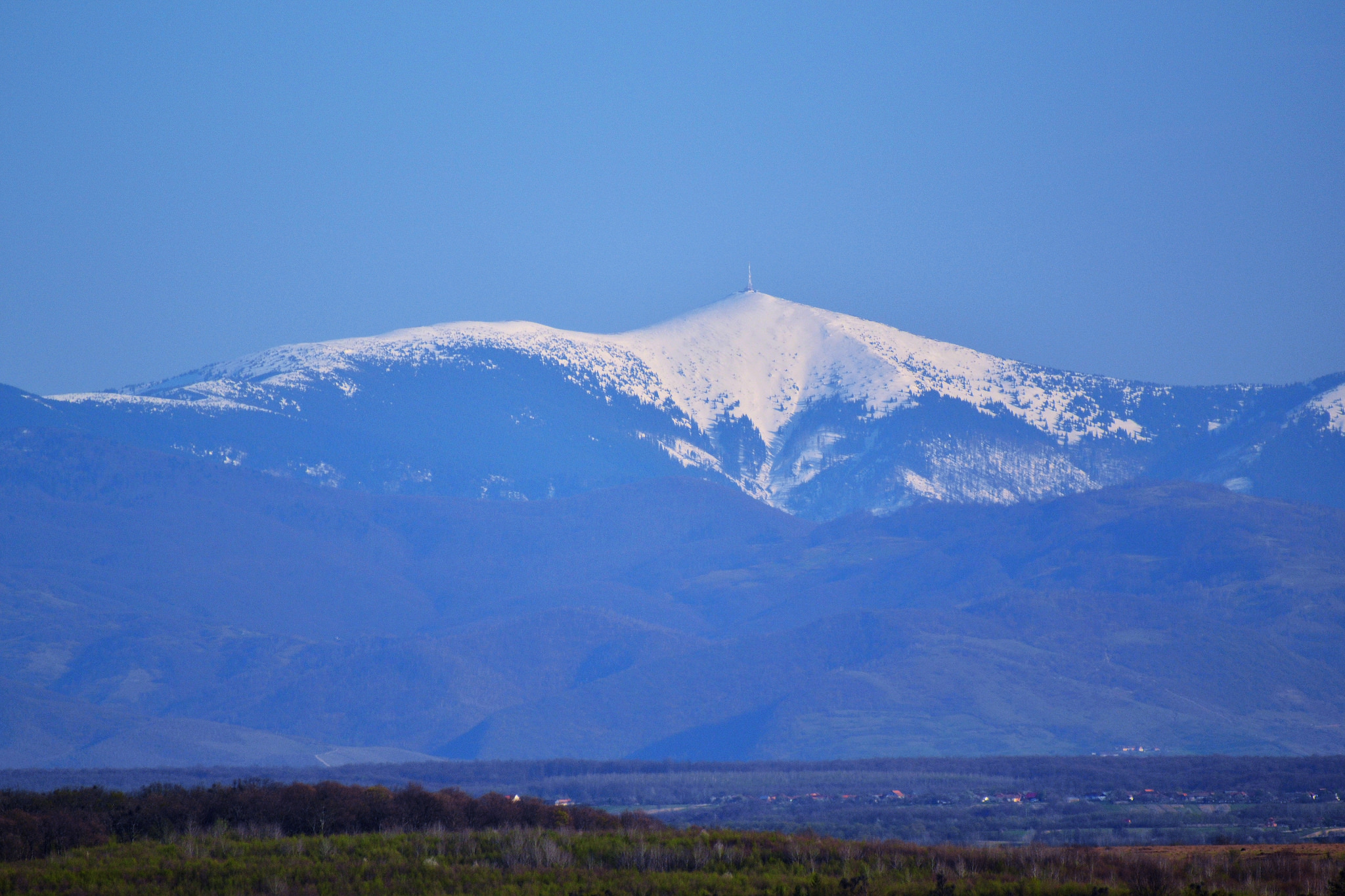
The Cucurbăta Mare, the highest peak in the Bihor Mountains

This county has a total area of 7,544 km^{2} (2,913 sq mi). In the eastern side of the county there are the Apuseni Mountains, with the highest peak being the Cucurbăta Mare (also known as the Bihor Peak), at 1,849 m (6,066 ft). The heights decrease westwards, passing through the hills an ending in the Romanian Western Plain – the eastern side of the Pannonian plain.

The county is mainly the Criș hydrographic basin with the rivers Crișul Repede (Sebes Körös), Crișul Negru (Fekete Körös), and Barcău the main rivers.

=== Neighbours ===
- Sălaj County (Szilágy), Cluj County (Kolozs), and Alba County (Fehér) in the East.
- Hungary in the West – Hajdú-Bihar County, Békés County and Szabolcs–Szatmár–Bereg County
- Satu Mare County (Szatmár) in the North.
- Arad County in the South.

== History ==
Prior to World War I, the territory of the county belonged to Austria-Hungary and mostly was contained in the Bihar County of the Kingdom of Hungary. After the collapse of Austria-Hungary at the end of the war, and the declaration of the Union of Transylvania with Romania, the Romanian Army took control of the county in April 1919, during the Hungarian–Romanian War. The territory of Bihor County was officially transferred to the Kingdom of Romania from Hungary as successor state to Austria-Hungary in 1920 under the Treaty of Trianon. After the administrative unification law in 1925, the name of the county remained as it was, but the territory was reorganized.

In 1938, King Carol II promulgated a new Constitution, and subsequently he had the administrative division of the Romanian territory changed. Ten ținuturi (approximate translation: "lands") were created (by merging the counties) to be ruled by rezidenți regali (approximate translation: "Royal Residents") – appointed directly by the king – instead of the prefects. Bihor County became part of Ținutul Crișuri.

In August 1940, under the auspices of Nazi Germany, which imposed the Second Vienna Award, Hungary retook the territory of Northern Transylvania (which included part of the county) from Romania. In October 1944, Romanian forces with Soviet assistance recaptured the ceded territory and reintegrated it into Romania. Romanian jurisdiction over the entire county per the Treaty of Trianon was reaffirmed in the Paris Peace Treaties, 1947. In September 1950, the county was disestablished by the communist government of Romania and was replaced by the Bihor Region, whose territory comprised an area similar to the old county. Bihor County was re-established in February 1968, when Romania restored the county administrative system.

== Economy ==
Bihor is one of the wealthiest counties in Romania, with a GDP per capita well above the national average. Recently, the economy has been driven by a number of construction projects. Bihor has the lowest unemployment rate in Romania and among the lowest in Europe, with only 2.4% unemployment, compared to Romania's average of 5.1%.

The predominant industries in the county are:

- Textile industry.
- Food and beverages industry.
- Mechanical components industry.
- Metallurgy.

In the west side of the county there are mines for extracting coal and bauxite. Crude oil is also extracted.

== Tourism ==
The main tourist attractions in the county are:

- The city of Oradea.
- The Apuseni Mountains (Erdélyi-középhegység):
  - The Stâna de Vale resort and the Iad River valley.
  - The Caves around Padiș and on the Sighiștel River valley.
  - The Bear's Cave.
- Băile Felix Resort.

== Demographics ==
According to the 2021 census, the county had a population of 551,297 and the population density was 73.1/km^{2} (189.3/sq mi). 51.1% of its population lives in urban areas, lower than the Romanian average.

Ethnic composition of Bihor County (2021)
1. Romanians (69.0%)
2. Hungarians (22.4%)
3. Romani (7.33%)
4. Slovaks (0.97%)
5. Germans (Sathmar Swabians) (0.11%)
6. Others (0.22%)
Religious composition of Bihor County (2021)
1. Romanian Orthodox (59.3%)
2. Reformed (16.0%)
3. Pentecostals (8.16%)
4. Roman Catholics (8.01%)
5. Baptists (4.28%)
6. Greek Catholics (1.99%)
7. Others (1.36%)
8. Irreligious, atheist and agnostic (0.91%)

Year	County population
1948	536,323
1956	574,488 ▲
1966	586,460 ▲
1977	633,094 ▲
1992	634,093 ▲
2002	600,246 ▼
2011	575,398 ▼
2021	551,297 ▼

== Politics and administration ==
The Bihor County Council is led by Mircea Mălan, who has held office since March 2025, after Ilie Bolojan became acting President of Romania. Renewed at the 2024 local elections, the Bihor County Council consists of 34 counsellors, with the following party composition:

Party	Seats	Current County Council
National Liberal Party (PNL)	22	
Democratic Alliance of Hungarians (UDMR/RMDSZ)	6	
Social Democratic Party (PSD)	6	

== Administrative divisions ==
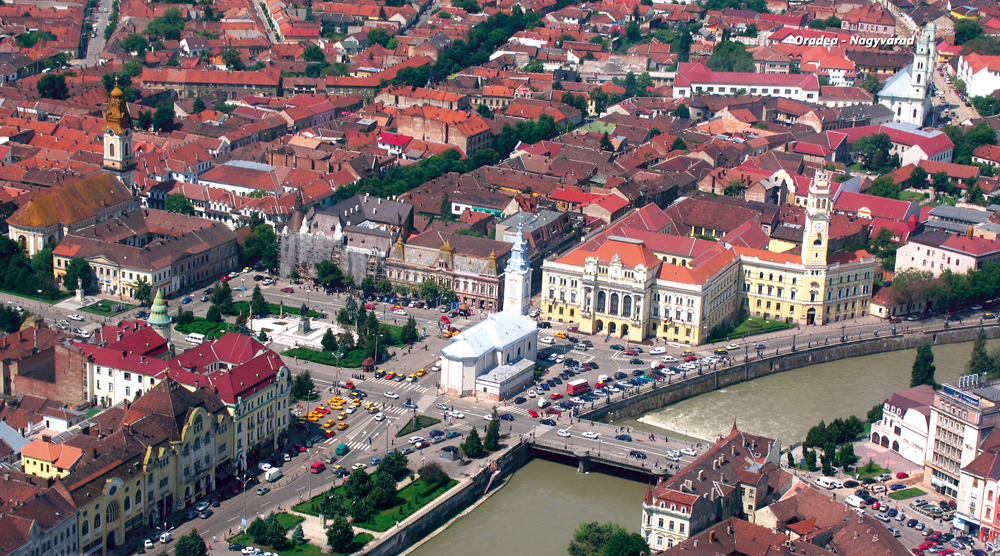
Oradea

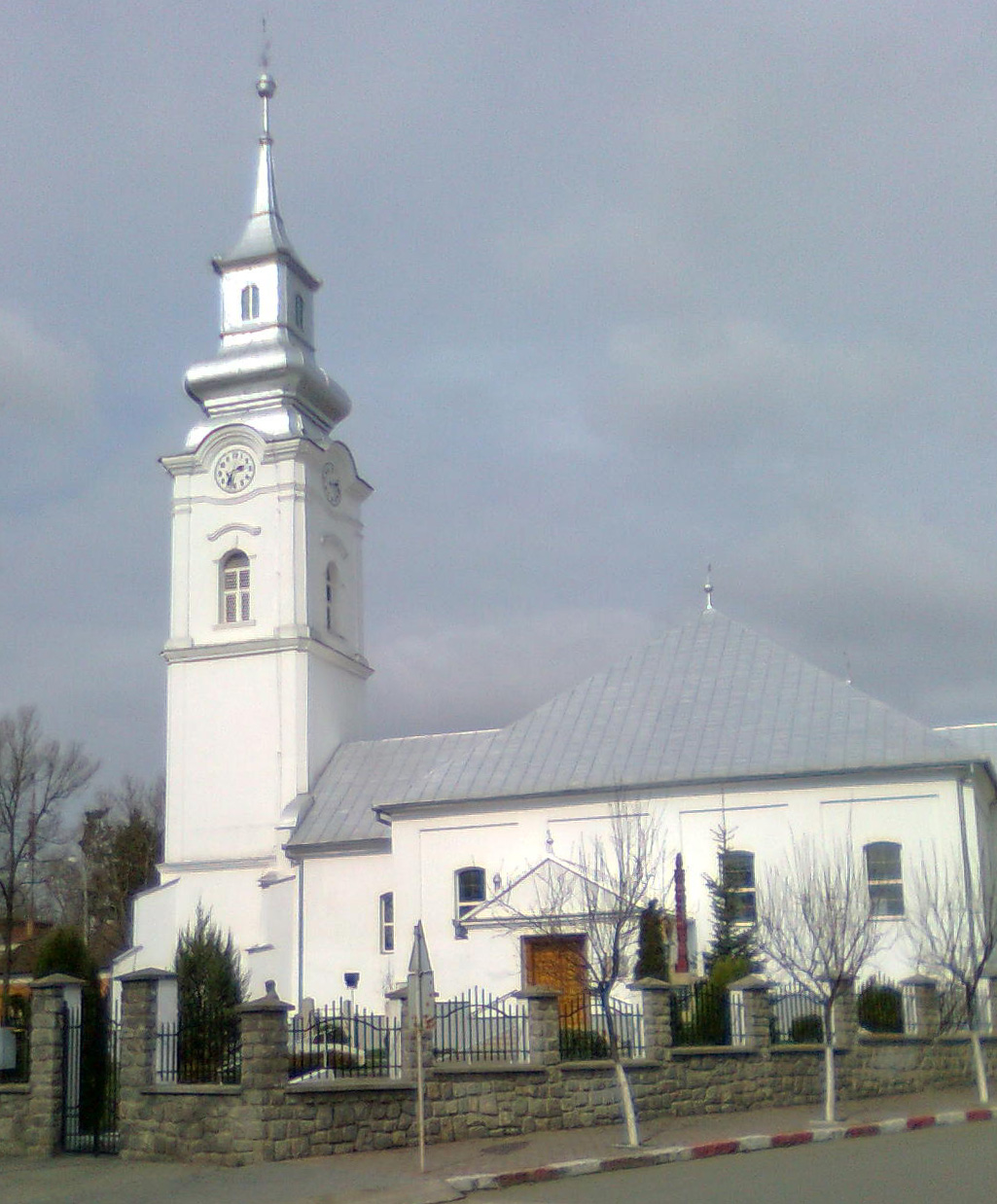
Marghita

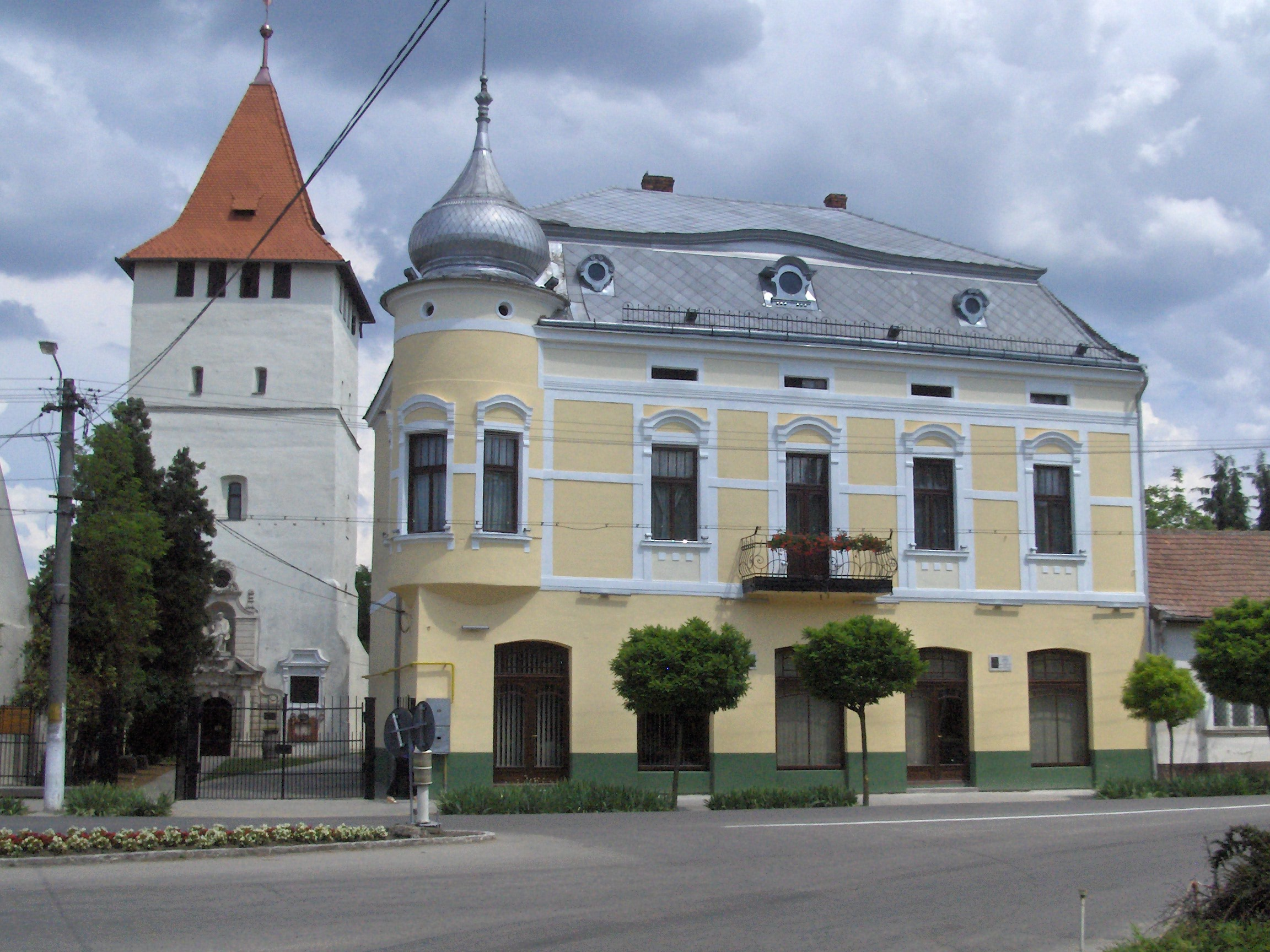
Salonta

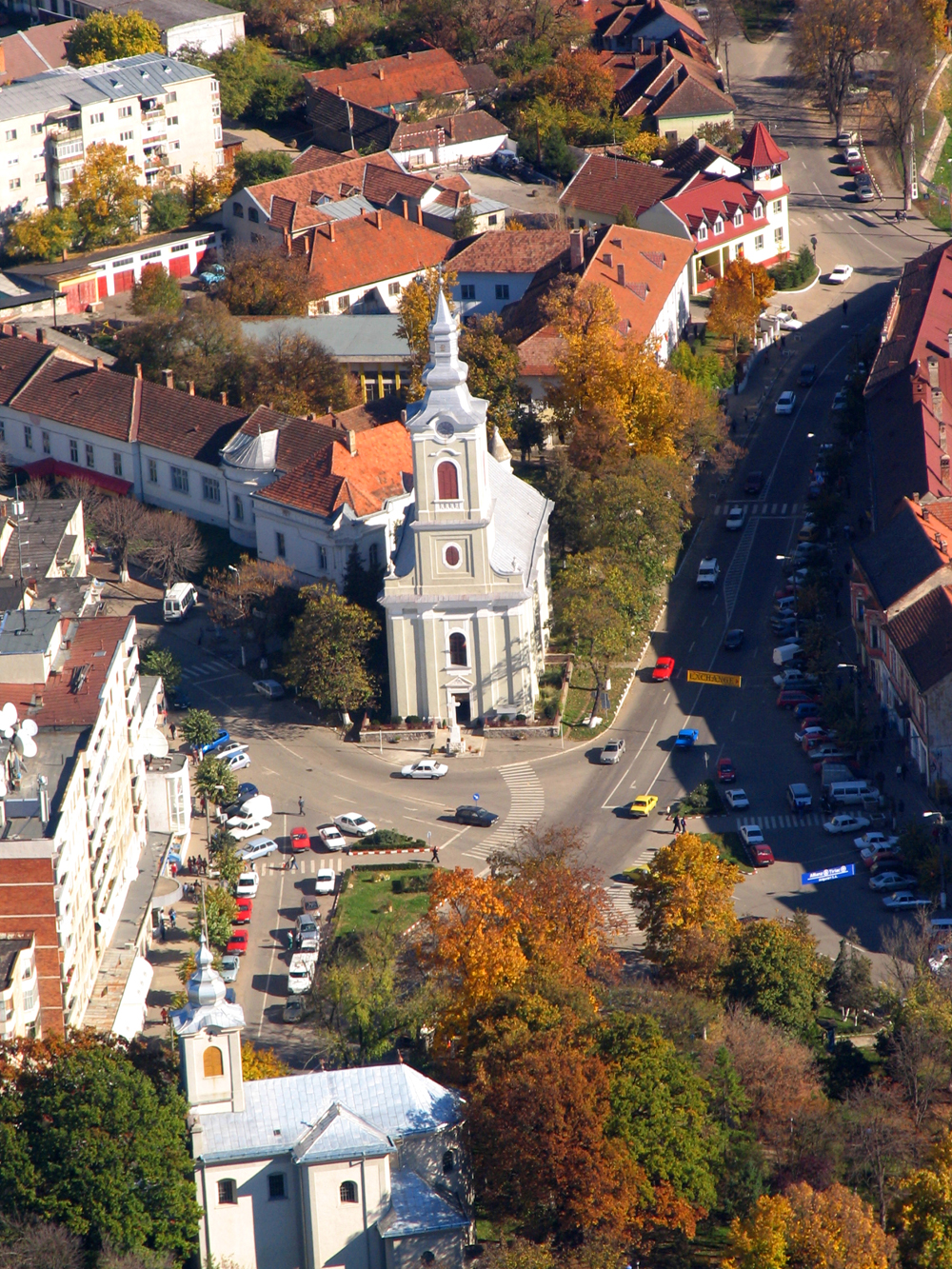
Beiuș

Bihor County has four municipalities, six towns, and 91 communes. Municipalities

- Beiuș
- Marghita
- Oradea – capital city; 183,105 (as of 2021)
- Salonta

Towns

- Aleșd
- Nucet
- Săcueni
- Ștei
- Valea lui Mihai
- Vașcău

Communes

- Abram
- Aștileu
- Aușeu
- Avram Iancu
- Balc
- Batăr
- Biharia
- Boianu Mare
- Borod
- Borș
- Bratca
- Brusturi
- Budureasa
- Buduslău
- Bulz
- Buntești
- Căbești
- Câmpani
- Căpâlna
- Cărpinet
- Cefa
- Ceica
- Cetariu
- Cherechiu
- Chișlaz
- Ciumeghiu
- Cociuba Mare
- Copăcel
- Criștioru de Jos
- Curățele
- Curtuișeni
- Derna
- Diosig
- Dobreşti
- Drăgănești
- Drăgești
- Finiș
- Gepiu
- Girișu de Criș
- Hidişelu de Sus
- Holod
- Husasău de Tinca
- Ineu
- Lăzăreni
- Lazuri de Beiuș
- Lugașu de Jos
- Lunca
- Mădăras
- Măgești
- Nojorid
- Olcea
- Oșorhei
- Paleu
- Petreu
- Pietroasa
- Pocola
- Pomezeu
- Popești
- Răbăgani
- Remetea
- Rieni
- Roșia
- Roșiori
- Sâmbăta
- Sâniob
- Sânnicolau Român
- Sânmartin
- Sântandrei
- Sârbi
- Săcădat
- Sălacea
- Sălard
- Spinuș
- Suplacu de Barcău
- Șimian
- Șinteu
- Șoimi
- Șuncuiuș
- Tămășeu
- Tărcaia
- Tarcea
- Tăuteu
- Tileagd
- Tinca
- Toboliu
- Tulca
- Țețchea
- Uileacu de Beiuș
- Vadu Crișului
- Vârciorog
- Viișoara

== Historical county ==
Județul Bihor
- County (Județ)
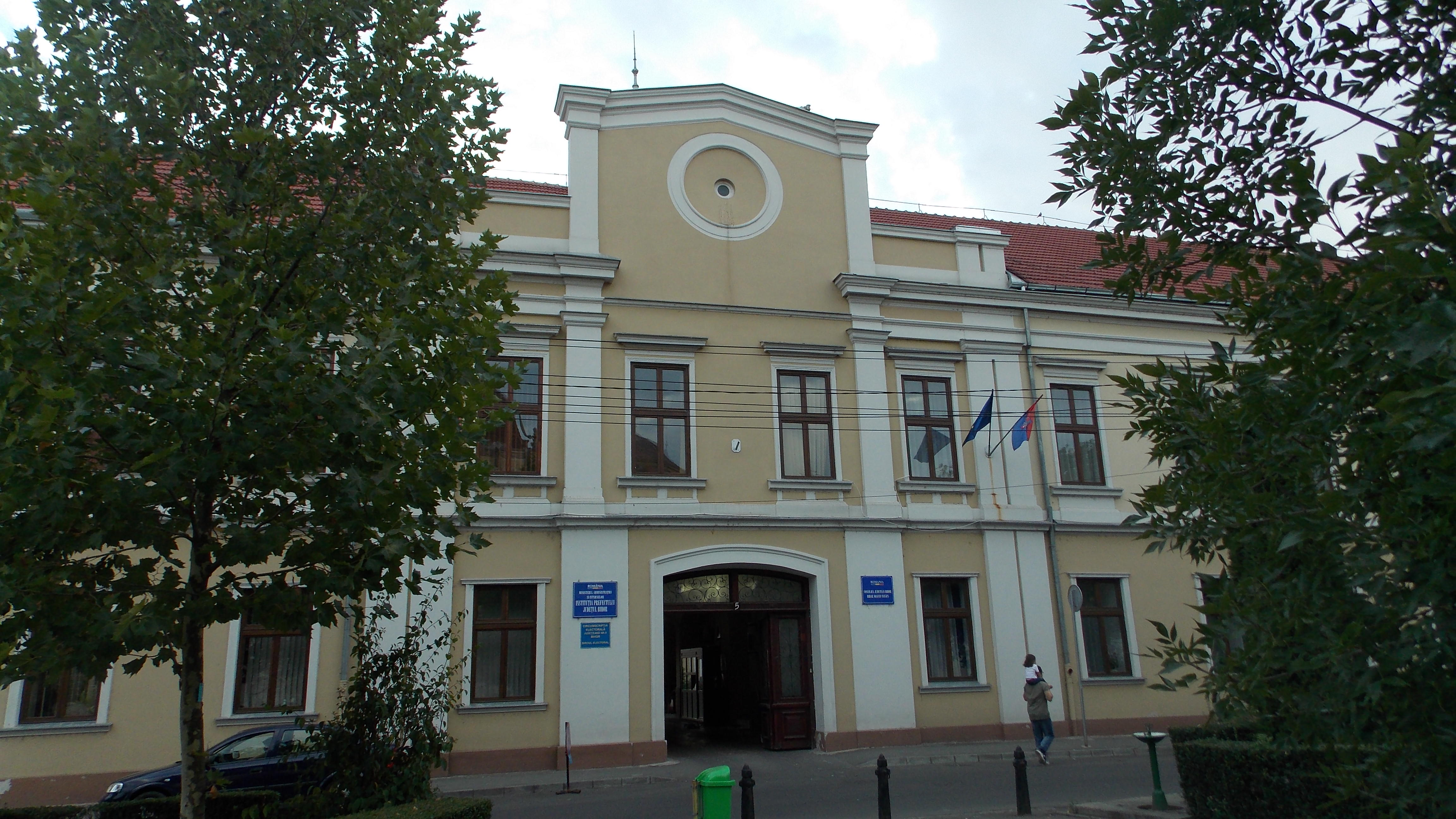
- The Bihor County Prefecture building from the interwar period, used until 1920

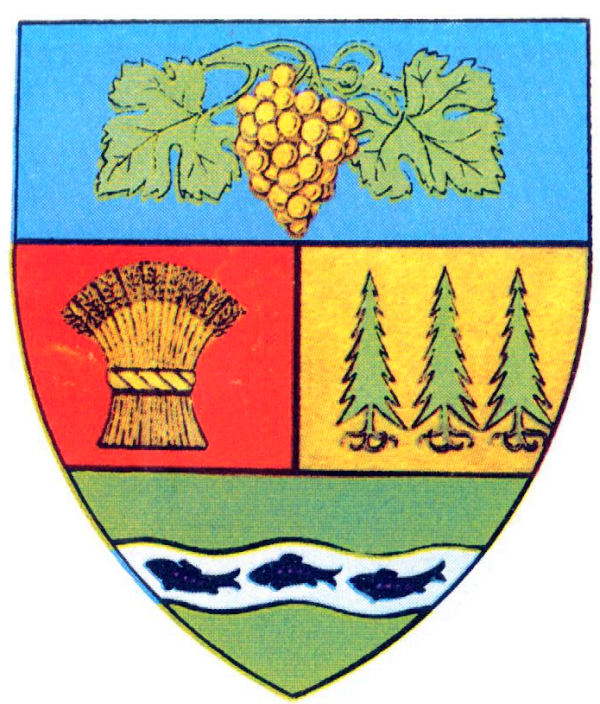
- Coat of arms

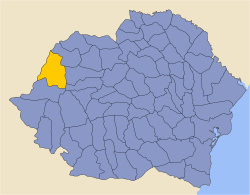
- Country: Romania
- Historic region: Crișana
- Capital city (Reședință de județ): Oradea

Area
  - Total: 7,467 km^{2} (2,883 sq mi)

Population (1930)
  - Total: 510,318
  - Density: 68.34/km^{2} (177.0/sq mi)
- Time zone: UTC+2 (EET)
  - Summer (DST): UTC+3 (EEST)

=== Administration ===
The territory of the county was divided into twelve districts (plăși)

1. Plasa Aleșd (comprising 41 villages, headquartered at Aleșd)
2. Plasa Beiuș (comprising 62 villages, headquartered at Beiuș)
3. Plasa Beliu (comprising 30 villages, headquartered at Beliu)
4. Plasa Ceica (comprising 47 villages, headquartered at Ceica)
5. Plasa Centrală (comprising 40 villages, headquartered at Oradea)
6. Plasa Marghita (comprising 43 villages, headquartered at Marghita)
7. Plasa Salonta (comprising 19 villages, headquartered at Salonta)
8. Plasa Săcueni (comprising 11 villages, headquartered at Săcueni)
9. Plasa Sălard (comprising 28 villages, headquartered at Sălard)
10. Plasa Tileagd (comprising 28 villages, headquartered at Tileagd)
11. Plasa Tinca (comprising 26 villages, headquartered at Tinca)
12. Plasă Vașcău (comprising 44 villages, headquartered at Vașcău)

Within Bihor County there were three urban localities: Oradea (also known as Oradea Mare, the county seat) and urban communes Salonta and Beiuș.

=== Population ===
According to the 1930 census data, the county population was 510,318, ethnically divided among Romanians (61.6%), Hungarians (30.0%), Jews (4.3%), Czechs and Slovaks (2.2%), as well as other minorities. By language the county was divided among Romanian (61.4%), Hungarian (33.8%), Czech (2.0%), Yiddish (1.5%), as well as other minorities. From the religious point of view, the population consisted of Eastern Orthodox (49.8%), Reformed (21.0%), Greek Catholics (10.7%), Roman Catholics (10.4%), Jews (5.4%), Baptists (2.2%), as well as other minorities.

==== Urban population ====
The county's urban population consisted of 102,277 inhabitants, 54.8% Hungarians, 26.4% Romanians, 15.4% Jews, 1% Germans, as well as other minorities. As a mother tongue in the urban population, Hungarian (67.9%) predominated, followed by Romanian (24.9%), Yiddish (4.3%), German (1.2%), as well as other minorities. From the religious point of view, the urban population consisted of 31.5% Reformed, 20.6% Jewish, 19.3% Roman Catholic, 17.5% Eastern Orthodox, 9.1% Greek Catholic, 1.1% Lutheran, as well as other minorities.

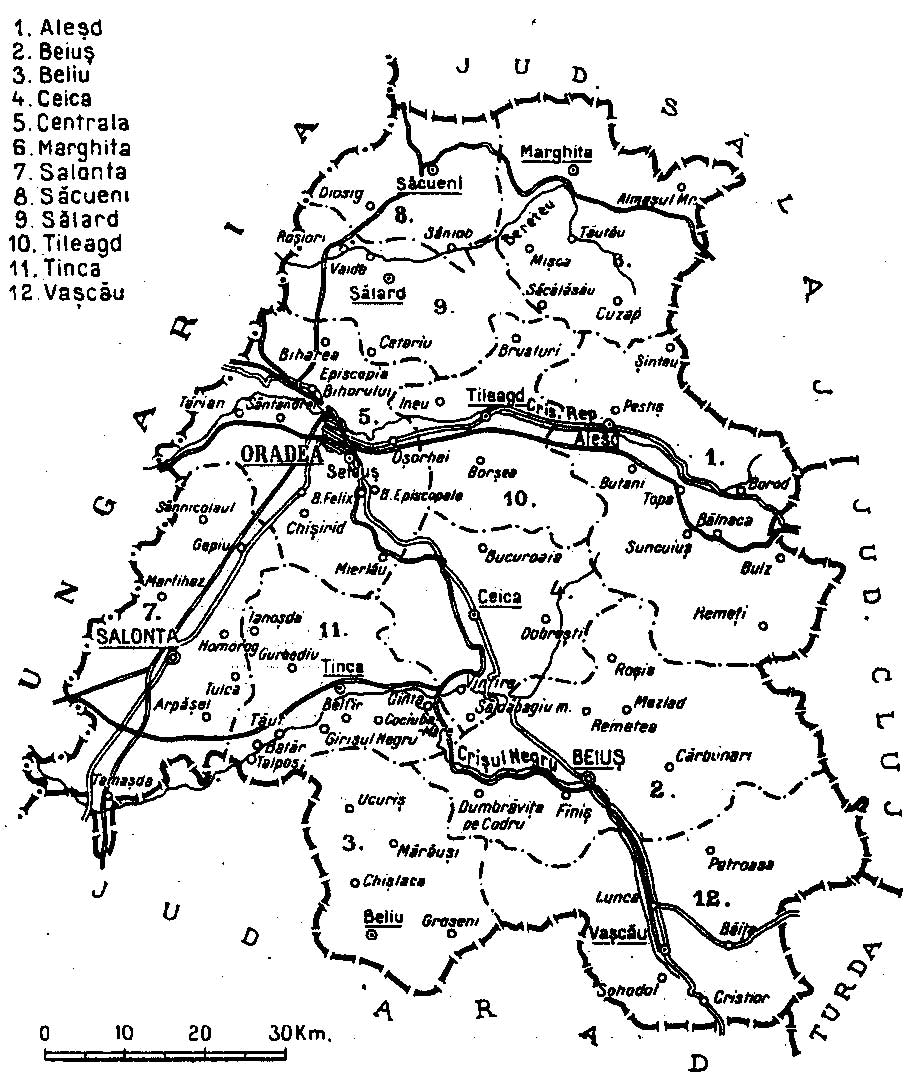
Map of Bihor County as constituted in 1938
