= Criș Collector Canal =

- Interactive map of Criș Collector Canal

Specifications
- Length: 61.8 km (38.4 mi)
- Maximum height AMSL: 96 m (315 ft)
- Minimum height AMSL: 89 m (292 ft)

Geography
- Start point: Crișul Repede at Tărian, Romania
- End point: Crișul Negru at Tămașda, Romania
- Beginning coordinates: 47.0880°N 21.7841°E
- Ending coordinates: 46.6497°N 21.5786°E

The Criș Collector Canal (Romanian: Canalul Colector Criș) is the main canal of the drainage system of the area between the Crișul Repede and the Crișul Negru in Bihor County, western Romania. The lower reach of the canal is also known as Tămașda Collector Canal (Romanian: Canalul Corector Tămașda).

The canal starts from the Crișul Repede near the village of Tărian, 10 km west of Oradea, and flows into the Crișul Negru upstream of the village of Tămașda. It is 61.8 km (38.4 mi) long. The canal intercepts the drainage canals and rivers flowing westward between the two main rivers, including Corhana, Velju Mare and Veljul Negreștilor. It passes through the villages of Tărian, Toboliu, Roit, Sânnicolau Român, Cefa, Homorog, Arpășel, Ghiorac, Boiu and Tămașda.
