= Corhana =

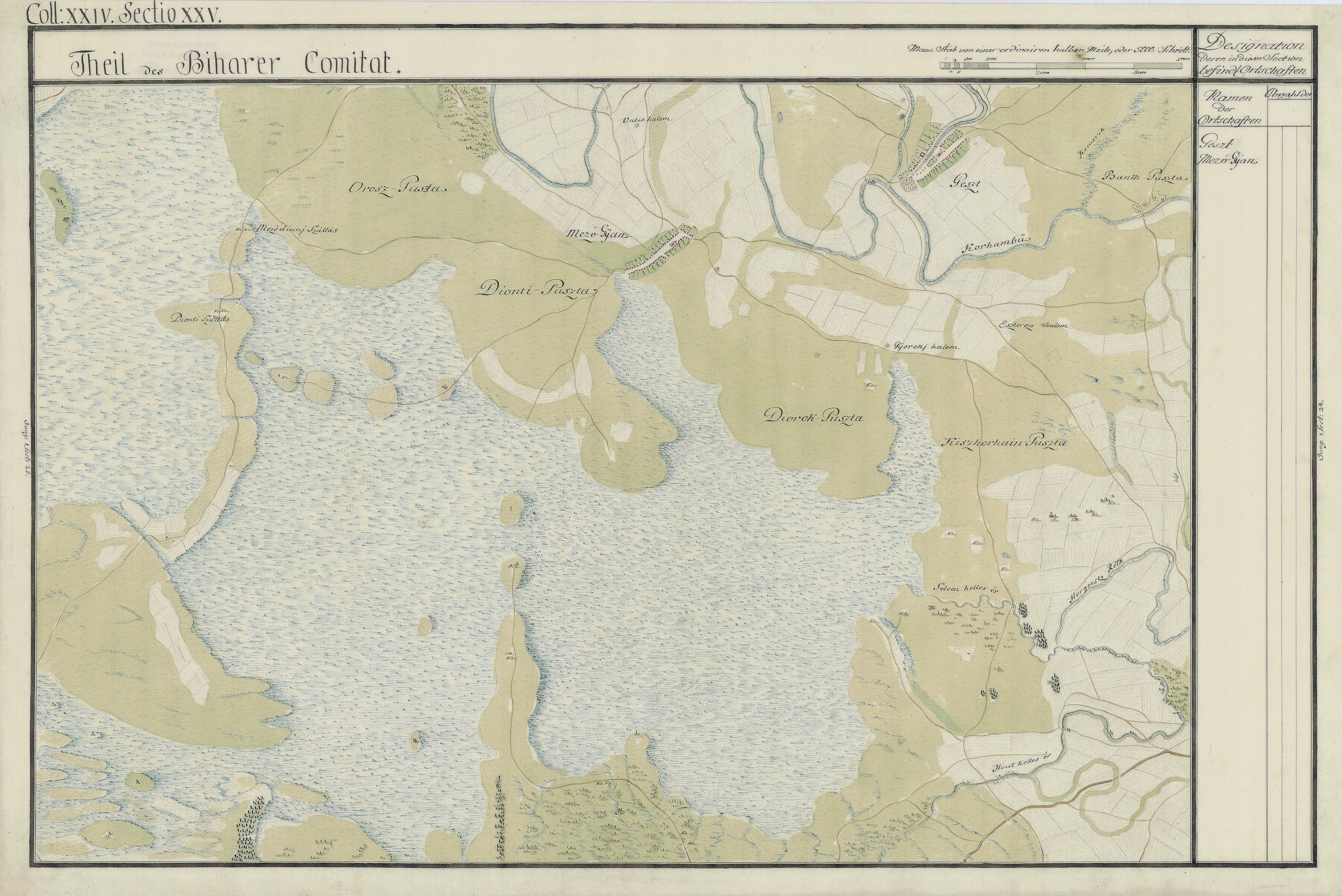

- Location within Romania Location within Hungary

Location
- Country: Romania, Hungary
- Counties: Bihor County, Békés County
- Villages: Romania: Miersig, Bicaci, Inand, Marțihaz; Hungary: Geszt

Physical characteristics
- Source
  - coordinates: 46°54′57″N 21°55′31″E
  - elevation: 232 m (761 ft)
- Mouth: Crișul Repede

Basin features
- Progression: Crișul Repede→ Körös→ Tisza→ Danube→ Black Sea
- Tributaries
  - left: Valea cea Mare, Sititelec, Velju Mare
  - right: Gepiu, Canaliș

The Corhana (Romanian: Corhana, Hungarian: Korhány) is a river in western Romania and eastern Hungary, a tributary of the Crișul Repede. Its source is 2 km south of the village Șauaieu. It flows in western direction towards Cefa, where much of its flow is diverted by the Criș Collector Canal towards the Crișul Negru near Tămașda. Part of its flow continues west and crosses the Hungarian border between Marțihaz and Geszt. The river is diverted into the canals of the drainage system of the area. The meanders of the Korhány near Geszt are a Natura 2000 site.
