= Protected areas of Romania =

Geography of Romania
Topography

Carpathians (peaks)
Plains & Delta
Islands

Hydrography

Rivers (Danube)
Lakes
Black Sea

Climate

This is a list of protected areas of Romania.

About 5.18% of the area of Romania has a protected status (12,360 km^{2}), including the Danube Delta, which makes half of these areas (2.43% of Romania's area).

== National parks ==
There are 14 national parks totaling 3,223 km^{2}:

National park listed in UNESCO World Heritage
National park included in UNESCO's Man and the Biosphere Programme

Name	Location (county)	Area (ha)	Year of establishment	Year of declaration	Image	Website
Buila-Vânturarița	Vâlcea	4,186	2005	2005		buila.ro
Călimani	Mureș, Suceava, Harghita, Bistrița-Năsăud	24,041	1975	2000		calimani.ro
Ceahlău	Neamț	7,742.5	1995	2000		ceahlaupark.ro
Cheile Bicazului-Hășmaș	Harghita, Neamț	6,575	1990	2000		cheilebicazului-hasmas.ro
Cheile Nerei-Beușnița	Caraș-Severin	36,758	1990	2000		cheilenereibeusnita.ro
Cozia	Vâlcea	17,100	1966	2000		cozia.ro
Danube Delta	Tulcea	446,100(on Romanian territory)	1991	2000		ddbra.ro
Domogled-Valea Cernei	Caraș-Severin, Mehedinți, Gorj	61,211	1982	2000		domogled-cerna.ro
Jiu Valley	Gorj, Hunedoara	11,127	2005	2005		defileuljiului.ro
Măcin Mountains	Tulcea	11,151.82	2000	2000		parcmacin.ro
Rodna Mountains	Bistrița-Năsăud, Maramureș	47,177	1990	2000		parcrodna.ro
Piatra Craiului	Argeș, Brașov	14,773	1938	2000		pcrai.ro
Retezat	Hunedoara	38,047	1935	2000		retezat.ro
Semenic-Cheile Carașului	Caraș-Severin	36,664	1982	2000		pnscc.ro

=== Proposed hunting ===
The Romanian parliament discussed in September 2008 a bill aiming to open 13 national parks to sustainable hunting, in order to manage the wildlife biodiversity in these areas and promote greater tourism and the accompanying revenue necessary to support and maintain the parks. However, after several protests from environmental organizations, the law was rejected by President Traian Băsescu. Nowadays, hunting is prohibited in national parks of Romania.

== Natural parks ==
There are 17 natural parks totaling 5,492.33 km^{2}:

Prizewinning natural park during the EDEN Awards Gala (8 October 2009)
Natural park included in the European Network and member of the Global Geoparks Network under the auspices of UNESCO
Biosphere reserve

Name	Location (county)	Area (ha)	Year of establishment	Year of declaration	Image	Website
Apuseni	Alba, Bihor, Cluj	75,784	1990	2000		
Brăila Small Puddle	Brăila	17,529	1978	2000		bmb.ro
Bucegi	Brașov, Dâmbovița, Prahova	32,663	1974	2000		bucegipark.ro
Cefa	Bihor	5,002	2010	2010		
Cindrel	Sibiu	9,873	2000	2000		
Comana	Giurgiu	24,963	2005	2005		comanaparc.ro
Dumbrava Sibiului	Sibiu	993	1963	2000		
Grădiștea Muncelului-Cioclovina	Hunedoara	38,184	1979	2000		gradiste.ro
Hațeg Country Dinosaur Geopark	Hunedoara	1,023.92	2005	2005		hateggeoparc.ro
Iron Gates	Caraș-Severin, Mehedinți	115,665.8	1990	2000		pnportiledefier.ro
Lower Prut Floodplain	Galați	8,247	2005	2005		
Maramureș Mountains	Maramureș	148,850	2004	2004		muntiimaramuresului.ro
Mehedinți Plateau Geopark	Gorj, Mehedinți	106.5	2005	2005		
Mureș Floodplain	Arad	171.66	2005	2005		luncamuresului.ro
Putna-Vrancea	Vrancea	30,204	2004	2004		putnavrancea.ro
Upper Mureș Defile	Mureș	9,156	2007	2007		
Vânători-Neamț	Neamț	30,818	1999	2000		vanatoripark.ro

== Natural reserves ==
Natural reserves are natural areas protected by law in order to protect and conserve important habitats and natural species. The dimensions of natural reserves vary and depend on the area needed by protected natural elements. Besides scientific activities, the administrations of natural reserves encourage traditional activities and ecotourism that do not affect the natural landscape. Here is not permitted to use natural resources.

There are 617 natural reservations totaling 2,043.55 km^{2}.

== Scientific reserves ==
Scientific reserves are also protected areas that, like the previous ones, aim at protection and preservation of natural habitats. The difference is that scientific reserves can not be visited by tourists. These areas typically contain rare plant and animal species or particular natural elements, reason why here are prohibited any human activities, excepting research and education activities. Entry without permission in scientific reserves is punishable by considerable fines.

There are 55 such reservations totaling 1,112.77 km^{2}.

== Natural monuments ==
There are 234 natural monuments totaling 77.05 km^{2}.
