= Valea Nesecată =

- Location within Romania

Location
- Country: Romania
- Counties: Bihor County
- Villages: Șauaieu

Physical characteristics
- Source: Dâmbu Hill
  - coordinates: 46°55′25″N 21°57′11″E
  - elevation: 245 m (804 ft)
- Mouth: Gepiu
  - coordinates: 46°55′16″N 21°49′09″E
  - elevation: 113 m (371 ft)

Basin features
- Progression: Gepiu→ Corhana→ Crișul Repede→ Körös→ Tisza→ Danube→ Black Sea

The Valea Nesecată is a left tributary of the river Gepiu in Romania. It flows into the Gepiu near the village Gepiu.
