= Gepiu (river) =

- Location within Romania

Location
- Country: Romania
- Counties: Bihor County
- Villages: Șauaieu, Păușa, Gepiu, Inand

Physical characteristics
- Source
  - coordinates: 46°55′58″N 22°00′20″E
  - elevation: 275 m (902 ft)
- Mouth: Corhana
  - location: Inand
  - coordinates: 46.9007°N 21.7461°E
  - elevation: 96 m (315 ft)
- Length: 27 km (17 mi)

Basin features
- Progression: Corhana→ Crișul Repede→ Körös→ Tisza→ Danube→ Black Sea
- Tributaries
  - left: Orăscu, Valea Nesecată
  - right: Varieș

The Gepiu is a river in Bihor County, Romania. Its source is near Șauaieu. Near Inand it discharges into the Corhana. Various reaches of the river are known under different names such as Pruniște River, Valea Cireșului River, Calaboj River, Sămăroaga River or Rădăoli River. Its length is 27 km (17 mi).
