= Veljul Negreștilor =

- Location within Romania

Location
- Country: Romania
- Counties: Bihor County
- Villages: Ianoșda, Homorog

Physical characteristics
- Source: near Ianoșda
  - coordinates: 46°50′08″N 21°49′38″E
  - elevation: 123 m (404 ft)
- Mouth: Velju Mare
  - location: near Mădăras
  - coordinates: 46.8488°N 21.7041°E

Basin features
- Progression: Velju Mare→ Corhana→ Crișul Repede→ Körös→ Tisza→ Danube→ Black Sea
- Tributaries
  - left: Valea din Pustă
  - right: Veljul Pustei

The Veljul Negreștilor is a left tributary of the river Velju Mare in Romania. It flows into the Velju Mare near Mădăras. Near Homorog much of its flow is diverted by the Criș Collector Canal towards the Crișul Negru near Tămașda.
