= Veljul River =

Veljul River may refer to:

- Velju Mare, in Bihor County, Romania
- Veljul Mic, a tributary of the Velju Mare in Bihor County, Romania
- Veljul Negreștilor, a tributary of the Velju Mare in Bihor County, Romania
- Veljul Pustei, a tributary of the Veljul Negreștilor in Bihor County, Romania
- Veljul Selișteoara, a tributary of the Valea Nouă Chișer in Arad County, Romania
