= Cindrel Natural Park =

Protected area in Romania

- Parcul Natural Cindrel
- IUCN category V (protected landscape/seascape)
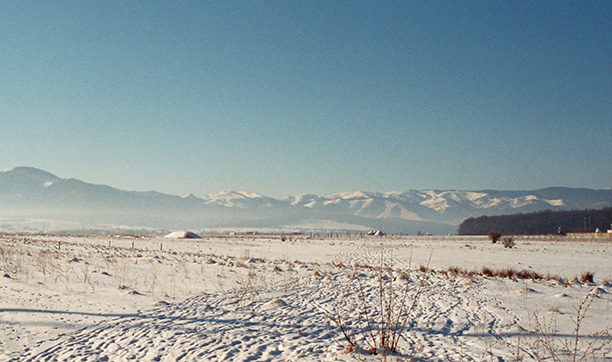
- Cindrel Mountains

- Location within Romania
- Location: Romania; Sibiu County
- Nearest city: Cisnădie
- Coordinates: 45.555°N 23.782°E
- Area: 9.873 hectares (24.40 acres)
- Established: 2000

The Cindrel Natural Park (Romanian: Parcul Natural Cindrel) is a protected area (natural park category V IUCN) situated in Romania, on the administrative territory of Sibiu County.

== See also ==
- Dumbrava Sibiului Natural Park
- Protected areas of Romania
