= Avram Iancu (disambiguation) =

Avram Iancu was a Romanian lawyer known for his participation in the Transylvanian Revolution of 1848–1849.

Avram Iancu may also refer to a number of places or institutions named after him:

== Places ==
- Avram Iancu, Alba, a commune in Alba County, Romania
- Avram Iancu, Bihor, a commune in Bihor County, Romania
- Avram Iancu, a village in Cermei Commune, Arad County, Romania
- Avram Iancu, a village in Vârfurile Commune, Arad County, Romania
- Avram Iancu, a village in Coțușca Commune, Botoşani County, Romania
- Avram Iancu Square, Cluj-Napoca

== Schools ==
- Avram Iancu University, a private university in Cluj-Napoca, Romania
- Avram Iancu High School, a secondary school in Cluj-Napoca, Romania
- Avram Iancu High School, a secondary school in Brad, Romania
- Avram Iancu National College, a secondary school in Câmpeni, Romania
- Avram Iancu National College, a secondary school in Ștei, Romania
- Avram Iancu Technology High School, a secondary technical school in Târgu Mureș, Romania
- Avram Iancu Technical College, a secondary technical school in Aiud, Romania

== Other ==
- Cluj Avram Iancu International Airport, an airport located in Cluj-Napoca, Romania
- Avram Iancu Solar Park, a large thin-film photovoltaic power system near Avram Iancu, Bihor
