= Galați steel works =

Steel mill in Galați, Romania

Coordinates: 45.42764°N 27.97575°E

The Galați steel works (Romanian: Combinatul Siderurgic Galați), formally Liberty Galați (formerly known as ArcelorMittal Galați and Sidex Galați), is a steel mill in Galați, Romania, the country's largest.

== History ==
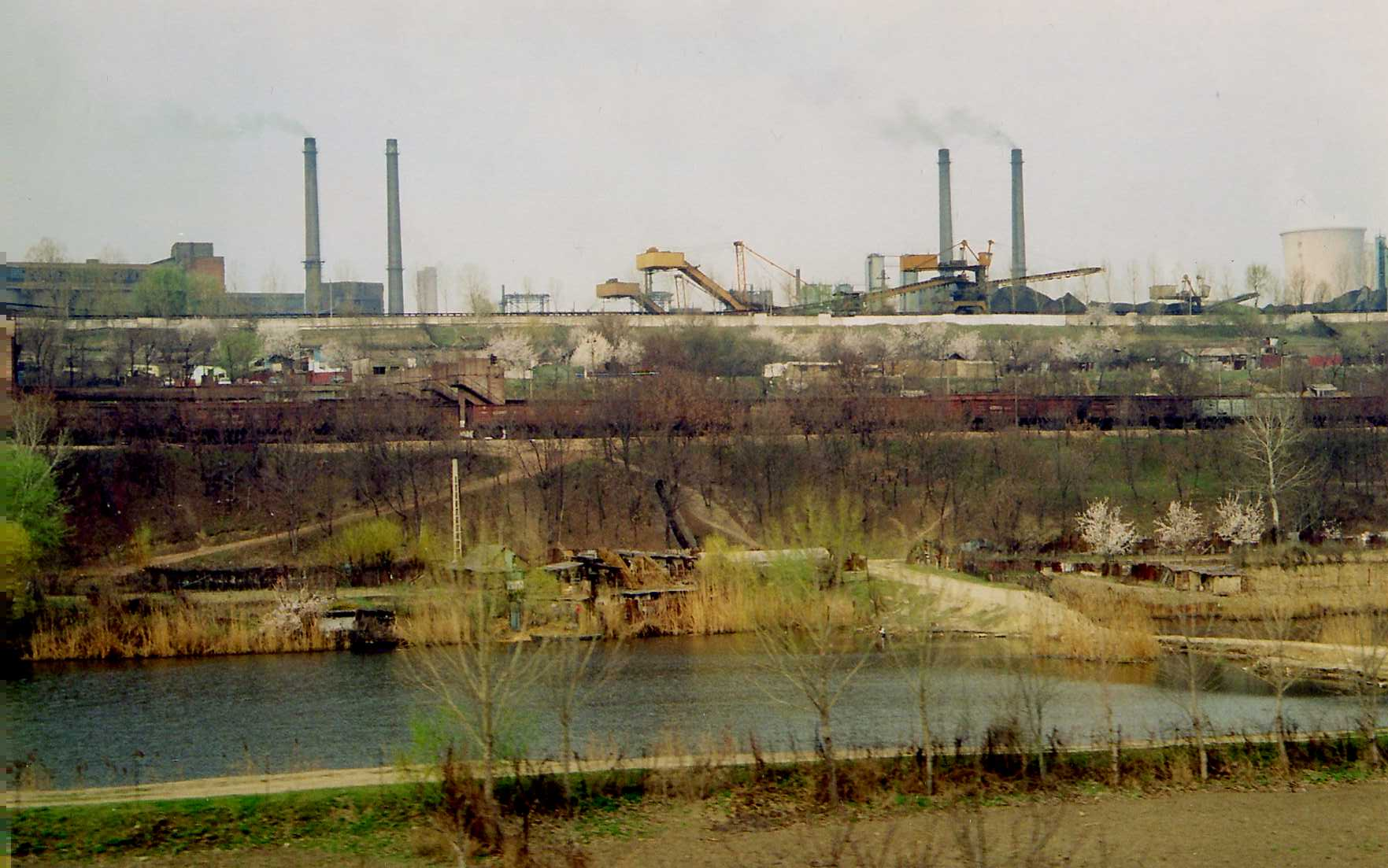
Galați steel works

=== Background ===
The idea of building a large steel works in eastern Romania, with access to the Danube and/or the Black Sea, was first discussed in 1958 at a plenary session of the ruling Romanian Workers' Party. The decision was formalized by a decree in July 1960, shortly after the party's 8th Congress approved a huge investment for the project. At the congress, a heated debate took place over where to situate the plant; some wanted it near Constanța, at Midia or Mangalia, but they were overruled by leader Gheorghe Gheorghiu-Dej, who had roots in Galați. Building the works went against the wishes of the Soviet Union, whose leader Nikita Khrushchev, supported by the more industrialized Czechoslovakia and East Germany, wanted to have the southern part of the Comecon focus on building agrarian economies. Gheorghiu-Dej stridently opposed this notion, and the Soviets' unwillingness to back the project helped foster Romania's opening towards the West.

The 30-year-old director of the metallurgical industry's planning and engineering institute (IPROMET) in Bucharest was chosen to design the construction platform. After a thorough scientific study of air currents, groundwater and the stability of the land, a site was chosen in the city itself rather than in Tulucești or in the area between Galați and Brăila. A special company, ICMRSG, was set up to build the works, hiring over 12,000 workers in six months and emptying entire villages in southern Moldavia and northern Muntenia of laborers. The construction site started to be prepared in July 1960. A year later, after the infrastructure needed by the builders had been set up, digging began. The first building to go up was the mechanical preparations workshop. Construction on the first significant production unit, the sheet rolling machine #1, began in April 1963.

Gheorghiu-Dej died in March 1965, and his successor, Nicolae Ceaușescu, cut the ribbon to the entrance of the works in September 1966. Integrated production began in July 1968, when all the components needed for steel-making had been set up and the first batch of steel came out at steel mill #1. Activity grew at a consistent pace, and by 1972, there were 40,000 employees—over 50,000 in the entire works, including nearby industrial units.

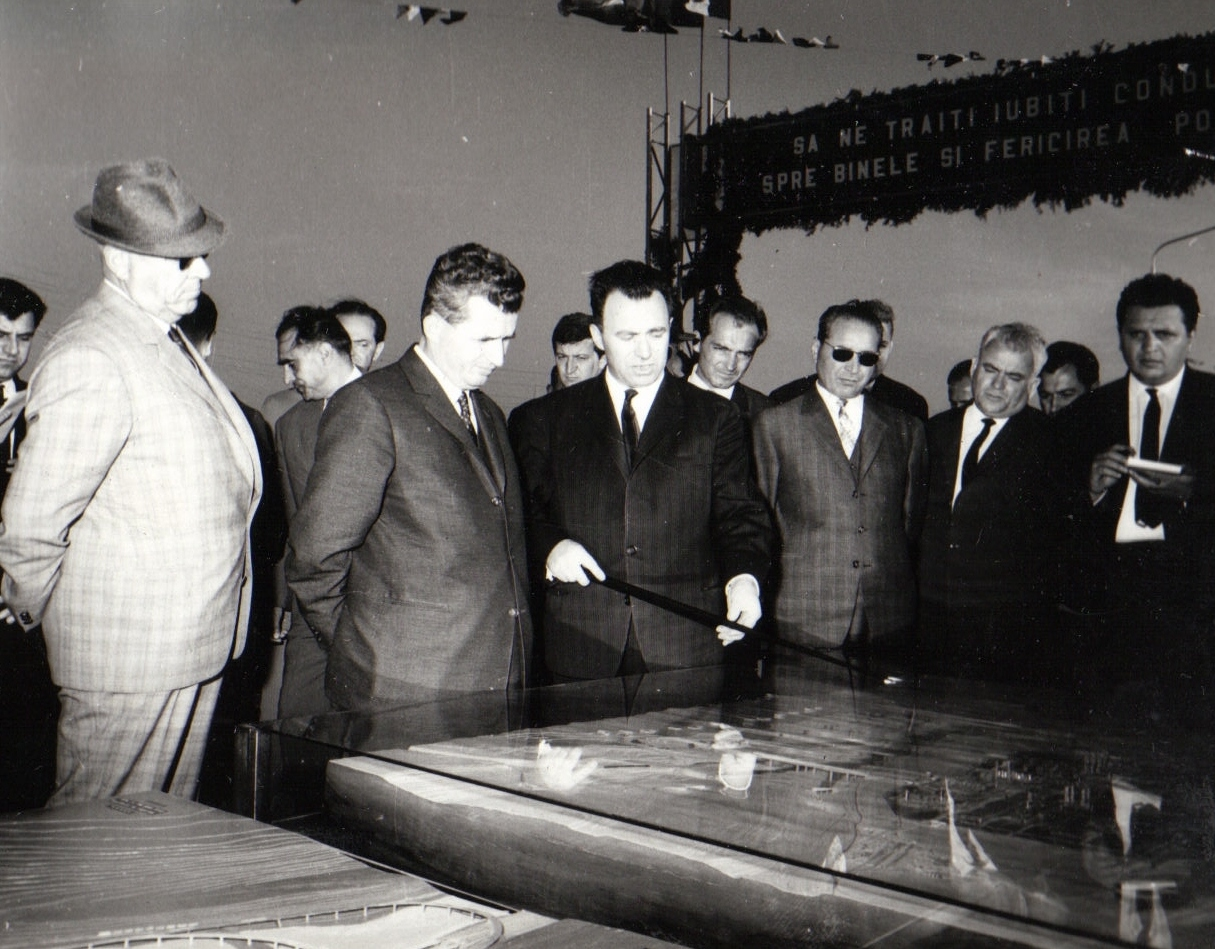
Nicolae Ceaușescu being shown plans of the steel works (1966)

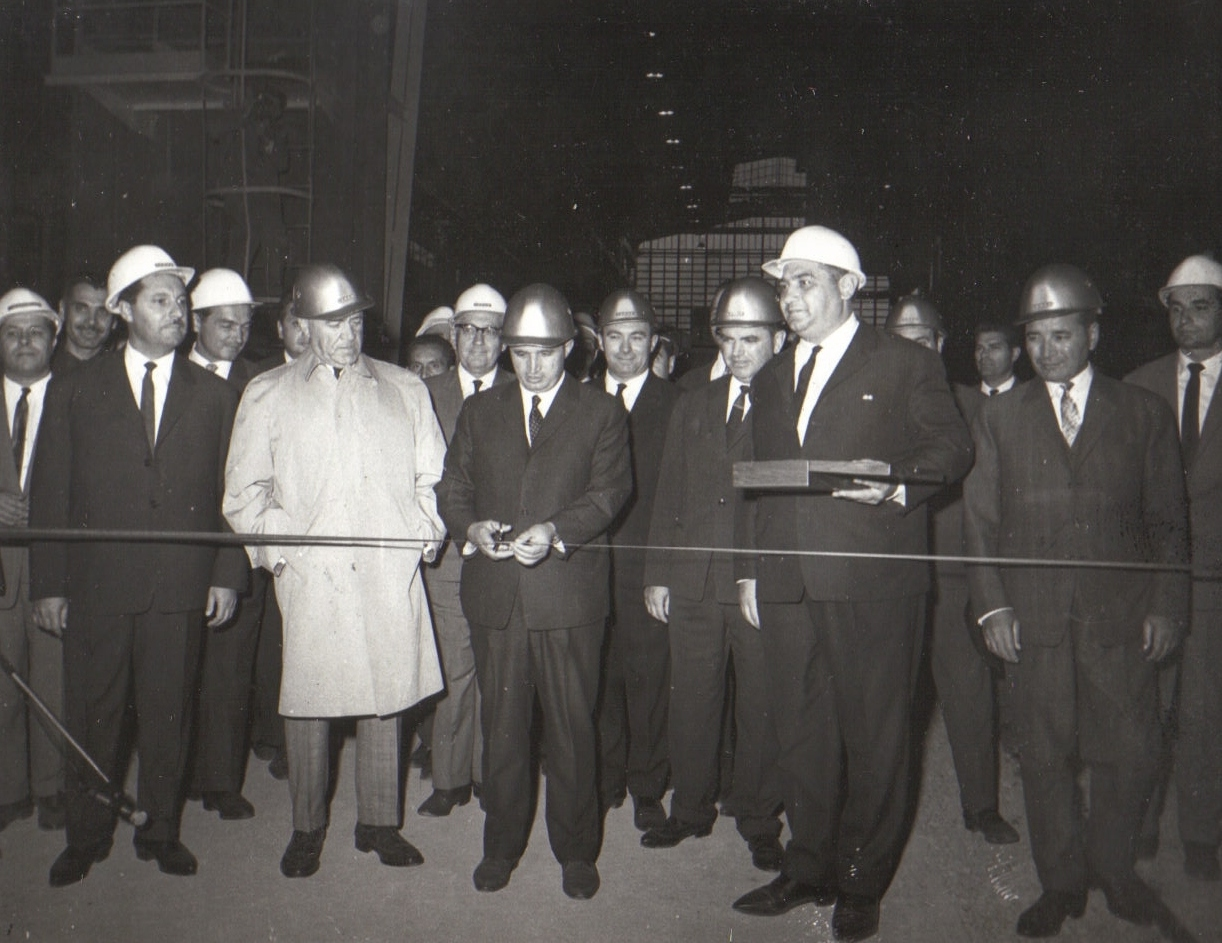
Ceaușescu cutting a ribbon there in the same year

=== Since 1989 ===
The Communist regime fell in 1989, and in 1991, the works became a joint-stock company called Sidex Galați. This was acquired from the Romanian government in 2001 by a Mittal Steel Company subsidiary, and its debts were forgiven. When the latter took over Arcelor in 2006 to form ArcelorMittal, the plant took on the name ArcelorMittal Galați. The number of employees fell from 27,600 in 2001 to 8,700 in 2011, mainly through voluntary retirements coupled with significant bonuses. The privatization of the Galați yard was the first such successful endeavor in the Romanian steel industry, which fared especially well in 2006-2008, thanks to foreign and domestic demand for private infrastructure. However, it suffered a downturn during the Great Recession, and output was 3.5 million tons/year by 2011.

In 2019, the unit was purchased by Liberty House Group, a subsidiary of the GFG Alliance.

== Operations ==
Galați is Romania's largest steel works, and forms an important part of the city's economy. It is also the only one not to use electric arc furnaces, instead relying on iron ore and coal to produce a special type of steel that welds more easily and is thus suitable for making sheet metal. There are two processing plants; five furnaces, including two that run constantly; two steelworks, one of which always runs; three lines for continuous casting; a hot rolling machine and a cold roll one; two sheet metal rollers; and a zinc plating line.

A 2011 study found that two-thirds of Galați residents either worked or used to work at the plant or related factories, or had an immediate family member do so. According to official records, output reached a maximum in 1988, with 8.2 million tons worth some $7.2 billion. By the early 1990s, the works had caused serious air, water and soil pollution in Galați. As of 2010, there were a number of waste disposal lakes behind the works, some containing cyanides, less than 2 km away from the Danube.
