= Velju Mare =

- Source of the Velju Mare

Location
- Country: Romania
- Counties: Bihor County

Physical characteristics
- Source
  - coordinates: 46°51′04″N 21°52′47″E
  - elevation: 153 m (502 ft)
- Mouth: Corhana River

Basin features
- Progression: Corhana→ Crișul Repede→ Körös→ Tisza→ Danube→ Black Sea
- Tributaries
  - left: Veljul Mic, Veljul Negreștilor

The Velju Mare (in its lower course also Valea Mare) is a left tributary of the river Corhana in Romania. Near Inand much of its flow is diverted by the Criș Collector Canal towards the Crișul Negru near Tămașda.
