= Mehedinți Plateau Geopark =

Romanian protected area

- Geoparcul Platoul Mehedinți
- IUCN category V (protected landscape/seascape)
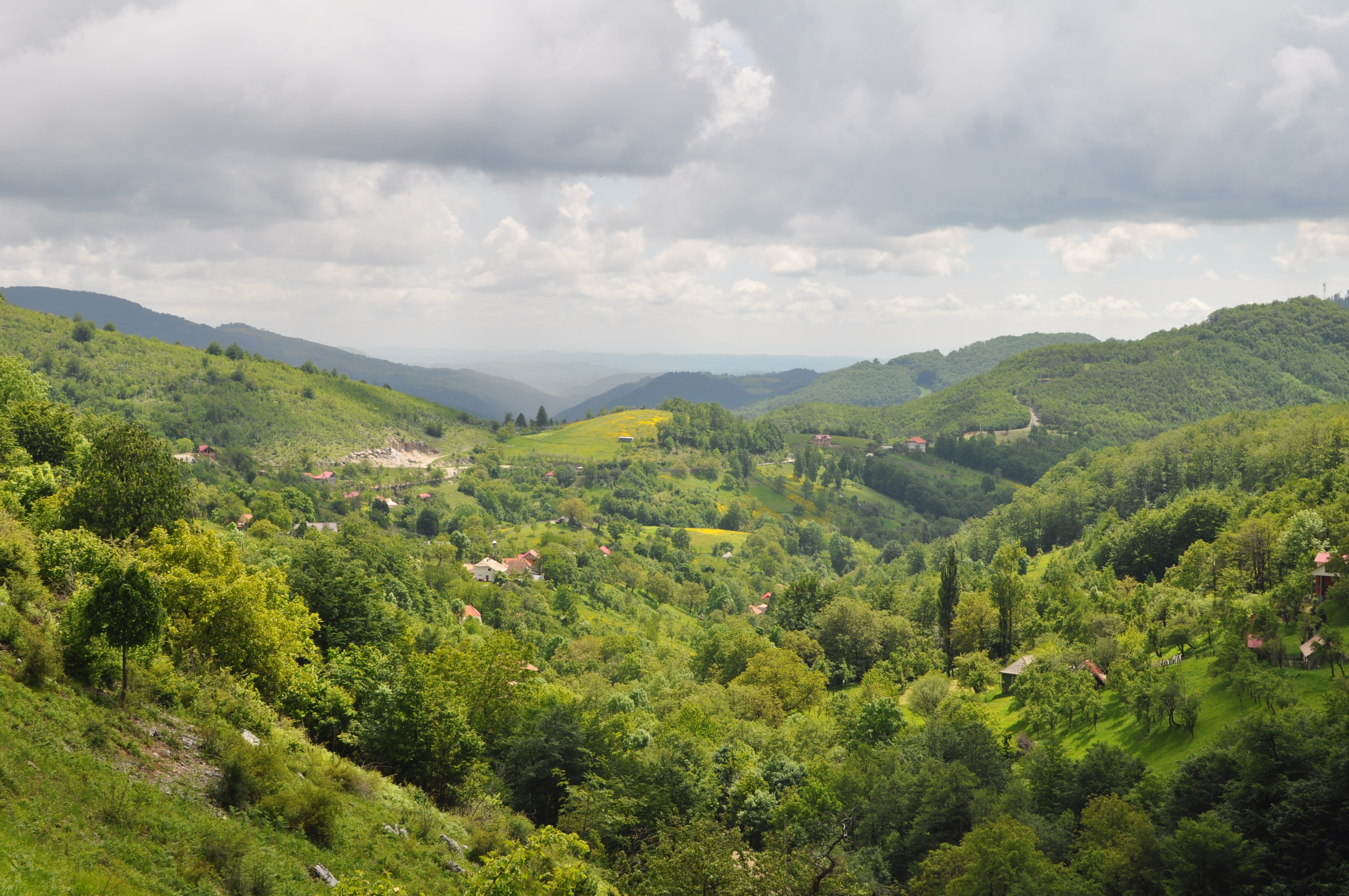
- Mehedinți Plateau

- Location within Romania
- Location: Romania; Gorj County; Mehedinți County
- Nearest city: Drobeta Turnu-Severin
- Coordinates: 44°52′14″N 22°41′21″E
- Area: 106.500 hectares (263.17 acres)
- Established: 2005

The Mehedinți Plateau Geopark (Romanian: Geoparcul Platoul Mehedinți) is a protected area (natural park category V IUCN) situated in Romania, on the administrative territory of counties Gorj (5%) and Mehedinți (95%).

== Description ==
The Mehedinți Plateau Geopark with an area of 106,500 ha was declared a natural protected area by the Government Decision Number 2152 on November 30, 2004 (published in Romanian Official Paper Number 38 on January 12, 2005) and represents a hill area (ravine, gentler valleys, limestone pavements, caves, pit caves, forests, pasture) that shelters a large variety of flora and fauna, some of the species very rarely or endemics.

Protected areas in the park include: Complexul carstic de la Ponoarele, Pădurea cu liliac Ponoarele, Cheile Coșutei, Cornetul Babelor și Cerboanei, Cornetul Bălții, Cornetul și Topolniței Cave, Cornetul Bălții, Izvorul și stâncăriile de la Câmana, Pereții calcaroși de la Izvoarele Cășutei and Epuran Cave.

== See also ==
- Protected areas of Romania
