= Iosif Matula =

Romanian engineer and politician

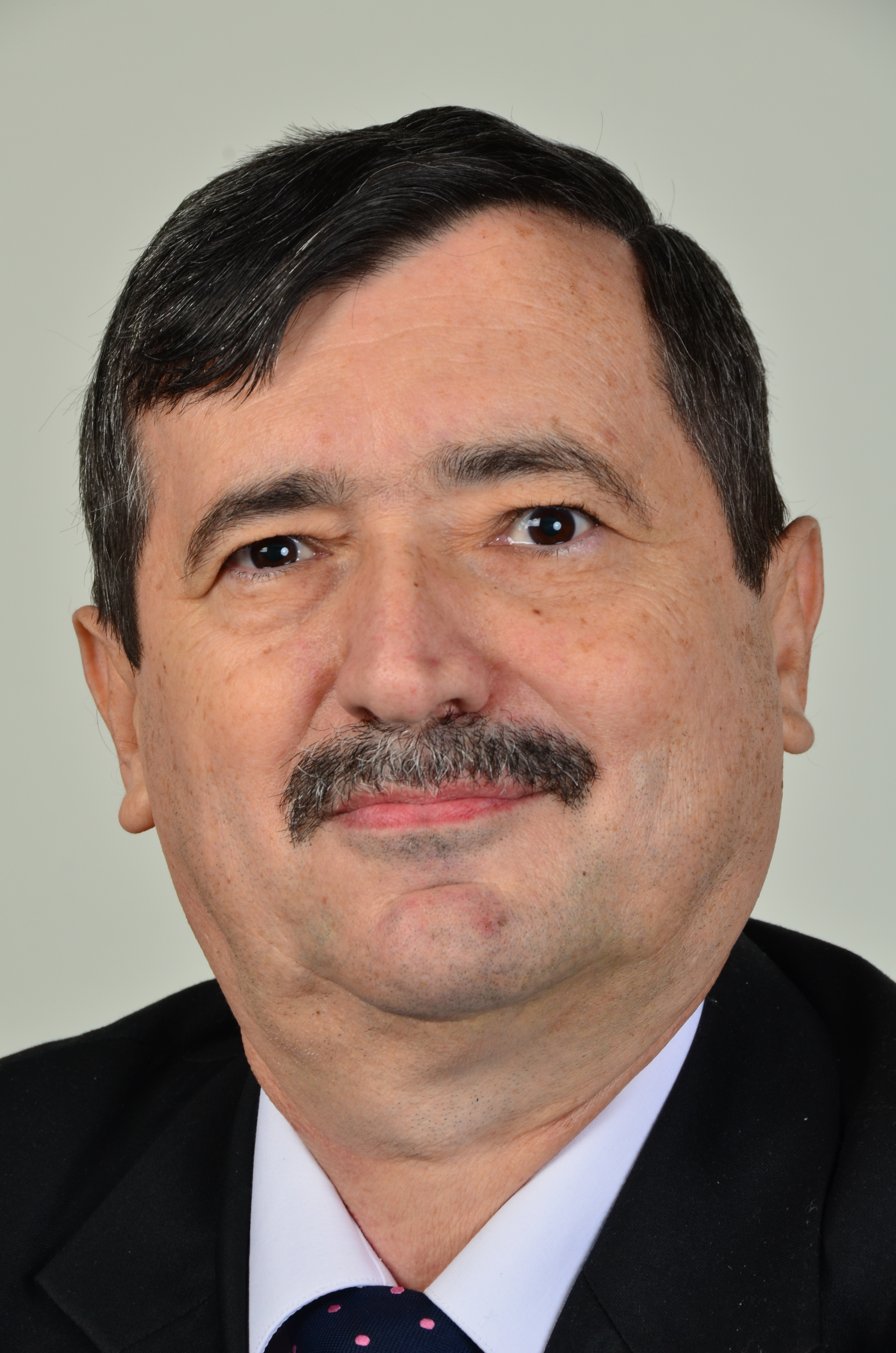
Matula in February 2014

Iosif Matula (born August 23, 1958) is a Romanian engineer and politician. A member of the Democratic Liberal Party (PDL), he was a Member of the European Parliament (MEP) from 2009 to 2014.

== Biography ==
He was born in Tămaşda, Bihor County, Romania and following secondary studies at the Theoretical High School in Chişineu-Criş from 1973 to 1977, from that year until 1980 he was a worker, receiver and distributor at the Dacia service station in Arad. From 1980 to 1985, he studied at the Chemical Technology Faculty of Babeş-Bolyai University in Cluj-Napoca, receiving the diploma of a chemical engineer. From 1985 to 1991 he worked as such at the Salonta division of an Oradea wood preparation company, in the laboratory and production sections. From 1991 to 2008, he was a teacher at the Chişineu-Criş Theoretical High School. Meanwhile, Matula continued his education, in particular studying Chemistry and Physics at Babeş-Bolyai from 1997 to 2001 and earning a license to teach those subjects; and earning a master's degree in Economics, with the specialty of management and finance in public administration, from the Aurel Vlaicu University of Arad in 2007.

Matula joined the Democratic Party (PD; evolved into PDL in 2007) in 1999, becoming vice president of its Arad County chapter in 2006. From 2000 to 2004, he was the deputy mayor of Chişineu-Criş. From 2005, following the departure of his predecessor Gheorghe Seculici, to 2008, he served as president of the Arad County Council, followed by a stint as its vice president from local elections in 2008 to 2009. He ran for the European Parliament in 2007, but at thirteenth position on the party list, did not win a seat. In January 2009, following the resignation of five Romanian MEPs to take other political offices, Matula was named to replace one of them. During the first months of that year, Elena Băsescu, daughter of President Traian Băsescu, served as an intern in his office. At the election that June, this time placed at sixth position, he won a full five-year term in the European Parliament, as did Elena Băsescu. In the parliament, he sat on the Committee on Regional Development.
