= Comana Natural Park =

Protected area in Romania

- Parcul Natural Comana
- IUCN category V (protected landscape/seascape)
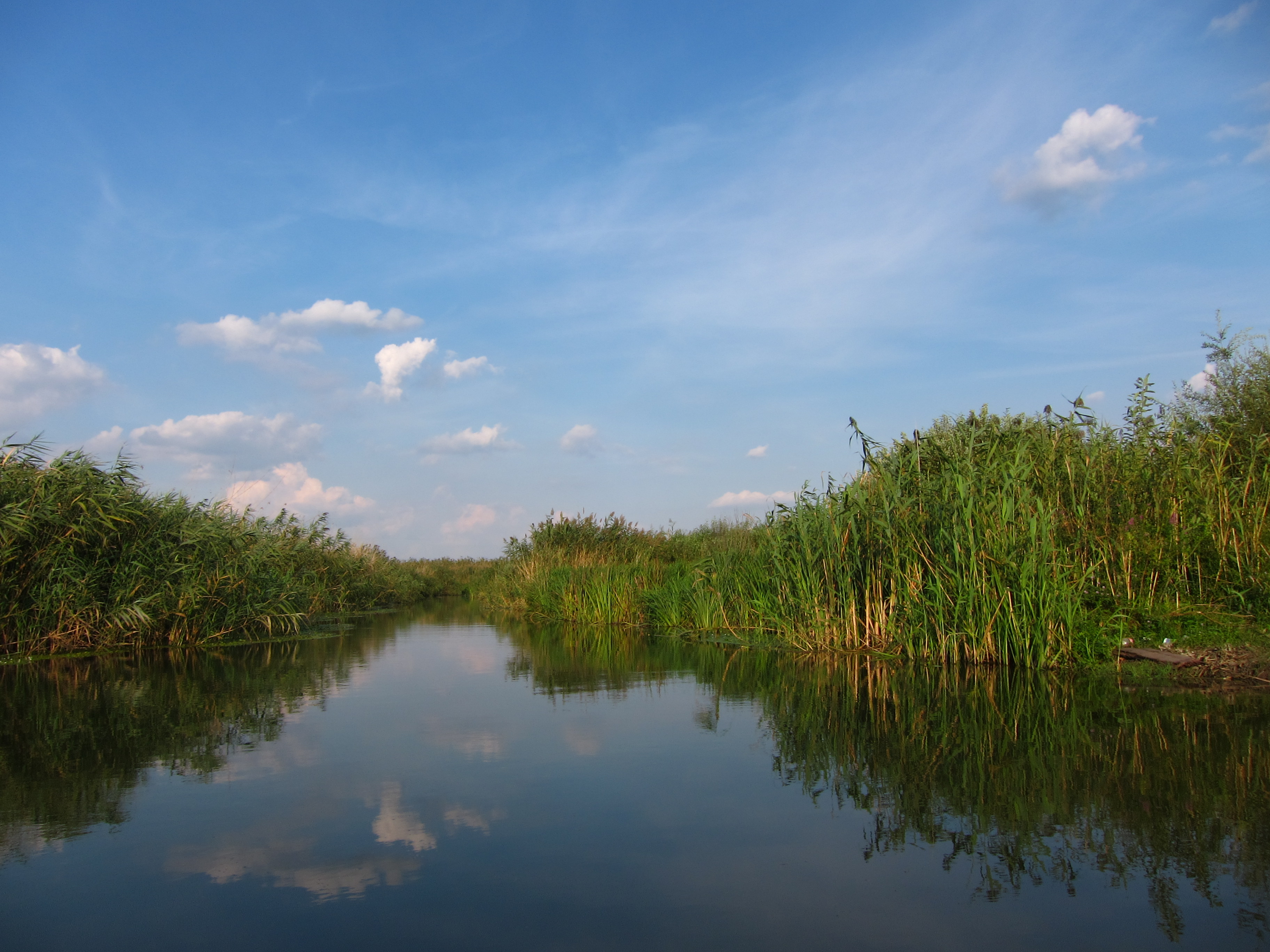
- Neajlov River in Comana Natural Park

- Location within Romania
- Location: Romania; Giurgiu County
- Nearest city: Giurgiu
- Coordinates: 44.140°N 26.112°E
- Area: 24,963 hectares (61,680 acres)
- Established: 2005
- Website: (in Romanian) comanaparc.ro

Ramsar Wetland
- Designated: 5 March 2009
- Reference no.: 2004

The Comana Natural Park (Romanian: Parcul Natural Comana) is a protected area (natural park category V IUCN) situated in Romania, in the administrative territory of Giurgiu County.

The park is roughly a 45-minute drive from the Romanian capital of Bucharest. The park was established in 2004 and has recreational activities such as kayaking,

== See also ==
- Protected areas of Romania
