= Șivița oil field =

Oil field in Romania

Șivița
- Country: Romania
- Region: Galați County
- Offshore/onshore: onshore
- Operator: Petrom

Field history
- Discovery: 1958
- Start of production: 1968

Production
- Current production of oil: 250 barrels per day (~12,000 t/a)
- Estimated oil in place: 2.7 million tonnes (~ 3×10^{6} m^{3} or 20 million bbl)

The Șivița oil field is an oil field located in Tulucești, Galați County. It was discovered in 1958 and developed by Petrom. It began production in 1968 and produces oil. The total proven reserves of the Șivița oil field are around 20 million barrels (2.7 million tonnes), and production is centered on 250 barrels per day (40 m^{3}/d).
