= Auguste Faguet =

French painter (1826–1900)

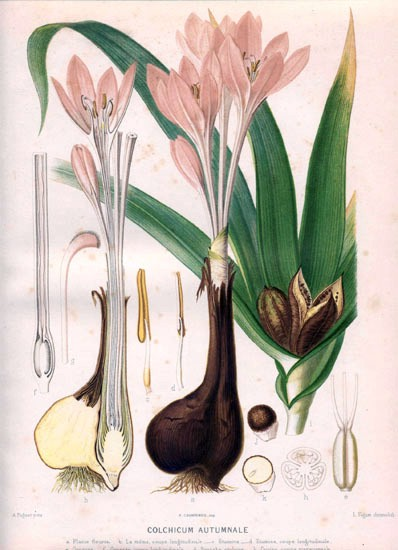
Colchicum autumnale L.

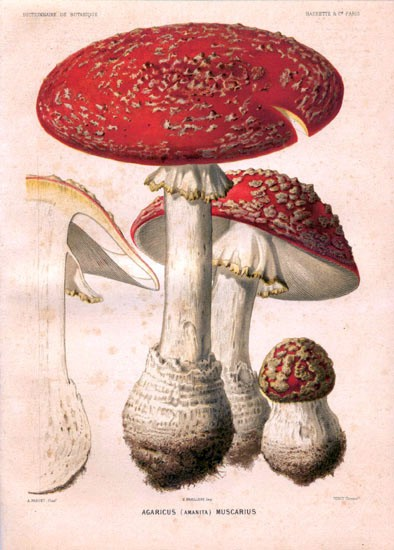
Amanita muscaria L.

Auguste Faguet (Tours, 8/11/1826 – Paris, 21/08/1900) was a 19th-century French botanical illustrator, well known for his contributions to major botanical works.

Auguste Faguet produced fine botanical wood engravings to illustrate the works of Henri Ernest Baillon. For the "Dictionnaire de botanique", which appeared in 34 fascicles between 1876 and 1892, he produced 32 chromolithographed plates, published with each fascicle.

Faguet's drawings involve accurate perspective, his skill creating persuasive depth. Faguet's other work for Baillon included "Recherches organogéniques sur la fleur femelle des conifères" of 1860, 1186 woodcuts in "Traité de botanique médicale phanérogamique" 1883–1884, 370 woodcuts in "Traité de botanique médicale cryptogamique" of 1889, "Loganiacées" of 1856 and "Bignoniacées" of 1864. Henri Faguet also did illustrations for Edouard Bureau's "Monographie des bignoniacées" of 1864, Alfred Grandidier's "Histoire physique, naturelle et politique de Madagascar" of 1875 and his "Histoire naturelle des plantes" that appeared between 1886 and 1903. Faguet also collaborated on a periodical, "L'Horticulteur Français", between 1851 and 1872. His excellent woodcuts were overtaken by the renewed use of metal printing plates for botanical illustrations. Thiebault and Faguet illustrated Henri Baillon's "Histoire des plantes" (1866-1895). Faguet supplied engraved text figures for Georges Octave Dujardin-Beaumetz (1833-1895) & Egasse's "Les plantes médicinales indigènes et exotiques" of 1889, and contributed to "The Floral Register", a periodical which appeared between 1825 and 1851.

== See also ==
- List of florilegia and botanical codices

== Bibliography ==
- Ibidispress
