= Henri Ernest Baillon =

French botanist and physician (1827–1895)

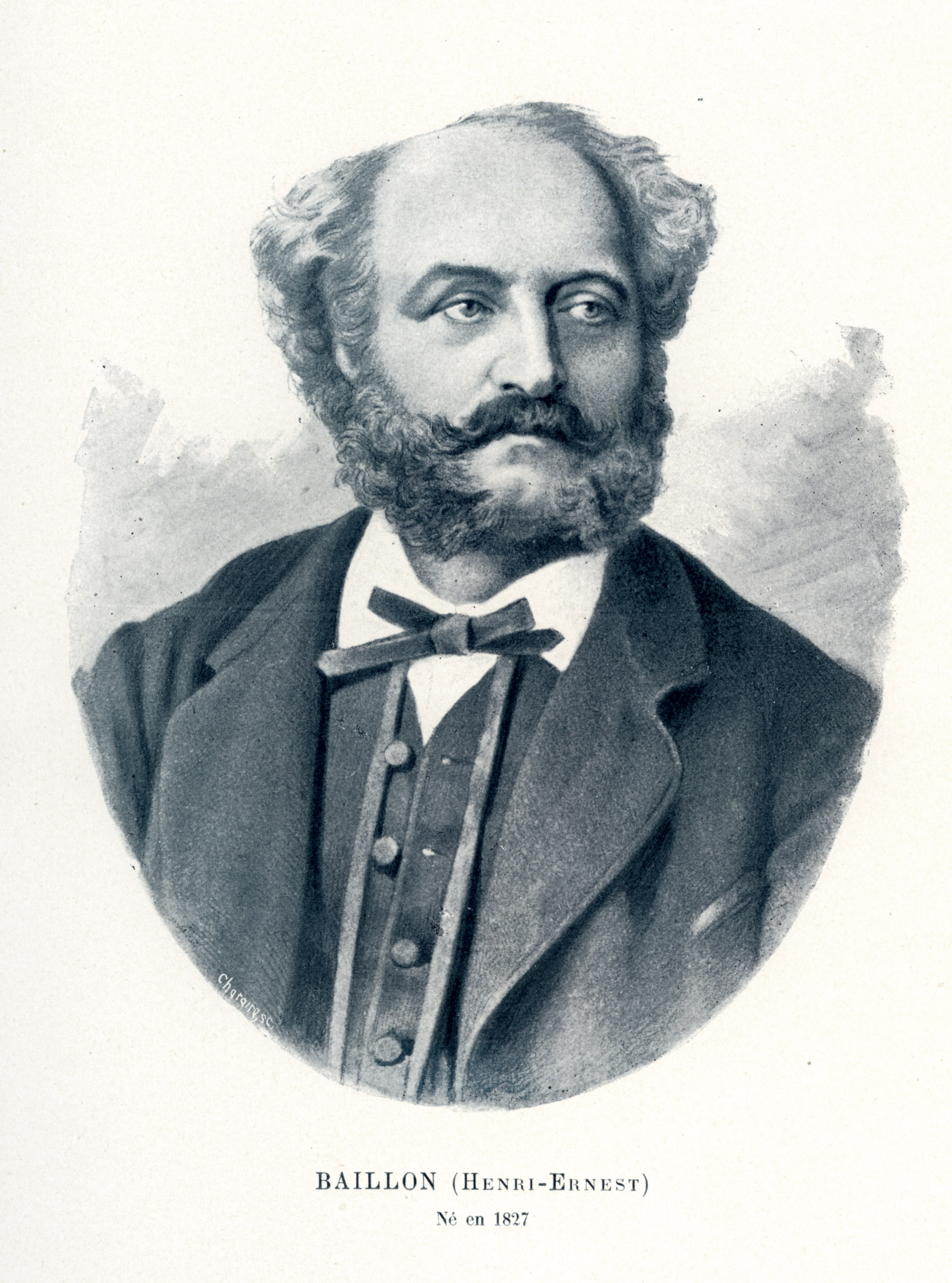
- Born: 30 November 1827; Calais, France
- Died: 19 July 1895 (aged 67); Paris, France
- Known for: Numerous botanical publications, Dictionnaire de botanique
- Awards: Légion d'honneur (1867), Fellow of the Royal Society (1894)
- Scientific career
- Fields: Botany, Medicine
- Thesis: Recherches sur l'organisation des Euphorbiacées (1858)
- Author abbrev. (botany): Baill.

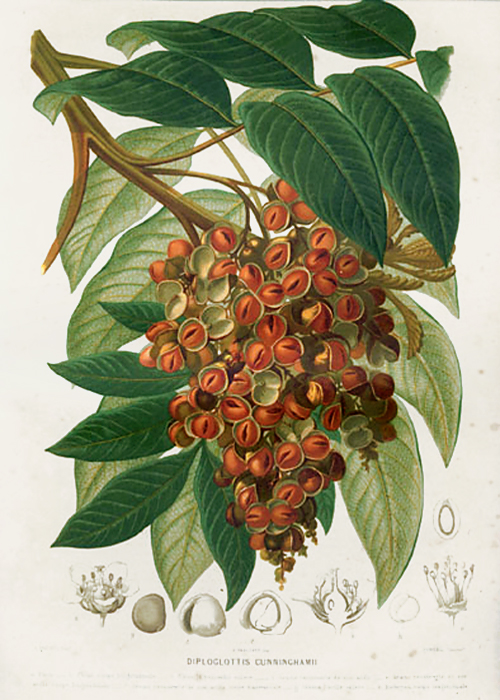
Diploglottis cunninghamii, Baillon's Dictionnaire de botanique

Henri Ernest Baillon (French pronunciation: [ɑ̃ʁi ɛʁnɛst bajɔ̃]; 30 November 1827 in Calais – 19 July 1895 in Paris) was a French botanist and physician who spent his academic career teaching natural history and publishing numerous works on botany. He was appointed to the Légion d'honneur in 1867, joined the Royal Society in 1894 and put together the Dictionnaire de botanique with Auguste Faguet's wood engravings. The standard author abbreviation Baill. is used to indicate this person as the author when citing a botanical name.

== Career ==
After obtaiing his doctorate in Medicine in Paris in 1855, he passed the agrégation in medicine in 1857. In 1858 he obtained a doctorate in natural sciences. He succeeded Moquin-Tandon as chair of medical natural history at the Paris School of Medicine in 1863. He later became professor of hygiene and natural history at the École Centrale Paris.

He was made a Knight of the Legion of Honour on 14 August 1867, and promoted to Officer on 13 July 1888.

Jacques Désiré Leandri (1903–1982)—who did not know him personally, having been born after Baillon's death—said of him: "He had a difficult and ironic character that made him enemies, and while his supporters at the Museum and the Institute were passionate and convinced, his enemies were no less so"; and François Gagnepain (1866–1952) said: "Very witty but a little sharp". Baillon did not mince his words in his criticism. For example, we read: "It seems that, with his usual inaccuracy in observing plant organization, he (Duchartre) mistook a large placenta laden with anatropous ovules for a single ovule"; and, less than 20 lines later: "I need not say that the one whose descriptions contain the most errors is, as always, Mr. Decaisne," followed by supporting evidence. This colors Decaisne's attitude (see the section below on "Learned societies"), but Baillon is essentially right: 150 years later, we are still surprised by the "relative theoretical mediocrity of Joseph Decaisne." Baillon did not reserve his sarcasm for his colleagues: the Revue encyclopédique of 1895 states that he had a reputation as a terrible examiner and was particularly feared by medical students. He took a group of students to Jean-Jacques Rousseau grave in Ermenonville for the centenary of the death of the "father of the Revolution" and gave a speech celebrating herbalism and botany, the science of observation taking precedence over the knowledge of words.

Henri Baillon is credited with writing a Dictionary of Botany and a voluminous History of Plants.

He died suddenly, struck down by "congestion" while bathing. His grave is in Montparnasse Cemetery (Paris), 8th division.

== Select works ==
- Étude générale du groupe des Euphorbiacées (1858)
- Monographie des Buxacées et des Stylocérée (1859)
- Recherches organogéniques sur la fleur femelle des Conifères (1860)
- Recherches sur l’organisation, le développement et l’anatomie des Caprifoliacées (1864)
- Adansonia, recueil périodique d’observations botaniques (12 volumes, 1866–1879)
- Histoire des plantes (thirteen volumes, 1867–1895)
- Dictionnaire de botanique (four volumes, 1876–1892)
- Histoire naturelle des plantes de Madagascar (three volumes)
- Traité de botanique médicale phanérogamique (1883-1884).
- Baillon, M. H. (1 November 1893). "L'organisation et les affinités des Campynémées". Bulletin mensuel de la Société linnéenne de Paris (in French). 2 (140): 1105–1109.
