= Sânnicolau Român =

- Commune
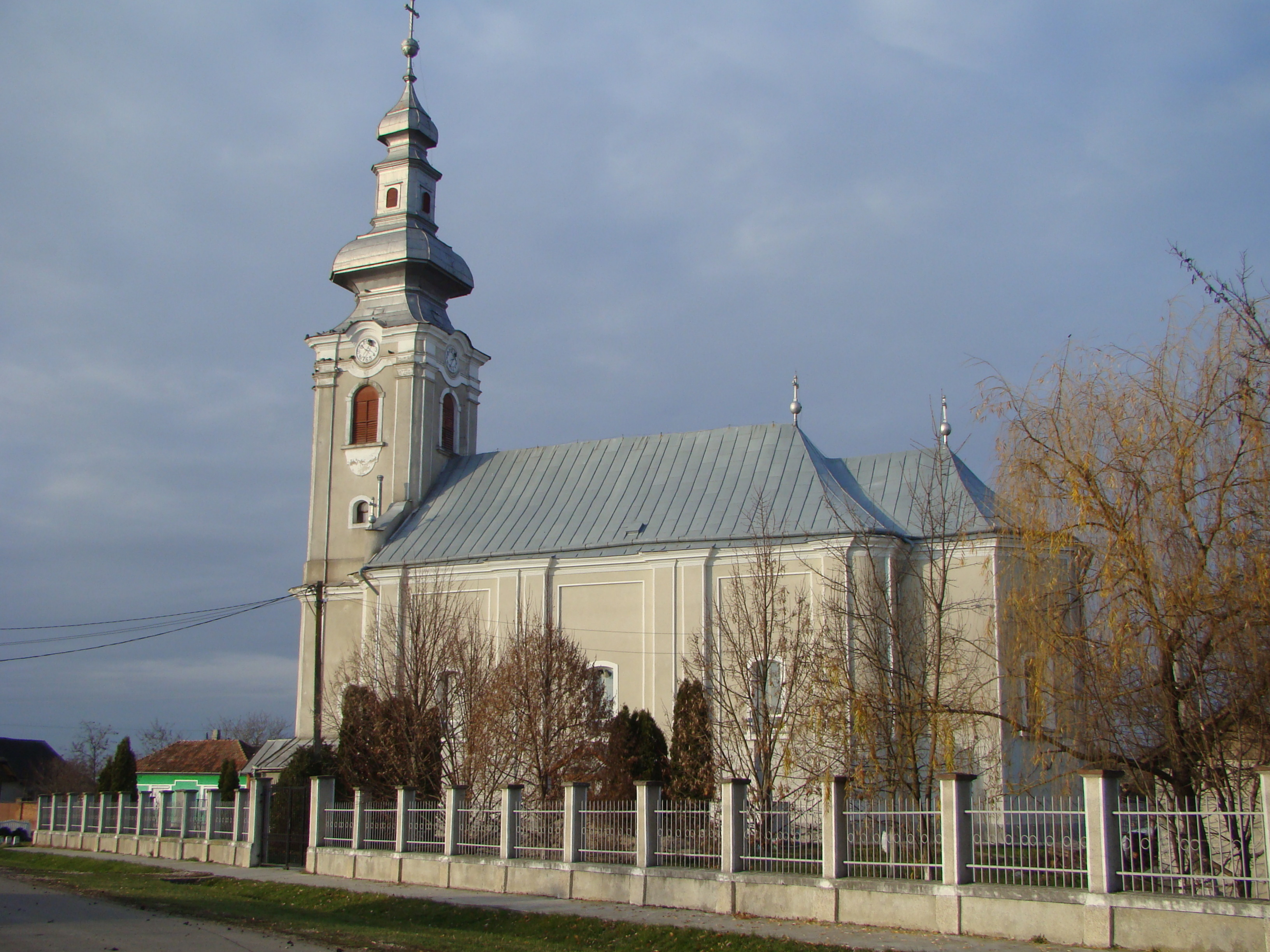
- Church in Sânnicolau Român

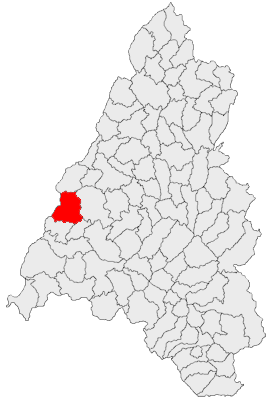
- Location in Bihor County

- Location in Romania
- Coordinates: 46°57′N 21°42′E
- Country: Romania
- County: Bihor

Government
  - Mayor (2020–2024): Dumitru-Marin Munge (PNL)
- Area: 75.09 km^{2} (28.99 sq mi)
- Population (2021-12-01): 2,650
  - Density: 35.3/km^{2} (91.4/sq mi)
- Time zone: UTC+02:00 (EET)
  - Summer (DST): UTC+03:00 (EEST)
- Postal code: 417153
- Area code: (+40) x59
- Vehicle reg.: BH
- Website: e.sinnicolauroman.ro

Sânnicolau Român (Hungarian: Oláhszentmiklós) is a commune located in Bihor County, Crișana, Romania. It is composed of three villages: Berechiu (Felsőbarakony), Roit (Rojt), and Sânnicolau Român. These were part of Cefa Commune until 2003, when they were split off.

The commune is located in the western part of Bihor County, 29 km (18 mi) from the county seat, Oradea, on the border with Hungary. It lies on the banks of the Criș Collector Canal.

== Natives ==
- Claudiu Petrila (born 2000), footballer
