= Cefa Natural Park =

Protected area in Romania

- Parcul Natural Cefa
- IUCN category V (protected landscape/seascape)
- Location within Romania
- Location: Romania; Bihor County
- Nearest city: Oradea
- Coordinates: 46.892°N 21.664°E
- Area: 50.02 km^{2} (19.31 sq mi)
- Established: 2010

The Cefa Natural Park (Romanian: Parcul Natural Cefa) is a protected area (natural park category V IUCN) situated in Romania, on the administrative territory of Bihor County.

== Location ==
The natural park is located on the west limit of the Bihor County with Hungary, on the Pannonian–Bulgarian migration corridor, one of the main bird migration corridors in Europe.

== Description ==
Cefa Natural Park with an area of 5,002 ha (12,360 acres) was declared a natural protected area by the Government Decision Number 1217 of December 02, 2010 (published in Romanian Official Paper Number 840 of December 15, 2010) and represents a large area with swamps, canals, floodplains, forest (Rădvani Forest), and pastures, and is a wetland of international importance, especially as habitat for waterfowls and terrestrial species.

== Fauna ==
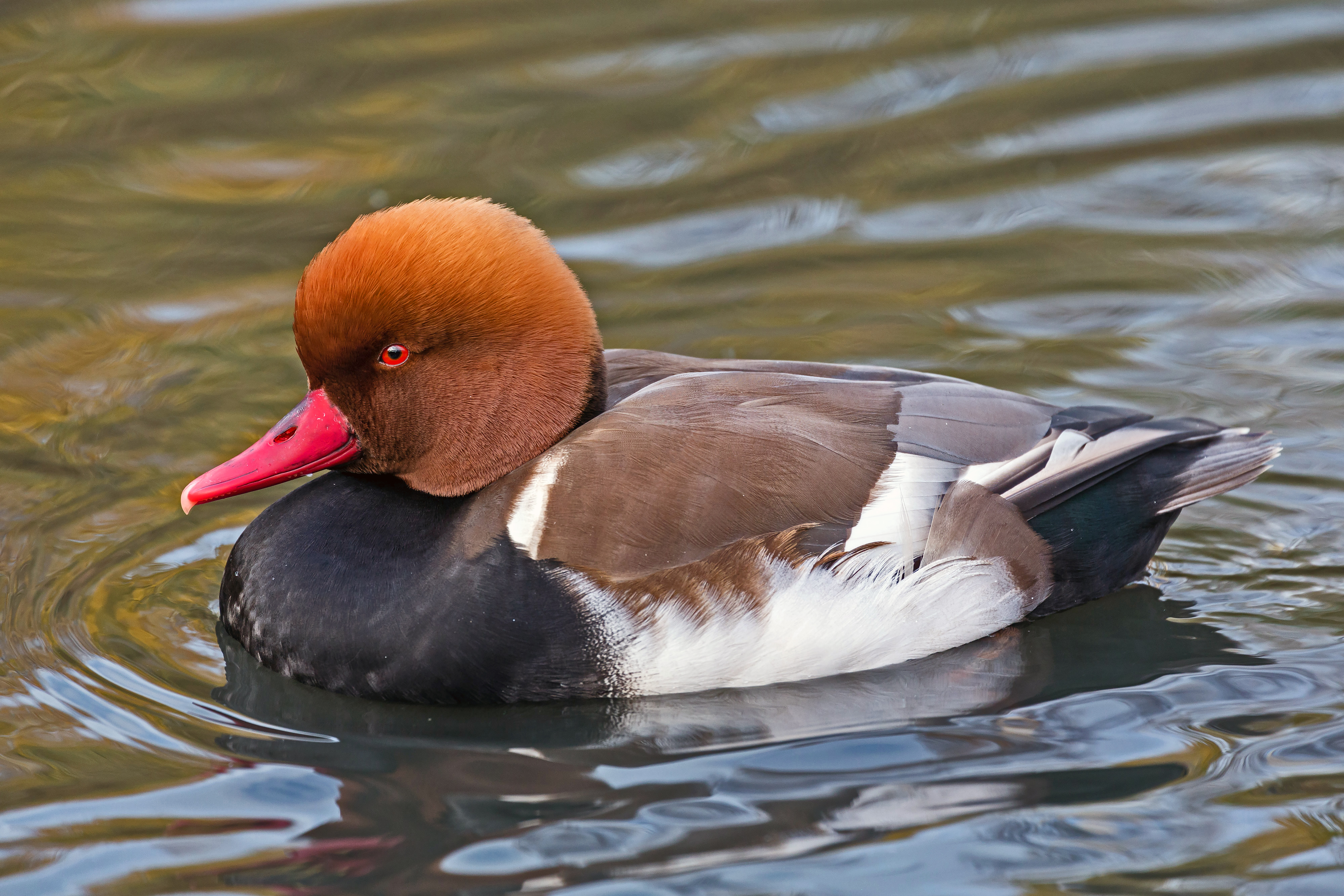
Netta rufina

Species of birds: grey heron (Ardea cinerea), little egret (Egretta garzetta), eastern imperial eagle (Aquila heliaca), squacco heron (Ardeola raloides), common pochard (Aythya ferina), Eurasian bittern (Botaurus stellaris), white stork (Ciconia ciconia), black stork (Ciconia nigra), pallid harrier (Circus macrourus), mute swan (Cygnus olor), Sanderling (Calidris alba), black-throated loon (Gavia arctica), common gull (Larus canus), red-crested pochard (Netta rufina), yellow wagtail (Motacilla flava), lesser black-backed gull (Larus fuscus), black-headed gull (Larus ridibundus), great grey shrike (Lanius excubitor) or Eurasian golden oriole (Oriolus oriolus).

== Access ==
- National road DN79 Timișoara - Arad - Inand - county road DJ797 - Cefa

== Gallery ==
Species of fauna

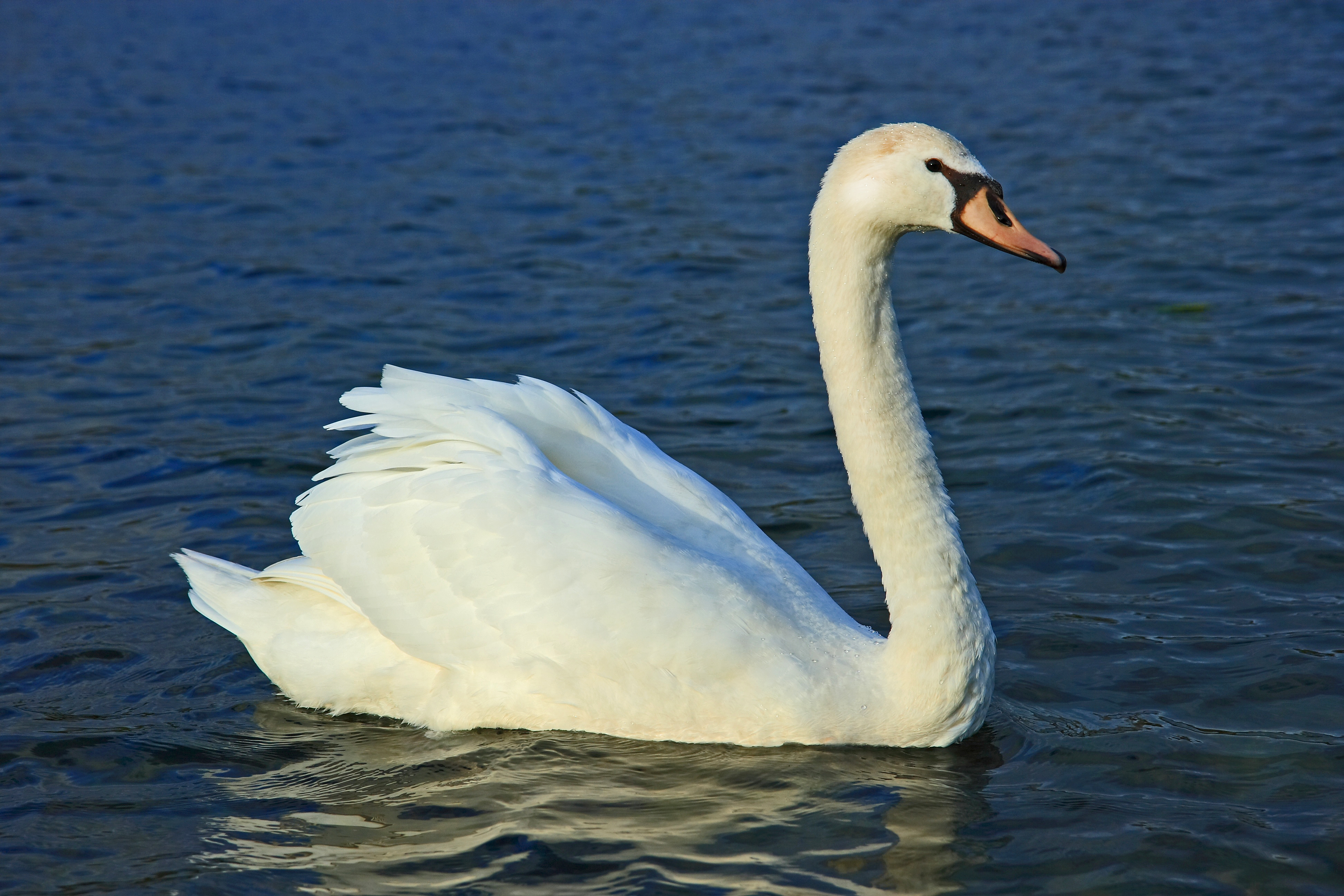
Mute swan

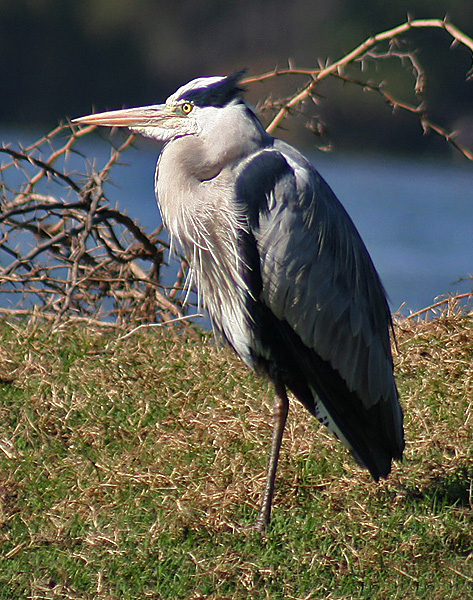
Grey heron
