= Geszt =

Coordinates: 46°53′N 21°35′E

- Interactive map of Geszt
- Country: Hungary
- County: Békés

Area
  - Total: 51.42 km^{2} (19.85 sq mi)

Population (2015)
  - Total: 821
  - Density: 16/km^{2} (41/sq mi)
- Time zone: UTC+1 (CET)
  - Summer (DST): UTC+2 (CEST)
- Postal code: 5734
- Area code: 68

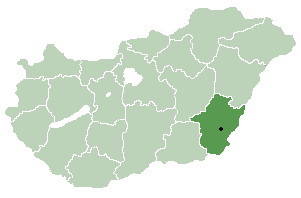
Location of Békés County in Hungary

Geszt is a village in Békés County, in the Southern Great Plain region of south-east Hungary.

The name of the village appeared first in a written document in 1213.

Kálmán Tisza, the Prime Minister of Hungary between 1875 and 1890, was born here.

== Geography ==
It covers an area of 51.42 km^{2} and has a population of 821 people (2015).
