= Lunca Joasă a Prutului Inferior Natural Park =

- Parcul Natural Lunca Joasă a Prutului Inferior
- IUCN category V (protected landscape/seascape)
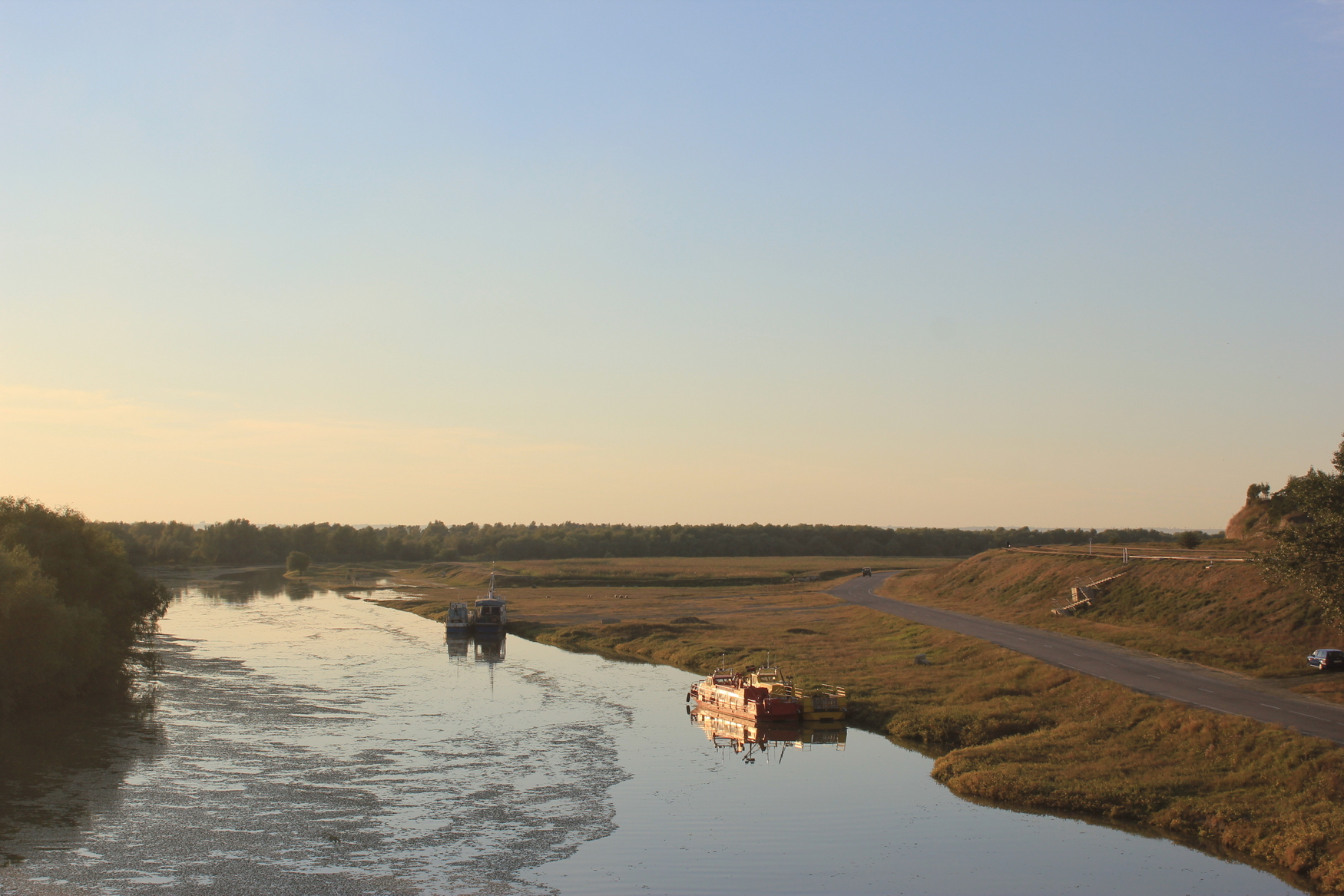
- Prut River near Giurgiulești, on the Romanian-Moldovan border

- Location within Romania
- Location: Romania; Galați County
- Nearest city: Tecuci
- Coordinates: 46°05′17″N 28°05′35″E
- Area: 8,247 ha (20,380 acres)
- Established: 2005

The Lunca Joasă a Prutului Inferior Natural Park (Romanian: Parcul Natural Lunca Joasă a Prutului Inferior) is a protected area (natural park category V IUCN) situated in Romania, in Galați County.

== Location ==
The Natural Park is situated in the inferior course of the Prut River, in the administrative territory of Berești-Meria, Nicorești, Cavadinești, Oancea, Suceveni, Vlădești, Tulucești, and Vânători communes, in the north-eastern part of Galați county.

== Description ==
The Lunca Joasă a Prutului Inferior with an area of 8,247 ha (20,380 acres) was declared natural protected area by the Government Decision Number 2152 on November 30, 2004 (published in Monitorul Oficial Number 38 on January 12, 2005) and represents a wetland (with canals, lakes, swamps, floodplains) of international importance especially for waterfowl habitat, or mammals, fish, and plant species

Protected areas included in the park include Ostrovul Prut, Pochina Lake and Vlășcuța Lake.
