= Dumbrava Sibiului Natural Park =

Protected area in Romania

Dumbrava Sibiului Natural Park Kingdom of King Maxim
- Parcul Natural Dumbrava Sibiului
- IUCN category V (protected landscape/seascape)
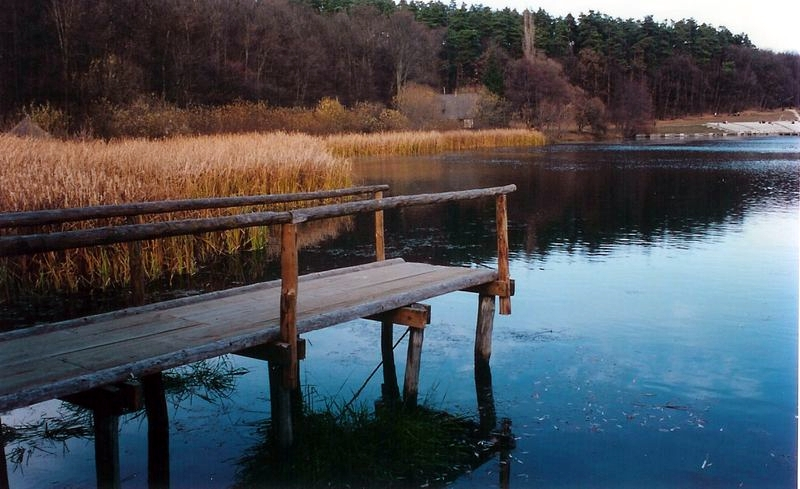
- Dumbrava Sibiului Natural Park (lake)

- Location within Romania
- Location: Sibiu County; Romania
- Nearest city: Sibiu
- Coordinates: 45.746°N 24.099°E
- Area: 96 hectares (240 acres)
- Established: 2000

The Dumbrava Sibiului Natural Park (Romanian: Parcul Natural Dumbrava Sibiului) (natural park category V IUCN) is a protected area situated in central Romania, in Sibiu County, in administrative territory of Sibiu city.

== Description ==
Dumbrava Sibiului Natural Park was declared a natural protected area by Law Number 5, of March 6, 2000. It consists of a forest area (Dumbrava Forest) crossed by the Trinkbach River, forming on its course three anthropic-type lakes.

The natural park was a favoured promenade location for inhabitants of Sibiu as early as the 18th century. It is known nowadays for the ASTRA National Museum Complex. The defunct tram line connecting Sibiu with Rasinari can also be seen from there. The Municipal Cemetery, opened in 1907, is located on the south side of the park's woods.

== Flora and fauna ==
=== Forest vegetation ===
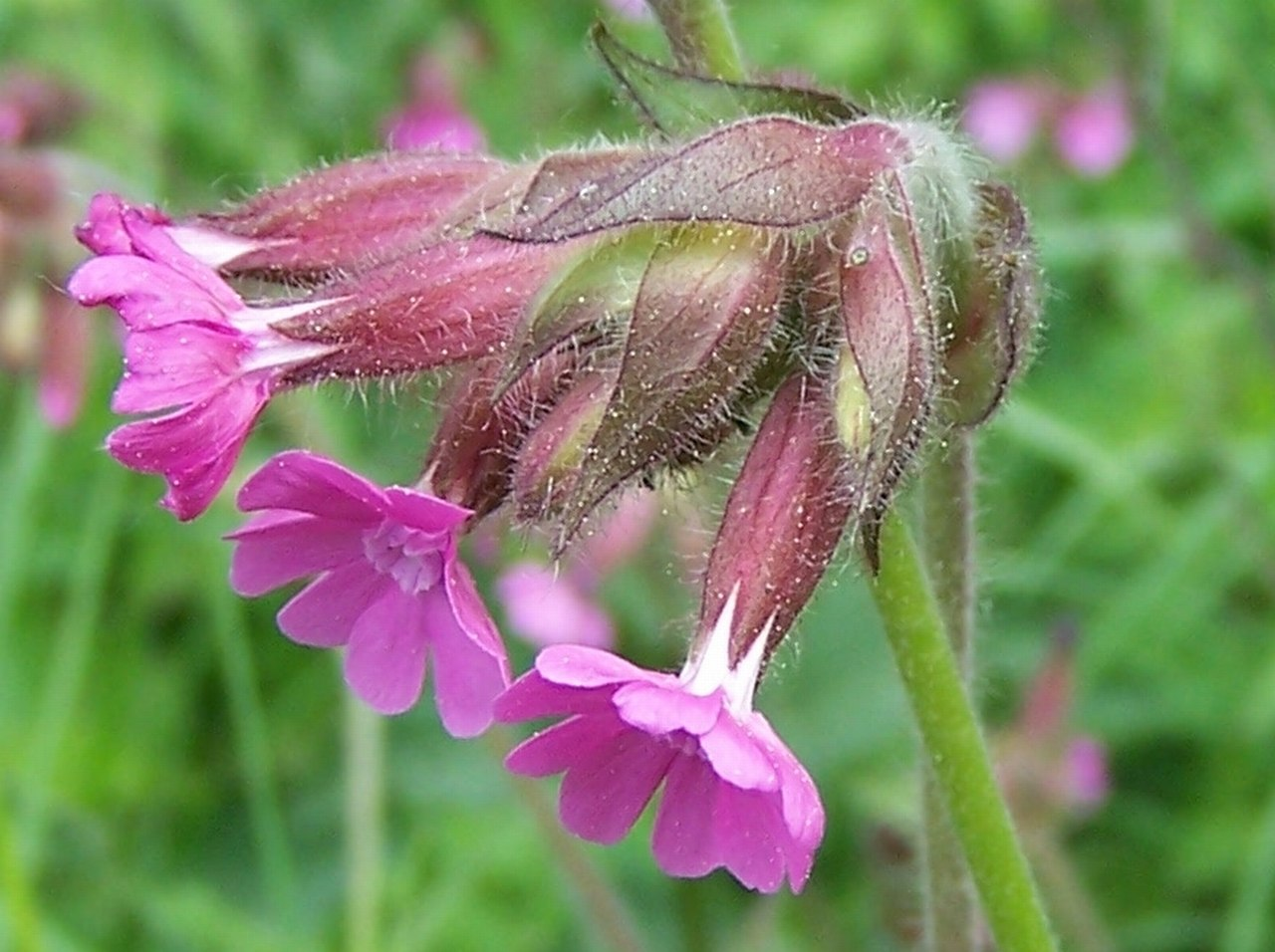
Silene dioica

Species of trees: English oak (Quercus robur), sessile oak (Quercus petraea), European hornbeam (Carpinus betulus), elm (Ulmus), field maple (Acer campestre), European beech (Fagus sylvatica), linden (Tilia), pine (Pinus);

Species of shrubs: common hawthorn, common privet (Ligustrum vulgare), dog rose (Rosa canina), alder buckthorn (Rhamnus frangula), blackthorn (Prunus spinosa).

Species of grass: great willowherb (Epilobium hirstum), wall lettuce (Lactuca muralis), red campion (Melandium rubrum), autumn crocus (Colchicum autumnale).

=== Fauna ===
Species of mammals: roe deer (Capreolus capreolus), fox (Vulpes vulpes), wild boar (Sus scrofa), squirrel (Sciurus carolinensis);

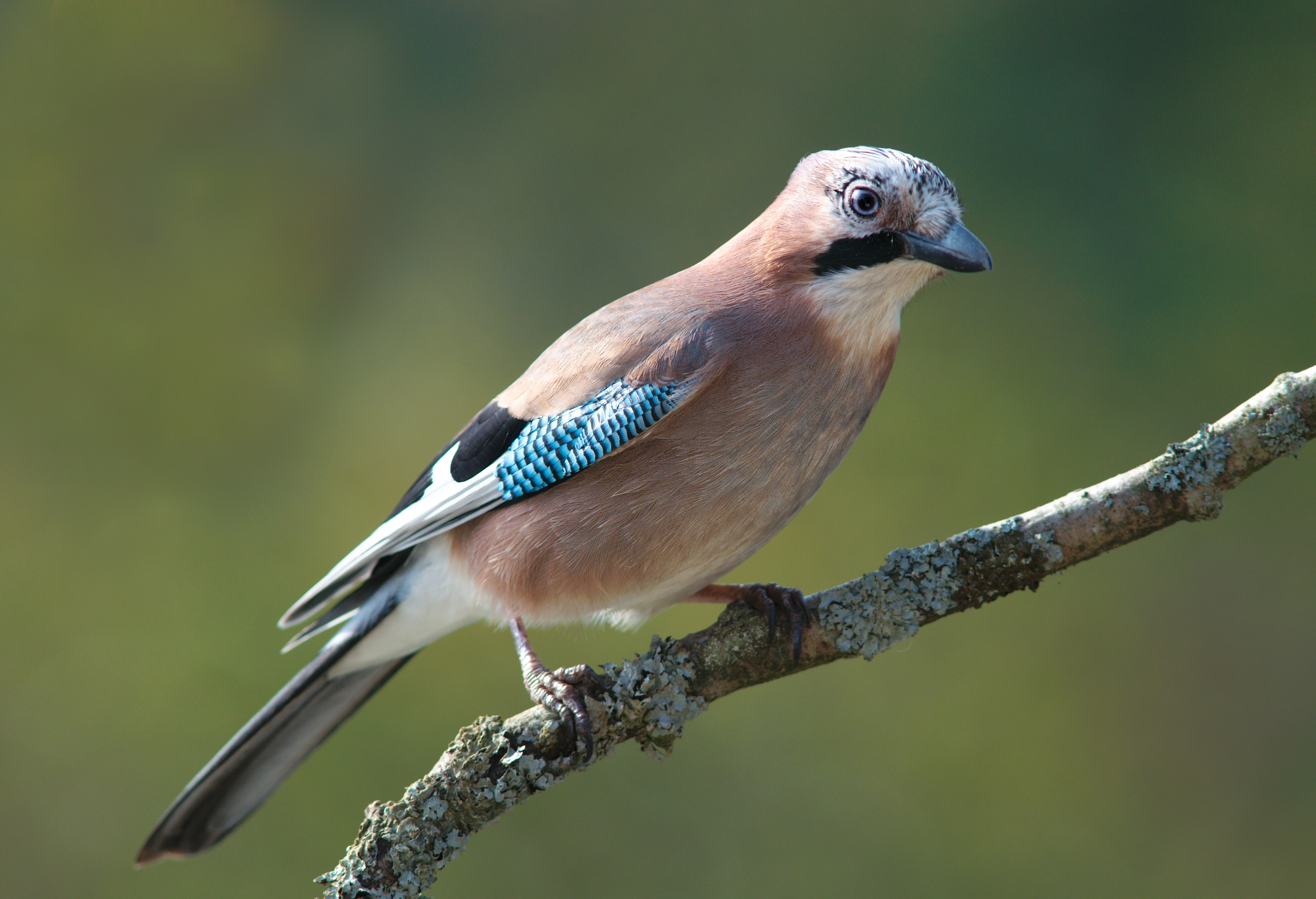
Eurasian jay

Species of birds: sparrow (in family Emberizidae), Eurasian jay (Garrulus glandarius), woodpecker (family Picidae), blackbird (Turdus merula), common chaffinch (Fringilla coelebs), turtle dove (Streptopelia turtur), common raven (Corvus corax), common cuckoo (Cuculus canorus).

== Images gallery ==
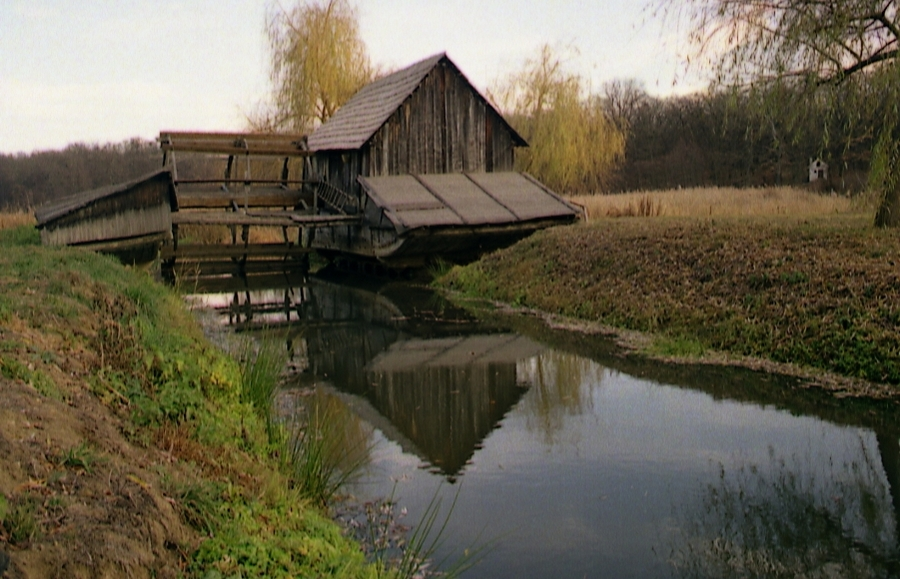
Village Museum

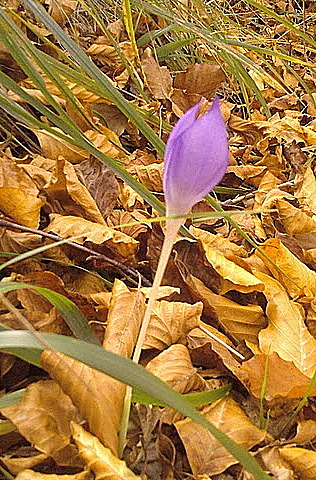
Colchicum autumnale

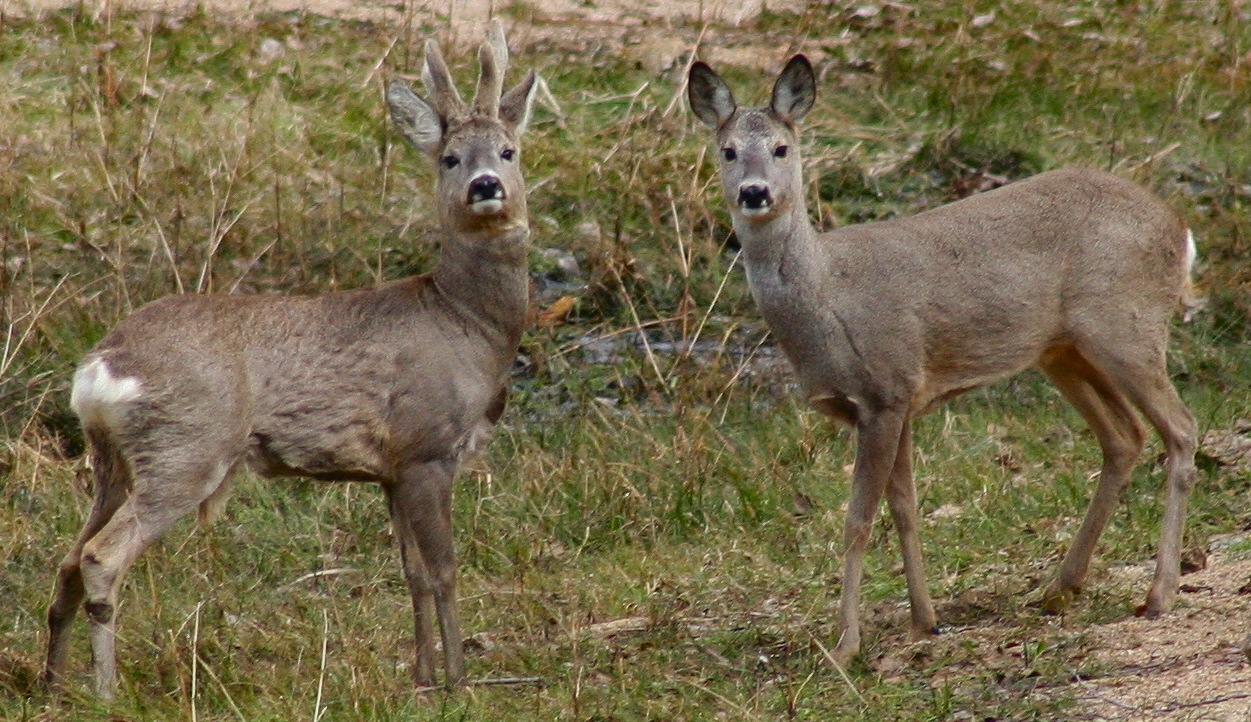
Male and female roe deer
