= Girișu de Criș =

Girișu de Criș Körösgyéres
- Commune
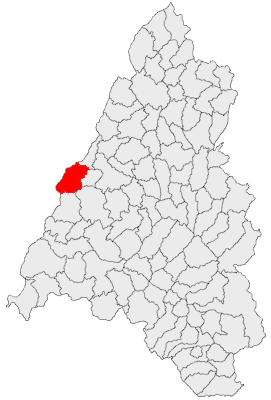
- Location in Bihor County

- Location in Romania
- Coordinates: 47°4′N 21°47′E
- Country: Romania
- County: Bihor
- Population (2021-12-01): 3,772
- Time zone: EET/EEST (UTC+2/+3)
- Vehicle reg.: BH

Girișu de Criș (Hungarian: Körösgyéres) is a commune in Bihor County, Crișana, Romania, with a population of 3,588 people. It is composed of two villages, Girișu de Criș and Tărian (Köröstarján).
