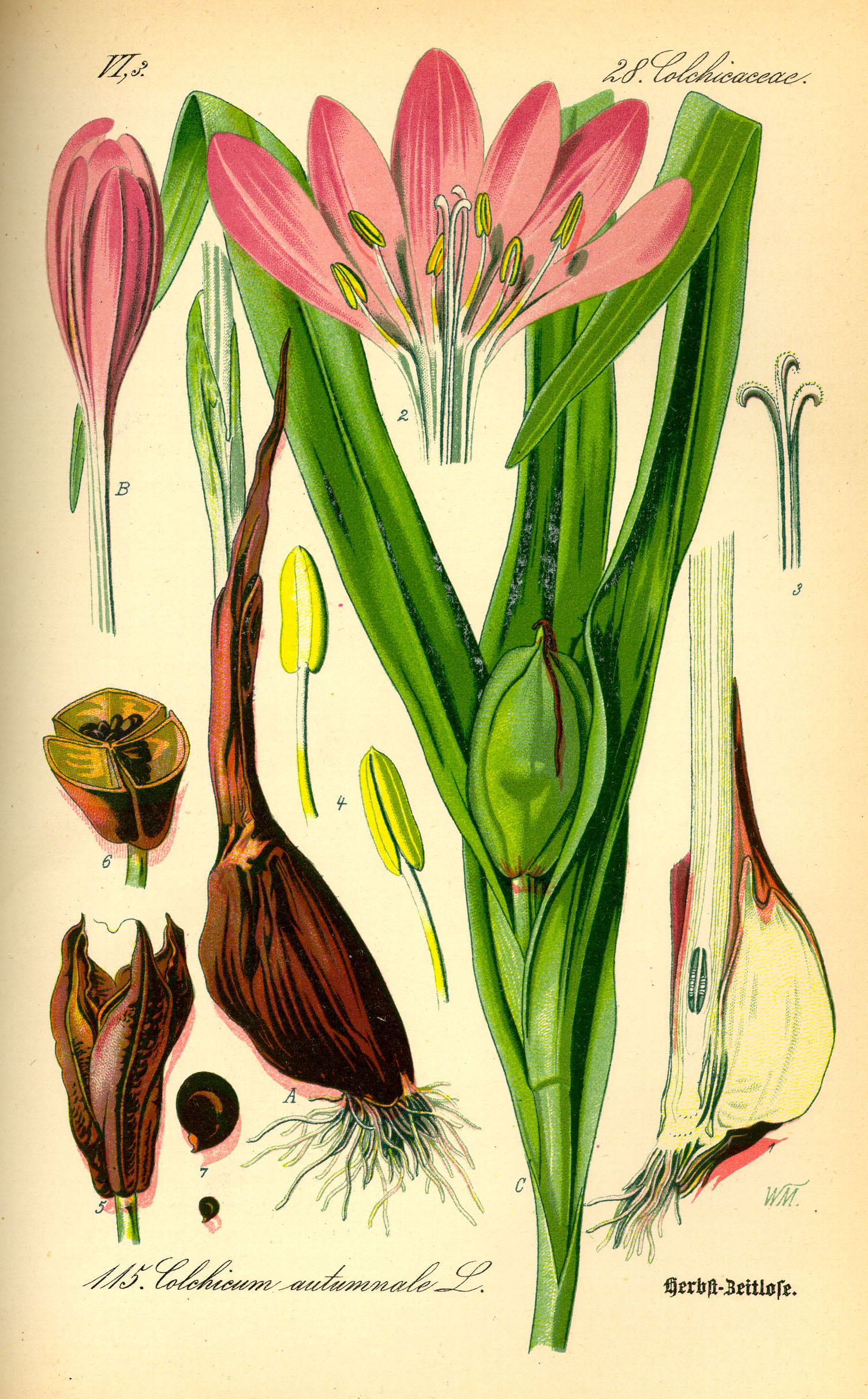

Scientific classification
- Kingdom: Plantae
- Clade: Tracheophytes
- Clade: Angiosperms
- Clade: Monocots
- Order: Liliales
- Family: Colchicaceae
- Genus: Colchicum
- Species: C. autumnale

Binomial name
- Colchicum autumnale L.

Synonyms
- Synonyms list: Colchicum commune Neck.; Bulbocodium antumnale (L.) Lapeyr.; Colchicum vernale Hoffm.; Colchicum vernum (Reichard) Georgi; Colchicum polyanthon Ker Gawl.; Colchicum praecox Spenn.; Colchicum crociflorum Sims; Colchicum orientale Friv. ex Kunth; Colchicum autumnale var. viridiflorum Opiz; Colchicum pannonicum Griseb. & Schenk; Colchicum transsilvanicum Schur; Colchicum turcicum subsp. pannonicum (Griseb. & Schenk) Nyman; Colchicum bulgaricum Velen.; Colchicum borisii Stef.; Colchicum vranjanum Adamovic ex Stef.; Colchicum doerfleri var. orientale Kitanov; Colchicum drenowskii Degen & Rech.f. ex Kitan.; Colchicum rhodopaeum Kov.

= Colchicum autumnale =

Species of flowering plant

Colchicum autumnale, commonly known as autumn crocus, meadow saffron, naked boys or naked ladies, is a toxic autumn-blooming flowering plant that resembles the true crocuses, but is a member of the plant family Colchicaceae, unlike the true crocuses, which belong to the family Iridaceae. It is called "naked boys/ladies" because the flowers emerge from the ground long before the leaves appear. Despite the vernacular name of "meadow saffron", this plant is not the source of saffron, which is obtained from the saffron crocus, Crocus sativus – and that plant, too, is sometimes called "autumn crocus".

The species is cultivated as an ornamental in temperate areas, in spite of its toxicity. The cultivar 'Nancy Lindsay' has gained the Royal Horticultural Society's Award of Garden Merit.

== Description ==
This herbaceous perennial has leaves up to 25 cm (10 in) long. The flowers are solitary, 4–7 cm (2–3 in) across, with six tepals and six stamens with orange anthers and three white styles. At the time of fertilisation, the ovary is below ground.

== Distribution and habitat ==
C. autumnale is the only species of its family native to Great Britain and Ireland, with notable populations under the stewardship of the County Wildlife Trusts. It also occurs across mainland Europe from Portugal to Ukraine, and is reportedly naturalised in Sweden, European Russia, and New Zealand. It grows in lowland grassy meadows.

== Pharmaceutical uses ==
The bulb-like corms of C. autumnale contain colchicine, a useful drug with a narrow therapeutic index. Colchicine is approved in many countries for the treatment of gout and familial Mediterranean fever. Colchicine is also used in plant breeding to produce polyploid strains.

== Toxicity ==
Colchicum is lethally toxic due to its colchicine content. Its leaves have been mistaken by foragers for those of Allium ursinum (ramsons or wild garlic), which they vaguely resemble.

This plant (and colchicine itself) poses a particular threat to felines. The corms of meadow saffron contain the highest level of toxins, but all parts of the plant are regarded as poisonous.

== Gallery ==
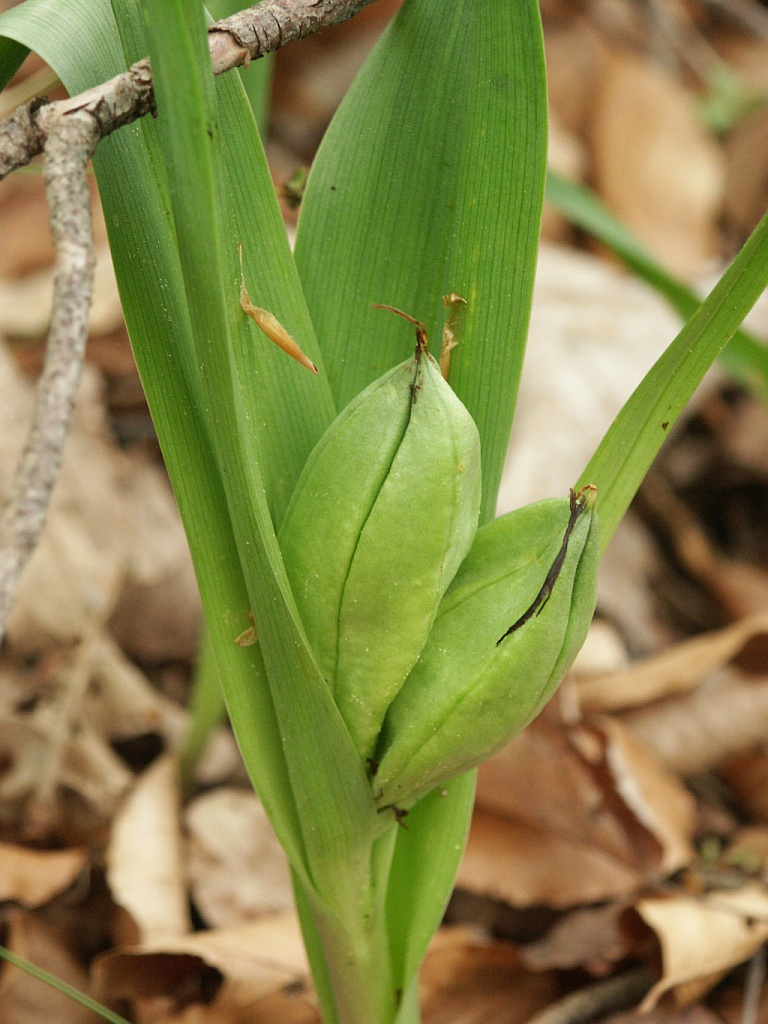
Seed capsules

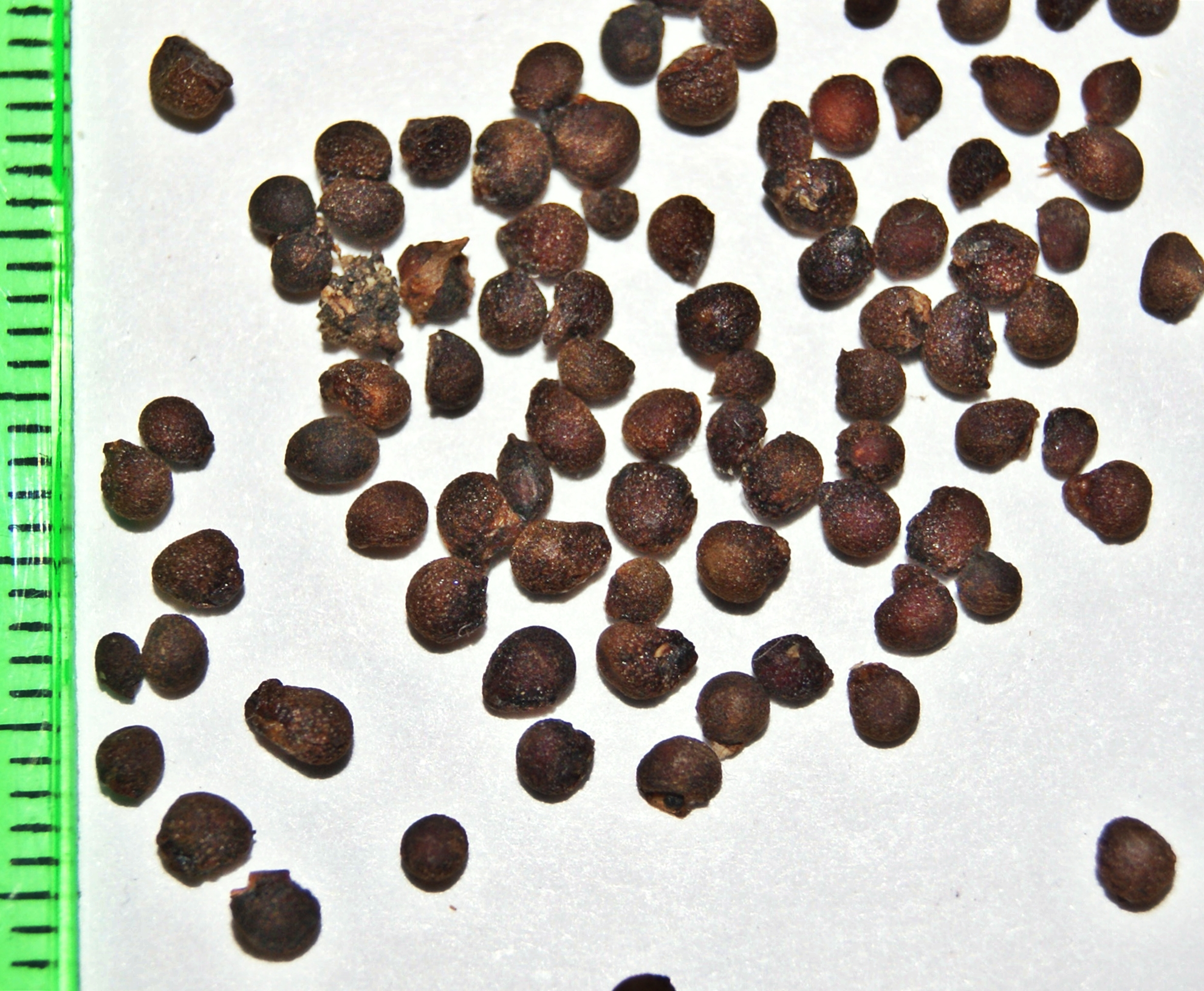
Seeds

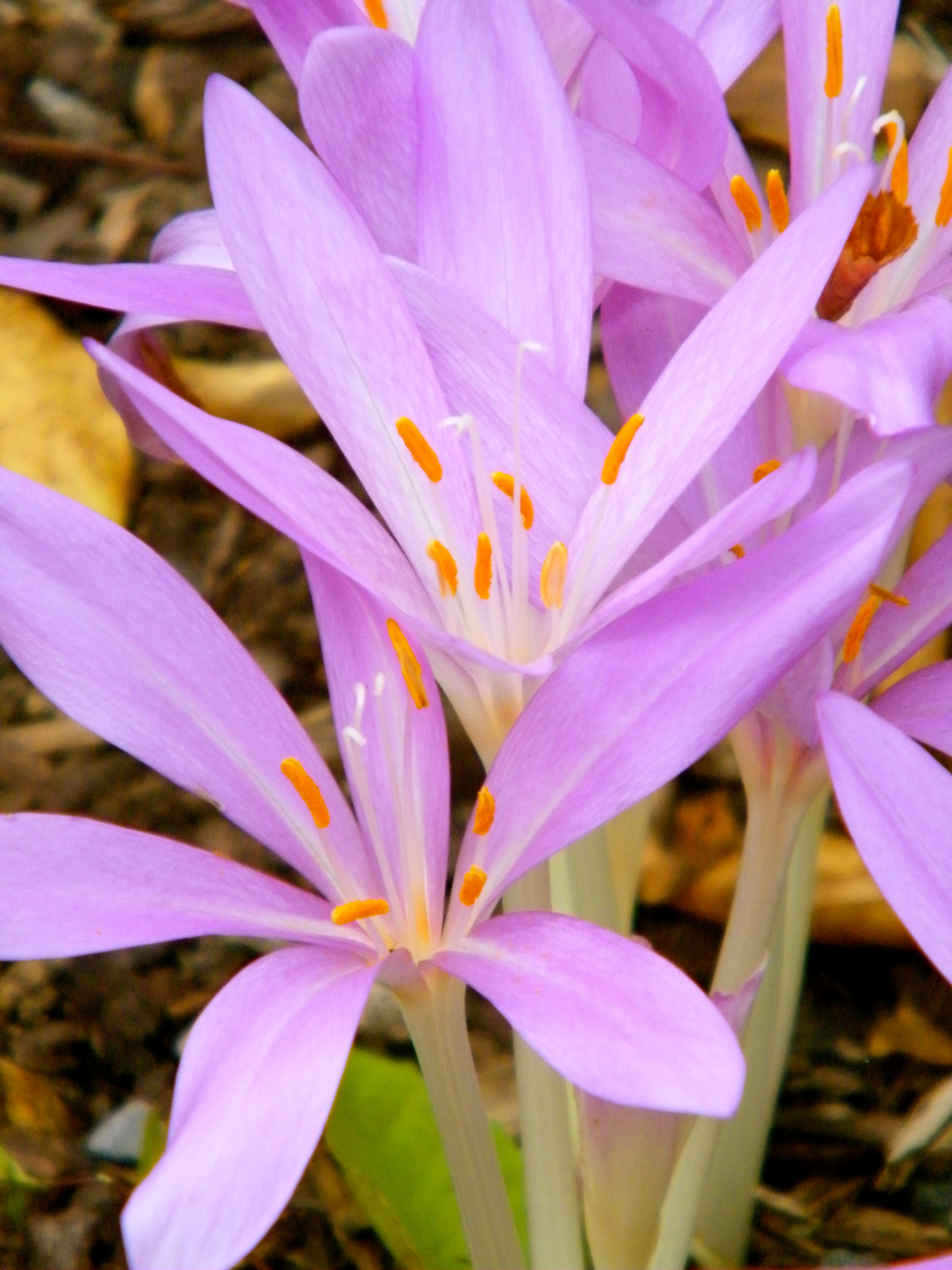
Detail of flower at the United States Botanic Gardens

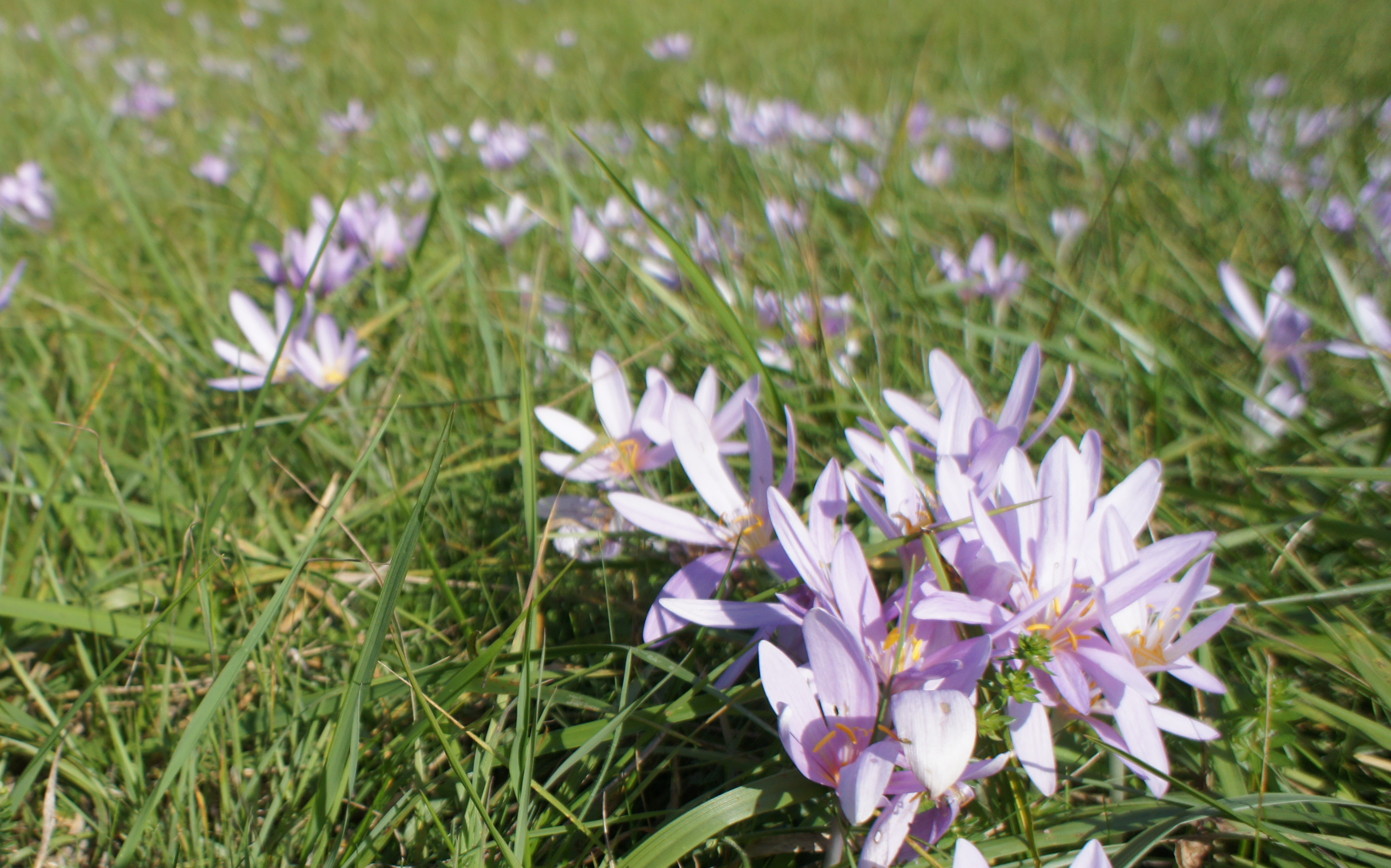
In a meadow Lauterbourg, (Alsace), France

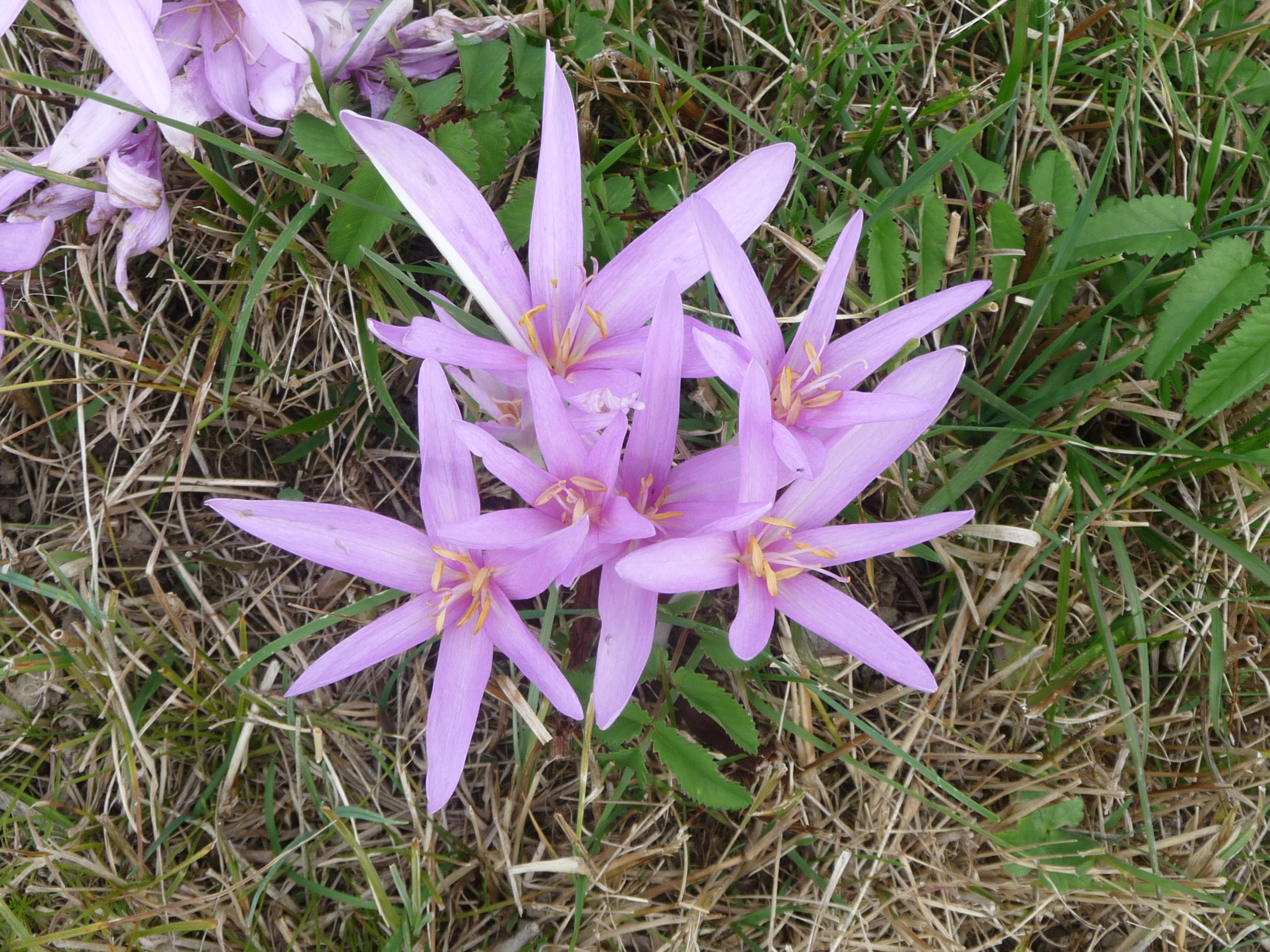
Group of autumn crocus on an alpine meadow (Laterns, Vorarlberg, Austria)

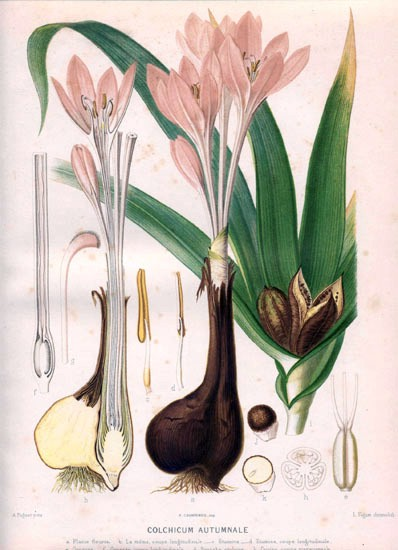
Colchicum autumnale by Auguste Faguet

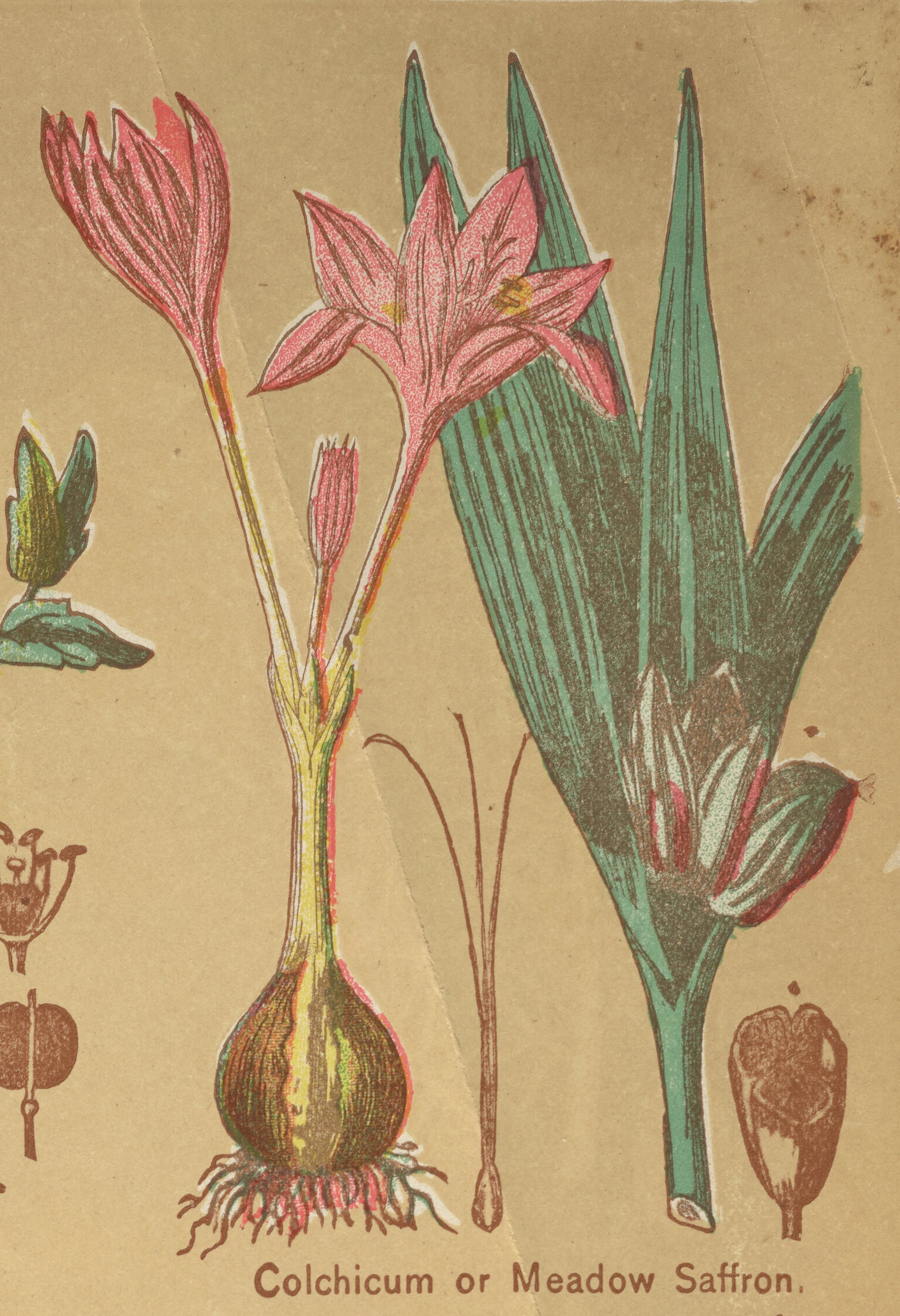
From The Book of Health, 1898, by Henry Munson Lyman
