= Tulucești =

- Commune
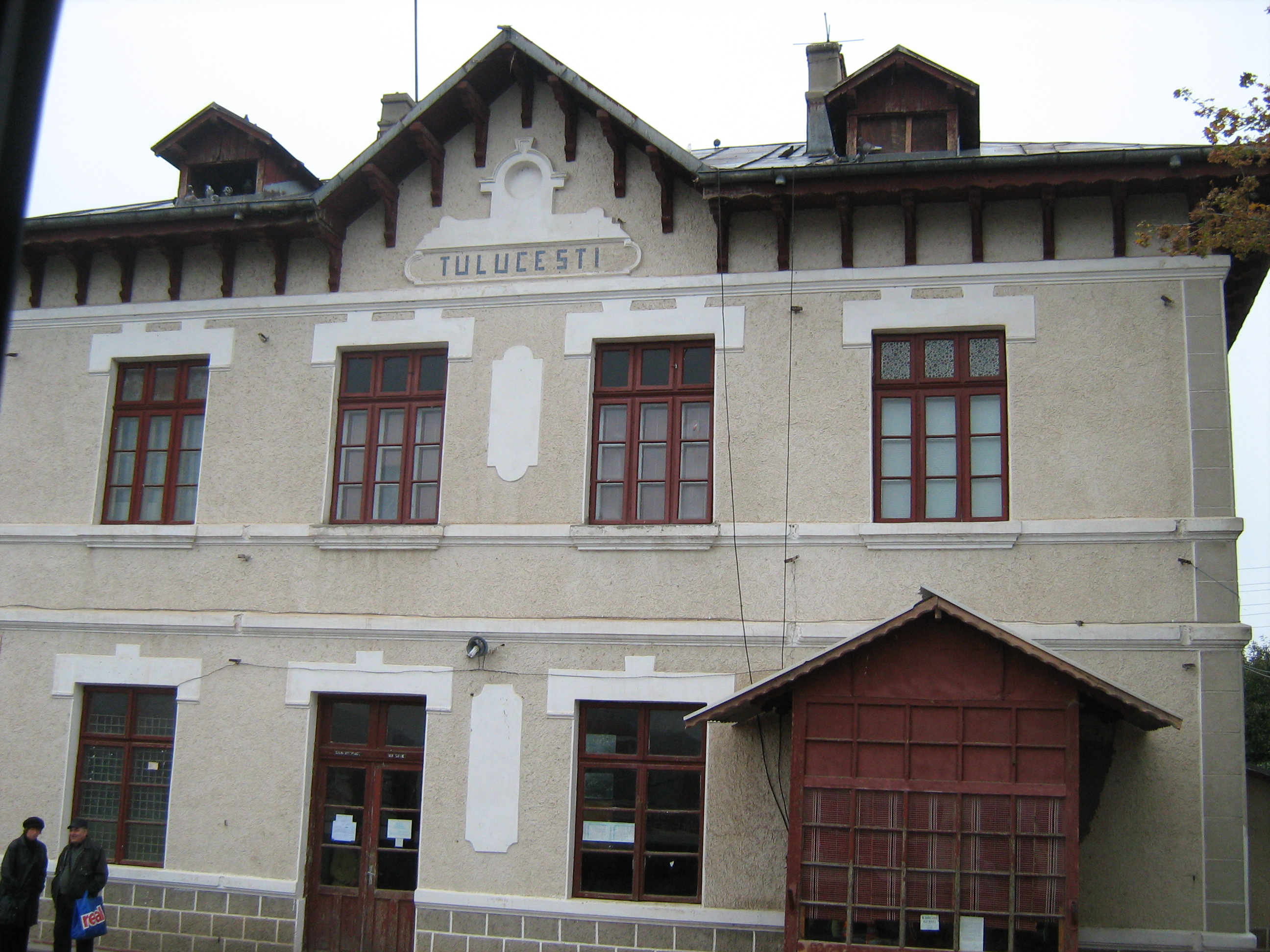
- Tulucești train station

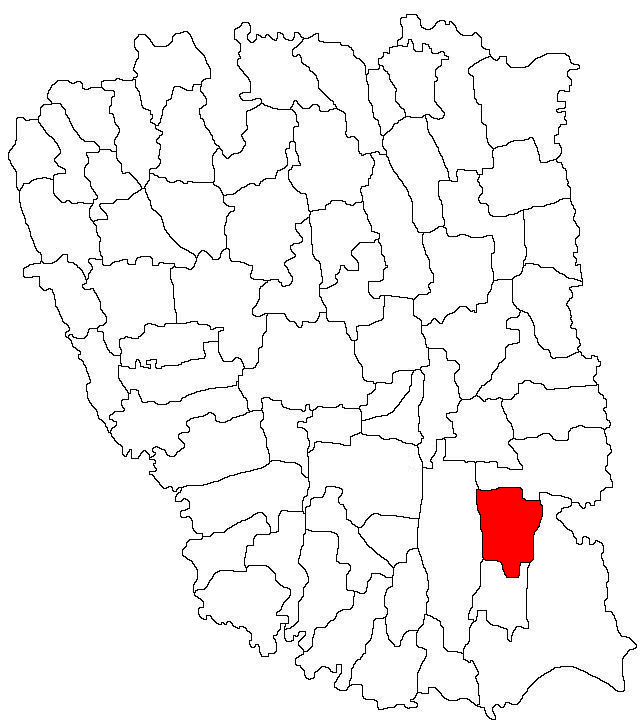
- Location in Galați County

- Location in Romania
- Coordinates: 45°34′N 28°2′E
- Country: Romania
- County: Galați

Government
  - Mayor (2020–2024): Petrică Bratu (PSD)
- Area: 77.23 km^{2} (29.82 sq mi)
- Elevation: 28 m (92 ft)
- Population (2021-12-01): 6,407
  - Density: 82.96/km^{2} (214.9/sq mi)
- Time zone: UTC+02:00 (EET)
  - Summer (DST): UTC+03:00 (EEST)
- Postal code: 807300
- Vehicle reg.: GL
- Website: www.primariatulucesti.ro

Tulucești is a commune in Galați County, Western Moldavia, Romania, with a population of 7,444 people. It is composed of three villages: Șivița, Tătarca and Tulucești.

The commune is located the southeastern part of the county, at a distance of 12 km (7.5 mi) from Galați.

Part of the Lunca Joasă a Prutului Inferior Natural Park is situated on the territory of Tulucești. The Șivița oil field is also situated within the commune.
