= Gepiu =

- Commune
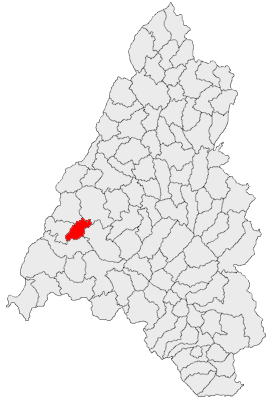
- Location in Bihor County

- Location in Romania
- Coordinates: 46°55′N 21°48′E
- Country: Romania
- County: Bihor
- Population (2021-12-01): 2,216
- Time zone: EET/EEST (UTC+2/+3)
- Vehicle reg.: BH

Gepiu (Hungarian: Gyapju) is a commune located in Bihor County, Crișana, Romania. It is composed of two villages, Bicaci (Mezőbikács) and Gepiu. These were part of Cefa Commune until 2003, when they were split off.
