= Nojorid =

- Commune
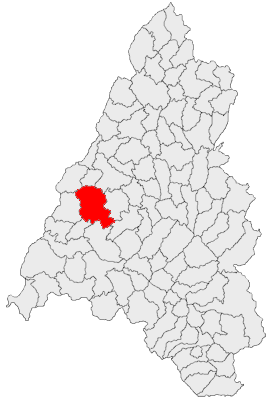
- Location in Bihor County

- Location in Romania
- Coordinates: 46°59′N 21°53′E
- Country: Romania
- County: Bihor
- Population (2021-12-01): 6,765
- Time zone: EET/EEST (UTC+2/+3)
- Vehicle reg.: BH

Nojorid (Hungarian: Nagyürögd) is a large commune located in Bihor County, Crișana, Romania. It is composed of seven villages: Apateu (Oláhapáti), Chișirid (Kisürögd), Leș (Váradles), Livada de Bihor (Mácsapuszta), Nojorid, Păușa (Váradpósa), and Șauaieu (Biharsályi).

== Natives ==
- Dumitru Radu Popescu (1935–2023), novelist, poet, dramatist, essayist, and short story writer
- Mihai Țârlea (1938–1984), footballer
