= Mădăras =

- Commune
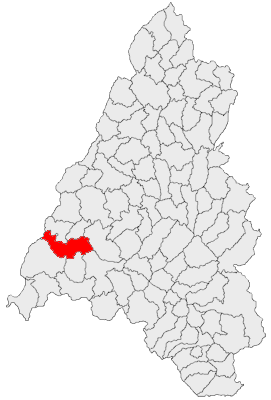
- Location in Bihor County

- Location in Romania
- Coordinates: 46°50′N 21°41′E
- Country: Romania
- County: Bihor
- Population (2021-12-01): 3,014
- Time zone: UTC+02:00 (EET)
  - Summer (DST): UTC+03:00 (EEST)
- Vehicle reg.: BH

Mădăras (Hungarian: Madarász; Slovak: Madaras) is a commune in Bihor County, Crișana, Romania, 3 km from Salonta, located nearby the Hungarian border - on the European road E671, and the Körös River canal. In 2011, it had 2,828 inhabitants. The commune's Hungarian name means "fowler", the Romanian name derives from that as well. It is composed of four villages: Homorog (Oláhhomorog), Ianoșda (Jánosd), Marțihaz (Marciháza) and Mădăras.

Homorog has a Romanian Orthodox church; built in the 1830s, it is decorated with a valuable mural from the 1840s.
