= Cefa =

- Commune
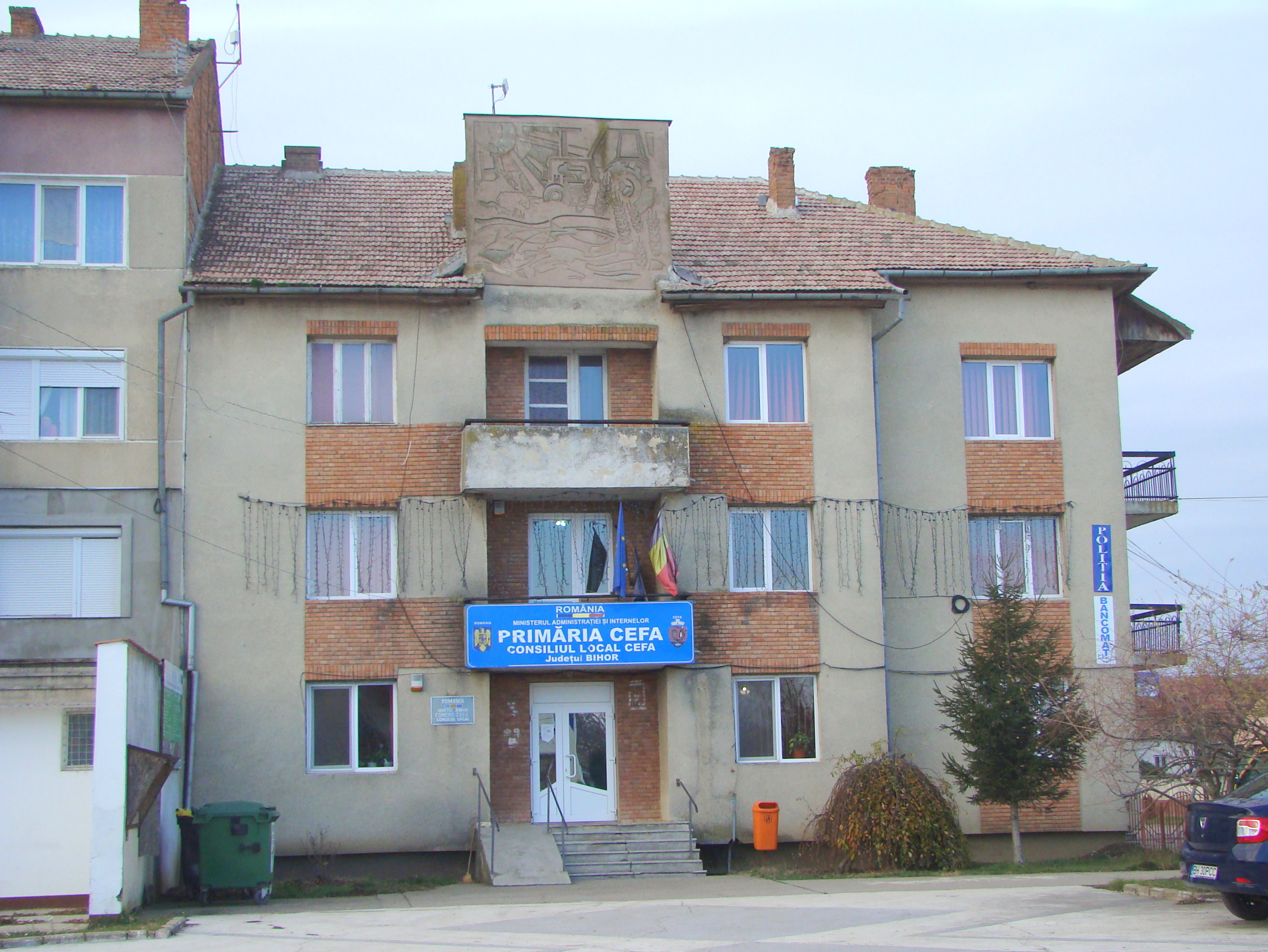
- Cefa town hall

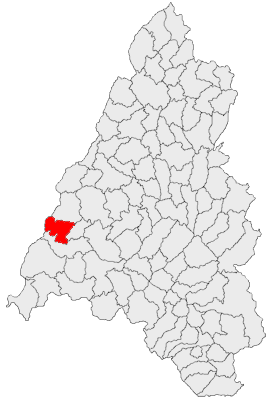
- Location in Bihor County

- Location in Romania
- Coordinates: 46°55′N 21°44′E
- Country: Romania
- County: Bihor

Government
  - Mayor (2020–2024): Dumitru-Alin Bărnău (PNL)
- Area: 71.82 km^{2} (27.73 sq mi)
- Elevation: 98 m (322 ft)
- Population (2021-12-01): 2,200
  - Density: 31/km^{2} (79/sq mi)
- Time zone: UTC+02:00 (EET)
  - Summer (DST): UTC+03:00 (EEST)
- Postal code: 417145
- Area code: +(40) 259
- Vehicle reg.: BH
- Website: cefa-bh.ro

Cefa (Hungarian: Cséffa, German: Tscheppensdorf) is a commune in Bihor County, Crișana, Romania, with a population of 2,200 people as of 2021. It is composed of three villages: Ateaș (Atyás), Cefa, and Inand (Inánd). It also included five other villages until 2003, when they were split off to form Gepiu and Sânnicolau Român communes.

The oldest attested name of Cefa is Chepha (1302).

The commune is located in the western part of Bihor County, 27 km (17 mi) southwest of the county seat, Oradea, on the border with Hungary. On its eastern side, Cefa is crossed by national road DN79 (part of European route E671), which connects Oradea to Arad.

Between the villages of Cefa and Ateaș lies part of the Cefa Natural Park, which covers an area of 5,002 ha (12,360 acres).
