= Avram Iancu, Bihor =

Avram Iancu
- Commune
- The Orthodox Church in Avram Iancu

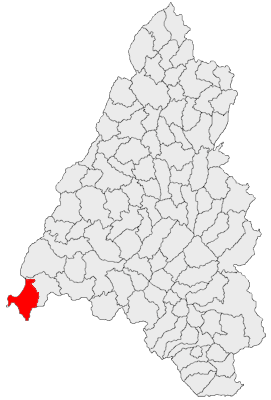
- Location in Bihor County

- Location in Romania
- Coordinates: 46°40′10″N 21°31′27″E
- Country: Romania
- County: Bihor

Government
  - Mayor (2020–2024): Dan Chirla (PNL)
- Area: 82.16 km^{2} (31.72 sq mi)
- Elevation: 84 m (276 ft)
- Population (2021-12-01): 3,043
  - Density: 37.04/km^{2} (95.93/sq mi)
- Time zone: UTC+02:00 (EET)
  - Summer (DST): UTC+03:00 (EEST)
- Postal code: 417035
- Area code: +40 x59
- Vehicle reg.: BH
- Website: www.primaria-avram-iancu.ro

Avram Iancu (until 1932 Chemenfoc, from 1932 to 1950 Regina Maria; German: Kemmen; Hungarian: Keményfok) is a commune in Bihor County, in Crișana, Romania. The commune is composed of three villages: Ant (Ant), Avram Iancu and Tămașda (Tamáshida). The majority of the population (96%) in Avram Iancu village is Romanian. Overall, the commune is 74.7% Romanian, 15.6% Roma, and 9.6% Hungarian. The architecture of the commune is typical for a Romanian field village: the main street traverses the village, houses being equally distributed along it.

== Location ==
Geographically, it is situated at the border of Bihor County with Arad County and with Hungary, at exactly the same distance, 60 km (37 mi), from the capital cities of the two counties, Oradea and Arad. The commune is crossed by the European road E671. The nearest city is Salonta, 18 km (11 mi) to the north.

== History ==
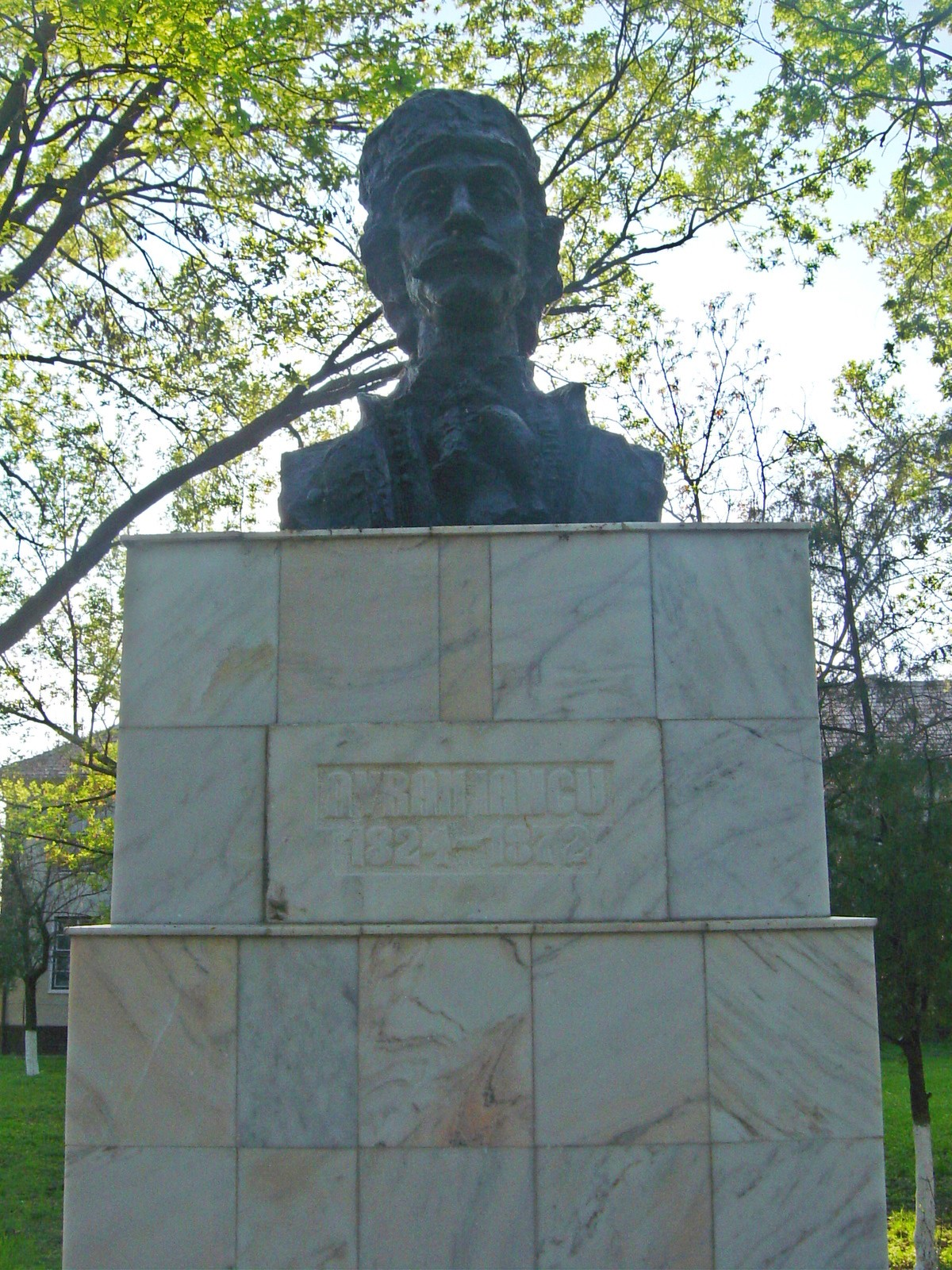
The Monument of Avram Iancu

The first official documentation of human settlement in the area dates back to 1169. The document mentions a very small village called Villa Tamasd, which in fact is the village Tămașda, a component of the today commune. In the early 1600s, the establishment was destroyed when it was caught in a battle between the Turkish and Hungarian armies. In 1700 the establishment and its surroundings were transformed into a fiefdom for a Hungarian noble.

Today's village of Avram Iancu was founded in the early 1900s by Romanian colonists who came from the eastern region of Bihor County. They received here land from King Ferdinand I of Romania, the village being named Regina Maria after Ferdinand's wife, Queen Marie. In 1950, under the Communist regime, it was renamed after the 1848 Revolution Romanian hero Avram Iancu.

== Economy ==
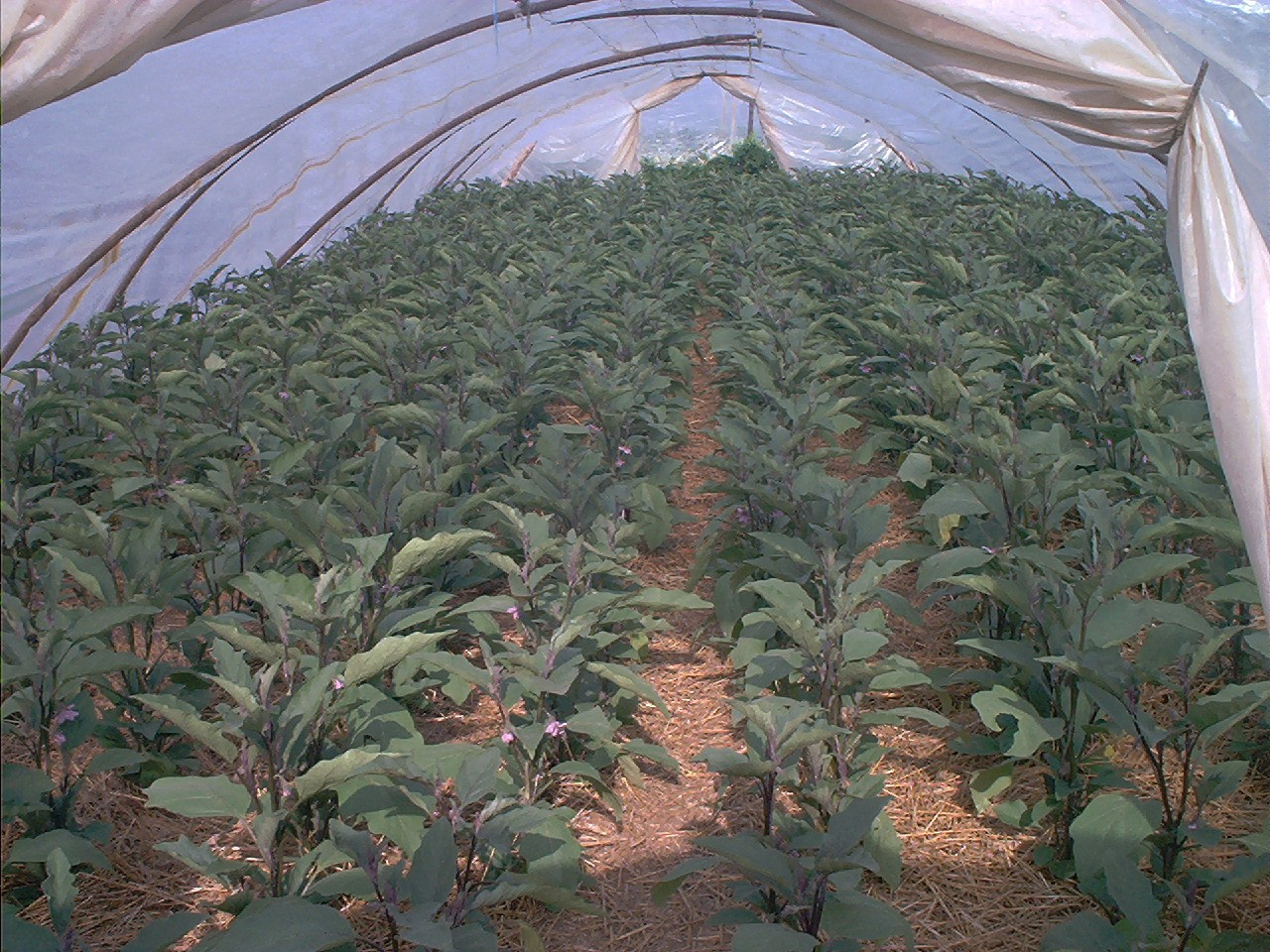
Eggplant crop in Avram Iancu

Due to its fertile lands Avram Iancu is one of the biggest producers of agricultural products (vegetables) within Bihor County, supplying the markets for the neighboring cities with fresh high-quality vegetable products. During the communist times, there were just a few households doing intensive production on very small surfaces of land. After the Romanian Revolution of 1989 the proportion of households employed in this activity boosted to over 80%, more than a half being specialized in extensive cultures on large areas of land.

== Natives ==
- Iosif Matula (born 1958), engineer and politician
- Dănilă Papp (1868–1950), Romanian officer who served in World War I and the Hungarian–Romanian War
