= Slovaks in Romania =

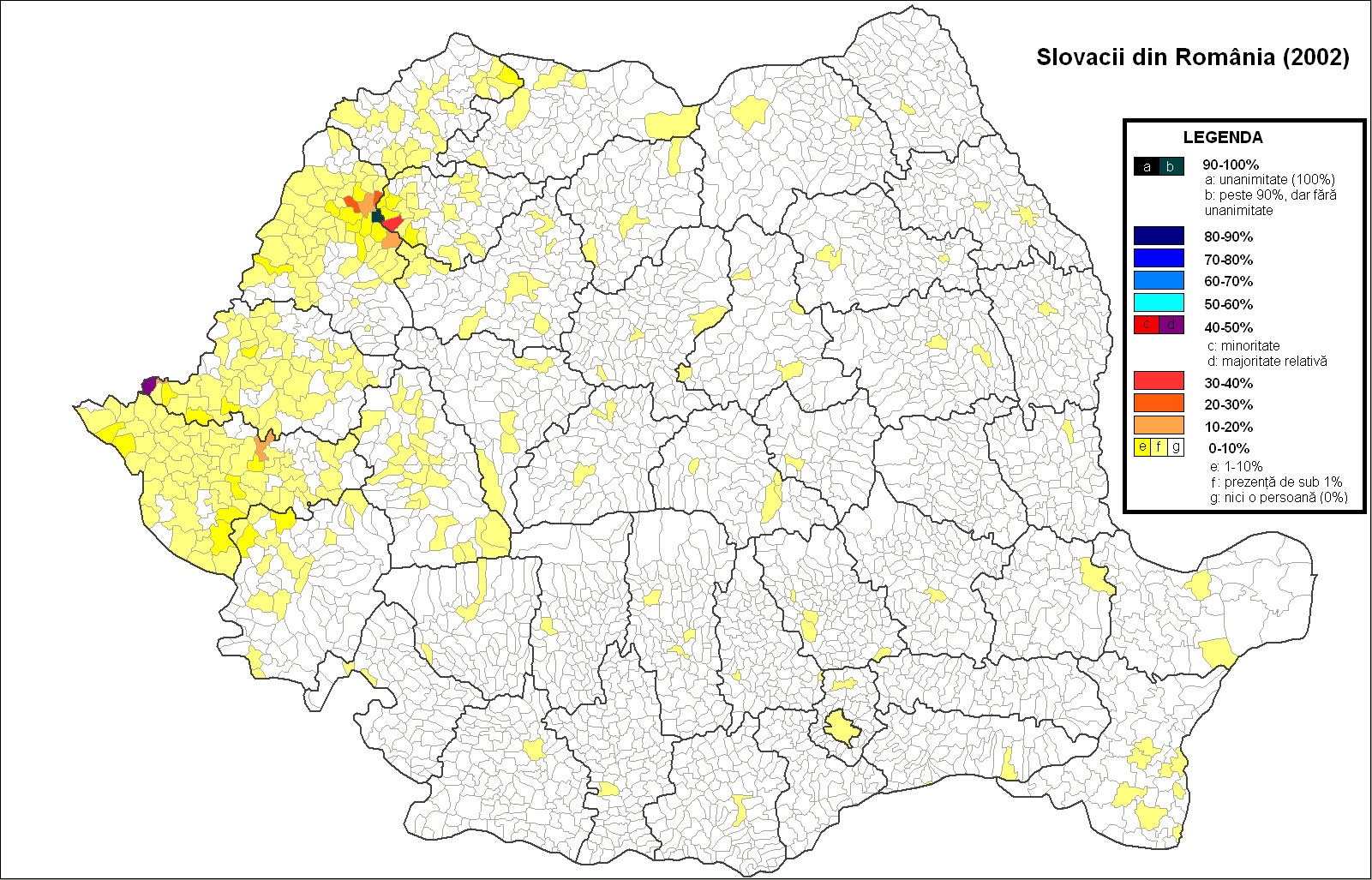
Distribution of Slovaks in Romania (2002 census)

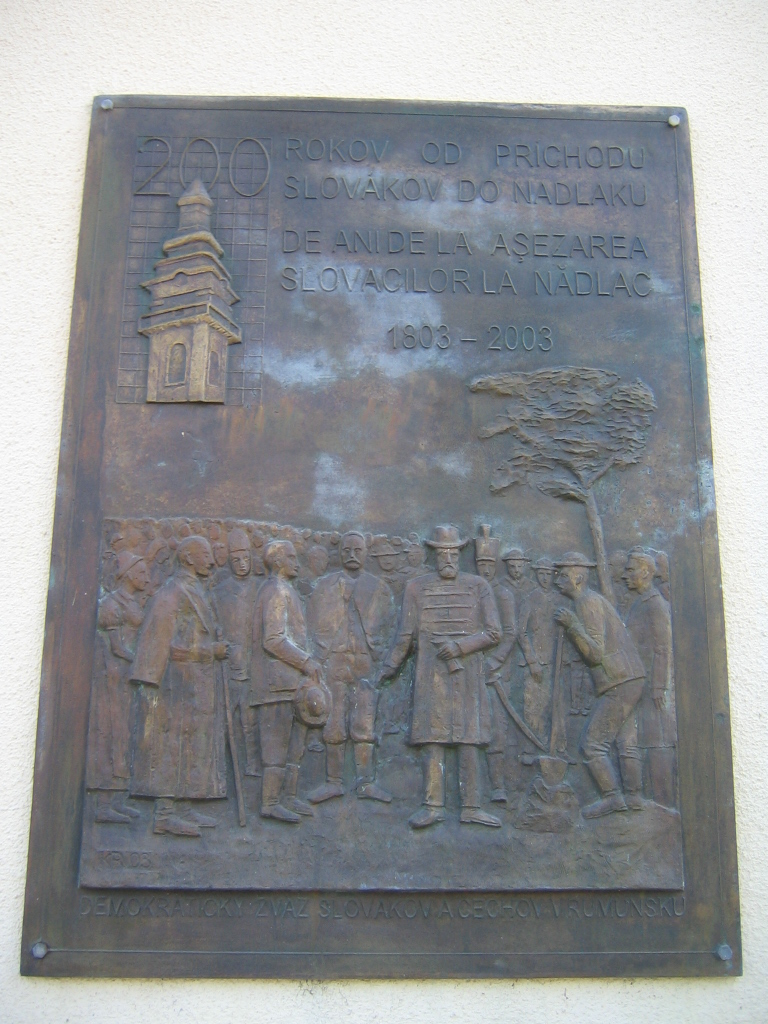
Plaque marking the 1803 settlement of Slovaks in Nădlac, Arad County

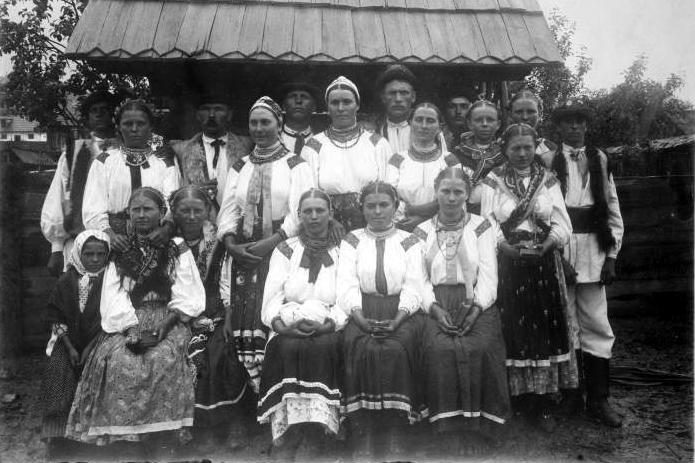
Slovaks in traditional costumes in Bukovina

The Slovaks (Slováci in Slovak, slovaci in Romanian) are an ethnic minority in Romania, numbering 17,199 people according to the 2002 census and hence making up 0.1% of the total population. Slovaks mainly live in western Romania, with the largest populations found in Bihor and Arad counties, where they make up 1.22% and 1.25% of the population, respectively.

The largest concentrations of ethnic Slovaks can be found in Șinteu (Nová Huta), Bihor County, where they make up nearly all (96.37%) of the population, and in Nădlac (Nadlak), Arad County, where they make up almost half (43.85%) of the population. Other towns and communes with significant Slovak populations include:

- Arad County
  - Peregu Mare (Slovak: Veľký Pereg) — 12.87%
  - Olari — 4.07%
  - Sintea Mare — 4.94%
  - Fântânele — 3.36%
  - Vinga — 2.45%
- Bihor County
  - Derna — 19.22%
  - Suplacu de Barcău (Slovak: Siplak) — 18.41%
  - Popești (Slovak: Popešť) — 12.93%
  - Mădăras (Slovak: Madaras) — 7.03%
  - Aleșd (Slovak: Alešď) — 6.18%
  - Lugașu de Jos (Slovak: Lugaše) — 6.28%
  - Aușeu (Slovak: Aušeu) — 5.63%
  - Brusturi — 4.64%
  - Aștileu — 4.35%
  - Sârbi — 2.68%
- Caraș-Severin County
  - Berzovia — 1.69%
- Satu Mare County
  - Certeze — 1.57%
- Sălaj County
  - Plopiș (Slovak: Plopiš) — 32.01%
  - Sâg — 2.99%
  - Ip — 2.49%
  - Marca — 1.92%
  - Halmășd — 1.25%
- Timiș County
  - Brestovăț — 15.13%
  - Chevereșu Mare — 4.44%
  - Topolovățu Mare — 2.48%
  - Tormac — 1.17%
  - Comloșu Mare — 1.07%

As an officially recognized ethnic minority, Slovaks, together with Czechs, have one seat reserved in the Romanian Chamber of Deputies.

== See also ==
- Romania–Slovakia relations
- Slovak diaspora
- Immigration to Romania
- Romanians in Slovakia
- Czechs of Romania
