= Slovak diaspora =

Emigration from Slovakia

The Slovak diaspora refers to both historical and present emigration from Slovakia, as well as from the former Czechoslovakia. The country with the largest number of Slovaks living abroad is the United States.

== Slovak diaspora in Romania ==
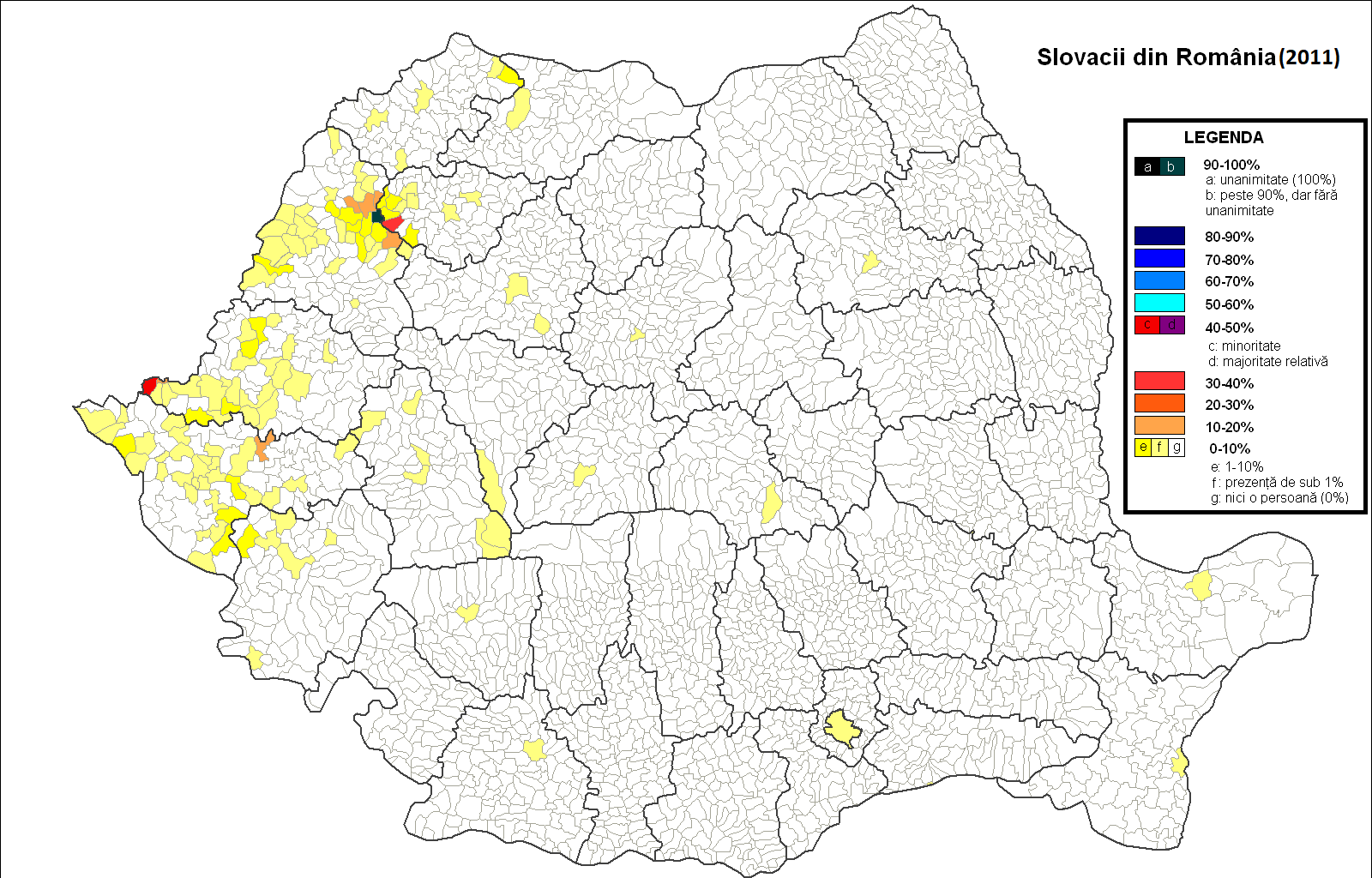
Slovaks in Romania in 2011

Approximately 17,000-21,000 ethnic Slovaks live in Romania. The largest Slovak communities live in the following counties:

1. Bihor RO, Bihar SK (7,370)
2. Arad RO & SK (5,695)
3. Timiș RO, Temeš SK(1,908)
4. Sălaj RO, Salaš SK (1,366)
5. Caraș-Severin RO, Krašovsko-severinská župa SK (340)
6. Satu Mare RO, Satmárska župa SK (186)
7. Hunedoara RO, Huňadská župa SK (100)

The Slovak diaspora in Romania could be divided into two major groups:

=== Group 1: The Slovaks of Arad county ===
This group could be found in the flat Romanian county of Banat, especially around the town of Nădlac, RO (Nadlak, SK). In the sense of economy and culture, this is quite a developed society, in Nădlac, RO (Nadlak, SK), there is a Slovak school operating and Slovak books get printed there. The Slovaks in the county of Arad are descendants of the secondary colonizing generations - meaning, the Slovak communities re-settled there from Békéscsaba, HU (Békečská Čaba, SK), in Hungary in the 19th century. Today, Slovaks create in the town of Nădlac alone almost half of its population.

According to the 2011 census, the ethnic structure of Nădlac is:

- Romanians 47.26%
- Slovaks 43.85%
- Roma 5.1%
- Hungarians 2.37%
- Others 1.75%

=== Group 2: The Slovaks of Munții Plopiș highlands (Bihar & Sălaj counties) ===
Munții Plopiș, RO (Plopišské Vrchy, SK) are a part of the Romanian mountains located to the east of the city of Oradea, on a border of two counties - Bihor, RO (Bihar, SK) and Sălaj, RO (Salaš, SK). The Slovaks living there are the descendants of the colonials arriving in three waves between 1790 and 1838. A big part of the Plopiš highlands Slovaks took part in the Czecho-Slovak emigration after the World War 2. They settled in Czechia, along the border of Slovakia, where they create a specific society today.

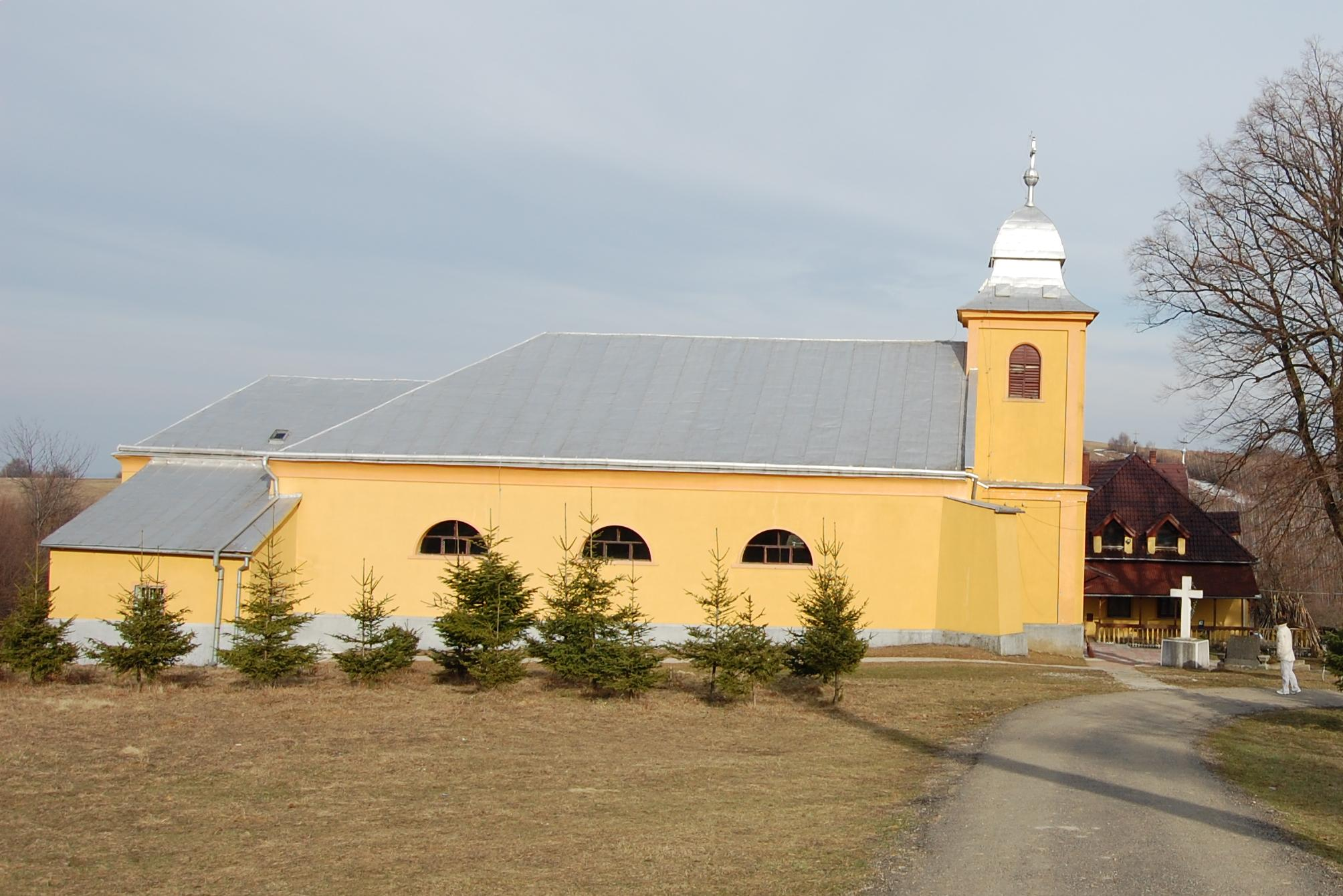
A Slovak Catholic church in Șinteu, Nová Huta, Romania

Bihor county is mostly mountainous. Localities where the Slovak communities live can be found on these mountains, such as Șinteu, RO (Nová Huta, SK); Făgetu, RO (Gemelčička, SK); Șerani, RO (Šarany, SK); Sacalasău Nou, RO (Nový Šastelek, SK); Marca Huta, RO (Bojovksé, SK); Budoi, RO (Bodonoš, SK); Valea Cerului, RO (Čerpotok, SK); Borumlaca -Vărzari, RO (Boromlak - Varzaľ, SK); Fegernic RO & SK; Lugașu de Jos, RO (Lugaše, SK); Zăuan-Băi, RO (Zavaň, SK).

A village with the highest number of Slovaks is a part of this group - Șinteu, RO (Nová Huta, SK), located in the Bihor county, according to census in 2002, from the total number of inhabitants 1.287, the Slovaks were numbered at 1.264. There is a Slovak school or a kindergarten in almost every village. The Slovak highschool Jozef Kozáček High School is also located in Budoi. Teachers are sent to two schools by the Ministry of Education, Science, Research and Sports of the Slovak Republic (in Șinteu and Făgetu), who work in the area as support for Slovak compatriots. In almost every village there are Slovak priests who are natives of this area.

=== Religious structure of the Slovak diaspora in Romania ===
The religious structure of Slovaks in Romania could be also divided into two sections. The majority of Bihor county Slovaks are Roman Catholics, meanwhile the majority of Arad county Slovaks are Lutherans. Due to intermarriages, we can also see some Orthodox and Byzantine Catholics among them.

According to the census from 2020, this is religious structure of the Slovak diaspora in Romania overall:

1. Roman Catholics 67.22%
2. Lutherans 17.65%
3. Orthodox 3.94%
4. Pentecostal 3.62%
5. Byzantine Catholics 3.52%
6. Other or unaffiliated 4.92%

=== Political representation of the ethnic Slovaks in Romania ===
Since the Slovaks are officially recognised as an ethnic minority in Romania, they share together with Czechs a common representative Adrian Merka since 2008 for Democratic Union of Czechs and Slovaks in Romania.

=== Education ===
In 1995, the second Slovak lyceum in Romania was established in the Slovak locality of Budoi, RO (Bodonoš, SK) in the Bihor-Sălaj county, which was named after the important Slovak canon in Oradea, RO (Veľký Varadín, SK) Jozef Kozáček (Jozef Kozáček High School). This high school is focused on the study of languages and is studied mainly by students from the surrounding Slovak communities.

At present, there are 2 Slovak high schools in Romania (in Nădlac and in Budoi) - and there are also primary schools for the I. - VIII. year, another 3 primary schools for I. - VIII. years are in Huta Voivozi, RO (Stará Huta, SK); Făgetu, RO (Gemelčička, SK) and Șerani, RO (Šarany, SK), and in addition, there are also 12 other primary schools in Slovakia for Slovaks for years I. - IV. and 14 nurseries as well. On top of that, Slovak as a mother tongue is taught in several other schools as well.

=== Significant localities with Slovak population in Romania ===
Slovaks in Romania
Romanian name	Slovak name	total population	Slovak population	Total Percentage of Slovaks
Aleșd	Alešď	10,415	645	6.2%
Aştileu	Aštileu	3,791	173	4.6%
Auşeu	Aušeu	3,049	198	6.5%
Borod, mainly the settlement of Şerani	Borod, mainly the settlement of Šarany	4,173	500	12%
Brestovăţ	Brestovac	818	151	18.5%
Budoi, including Vărzari and Voivozi	Bodonoš, including Varzaľ a Vojvoz	1,127	821	72.8%
Butin	Butín	463	380	82%
Făgetu	Gemelčička		842	
Fântânele	Fantanele	5,692	159	2.8%
Iosifalău	Iosifalva			
Ipp	Ip	3,946	111	2.8%
Lugaşu de Sus & Lugaşu de Jos	Lugaše - Nižný a Vyšný			
Lugoj	Lugoš	44,636	77	0.2%
Luncşoara	Lunkšora			
Marca	Markasek	2,966	96	3.2%
Mădăras	Madarás	3,020	226	7.5%
Marca Huta	Bojovské			
Marghita	Margita	17,291	82	0.5%
Mocrea	Mokrá			
Nădlac	Nadlak	8,154	3,844	47.1%
Nusfălau	Nadfaluby			
Oradea	Veľký Varadín	206,614	474	0.2%
Pădurea Neagră	Bystrá			
Peregu M.are	Veľký Pereg	1,800	329	18.3%
Peştiş	Peštiš	1,454	155	11.7%
Plopiş	Plopiš	2,791	901	32.3%
Popeşt	Popešť	8,488	1,305	15.4%
Sacalaşău Nou	Derma, mainly the settlement of Nový Šastelek	3,020	288	9.5%
Suplacu de Barcău, Borumlaca, Foglaş, Vâlcelele	Siplak, Boromolaka, Fogaš, Ritoblaga	4,610	934	20.3%
Şemlac	Semlak	3,787	42	1.1%
Şimleu Silvaniei	Šomľov	10,137	39	0.4%
Șinteu and Huta Voivozi; Socet and Valea Tîrnei	Nová Huta and Stará Huta; Huta Sočet including Zachotár and Židáreň	1,287	1,264	98.2%
Ţipar	Cipár	1,410	413	29.3%
Tileagd	Telegda			
Topolovăţul Mare	Topoľovec			
Teş	Teš			
Urvind	Urvinda			
Valea Cerului	Čerpotok	444	427	96.2%
Varasău	Harasov and Termezov			
	Vagaše			
Vucova	Vuková			
Zăuan-Băi	Zavaň			

The data are from 2002 and 1992.

== Slovak diaspora in Serbia ==
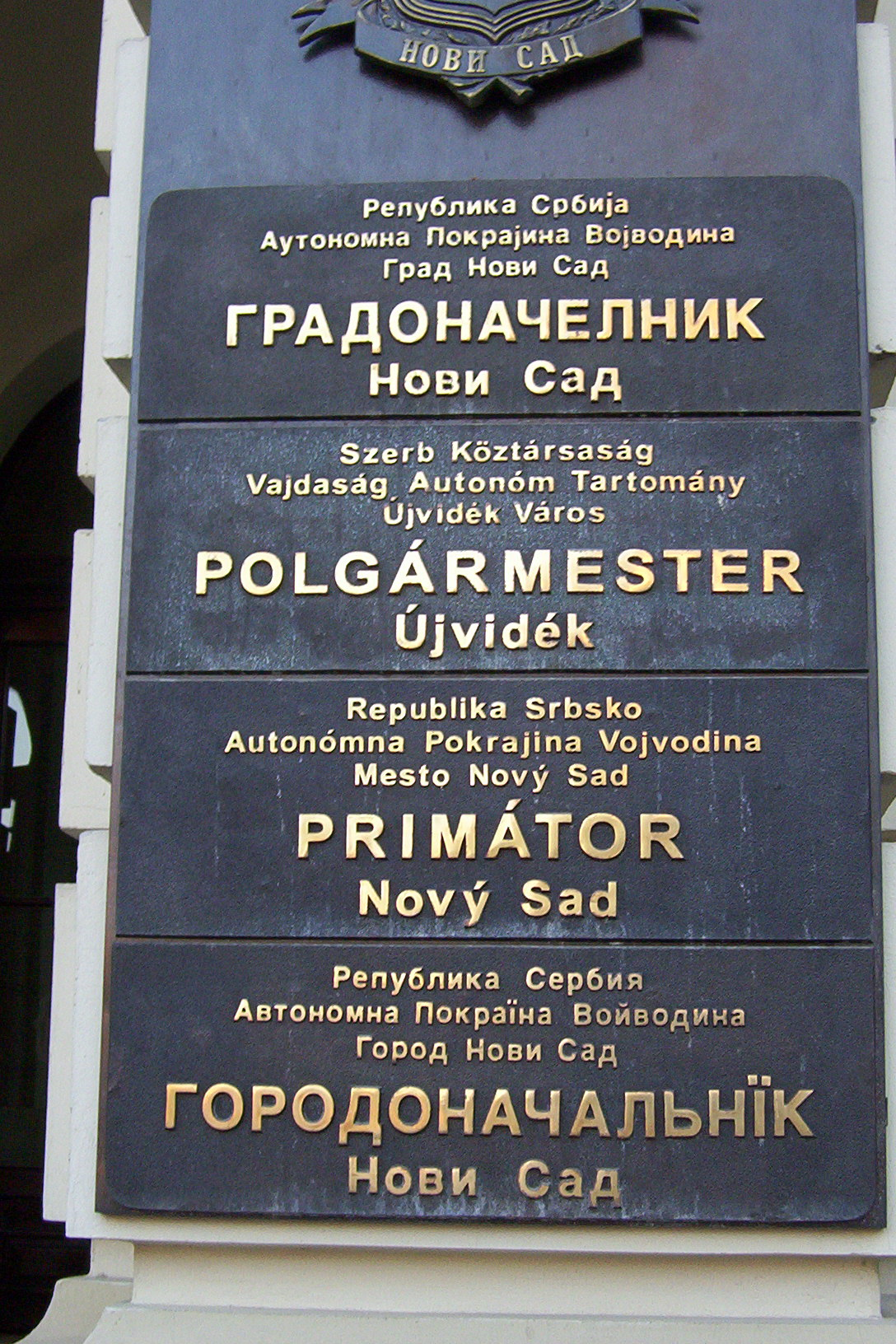
Plaque of the Novi Sad Mayor Office in four official languages of Vojvodina. Serbian, Hungarian, Slovak, Panonian Ruthenian

Slovaks are the sixth-largest ethnic group in Serbia, the majority of whom live in the province of Vojvodina. According to the 2022 census, they form an absolute majority in the Bački Petrovac SRB, Báčsky Petrovec SK municipality (66.4%) and they are the most numerous ethnicity in the Kovačica municipality (41%).

Slovaks in Serbia are descendants of mostly Lutheran emigrants from the 18th and 19th centuries, who settled in the Vojvodina region, sparsely inhabited after its devastation by the Ottomans. The main causes of Slovak emigration were difficult economic and social conditions, considerable overcrowding and a lack of existential opportunities in their native regions.

According to the 2022 census, the largest Slovak communities are in:

1. Bački Petrovac SRB (Báčsky Petrovec SK)
2. Kovačica SRB and SK
3. Stara Pazova SRB (Stará Pazova SK)
4. Padina SRB and SK
5. Kovačica
6. Kisač SRB (Kysáč SK)

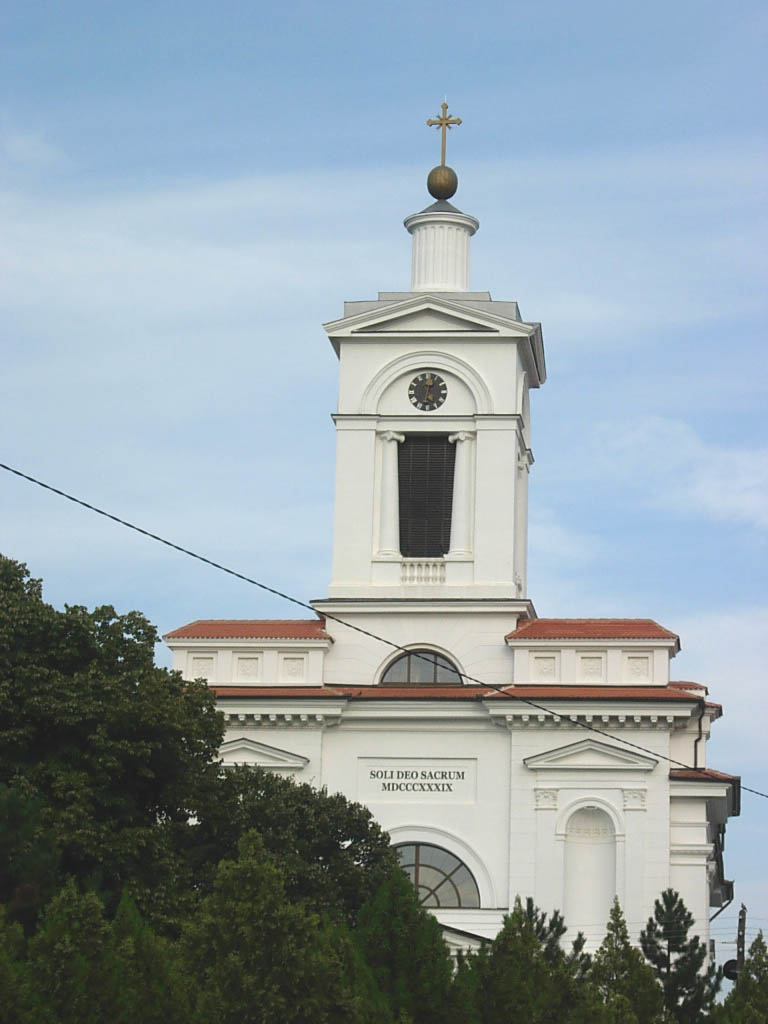
Slovak Lutheran church in Padina, Serbia

Biggest Slovak community towns and villages in Serbia
Village or town in Slovak	Village or town in Serbian	Number of inhabitants	Number of Slovaks	Total percentage of Slovaks
Padina	Падина (Padina)	5,760	5,575	96.8%
Lug	Луг (Lug)	801	772	96.4%
Jánošík	Јаношик (Janošik)	1,171	1,073	91.6%
Selenča	Селенча (Selenča)	3,279	2,990	91.2%
Báčsky Petrovec	Бачки Петровац (Bački Petrovac)	6,727	5,949	88.4%
Hložany	Гложан (Gložan)	2,283	1,985	86.9%
Kovačica	Ковачица (Kovačica)	6,764	5,697	84.2%
Kysáč	Кисач (Kisač)	5,471	4,505	82.3%
Pivnica	Пивнице (Pivnice)	3,835	2,935	76.5%
Slankamenské Vinohrady	Сланкаменачки Виногради (Slankamenački Vinogradi)	266	199	74.8%
Kulpín	Кулпин (Kulpin)	2,976	2,116	71.1%
Laliť	Лалић (Lalić)	1,646	796	48.4%
Hajdušica	Хајдучица (Hajdučica)	1,375	579	42.1%
Aradáč	Арадац (Aradac)	3,461	1,376	39.8%
Belo Blato	Бело Блато (Belo Blato)	1,477	583	39.5%
Silbaš	Силбаш (Silbaš)	2,849	1,018	35.7%
Bingula	Бингула (Bingula)	906	306	33.8%
Stará Pazova	Стара Пазова (Stara Pazova)	18,645	5,848	31.4%

The data are from 2002 census.

== Slovak diaspora in Croatia ==
The Slovak diaspora in Croatia is concentrated mainly in the area of the town of Osijek in the Osijek-Baranja County (districts of Našice, Djakovo, Novska, Osijek, Vukovar). A number of Slovaks also live in the Sisak area. Despite its small number, the Slovak minority in Croatia has significant cultural rights. There are some important Slovak institutions such as Matica Slovenská.

Slovak diaspora in Croatia in 2011
Name	Total population	Slovaks in number/%
Osijec-Barajn County:	305,032	2,293 / 0.75%
Našice	16,224	1,078 / 6.64%
Koška	3,980	55 / 1.38%
Punitovci	1,803	666 / 36.94%
Sisak-Moslava County	172,439	212 / 0.12%
Lipovljani	3,455	106 / 3.07%
Vukovar-Sriem County	179,521	1,185 / 0.66%
Ilok	6,767	935 / 13.82%
Vrbanja	3,940	69 / 1.75%

The data are from census of 2011.

== Slovak diaspora in Hungary ==
Slovaks are the third largest ethnic minority in Hungary. According to the official census, their number ranges from 17.693 to 110.000, which is an estimate of the Slovak organizations with seat in Hungary.

=== History of the Slovak diaspora in Hungary ===
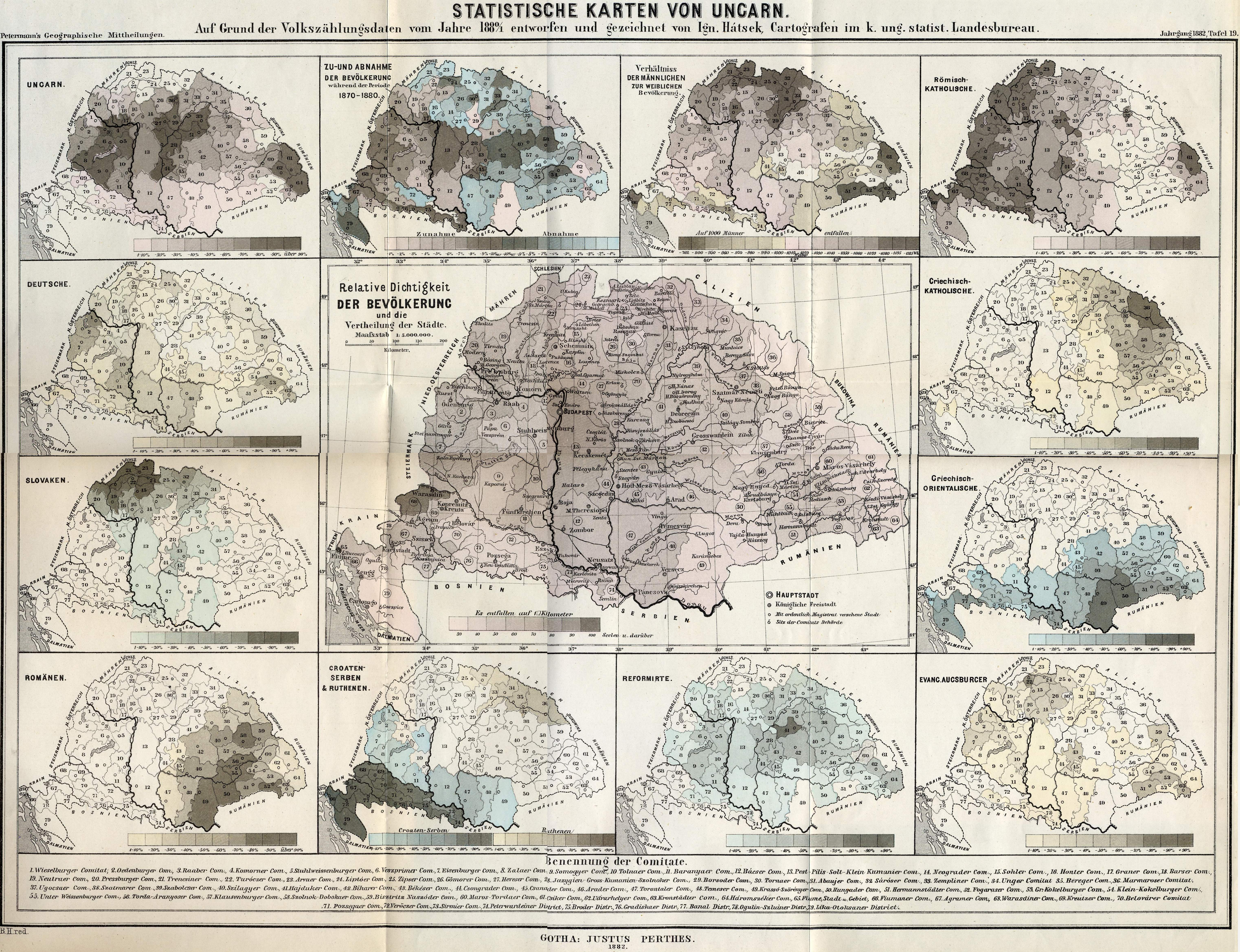
Population of Hungary according to the census in 1880, Slovaks are in the third picture from top left

Slovaks lived in what is today's modern Hungary, especially northern Hungary, in many villages at least until the late Middle Ages as a remnant of Slavic settlement living there already before the arrival of the Hungarians. Developments in the coming period remain unexplored due to lack of objective interest from the Hungarian authorities for the time being, with the exception of Hungarian biased nationalist circles spreading inaccurate information. Most Slovaks came to the territory of today's Hungary as part of the settlement of the so-called Lower Lands (Serbia, Romania, Croatia) after the defeat of the Ottoman Empire, more precisely from the end of the 17th to the 19th century. In addition to the traditional Slovak-language islands in Hungarian territory, the former Pest County in 1790 was 52% Slovak., in Pest in 1829 there were just as many Slovaks as there were Hungarians and in 1900 there were about 100,000 Slovaks living in Budapest, the capital of Hungary (Budapest was the city with the largest number of Slovaks in Europe, hence the negative perception from the Hungarians today). In the area between Budapest and today's Slovak border, Slovaks still lived in about half of the villages in 1880s and 1890s, in several areas they even made up more than 50% or 100%. In Nyíregyháza (founded in 1749 as a Slovak settlement) in the 1980s, 8,600 Slovaks lived in addition to more than 13,000 Hungarians, and these Slovaks were called Tirpák. Szeged also had a large Slovak population at the beginning of the 19th century.

In 1920, according to the official Hungarian census, Slovaks still lived as a minority in Hungary in 78 municipalities, with the majority in 41 municipalities (50-75% 21 municipalities, 75-100% 20 municipalities). At that time, more than 500 Slovaks lived in the counties of Székesfehérvár HU (Stoličný Belehrad SK), Komárno SK (Komárom, HU), Veszprém HU (Vesprém SK), Esztergom HU (Ostrihom, SK), Hont SK & HU, Novohrad SK (Nógrád HU), Csongrád HU (Čongrad SK), Heves HU (Heveš SK), Jász-Nagykun-Szolnok HU (Jasovsko-Veľkokumánsko-Solnocká župa SK), Pest-Pilis-Solt-Kiskun HU (Peštiansko-pilišsko-šoltsko-malokumánska župa SK), Budapest HU (Budapešť SK), Borsod-Abaúj-Zemplén HU (Abovsko-Turnianska, Boršadská SK). In 1920, 59.464 of the officially led Slovaks were Roman Catholic, 75.229 were Lutherans, 7.723 were Calvinists, 734 were Jews, the rest (approx. 850) were of other religions. The exchange of population between Czechoslovakia and Hungary in the late 1940s reduced their number by about 70.000.

Today, Slovaks still live in Békés HU (Békešská župa SK), Borsod-Abaúj-Zemplén HU (Abovsko-Turnianska, Boršadská župa SK), Komárom-Esztergom HU (Komárno-Ostrihom SK), Novohrad SK (Nógrád HU) and Pest HU (Pešť SK) counties and in the capital Budapest. Their center is Békéscsaba HU (Békešská Čaba SK). Since the 1990s, they have had national Slovak self-government and self-government at the regional level. The weekly newspapers Ľudové noviny also has an online edition. There are two national Slovak grammar schools in the country - in Budapest and in Békešská Čaba (Békesczaba HU), compared to the 19 Hungarian ones functioning in Slovakia. The modern settlement of Slovaks in Hungary is mainly related to the hinterland of Bratislava, the Slovak capital, while the percentage of approximately 50% was reached by ethnic Slovaks in the village of Rajka.

=== Numbers of Slovaks in Hungary since 1880 ===
Number of Slovaks in Hungary according to official Hungarian Kingdoms / Hungarian statistics:

- 1880:
  - in the whole of Kingdom of Hungary including both present day Slovakia and present-day Hungary: 1,855,000 Slovaks + 219,404 Hungarians fluent in Slovak (a total of 2,074,404 people)
  - in the whole of Kingdom of Hungary except present day Slovakia territory: 365.293 Slovaks + unknown number of Hungarians fluent in Slovak.
- 1900 **: only in counties of Székesfehérvár HU (Stoličný Belehrad SK), Pest-Pilis-Solt-Kiskun (Peštiansko-pilišsko-šoltsko-malokumánska župa SK), Borsod HU (Bošrod SK), Békés HU (Békeš SK), Esztergom HU (Ostrihom SK), Csanád HU (Čanád) and Budapest HU (Budapešť SK) 161,636 Slovaks.
- 1910 **:
  - in the whole of Kingdom of Hungary including both present day Slovakia and present day Hungary: 1,946,000 * Slovaks + 547,802 Hungarians fluent in Slovak (a total of 2,493,802 people)
  - in the whole of Kingdom of Hungary except present day Slovakia territory: 261,319* Slovaks + unknown number of Hungarians fluent in Slovak.
  - only in counties of Székesfehérvár HU (Stoličný Belehrad SK), Pest-Pilis-Solt-Kiskun (Peštiansko-pilišsko-šoltsko-malokumánska župa SK), Borsod HU (Bošrod SK), Békés HU (Békeš SK), Esztergom HU (Ostrihom SK), Csanád HU (Čanád) and Budapest HU (Budapešť SK) 145,007 Slovaks + 158,747 Hungarians fluent in Slovak (a total of 303,754 people)
- 1920: 141,882 Slovaks + 257,294* Hungarians fluent in Slovak (a total of 399,176 people)
- 1930: 104,819 Slovaks
- 1941: 75,920 Slovaks (mother tongue; within the borders of today's Hungary only)
- 1945-1949: Hungary dismissed 71,969 Slovaks, 7,783 of which illegally, 4,230 before population exchange, the rest within population exchange.
- 1949 ***: 25,988 Slovaks (by mother tongue)
- 1990: 10,459 Slovaks; 12,745 persons with Slovak mother tongue; 68,852 persons fluent in Slovak.
- 2001: 17,693 Slovaks; 11,816 persons with Slovak mother tongue; 18,056 persons fluent in Slovak.

Data up to 1920 are from, later data are generally available in several sources.

According to contemporary Czech-Slovak sources, 630,000 lived in present-day Hungary at the time of the disintegration of Hungarian Kingdom, 350 000 – 450 000, 450,000 / 500,000 – 550,000 of Slovaks. The above-mentioned sums of Slovaks and Hungarians speaking Slovaks also speak in favor of a number between 400,000 and 500,000 in 1918 (this number has been growing steadily in recent Hungarian censuses, although the teaching of Slovak has been declining - in the end it was practically non-existent) and thus Hungarians had no reason to learn the language) according to the Hungarian censuses, as well as the fact that in 1946 the Czech-Slovak commission preparing for the exchange of the population directly in Hungary counted 473,556 Slovaks applying for the exchange. As of 1990 and 2001, it is stated that the actual number of Slovaks in Hungary is 70,000 or respectively 110,000. In summary, according to statistics, the number of Slovaks in Hungary decreased, depending on the source, from 400,000 - 500,000 / over 300,000 / 145,000 at the beginning of the 20th century to today's official 18,000 people, a decrease in the number of nationalities by 95.5% / 94.2% / 87.5% in only 80 years [without deducting population change. at a height of approx. 70,000 people]. Today, the number of Slovaks is paradoxically higher in distant Serbia or Romania, although there were significantly fewer Slovaks in these countries than in Hungary at the time of the disintegration of Hungarian Kingdom.

==== Notes ====
* The "mother tongue" was officially mentioned here, but this mother tongue was de facto defined in the official instructions for the census commissioners as the most frequently used language, the language the person spoke "most willingly". (It was not possible to determine whether this also applies to the 1930 census and later)

** Census data from 1910 (similarly from 1900) are skewed to the detriment of non-Hungarians mainly due to a specially defined issue implemented by Hungarian census commissioners (see *), further distortion proves the discrepancy of numbers with the development of birth rates and mortality of individual nationalities and demographically impossible increases of the Hungarian population in individual municipalities compared to previous censuses (so-called statistical Hungarianization)

*** If we compare this number with the data from 1941 and the numbers of the population exchange, we will also get a "deficit" of 22,037 Slovaks at the level of official statistics.

=== Famous Slovaks from the present-day Hungary territory before 1918 ===
- Ondrej Beňo
- Samuel Tešedík
- Ján Valašťan Dolinský
- Matej Markovič
- Samuel Mojžišovič
- Ľudovít Augustín Haan
- Sándor Petőfi (considered himself Hungarian but was of Slovak descent)

=== Famous Slovaks from the present-day Hungary territory after 1918 ===
- Gregor Papuček
- Jozef Markuš
- Juraj Antal Dolnozemský
- Ondrej Francisci
- Pavel Ondrus
- Pál Závada
- Štefan Markuš

==== Famous sportsmen ====
- Ladislav Kubala

=== Culture of Slovak diaspora in Hungary ===
- Ľudové noviny, a weekly in Slovak
- National Slovak self-government Budapest
- Research Institute of Slovaks in Hungary
- Institute of Slovak Culture in Hungary
- House of Slovak Culture in Békéšská Čaba
- Internet portal

=== Education ===
- Slovak Primary School, Kindergarten and College, Sarvaš
- Slovak Bilingual Primary School and Kindergarten, Slovenský Komlóš
- General school with Slovak as the language of instruction, Nové Mesto pod Šiatrom
- Slovak grammar school, primary school, kindergarten and college, Békešská Čaba
- Kindergarten, primary school, grammar school and college with Slovak as the language of instruction, Budapest

== Politics ==
=== 2020 Slovak parliamentary election ===
Region	OĽaNO–NOVA–KÚ–ZZ	Smer	We Are Family	ĽSNS	PS–Together	SaS	For the People	KDH	MKÖ/MKS	SNS	Good Choice	Homeland	Most–Híd	Other parties
Foreign	14.11	2.37	1.46	4.52	33.30	8.75	27.11	2.82	0.81	0.36	0.67	2.03	0.36	1.33
Slovakia Total	25.03	18.29	8.24	7.97	6.96	6.22	5.77	4.65	3.90	3.16	3.06	2.93	2.05	1.73

=== 2023 Slovak parliamentary election ===
Region	Smer–SD	PS	Hlas–SD	OĽaNO and Friends	KDH	SaS	SNS	Republic	Alliance	Democrats	We Are Family	People's Party Our Slovakia	KSS	Other parties
Foreign	6.10	61.70	2.46	3.81	3.31	10.80	3.79	3.20	0.47	2.50	0.55	0.38	0.04	0.76
Slovakia Total	22.94	17.96	14.70	8.89	6.82	6.32	5.62	4.75	4.38	2.93	2.21	0.84	0.33	1.16

== Famous people of Slovak descent ==
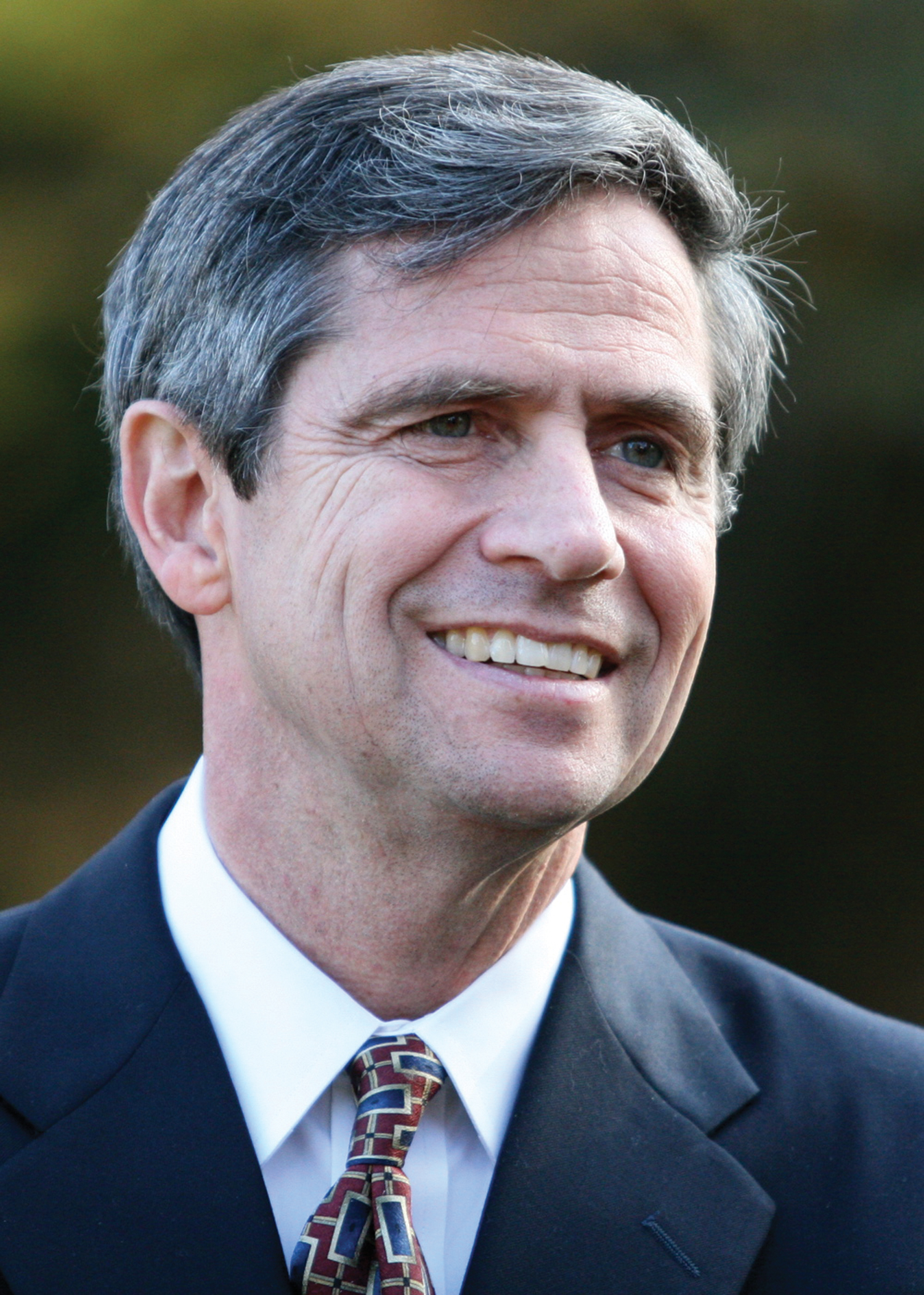
Joe Sestak, a former U.S. Navy three-star Admiral and former American politician

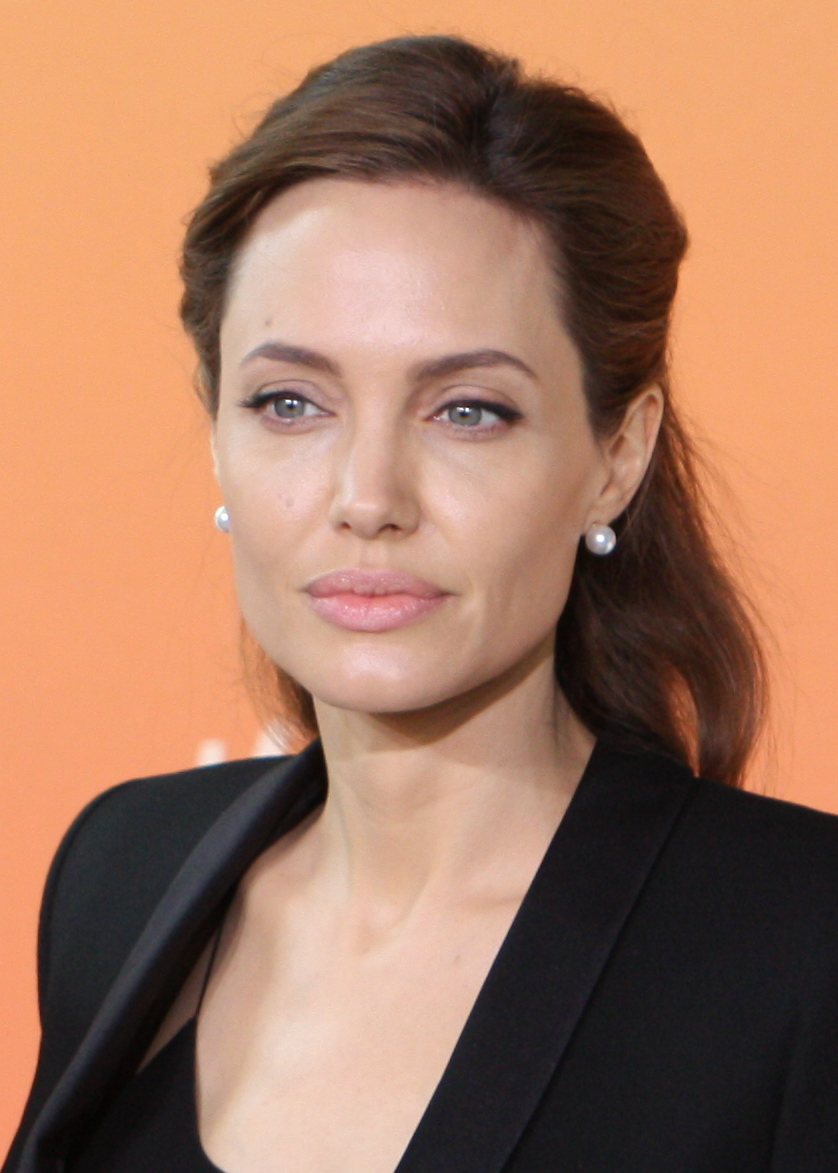
Angelina Jolie, an American actress

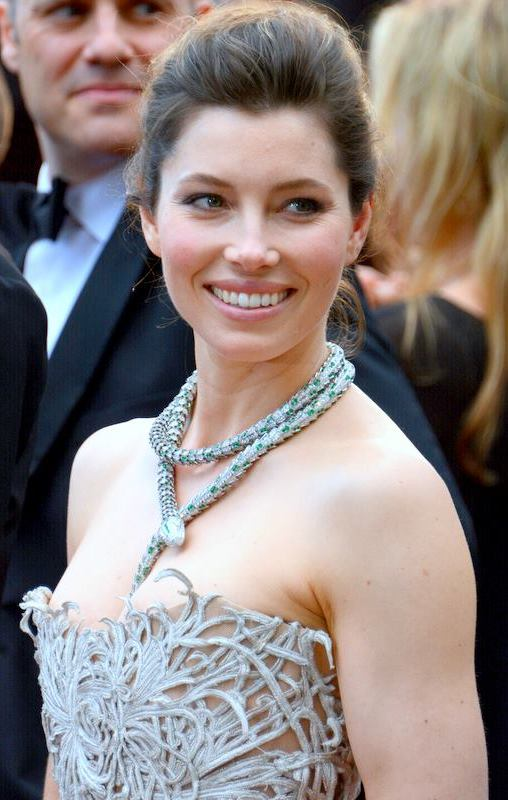
Jessica Biel's ancestors were from Žilina

- Jon Voight, an American actor, father Ján Vojtka from Košice
- Eugene Cernan, a United States Navy officer and NASA astronaut and the last astronaut on the Moon. His father was Slovak, his mother was Czech. He kept visiting Slovakia until he was 70 years old.
- Renée Geyer, an Australian singer who has long been regarded as one of the finest exponents of jazz, soul and R&B idioms.
- Lukáš Hrádecký, a Slovak-born Finnish football goalkeeper.
- Tim Hudak, a politician in Ontario, Canada, and the Leader of the Progressive Conservative Party of Ontario (PC Party).
- Angelina Jolie, an American actress and film director. Grandfather Ján Vojtka (John Voight) was from Košice.
- Jon Bon Jovi, an American musician, singer, songwriter, record producer and actor. Grandmother Slovak. He's also Sicilian, German, Russian
- Jim Caviezel, an American actor. His grandmother, named Helena, was Slovak
- Mike Cervenak, an American baseball player.
- Ricardo de Jaxa Malachowski, a Peruvian architect of Polish and Slovak origin.
- Stan Mikita, a Slovak-born Canadian retired professional ice hockey player. Originally named Stanislav Guoth, born in Sokolče, Banská Bystrica
- Paul Newman, an American actor, film director, entrepreneur, humanitarian, and professional racing driver. His mother Terézia Fecková born in Pitičie, Humenné.
- Andrew Poje, a Canadian ice dancer.
- Ivan Reitman, Slovak-Jewish-Canadian film director and film producer, his parents Klára and Ladislav from Komárno.
- Jason Reitman, film director
- Joe Sestak, a former U.S. Navy three-star Admiral and former American politician.
- Jesse Ventura, an American politician, actor, author, veteran, and former professional wrestler.
- Tony Curtis, actor, mother came from Vaľkovo, Poltár.
- Pola Negri, first female-European Hollywood star, birthname Barbara Apolónia Chalupcová, born in Poland to a Polish mother and Slovak father from Kysuce
- Steve Ihnat, actor, birthname Štefan Ihnát, parents from Michalovce district
- Jessica Biel, Slovak-Jewish-American actress, Moritz Biel emigrated from Porúbka, Žilina
- Dave Grohl, rock musician, his ancestry is Slovak, Irish and German
- Steve Ditko, Marvel author and artist, both parents Slovak-Americans.
- Justin Jedlica, known as human Ken doll. Both parents are from Bratislava
- Michael Fincke, American astronaut, holder of a record for most time spent in Space.
- Chuck Bednarik, professional American football player, studied at Slovak school in Pennsylvania, parents were from Široké
- Lizabeth Scott, birthname Ema Macová, both parents Slovaks who emigrated to the USA.
- Peter Lorre, actor, birthname Ladislav Lowenstein, a Slovak-Jewish-American born in Ružomberok, present-day Slovakia, back in 1904 part of Austria-Hungary
- David Dobrik, YouTuber, born in Slovakia, as of 2021 still holder of the Slovak citizenship, born in Košice
- David Boreanaz, actor, his grandmother was Slovak
- Andy Warhol, modern artist, Slovak-Ruthenian ethnic, parents from Miková, Stropkov.
- Frank Lowy, businessman and philanthropist, Slovak-Jewish-Hungarian ethnic, born in Fiľakovo, Slovakia, back then part of Czechoslovakia,
- John Dopyera, birthname Ján Dopjera, inventor and entrepreneur funder of a musical instrument dobro. Born in Šaštín-Stráže
- Joseph Murgas, birthname Jozef Murgaš, a scientist and inventor born in Tajov, Banská Bystrica
- Maximilian Hell, a Slovak-German Jesuit priest and astronomer, born in Banská Štiavnica, Slovakia, back then part of the Hungarian Kingdom
- Joseph Goldberger, An American physician and epidemiologist of a Slovak-Jewish ancestry born in Giraltovce
- Josef Chaim Sonnenfeld, rabbi and co-founder of the Edah HaChareidis, a Haredi Jewish community in Jerusalem, born in Vrbové.
- Milan Misik, originally named Milan Mišík, a respected geologist and university professor, born in Skalica
- John D. Hertz, a Slovak-Jewish ethnic, businessman, racehorse owner and philanthropist founder of the Yellow Cab company, born in Martin
- Stefan Banic, originally named Štefan Banič, parachute inventor, born in Smolenice
- Michael Strank, US marine corps sergeant, killed in the battle of Iwo Jima, one of the flag raisers, helped to raise the 2nd flag on Mount Suribachi, born in Jarabina
- Peter Sagan, a Slovak professional bicycle racer, earned 3 world championships, born in Žilina
- Katarina Van Derham, an American model and actress, born in Ľubochňa
- Vladimir Furdik, actor and stunt performer, born in Bratislava
- Audrey Hepburn, British actress of Slovak-Dutch ancestry. Her grandparents were from Topoľčany district where they owned a sugar refinery
- Tom Selleck, American actor, his father was from eastern Slovakia
- Robert Urich, American actor and producer, maternal grandparents from Bardejov, eastern Slovakia and his father from western Slovakia
- Ivan A. Getting, physicist and engineer, born to Slovak and German immigrants in the US, his Slovak side is from Bytča
- Daniel Carleton Gajdusek, medical researcher and Nobel prize holder, an ethnic Slovak-Hungarian, father from Smrdáky
- Diana Krall, a Canadian jazz singer, her grandfather was named Kráľ (ENG: King) and he was from Žilina Region
- Joe Baksi, a professional heavy weight US box player, a child of Slovak immigrants from Krásna nad Hornádom, today known as Krásna - a city district of Košice
- Carolyn Forché, professor, editor, human rights activist, her ancestors came from the county of Tatry
- Michael Bednarik, a software engineer, US political figure, both of his parents were Slovaks.
- Travis Kalanick, the founder of Uber, his grandparents came from Valaškovce, Humenné
- Daddario siblings - Matthew, Alexandra, Catherine, their ancestors came from Krížová Nová Ves, today known as Krížová Ves, Kežmarok
- Austin Mahone, singer, songwriter who worked himself up from YouTube, his grandfather was a Slovak-Ruthenian (Eastern Slovakia area)
- Bianca Maria Kajlich, her father Ján Kajlich was born in Bratislava

== See also ==
- History of Slovakia
- List of Slovaks
- Category:People of Slovak descent
