= Derna =

Derna may refer to:

== Places ==
- Derna District, a district in eastern Libya
  - Derna, Libya, a port city in that district
  - Apostolic Vicariate of Derna, a Catholic pre-diocesan jurisdiction with see in that city
  - RAF Derna, a former Royal Air Force station located near Derna, Libya, during the Second World War
- Derna, Bihor, Romania, a commune
  - Derna mine
  - Derna oil field
- Derna (river), Romania
- Derna Province, a province of Libya established in 1937 under Italian rule

== People ==
- Derna Casetti (born 1959), Italian former female middle-distance and cross-country runner
- Derna Polazzo (1912–?), Italian sprinter and long jumper

== Other uses ==
- Battle of Derna (disambiguation)

== See also ==
- Darneh (disambiguation)
