= Varvizel =

- Location within Romania

Location
- Country: Romania
- Counties: Bihor County
- Villages: Socet, Vărzari, Varviz

Physical characteristics
- Mouth: Bistra
  - location: Popești
  - coordinates: 47.2354°N 22.4227°E
- Length: 13 km (8.1 mi)
- Basin size: 27 km^{2} (10 sq mi)

Basin features
- Progression: Bistra→ Barcău→ Crișul Repede→ Körös→ Tisza→ Danube→ Black Sea
- River code: III.1.44.33.15.2

The Varvizel is a right tributary of the river Bistra in Romania. It flows into the Bistra in Popești. Its length is 13 km (8.1 mi) and its basin size is 27 km^{2} (10 sq mi).
