= Almaș (Barcău) =

Tributary of the river Barcău in Romania

- Location within Romania

Location
- Country: Romania
- Counties: Bihor County
- Villages: Burzuc, Chioag, Sârbi, Fegernic, Cenaloș

Physical characteristics
- Mouth: Barcău
  - location: Cenaloș
  - coordinates: 47.2531°N 22.1340°E

Basin features
- Progression: Barcău→ Crișul Repede→ Körös→ Tisza→ Danube→ Black Sea
- Tributaries
  - right: Sarcău

The Almaș is a left tributary of the river Barcău in Romania. It discharges into the Barcău in Cenaloș.
