= Valea Fânețelor =

- Location within Romania

Location
- Country: Romania
- Counties: Bihor County
- Communes: Brusturi, Spinuș, Chișlaz

Physical characteristics
- Mouth: Barcău
  - location: Upstream of Sâniob
  - coordinates: 47.2595°N 22.1607°E
- Length: 30 km (19 mi)
- Basin size: 178 km^{2} (69 sq mi)

Basin features
- Progression: Barcău→ Crișul Repede→ Körös→ Tisza→ Danube→ Black Sea
- Tributaries
  - left: Orvișele
  - right: Loranta, Pârâul Lupului, Brusturi, Corbeni, Derna

The Valea Fânețelor (also: Valea Fânațelor or Ghepiș) is a left tributary of the river Barcău in Romania. It discharges into the Barcău near Cenaloș. It flows through the villages Cuieșd, Țigăneștii de Criș, Picleu, Brusturi, Păulești, Gurbești, Spinuș, Ciulești and Sărsig. Its length is 30 km (19 mi) and its basin size is 178 km^{2} (69 sq mi).
