= Drighiu =

- Location within Romania

Location
- Country: Romania
- Counties: Sălaj County
- Villages: Halmășd, Drighiu

Physical characteristics
- Mouth: Valea Mare
  - coordinates: 47.1689°N 22.7081°E
- Length: 16 km (9.9 mi)
- Basin size: 41 km^{2} (16 sq mi)

Basin features
- Progression: Valea Mare→ Barcău→ Crișul Repede→ Körös→ Tisza→ Danube→ Black Sea
- Tributaries
  - right: Turea
- River code: III.1.44.33.4.2

The Drighiu is a left tributary of the river Valea Mare in Romania. It flows into the Valea Mare near Bozieș. Its length is 16 km (9.9 mi) and its basin size is 41 km^{2} (16 sq mi).
