= Szóvárhegy =

Szóvárhegy is the Hungarian name for two villages in Romania:

- Picleu village, Brusturi Commune, Bihor County
- Almașu Mic village, Sârbi Commune, Bihor County
