= Corbeni (river) =

- Location within Romania

Location
- Country: Romania
- Counties: Bihor County
- Villages: Sacalasău Nou, Sacalasău, Săliște

Physical characteristics
- Mouth: Valea Fânețelor
  - location: Săliște
  - coordinates: 47.1841°N 22.2197°E
- Length: 14 km (8.7 mi)
- Basin size: 22 km^{2} (8.5 sq mi)

Basin features
- Progression: Valea Fânețelor→ Barcău→ Crișul Repede→ Körös→ Tisza→ Danube→ Black Sea

The Corbeni (also: Sacalasău) is a right tributary of the river Valea Fânețelor in Romania. It flows into the Valea Fânețelor near Săliște. Its length is 14 km (8.7 mi) and its basin size is 22 km^{2} (8.5 sq mi).
