= Valea Mare (Barcău) =

- Location within Romania

Location
- Country: Romania
- Counties: Sălaj County
- Villages: Plopiș, Bozieș

Physical characteristics
- Mouth: Barcău
  - location: Boghiș
  - coordinates: 47.1733°N 22.7117°E
- Length: 25 km (16 mi)
- Basin size: 113 km^{2} (44 sq mi)

Basin features
- Progression: Barcău→ Crișul Repede→ Körös→ Tisza→ Danube→ Black Sea
- Tributaries
  - left: Drighiu
  - right: Lucșoara

The Valea Mare is a left tributary of the river Barcău in Romania. It discharges into the Barcău near Boghiș. Its length is 25 km (16 mi) and its basin size is 113 km^{2} (44 sq mi).
