= Spinus =

Spinus may refer to:

- Spinus (bird), a genus of birds in the finch family (Fringillidae)
- Spinuș, a commune in Bihor County, Romania
