= Bistra (Barcău) =

- Location within Romania

Location
- Country: Romania
- Counties: Bihor County
- Communes: Șinteu, Popești, Tăuteu

Physical characteristics
- Mouth: Barcău
  - location: Marghita
  - coordinates: 47.3265°N 22.3187°E

Basin features
- Progression: Barcău→ Crișul Repede→ Körös→ Tisza→ Danube→ Black Sea
- Tributaries
  - left: Rovine
  - right: Cuzap, Varvizel

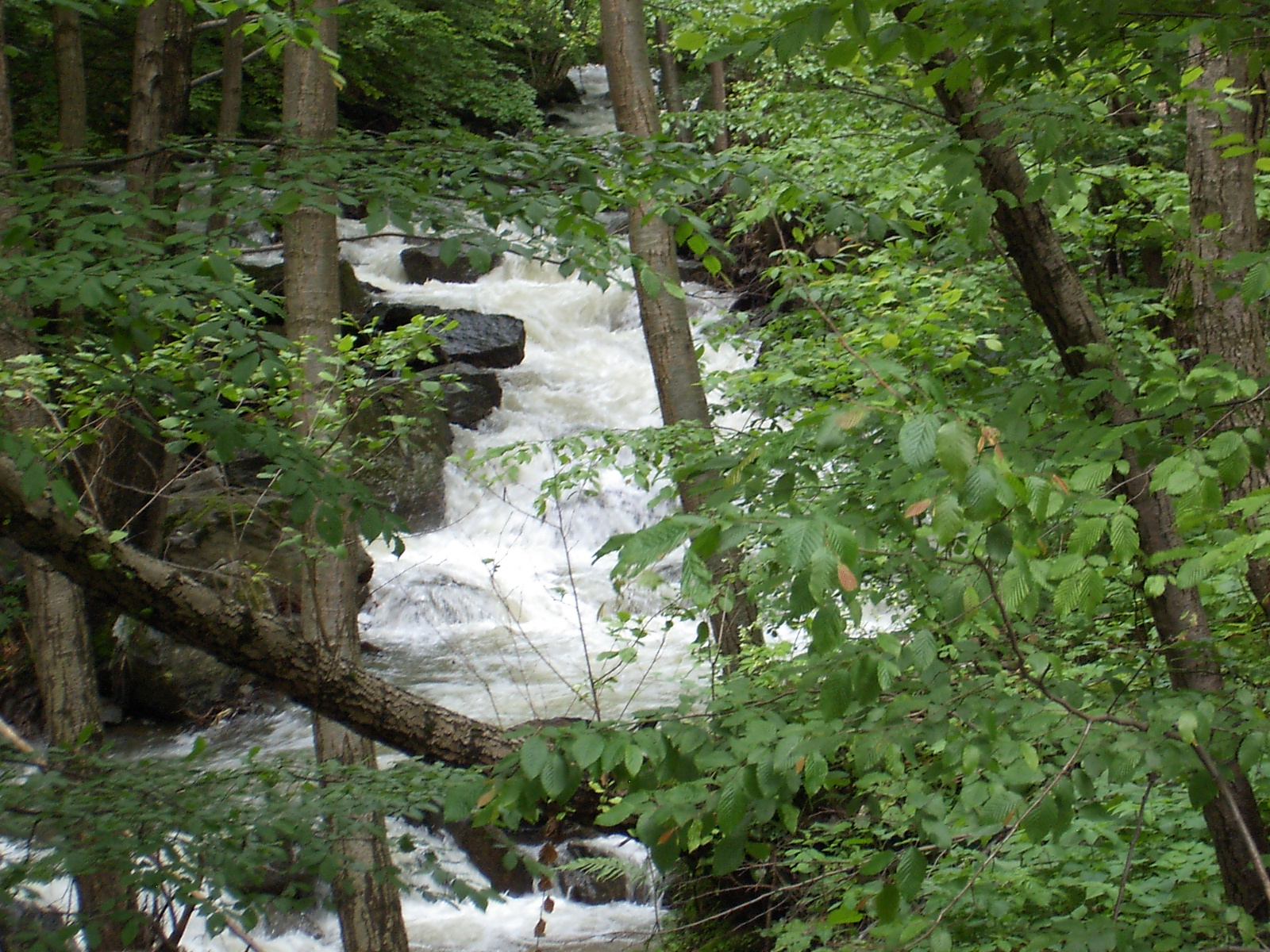

The Bistra is a left tributary of the river Barcău in Romania. It discharges into the Barcău near Marghita. It flows through the villages Șinteu, Voivozi, Popești, Bistra, Ciutelec, Bogei, Tăuteu, Poiana and Chiribiș. Its length is 47 km (29 mi) and its basin size is 175 km^{2} (68 sq mi).
