= Socet =

Socet may refer to:

- Socet, a village in Șinteu Commune, Bihor County, Romania
- Socet, a village in Cerbăl Commune, Hunedoara County, Romania
