= Loranta =

Loranta may refer to:

- Loranta, a village in Brusturi Commune, Bihor County, Romania
- Losartan, a drug used mainly to treat high blood pressure (hypertension)
