= Bozieș =

Bozieş may refer to several villages in Romania:

- Bozieş, a village in Chiochiș Commune, Bistriţa-Năsăud County
- Bozieş, a village in Boghiş Commune, Sălaj County
