= Iazuri River =

Iazuri River may refer to:

- Iazuri, a tributary of the Șomuzul Mare in Suceava County
- Iazuri or Iazurile, a tributary of the Dobra in Hunedoara County

== See also ==
- Iaz River (disambiguation)
