= Iaz =

Iaz or IAZ may refer to several places in Romania:

- Iaz, a village in Strugari Commune, Bacău County
- Iaz, a village in Obreja Commune, Caraș-Severin County
- Iaz, a village in Plopiș Commune, Sălaj County
- Iaz, a village in Dornești Commune, Suceava County
- Iaz, a village in Solești Commune, Vaslui County
- Iaz (Barcău), a tributary of the Barcău in Sălaj County
- Iaz, another name for the river Mândra in Brașov County
- Iaz, a tributary of the Șușița in Gorj County
