= Iaz (Barcău) =

- Location within Romania

Location
- Country: Romania
- Counties: Sălaj County
- Villages: Iaz, Boghiș

Physical characteristics
- Mouth: Barcău
  - location: Boghiș
  - coordinates: 47.1546°N 22.7346°E
- Length: 16 km (9.9 mi)
- Basin size: 38 km^{2} (15 sq mi)

Basin features
- Progression: Barcău→ Crișul Repede→ Körös→ Tisza→ Danube→ Black Sea
- Tributaries
  - right: Valea Șesii

The Iaz is a left tributary of the river Barcău in Romania. It discharges into the Barcău in Boghiș. Its length is 16 km (9.9 mi) and its basin size is 38 km^{2} (15 sq mi).
