= Lucșoara =

- Location within Romania

Location
- Country: Romania
- Counties: Sălaj County
- Villages: Plopiș

Physical characteristics
- Mouth: Valea Mare
  - location: Plopiș
  - coordinates: 47.1326°N 22.6708°E
- Length: 13 km (8.1 mi)
- Basin size: 24 km^{2} (9.3 sq mi)

Basin features
- Progression: Valea Mare→ Barcău→ Crișul Repede→ Körös→ Tisza→ Danube→ Black Sea

The Lucșoara is a right tributary of the river Valea Mare in Romania. It flows into the Valea Mare in Plopiș. Its length is 13 km (8.1 mi) and its basin size is 24 km^{2} (9.3 sq mi).
