= Derna oil field =

Romanian shale oil field

Derna
- Country: Romania
- Region: Bihor County
- Offshore/onshore: onshore

Production
- Estimated oil in place: 4.5 million tonnes (~ 5.33×10^{6} m^{3} or 33.5 million bbl)

The Derna oil field is a shale oil field located in Derna, Bihor County. It was discovered in 1900 but remained undeveloped. The total proven reserves of the Derna oil field are around 33.5 million barrels (4.5 million tonnes), and production if started would be centered on 500 barrels per day (79 m^{3}/d).
