= Derna mine =

Oil shale mine in Romania

Derna Mine
- Location: Derna, Bihor County, Romania
- Products: Oil shale

The Derna Mine is an oil shale mine located in Derna, Bihor County. The mine has oil shale reserves amounting to 75 million tonnes, one of the largest oil shale reserves in Romania and Europe and has an organic content equivalent to 4.5 million tonnes of oil.
