= Darneh =

Darneh (Persian: درنه) may refer to:

- Darnah Governorate, a former Governorate in Libya
- Doraneh, also spelled Darneh, a village in Iran
- Darneh, Kermanshah, a village in Iran

== See also ==
- Derna (disambiguation)
