= Ödön Rádl =

Hungarian writer and lawyer

Ödön Rádl (March 30, 1856 – December 20, 1916) was a Hungarian writer and lawyer.

He was born in Alsólugos (today Lugașu de Jos, Romania). He studied laws in Nagyvárad (today Oradea, Romania). He was a close friend of Kálmán and István Tisza. He wrote for several publications (Nagyváradi Lapok, Tiszavidék) and was a member of the Liberal Party and the Petőfi Society. Endre Ady criticized his conservatism.

== Works ==
- Levelek egy német faluból (1870)
- Szomorú történetek (1871)
- Jean Paul (1872)
- Egy tél Olaszhonban (1872)
