= Varat Eyalet =

Administrative division of the Ottoman Empire from 1660 to 1692

Varat Eyalet Eyalet-i Varat Pașalâcul de la Oradea Váradi vilajet
- Eyalet of the Ottoman Empire
- 1660–1692
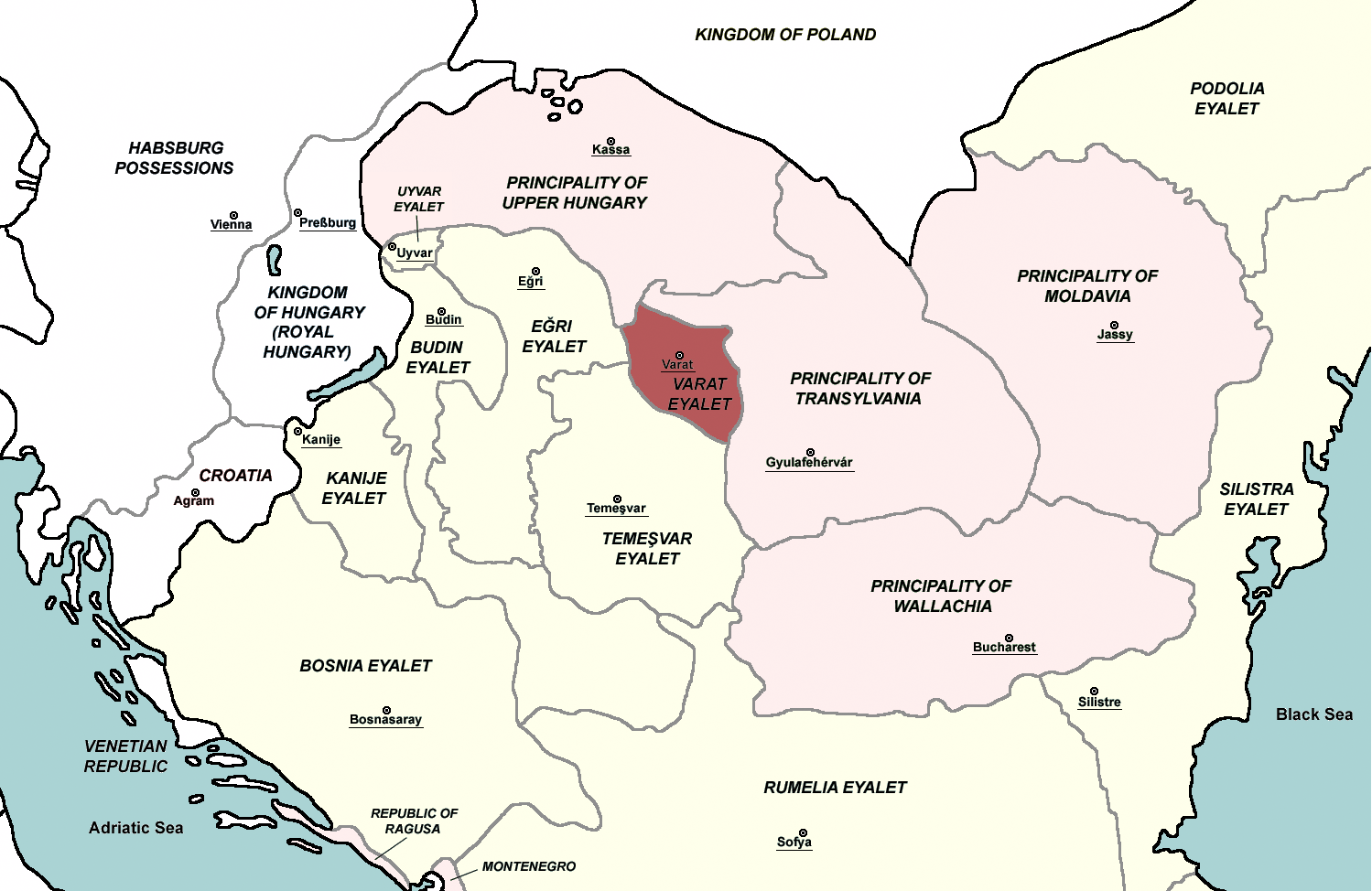
- The Varat Eyalet in 1683
- Capital: Varat
- Area
  - Coordinates: 47°4′N 21°55′E
- History
  - Established: 1660
  - Disestablished: 1692
Preceded by
Ottoman Principality of Transylvania
Temeşvar Eyalet
Egir Eyalet
Succeeded by
Habsburg Monarchy
- Today part of: Romania, Hungary

Varat Eyalet (also known as Pashaluk of Varat or Province of Varat; Ottoman Turkish: ایالت وارد; Eyālet-i Vārad) was an administrative territorial entity of the Ottoman Empire formed in 1660. Varat Eyalet bordered Ottoman Budin Eyalet in the west, Temeşvar Eyalet in the southwest, Egir Eyalet in the northwest, vassal Ottoman Principality of Transylvania in the southeast, and Habsburg Royal Hungary in the north.

== History ==
Varat (now Oradea) was made the seat of an Ottoman governor (Beylerbey) in 1660. Before the formation of the Eyalet, the land was mostly part of the Ottoman vassal Principality of Transylvania which established by the Treaty of Speyer in 1570 as the predecessor state of the Eastern Hungarian Kingdom. Some territories that formerly belonged to Temeşvar Eyalet and Egir Eyalet were also included into Varat Eyalet.

In June 1692, the territory was conquered by the Habsburg armies, and was formally annexed to the Habsburg Empire under the Treaty of Karlowitz in 1699. The territory of the former Ottoman eyalet was therefore included into the Habsburg-ruled Kingdom of Hungary and Principality of Transylvania.

== Administrative divisions ==
The sanjaks of Varat Eyalet in the 17th century:

1. Sanjak of Varat (Oradea)
2. Sanjak of Salanta (Salonta)
3. Sanjak of Debreçin (Debrecen)
4. Sanjak of Halmaş (Nagyhalász)
5. Sanjak of Şenköy (Sâniob)

== See also ==
- Subdivisions of the Ottoman Empire
