= Derna (river) =

- Location within Romania

Location
- Country: Romania
- Counties: Bihor County
- Villages: Derna, Dernișoara, Hăucești, Sărsig

Physical characteristics
- Mouth: Valea Fânețelor
  - location: Sărsig
  - coordinates: 47.2286°N 22.1889°E
- Length: 13 km (8.1 mi)

Basin features
- Progression: Valea Fânețelor→ Barcău→ Crișul Repede→ Körös→ Tisza→ Danube→ Black Sea

The Derna is a right tributary of the river Valea Fânețelor in Romania. It flows into the Valea Fânețelor in Sărsig. Its length is 13 km (8.1 mi).
