= Nădlac =

Nădlac Nadlak
- Town
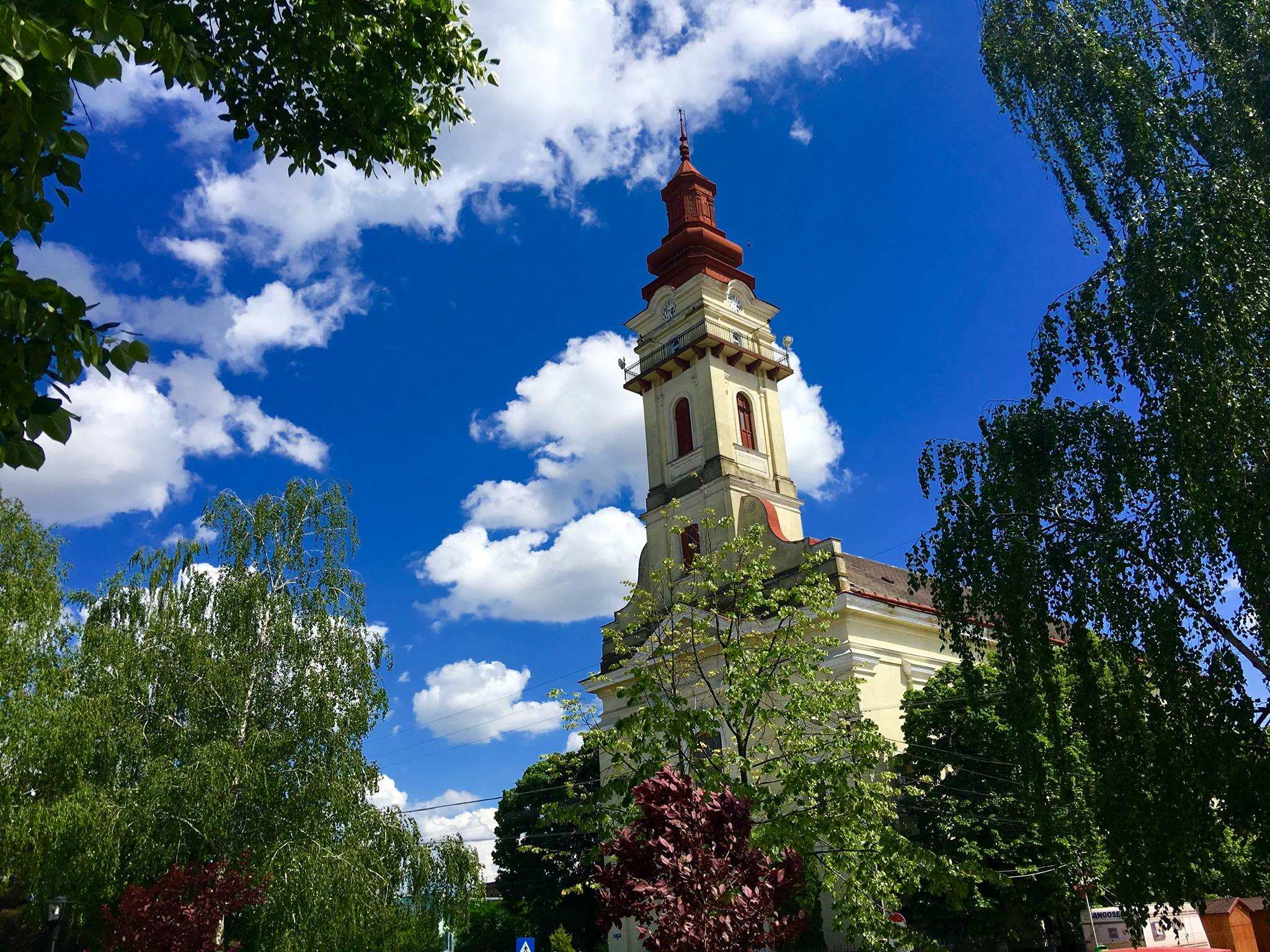
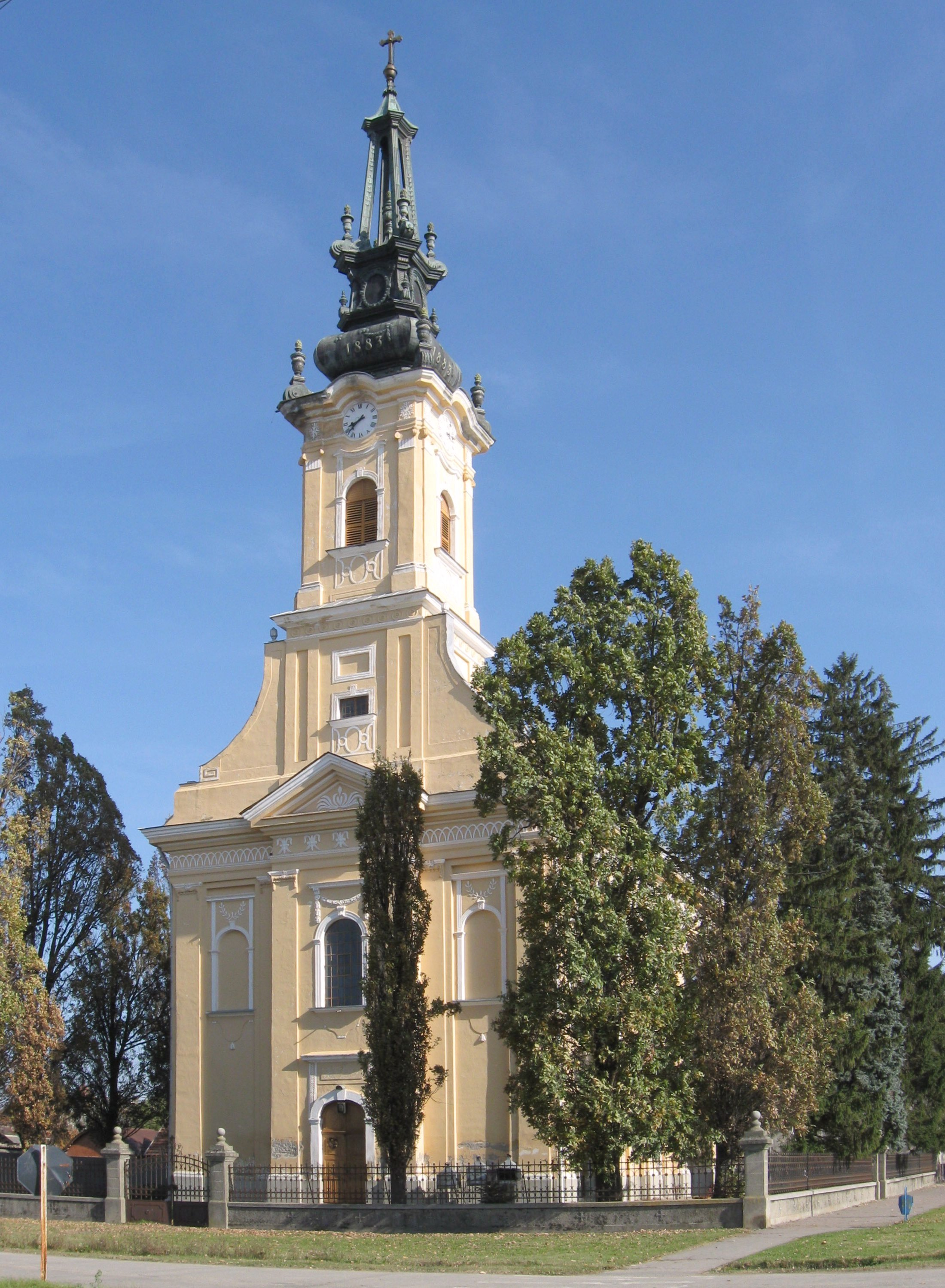
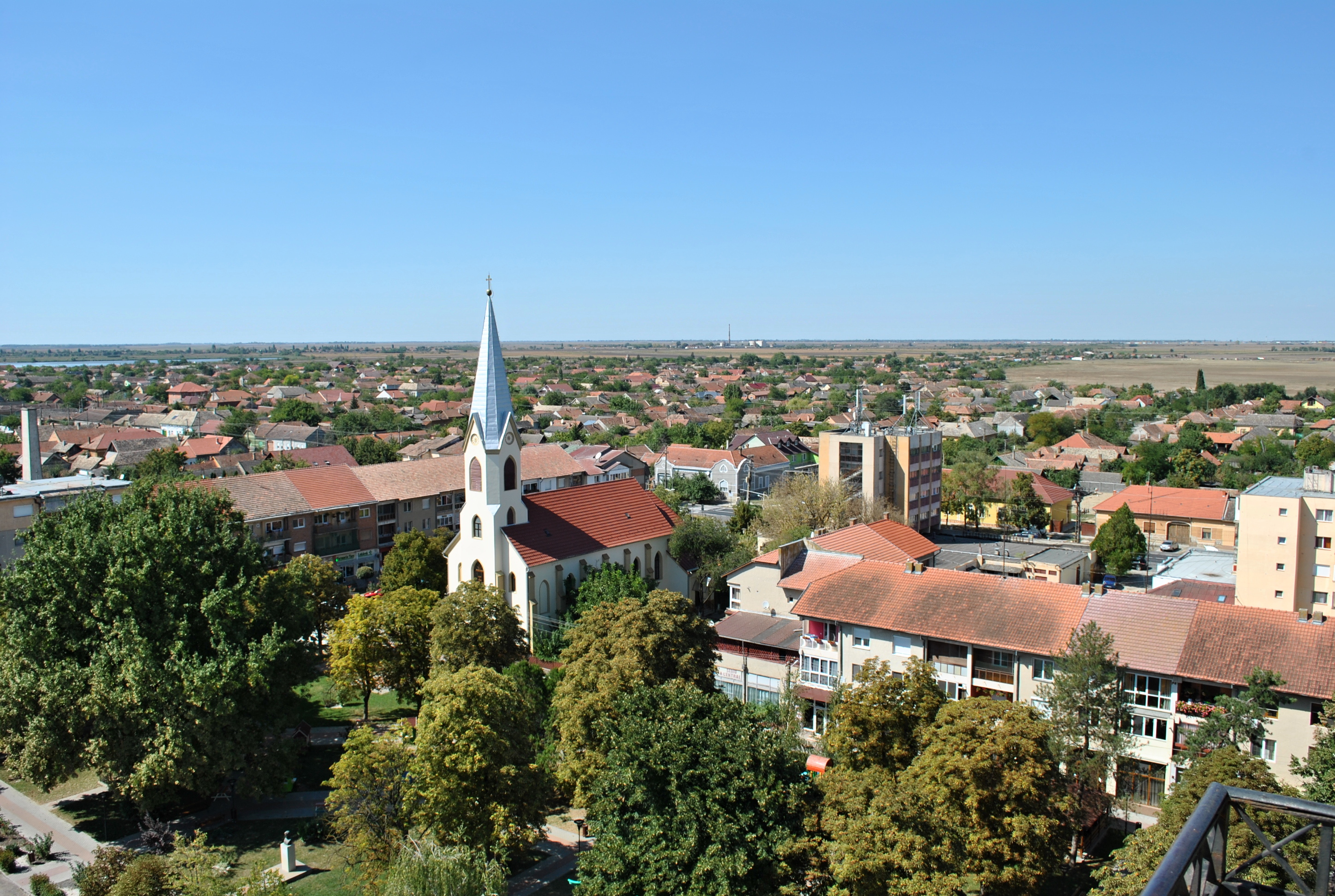
- Evangelical Church of Nădlac Orthodox Church of Nădlac View of Nădlac from the church tower

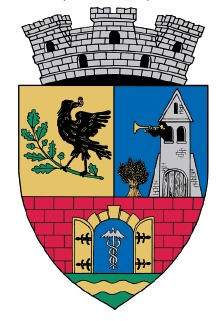
- Coat of arms

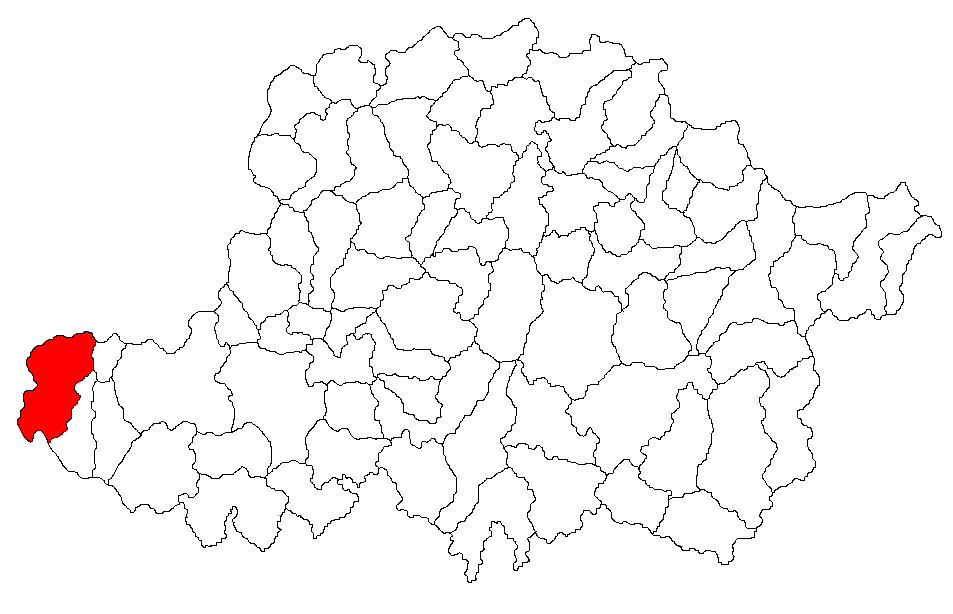
- Location in Arad County

- Location in Romania
- Coordinates: 46°10′0″N 20°45′2″E
- Country: Romania
- County: Arad

Government
  - Mayor (2024–2028): Mircea-Laurențiu Onea (PNL)
- Area: 133.15 km^{2} (51.41 sq mi)
- Elevation: 93 m (305 ft)
- Population (2021-12-01): 6,713
  - Density: 50.42/km^{2} (130.6/sq mi)
- Time zone: UTC+02:00 (EET)
  - Summer (DST): UTC+03:00 (EEST)
- Postal code: 315500
- Area code: (+40) 02 57
- Vehicle reg.: AR
- Website: primaria-nadlac.ro

Nădlac (Romanian pronunciation: [nədˈlak]; Slovak: Nadlak; Hungarian: Nagylak) is a town in Arad County, western Romania. A former part of the town lies across the border with Hungary; this village is called Nagylak. An international border town, Nădlac is the main border crossing into western Romania from Hungary. It is also a centre of the Lutheran Slovak community in Romania. Situated in the western part of Arad County, 50 km (31 mi) from the county capital, at the western border of Romania, Nădlac is the main entrance gate from Western Europe.

== Etymology ==
The settlement was first mentioned in historical documents in 1313, under the name Noglog. The Hungarian name Nagylak is a compound word formed from nagy, meaning "large" or "great", and lak, meaning "dwelling" or "habitat". The latter is related to the Hungarian verb lakni, meaning "to dwell" or "to reside". The name therefore conveys the meaning of a "large dwelling place" or "large habitat". The Romanian (Nădlac) and Slovak (Nadlak) versions are phonetic adaptations of the Hungarian original.

== Population ==
Historical population
Year	Pop.	±%
1880	10,646	—
1920	13,988	+31.4%
1977	8,405	−39.9%
1992	8,458	+0.6%
2002	8,422	−0.4%
2011	7,398	−12.2%
2021	6,713	−9.3%
Source: Census data

At the 2021 census, Nădlac had a population of 6,713. At the 2011 census, the town had 7,398 inhabitants; of those, 47.26% were Romanians, 43.85% Slovaks, 5.1% Romani, 2.37% Hungarians, and 1.75% other or undeclared nationalities.

== History ==
Archaeological excavations have brought to the surface traces of existence of the Dacian-Romans. During medieval times, Nădlac, a castle with wooden and soil fortification, was invaded by the Mongols, was held by János Hunyadi, and was donated to the commanding officers György István and Dmitar Jakšić who laid the foundation of a new fortification. It was also ravaged several times by the Ottoman Turks, and was razed to the ground by the rebels led by György Dózsa. It was, however, rebuilt every time. In 1685 the town was conquered by the Austrian royal army and was integrated in the border disposition of the Mureș valley.

One of the most important moments in the history of Nădlac took place in the early 19th century, when the colonization process of the Slovaks started. This nationality has contributed to a great extent to the development of the settlement.

== Tourist attractions ==
Among the town's tourist sights are the Saint Nicholas Church and the Slovak Lutheran church. There is also a park called "Lunca Mureșului."
