= Battle of Derna =

Battle of Derna may refer to:

- Battle of Derna (1805), a battle during the Tripolitan War
- Battle of Derna (1912), a battle during the Italo-Turkish War
- Battle of Derna (1941), a battle between Commonwealth and Italian forces during World War II
- Derna campaign (2014–2016), a battle during the Second Libyan Civil War
- Siege of Derna (2016–2019), a siege during the Second Libyan Civil War
  - Battle of Derna (2018–2019), a battle during the Second Libyan Civil War
