= Halmășd =

- Commune
- Halmășd village

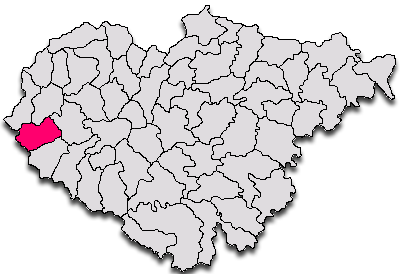
- Location in Sălaj County

- Location in Romania
- Coordinates: 47°09′17″N 22°34′44″E
- Country: Romania
- County: Sălaj

Government
  - Mayor (2020–2024): Gavril Pușcaș (PSD)
- Area: 57.79 km^{2} (22.31 sq mi)
- Elevation: 316 m (1,037 ft)
- Population (2021-12-01): 2,107
  - Density: 36.46/km^{2} (94.43/sq mi)
- Time zone: UTC+02:00 (EET)
  - Summer (DST): UTC+03:00 (EEST)
- Postal code: 457160
- Area code: +(40) 0260
- Vehicle reg.: SJ
- Website: primariahalmasd.ro

Halmășd (Hungarian: Halmosd, Slovak: Halmožď) is a commune located in Sălaj County, Crișana, Romania. It is composed of five villages: Aleuș (Elyüs), Cerișa (Szilágycseres), Drighiu (Detrehem), Fufez (Tufertelep), and Halmășd.
