= Brusturi, Bihor =

Brusturi
- Commune
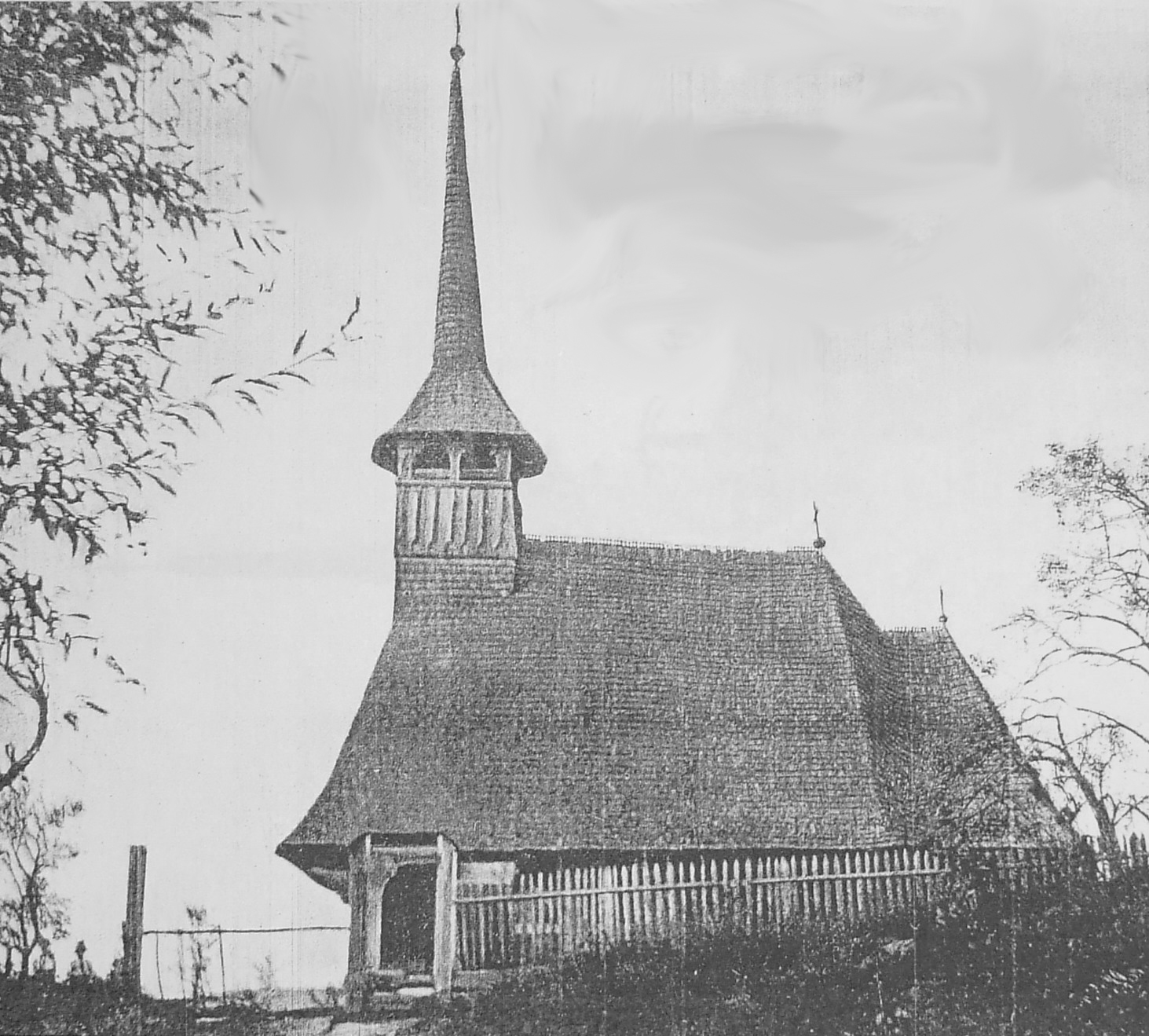
- Old wooden church from Picleu village (c.1931)

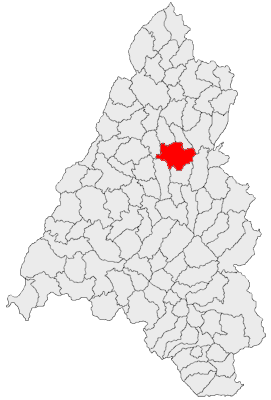
- Location in Bihor County

- Location in Romania
- Coordinates: 47°10′N 22°14′E
- Country: Romania
- County: Bihor

Government
  - Mayor (2024–2028): Livia-Daniela Bârlâu (PSD)
- Area: 103 km^{2} (40 sq mi)
- Elevation: 150 m (490 ft)
- Population (2021-12-01): 3,037
  - Density: 29.5/km^{2} (76.4/sq mi)
- Time zone: UTC+02:00 (EET)
  - Summer (DST): UTC+03:00 (EEST)
- Postal code: 417090
- Area code: +40 x59
- Vehicle reg.: BH
- Website: primariabrusturi.ro

Brusturi (Hungarian: Tataros, German: Brestur) is a commune in Bihor County, Crișana, Romania. It is composed of eight villages: Brusturi, Cuieșd (Kövesd), Loranta (Loránta), Orvișele (Orvisel), Păulești (Felsőtótfalu), Picleu (Szóvárhegy), Țigăneștii de Criș (Cigányfalva), and Varasău (Varaszótanya).

The commune lies on the banks of the river Valea Fânețelor. It is located in the north-central part of the county, 38 km (24 mi) east of the county seat, Oradea. Brusturi is crossed by national road DN1P, which connects DN1 (starting from Uileacu de Criș) to DN19E (ending in Cenaloș).

In 1978, two miners (Ioan Bumb and Petru Lele) discovered dinosaur bones in a bauxite mine at Brusturi (Cornet). The Berriasian bauxite deposits at Cornet have yielded approximately 10,000 bones and bone fragments, mainly from ornithopod dinosaurs and rarer pterosaurs (see: Dinosaurs of Romania).

== Demographics ==
At the 2021 census, the commune had a population of 3,037; of those, 83.11% were Romanians, 3.49% Slovaks, 3.03% Roma, and 1.12% Hungarians.

== Natives ==
- Octavian Bot (1952–2015), politician
- Mihai Patriciu (1909–1997), Securitate colonel and communist politician
