= Lugașu de Jos =

- Commune
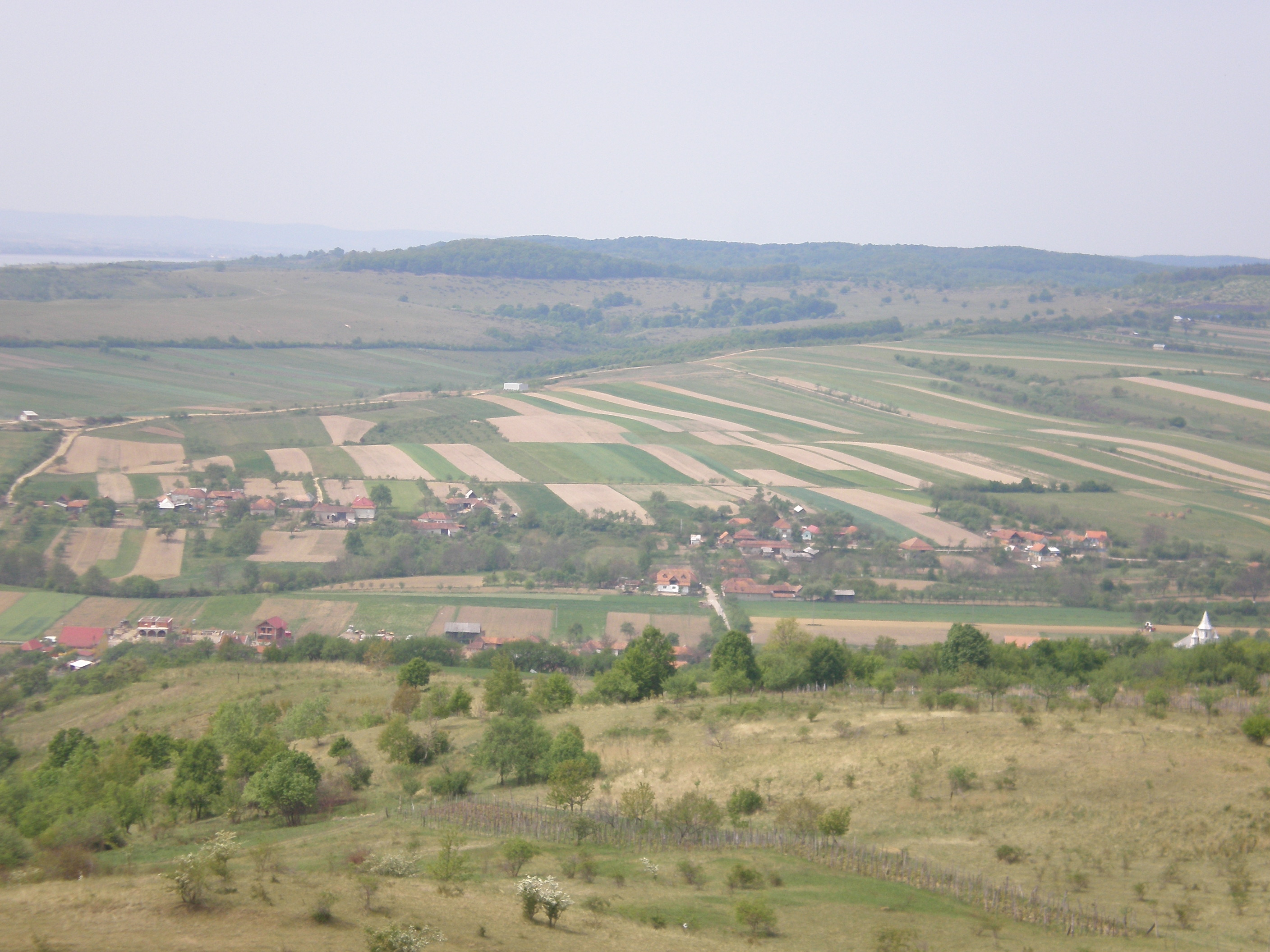
- Lugașu de Sus panorama

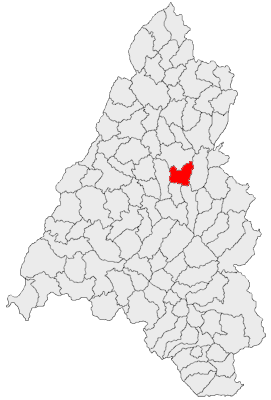
- Location in Bihor County

- Location in Romania
- Coordinates: 47°4′N 22°21′E
- Country: Romania
- County: Bihor
- Population (2021-12-01): 3,879
- Time zone: UTC+02:00 (EET)
  - Summer (DST): UTC+03:00 (EEST)
- Vehicle reg.: BH

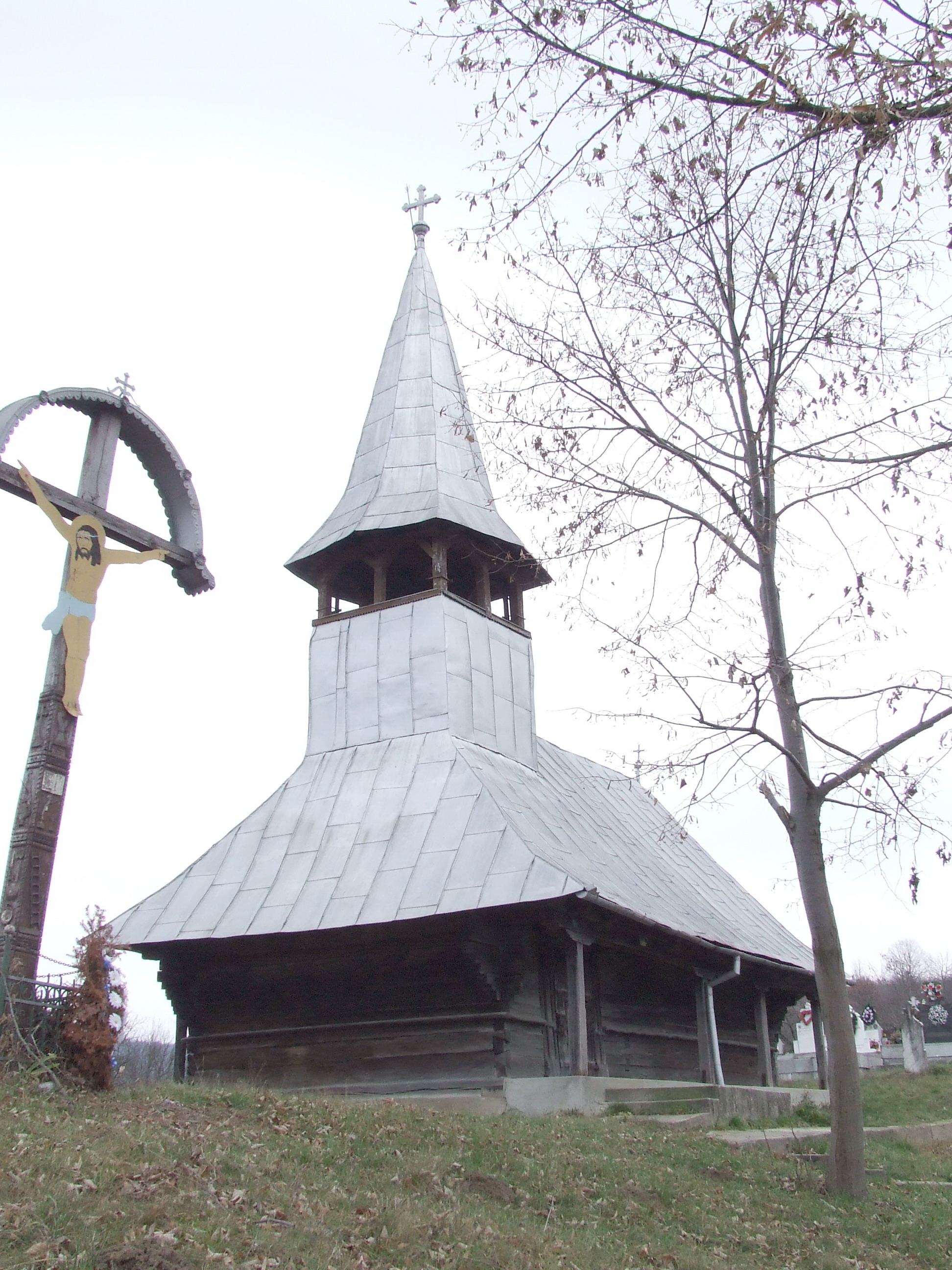
Lugașu de Sus wooden church

Lugașu de Jos (Hungarian: Alsólugos, Slovak: Lugaše) is a commune in Bihor County, Crișana, Romania with a population of 3,580 people. It is composed of three villages: Lugașu de Jos, Lugașu de Sus (Felsőlugos), and Urvind (Örvénd).

== Natives ==
- Ödön Rádl (1856–1916), Hungarian writer and lawyer
