= Sâniob =

Sâniob Szentjobb
- Commune
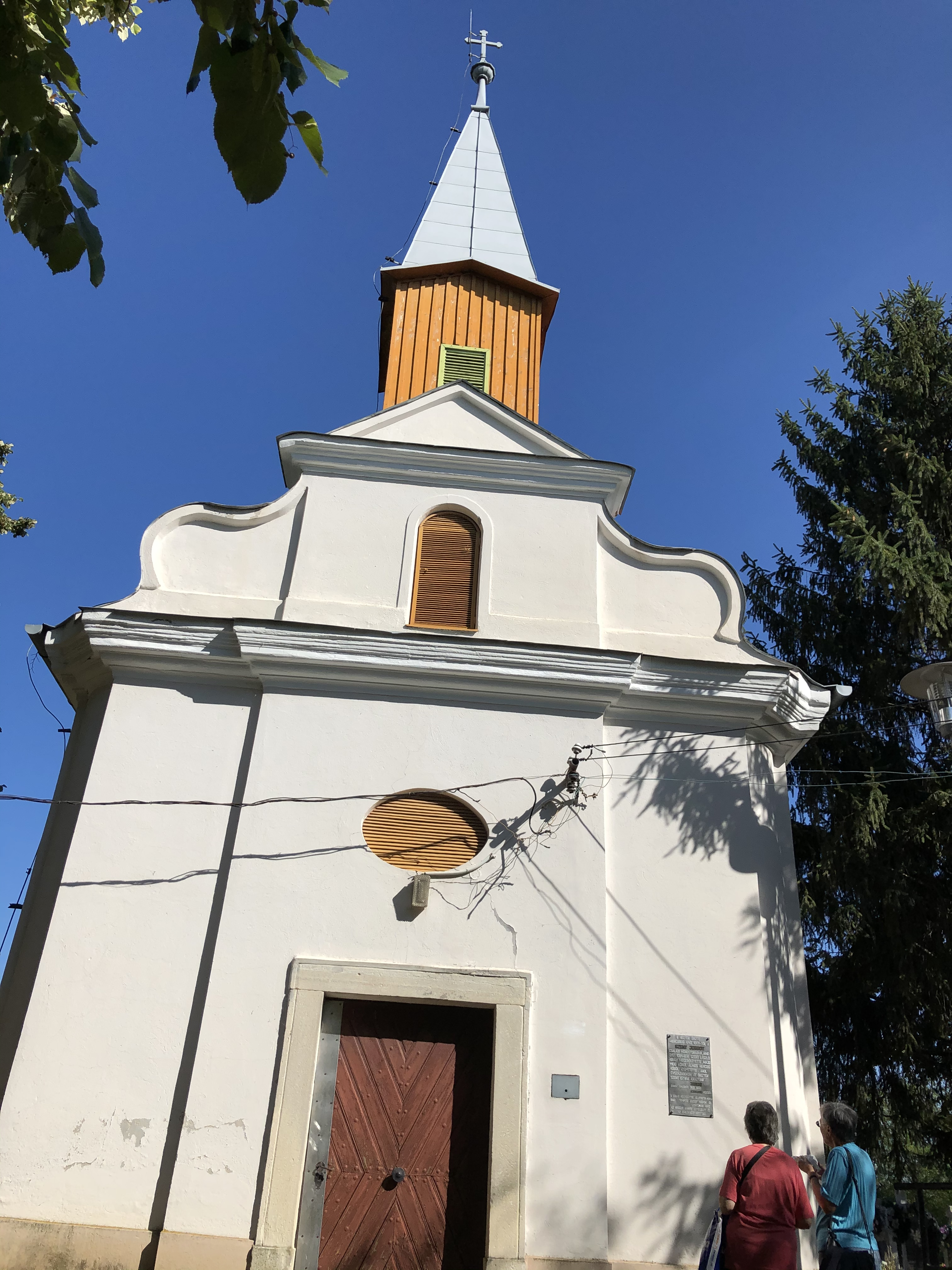
- Chapel in Sâniob

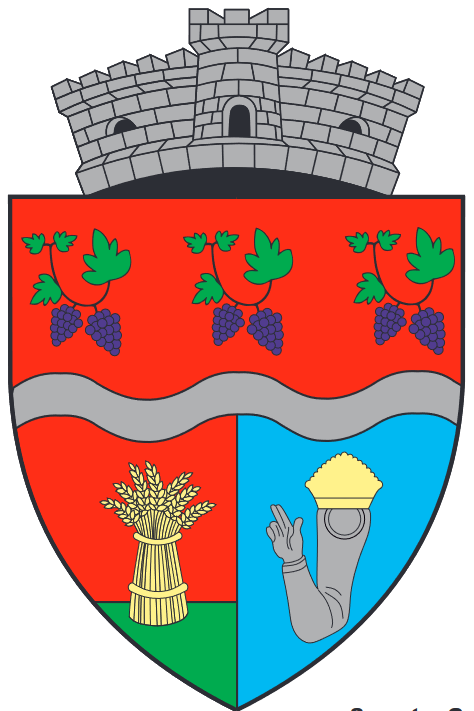
- Coat of arms

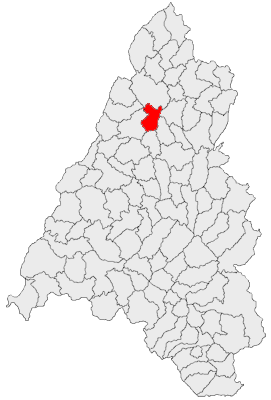
- Location in Bihor County

- Location in Romania
- Coordinates: 47°16′N 22°08′E
- Country: Romania
- County: Bihor

Government
  - Mayor (2020–2024): Jacint Zatyko (UDMR)
- Area: 58.31 km^{2} (22.51 sq mi)
- Elevation: 110 m (360 ft)
- Population (2021-12-01): 2,237
  - Density: 38.36/km^{2} (99.36/sq mi)
- Time zone: UTC+02:00 (EET)
  - Summer (DST): UTC+03:00 (EEST)
- Postal code: 417192
- Area code: (+40) 0259
- Vehicle reg.: BH
- Website: saniob.ro

Sâniob (Hungarian: Szentjobb) is a commune in Bihor County, Crișana, Romania. It is composed of four villages:

- Cenaloș (Csanálos), to the southeast of Sâniob
- Ciuhoi (Berettyócsohaj [ˈbɛrɛccoːt͡ʃohɒj]), to the south of Sâniob
- Sâniob
- Sfârnaș (Berettyófarnos), to the southwest of Sâniob

Known as Sâniob prior to 1968, the commune's name was changed to Ciuhoi that year and its seat moved to the latter village. In 2012, the commune's previous name was revived and the seat moved back to Sâniob village.

== History ==
The village was named after Stephen I of Hungary's Holy Dexter, whose preserved right hand was kept in an abbey here. The name was granted by Ladislaus I of Hungary in 1083. The locality was conquered by the Ottomans in 1661, becoming the seat of a sanjak in Varat Eyalet. Called Şenköy by the new authorities, it was captured by the Habsburg monarchy in 1691.

== Demographics ==
At the 2011 census, the commune had 2,333 inhabitants, of which 56.7% were Hungarians, 37.3% Romanians, and 5.6% Roma. In terms of religious affiliation, 46.1% were Roman Catholic, 29% Romanian Orthodox, 16.4% Reformed, 5.9% Pentecostal, and 0.9% Greek-Catholic. At the 2021 census, Sâniob had a population of 2,237; of those, 60.62% were Hungarians and 33.62% Romanians.
