= Popești, Bihor =

Popești
- Commune
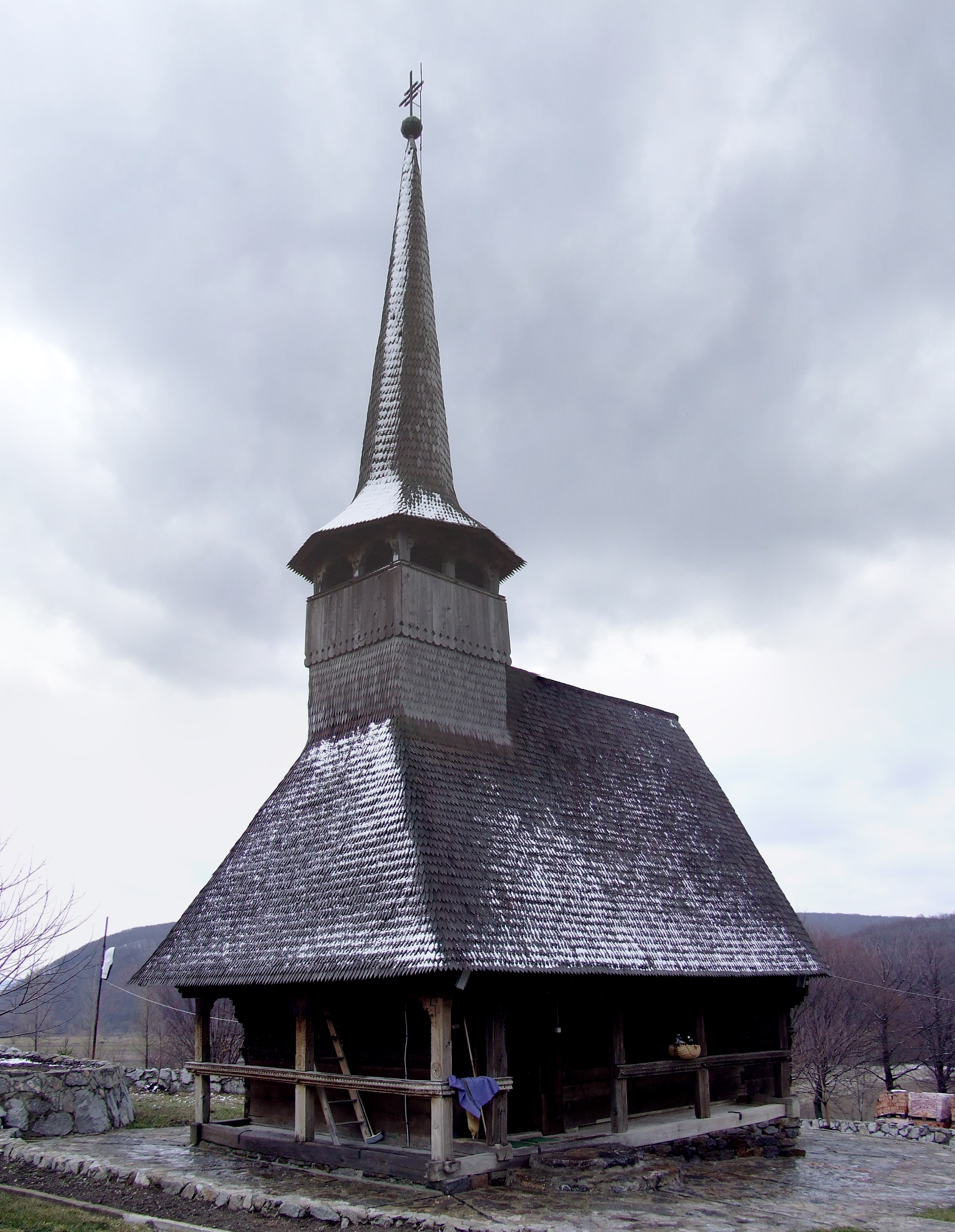
- Wooden church in Voivozi

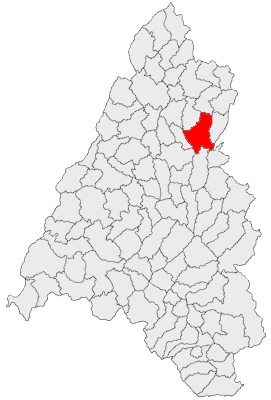
- Location in Bihor County

- Location in Romania
- Coordinates: 47°14′N 22°25′E
- Country: Romania
- County: Bihor

Government
  - Mayor (2020–2024): Dorin Curtean (PNL)
- Area: 108.76 km^{2} (41.99 sq mi)
- Population (2021-12-01): 6,427
  - Density: 59.09/km^{2} (153.1/sq mi)
- Time zone: UTC+02:00 (EET)
  - Summer (DST): UTC+03:00 (EEST)
- Postal code: 417390
- Area code: +40 x59
- Vehicle reg.: BH
- Website: comuna-popesti.ro

Popești (Hungarian: Papfalva, Slovak: Popešť) is a commune in Bihor County, Crișana, Romania. One of the largest communes in the county, it is composed of seven villages: Bistra (Sebesújfalu), Budoi (Bodonos), Cuzap (Középes), Popești, Varviz (Várvíz), Vărzari (Füves), and Voivozi (Almaszeg).

The commune is located in the northeastern part of Bihor County, 19 km (12 mi) south of Marghita, 33 km (21 mi) north of Aleșd, and 64 km (40 mi) from the county seat, Oradea. Popești lies in the hydrographic basin of the river Bistra, nestled between the northern branch of the Plopiș Mountains and the Derna foothills.
