= Spinuș =

- Commune
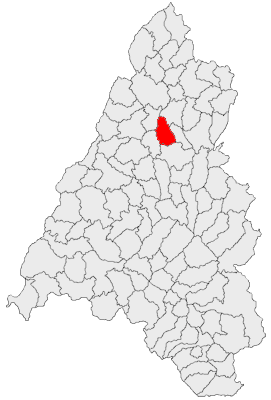
- Location in Bihor County

- Location in Romania
- Coordinates: 47.2°N 22.2°E
- Country: Romania
- County: Bihor

Government
  - Mayor (2020–2024): Alexandru Fonai (PNL)
- Area: 30.26 km^{2} (11.68 sq mi)
- Elevation: 143 m (469 ft)
- Population (2021-12-01): 1,166
  - Density: 39/km^{2} (100/sq mi)
- Time zone: EET/EEST (UTC+2/+3)
- Postal code: 417530
- Area code: +(40) 259
- Vehicle reg.: BH
- Website: primariaspinus.ro

Spinuș (Hungarian: Hagymádfalva) is one of the smallest communes in Bihor County, Crișana, Romania. It is composed of five villages: Ciulești (Csujafalva), Gurbești (Görbesd), Nădar (Nadántelek), Săliște (Kövesegyháza), and Spinuș.

It has a population 1,166 people (as of 2021). The Oradea–Brașov highway will pass through this commune in the near future. It is a wine-growing zone.
