= Șinteu =

Șinteu Nová Huta
- Commune
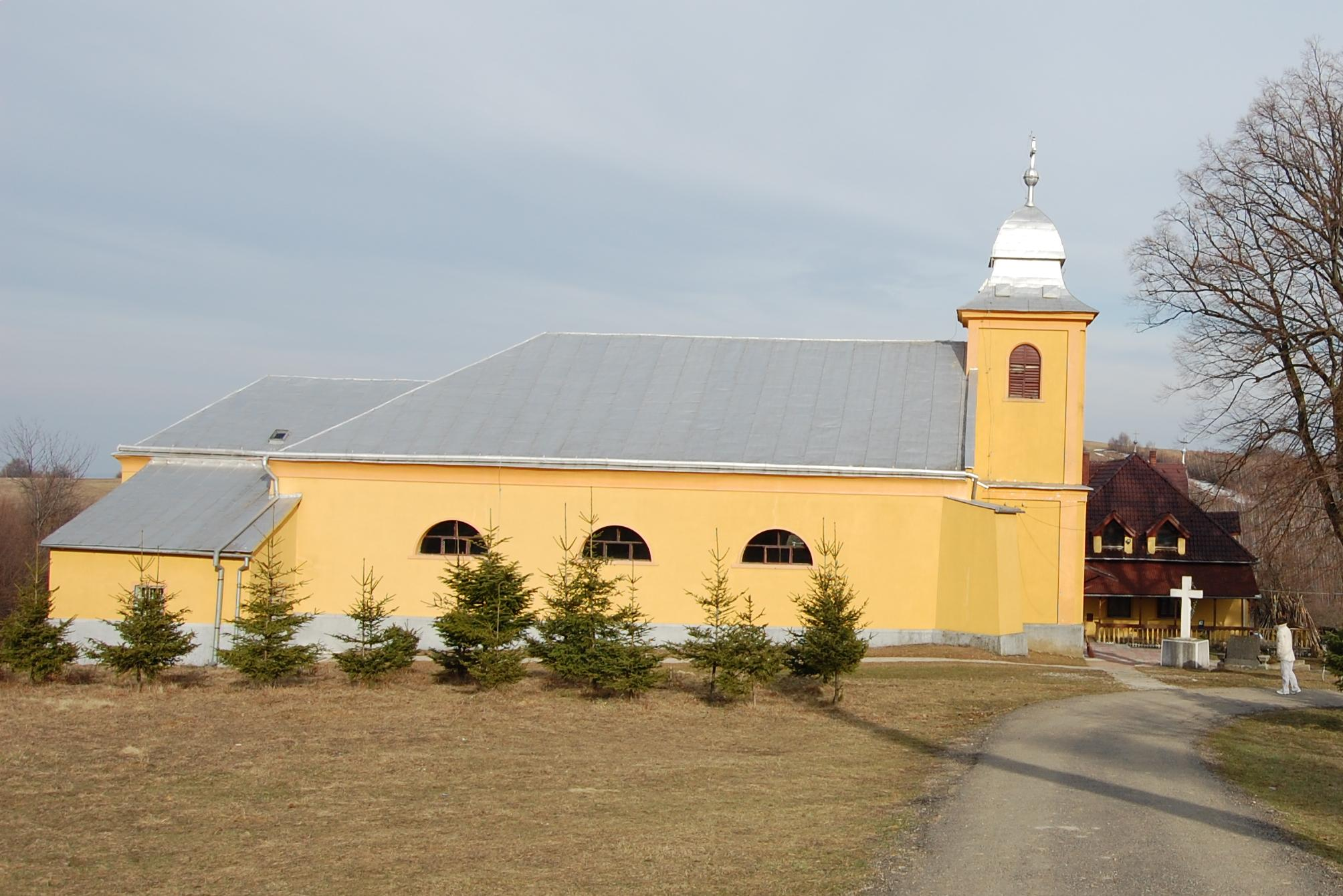

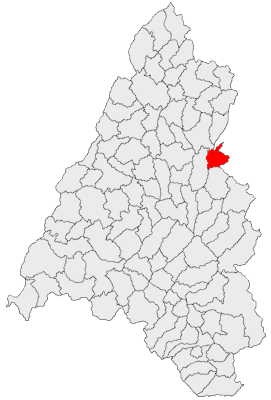
- Location in Bihor County

- Location in Romania
- Coordinates: 47°9′N 22°29′E
- Country: Romania
- County: Bihor
- Population (2021-12-01): 996
- Time zone: UTC+02:00 (EET)
  - Summer (DST): UTC+03:00 (EEST)
- Vehicle reg.: BH

Șinteu (Slovak: Nová Huta; Hungarian: Sólyomkővár) is a commune in Bihor County, Crișana, Romania with a population of 1,021 people. It is composed of four villages: Huta Voivozi (Stará Huta; Almaszeghuta), Socet (Huta Sočet; Forduló), Șinteu and Valea Târnei (Židáreň; Hármaspatak). 98.4% of the inhabitants are Slovaks, and 98.6% of them are Roman Catholic.
