= Boghiș =

Boghiș Szilágybagos
- Commune
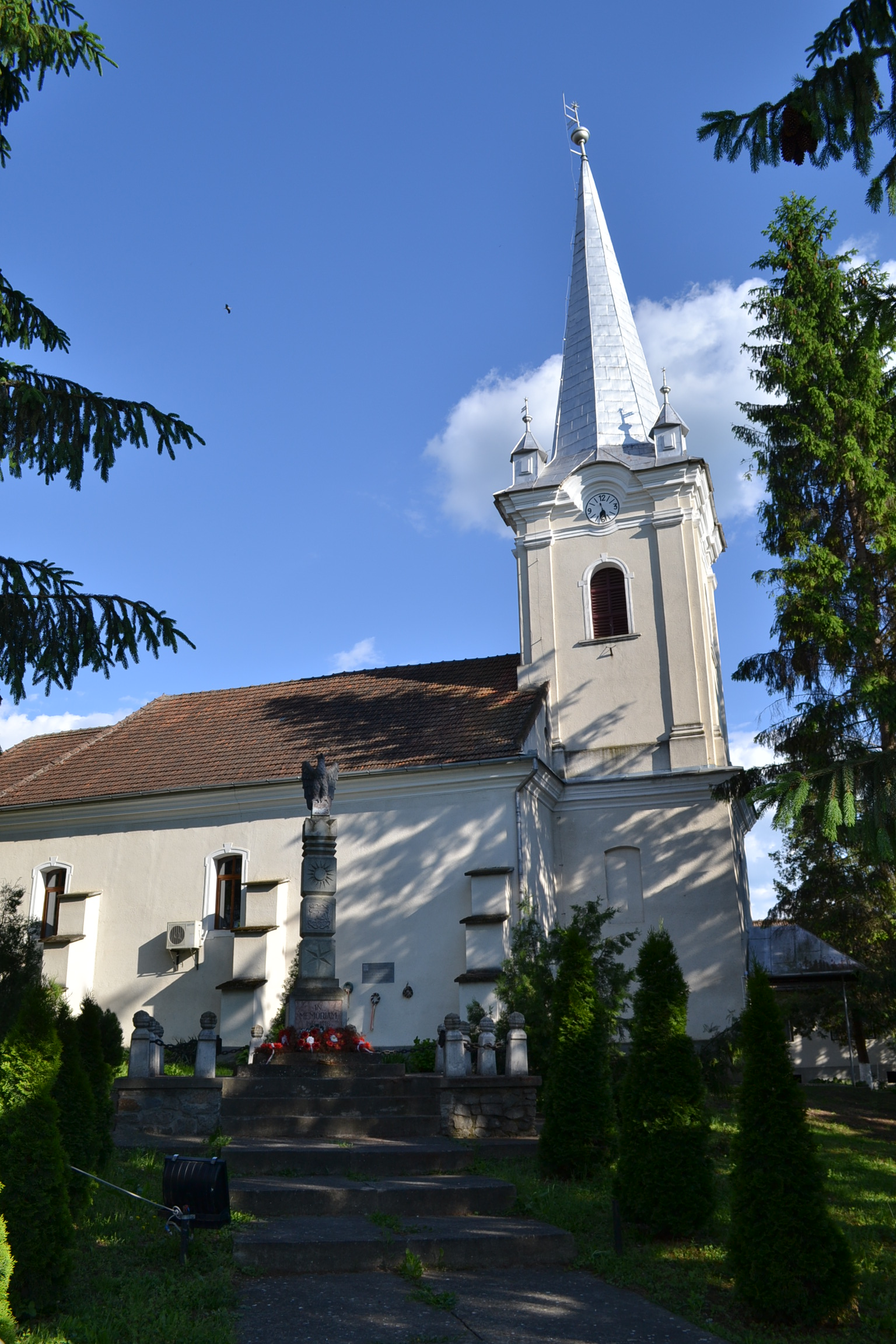
- Reformed church (1674)

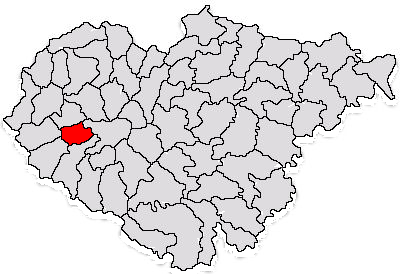
- Location in Sălaj County

- Location in Romania
- Coordinates: 47.1553°N 22.7365°E
- Country: Romania
- County: Sălaj

Government
  - Mayor (2020–2024): István Bernáth (UDMR)
- Area: 30.27 km^{2} (11.69 sq mi)
- Elevation: 236 m (774 ft)
- Population (2021-12-01): 1,909
  - Density: 63.07/km^{2} (163.3/sq mi)
- Time zone: UTC+02:00 (EET)
  - Summer (DST): UTC+03:00 (EEST)
- Postal code: 457262
- Area code: +(40) 0260
- Vehicle reg.: SJ
- Website: primariaboghis.ro

Boghiș (Hungarian: Szilágybagos) is a commune located in Sălaj County, Crișana, Romania. Established in 2005 by being split off from Nușfalău, it is composed of two villages, Boghiș and Bozieș (Szilágyborzás).

== Sights ==
- Reformed church in Boghiș, built in the 18th century (1792–1796)
- Reformed church in Bozieș, built in the 16th century
