= Sârbi, Bihor =

Sârbi
- Commune
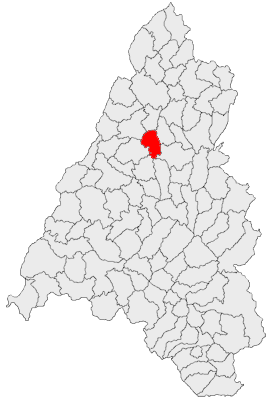
- Location in Bihor County

- Location in Romania
- Coordinates: 47°11′35″N 22°7′13″E
- Country: Romania
- County: Bihor
- Area: 62.67 km^{2} (24.20 sq mi)
- Population (2021-12-01): 2,345
  - Density: 37.42/km^{2} (96.91/sq mi)
- Time zone: UTC+02:00 (EET)
  - Summer (DST): UTC+03:00 (EEST)
- Vehicle reg.: BH

Sârbi (Hungarian: Alsótótfalu) is a commune in Bihor County, Crișana, Romania with a population of 2,345 people (2021). It is composed of seven villages: Almașu Mic (Szalárdalmás), Burzuc (Borszeg), Chioag (Kővág), Fegernic (Almásfegyvernek), Fegernicu Nou (Újfegyvernek), Sarcău (Szarkó) and Sârbi.

The oldest attested names for Fegernicu are Fegwernuk (1077-1097) and Olwar (1266).
