= Plopiș =

- Commune
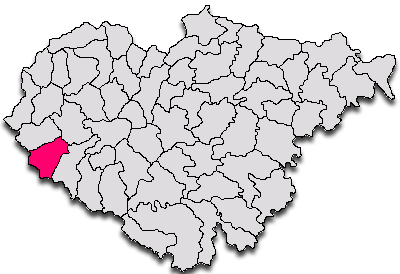
- Location in Sălaj County

- Location in Romania
- Coordinates: 47°07′42″N 22°39′14″E
- Country: Romania
- County: Sălaj

Government
  - Mayor (2020–2024): Nicolae Criste (PNL)
- Area: 80.38 km^{2} (31.03 sq mi)
- Elevation: 271 m (889 ft)
- Population (2021-12-01): 2,277
  - Density: 28/km^{2} (73/sq mi)
- Time zone: EET/EEST (UTC+2/+3)
- Postal code: 457270
- Area code: +(40) 260
- Vehicle reg.: SJ
- Website: www.comunaplopis.ro

Plopiș (Hungarian: Gyümölcsénes, Slovak: Plopiš) is a commune in Sălaj County, Crișana, Romania. It is composed of three villages: Făgetu (Hungarian: Magyarpatak, Slovak: Gemelčička), Iaz (Krasznajáz), and Plopiș.

At the 2021 census, the commune had 2,277 inhabitants; of those, 55.64% were Romanians, 22.79% Slovaks, and 15.94% Roma.

== Sights ==
- Nature reserve "Mlaștina de la Iaz"
