= Derna, Bihor =

Derna
- Commune
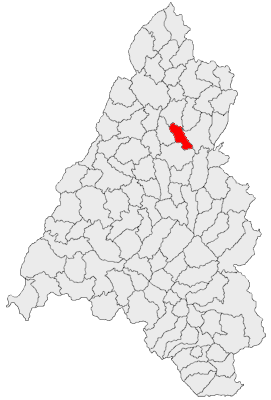
- Location in Bihor County

- Location in Romania
- Coordinates: 47°12′N 22°18′E
- Country: Romania
- County: Bihor
- Population (2021-12-01): 1,978
- Time zone: EET/EEST (UTC+2/+3)
- Vehicle reg.: BH

Derna (Hungarian: Felsőderna) is a commune in northwestern Bihor County, Crișana, Romania, 50 km from the county seat, Oradea and 35 km from Marghita. It borders the communes of Popești, Chișlaz, Brusturi and Spinuș. It is composed of five villages: Derna, Dernișoara (Alsóderna), Sacalasău (Sástelek), Sacalasău Nou (Újsástelek) and Tria (Terje).

== Demographics ==
At the 2011 census, 72.5% of inhabitants were Romanians, 19.4% Slovaks, 6.8% Hungarians and 1.1% Roma.

== Natives ==
- Miron Cozma (born 1954), former labor-union organizer and politician, and leader of the Jiu Valley coal miners' union
