= Frunziș =

Frunziș Leveleș
- Location within Romania

Location
- Country: Romania
- Counties: Bihor County, Arad County
- Villages: Olcea, Călacea, Berechiu, Apateu, Vânători, Zerindu Mic

Physical characteristics
- Mouth: Teuz
  - coordinates: 46.6280°N 21.5793°E
- Length: 35 km (22 mi)
- Basin size: 153 km^{2} (59 sq mi)

Basin features
- Progression: Teuz→ Crișul Negru→ Körös→ Tisza→ Danube→ Black Sea
- Tributaries
  - left: Călacea, Barcău

The Frunziș (also: Leveleș) is a right tributary of the river Teuz in Romania. It flows into the Teuz near Tămașda. Its length is 35 km (22 mi) and its basin size is 153 km^{2} (59 sq mi). The construction of the canalized lower course of the Beliu in 1914-19 disconnected it from its upper course, which now discharges into the Beliu near Berechiu.
