= Minezel =

River in Romania

- Location within Romania

Location
- Country: Romania
- Counties: Arad County
- Villages: Nădălbești, Minead

Physical characteristics
- Source: Codru-Moma Mountains
- Mouth: Sebiș
  - coordinates: 46.3807°N 22.1592°E
- Length: 11 km (6.8 mi)
- Basin size: 13 km^{2} (5.0 sq mi)

Basin features
- Progression: Sebiș→ Crișul Alb→ Körös→ Tisza→ Danube→ Black Sea

The Minezel is a right tributary of the river Sebiș in Romania. It flows into the Sebiș near the town Sebiș. Its length is 11 km (6.8 mi) and its basin size is 13 km^{2} (5.0 sq mi).
