= Groșeni =

Groșeni Valea Groșilor
- Location within Romania

Location
- Country: Romania
- Counties: Arad County
- Villages: Groșeni, Archiș

Physical characteristics
- Mouth: Teuz
  - coordinates: 46.4575°N 21.9837°E
- Length: 20 km (12 mi)
- Basin size: 62 km^{2} (24 sq mi)

Basin features
- Progression: Teuz→ Crișul Negru→ Körös→ Tisza→ Danube→ Black Sea
- Tributaries
  - left: Bârzești
  - right: Oșoiu, Râul Alb, Archișel

The Groșeni or Valea Groșilor is a right tributary of the river Teuz in Romania. It flows into the Teuz south of Beliu. Its length is 20 km (12 mi) and its basin size is 62 km^{2} (24 sq mi).
