= Moneasa (river) =

- Location within Romania

Location
- Country: Romania
- Counties: Bihor County, Arad County
- Villages: Moneasa, Rănușa, Dezna

Physical characteristics
- Source: Codru-Moma Mountains
- Mouth: Sebiș
  - coordinates: 46.4076°N 22.2486°E
- Length: 19 km (12 mi)
- Basin size: 81 km^{2} (31 sq mi)

Basin features
- Progression: Sebiș→ Crișul Alb→ Körös→ Tisza→ Danube→ Black Sea
- Tributaries
  - left: Lunga, Fumuri
  - right: Boroaia, Megheș

The Moneasa is a river in Bihor County and Arad County, Romania. At its confluence with the river Dezna in the village Dezna, the river Sebiș is formed. Its length is 19 km (12 mi) and its basin size is 81 km^{2} (31 sq mi).
