= Teuz =

- Location within Romania

Location
- Country: Romania
- Counties: Arad County
- Villages: Susani, Ignești, Cermei, Mișca

Physical characteristics
- Mouth: Crișul Negru
  - coordinates: 46.6380°N 21.5558°E
- Length: 87 km (54 mi)
- Basin size: 725 km^{2} (280 sq mi)

Basin features
- Progression: Crișul Negru→ Körös→ Tisza→ Danube→ Black Sea

The Teuz (Hungarian: Tőz) is a left tributary of the river Crișul Negru in Romania. It discharges into the Crișul Negru in Tămașda. Its length is 87 km (54 mi) and its basin size is 725 km^{2} (280 sq mi).

== Tributaries ==
The following rivers are tributaries to the Teuz:

- Left: Iacoberi, Fuleri
- Right: Valea Nouă, Gropoi, Groșeni, Beliu, Sartiș, Renișel, Frunziș
