= Mocirla River =

Mocirla River may refer to the following rivers in Romania:

- Mocirla, a tributary of the Pârâul Beldii in Covasna County
- Mocirla, a tributary of the Beliu in Arad County

== See also ==
- Mocirla
- Mocirlele River
