= Valea Nouă =

Valea Nouă may refer to the following rivers in Romania:

- Valea Nouă (Teuz), a tributary of the Teuz in Arad County
- Valea Nouă (Crișul Negru), a tributary of the Crișul Negru in Bihor County
- Valea Nouă Chișer, a tributary of the Crișul Alb in Arad County
