= Urviș =

Urviș or Urvișu may refer to several places in Romania:

- Urvișu de Beliu, a village in Hășmaș Commune, Arad County
- Urviș de Beiuș, a village in Șoimi Commune, Bihor County
- Urviș (river), a tributary of the Beliu in Arad County
