= Sebiș (river) =

- Location within Romania

Location
- Country: Romania
- Counties: Arad County
- Villages: Dezna, Sebiș

Physical characteristics
- Source: Confluence of headwaters Moneasa and Dezna
  - location: Codru-Moma Mountains
- Mouth: Crișul Alb
  - location: Sebiș
  - coordinates: 46.3687°N 22.1052°E

Basin features
- Progression: Crișul Alb→ Körös→ Tisza→ Danube→ Black Sea

The Sebiș is a right tributary of the river Crișul Alb in Romania. It discharges into the Crișul Alb near the town Sebiș. It is formed at the confluence of two headwaters Moneasa and Dezna. Its length, including the Dezna, is 30 km (19 mi) and its basin size is 211 km^{2} (81 sq mi).

== Tributaries ==
The following rivers are tributaries to the river Sebiș:

- Left: Dezna, Vâlceaua, Laz
- Right: Moneasa, Negrișoara, Minezel
