= Comunal-Central Stadium =

Multi-use stadium in Cermei, Romania

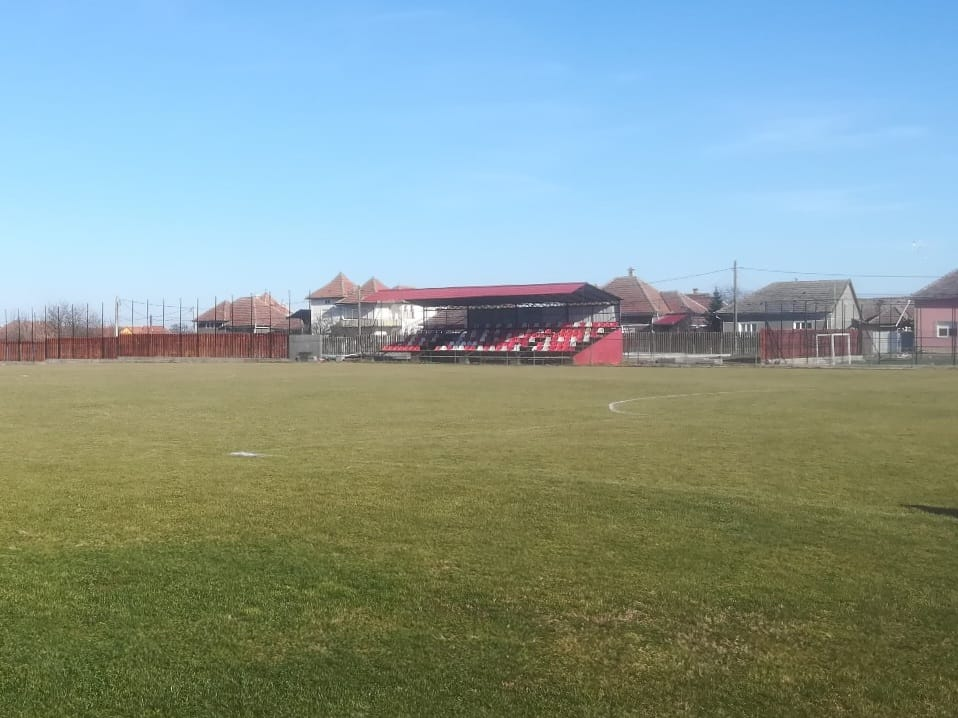
- Interactive map of Comunal-Central Stadium
- Address: Str. Stadionului
- Location: Cermei, Romania
- Coordinates: 46°32′47.1″N 21°50′20.4″E
- Owner: Commune of Cermei
- Operator: Gloria LT Cermei
- Capacity: 500 seated
- Surface: Grass

Construction
- Opened: 1980
- Renovated: 2010

Tenant
- Gloria LT Cermei (1980–2025)

The Comunal-Central Stadium is a multi-use stadium in Cermei, Romania. It is used mostly for football matches and was the home ground of Gloria Lunca-Teuz Cermei. The stadium holds 500 people on seats.
