= Tărpiu =

Tărpiu may refer to several villages in Romania:

- Tărpiu, a village in Dumitra Commune, Bistrița-Năsăud County
- Tărpiu, a village in Jichișu de Jos Commune, Cluj County
