= Sălăjeni =

Sălăjeni may refer to several villages in Romania:

- Sălăjeni, a village in town of Sebiş, Arad County
- Sălăjeni, a village in Bocşa Commune, Sălaj County
