= CS Gloria Lunca-Teuz Cermei =

Romanian football club

Gloria Lunca-Teuz Cermei
- Full name: Clubul Sportiv; Gloria Lunca-Teuz Cermei
- Nickname: Sămădăii
- Short name: Cermei
- Founded: 1980 as AS Cermei
- Dissolved: 2025
- Ground: Comunal-Central
- Capacity: 500
- 2024–25: Liga III, Seria IX, 9th (relegated)
Home colours	Away colours

Clubul Sportiv Gloria Lunca-Teuz Cermei, commonly known as Gloria LT Cermei, Gloria Cermei or simply as Cermei, is a Romanian football club based in Cermei, Arad County. The club was established in 1980, under the name of AS Cermei and knew a recent progress in the Romanian football league system, especially after its promotion to Liga III in 2016.

For almost its entire existence Gloria Cermei played only at county level Liga IV or Liga V, but was a constant presence at amateur level in the Arad County. Despite the fact that had not a long football tradition, comparative with other football clubs in the Arad County, Gloria Cermei had a growth from year to year, thus promoting to Liga III in 2016, where it remained for seasons in a row, becoming the most constant presence at this level for Arad County.

== History ==
Gloria Lunca-Teuz Cermei was established in the early 1980s, under the name of AS Cermei and after a couple of seasons spent in the lowest league of Arad County, promoted to Liga IV, at the end of the 1982–83 season. After two modest seasons, AS Cermei relegated back, at the end of the 1984–85 season, when it was ranked 17th of 18 teams. For the next decade, the white and reds remained in the Liga V, with no important results, then in the 1996–97 season appeared again in the best division of Arad County, now under the name of Gloria Cermei. It will be another short-lived appearance, because after only three years spent at this level, the team based in Cermei will go back to the lowest division for the next 14 years, until it will promote again, this time under the name of Victoria Lunca-Teuz Cermei, in 2014. In the first season, sămădăii were ranked 4th, then at the end of the 2015–16 season won the league, for the first time in the history of the club.

In the promotion play-offs, Gloria LT Cermei had a big rival in Viitorul Feleacu, champions of Liga IV Cluj, but it managed to win the double, 3–2 on aggregate (after extra time) and promoted to Liga III, by far the most important performance in the history of Gloria. Despite the fact that many supporters expected the Arad County team to not be up to the level and to quickly return to the county league, Gloria Cermei not only did it resist, but it became the longest-lived and most constant presence in the county at this level, marking no less than 9 consecutive seasons in the third tier. In all these years, the team was a well known farm team of UTA Arad, the most important football club in the region and registered the following rankings: 8th (2016–17), 10th (2017–18), 4th (2018–19), 9th (2019–20), 8th (2020–21), 5th (2021–22), 10th (2022–23) and 8th (2023–24).

== Ground ==
Gloria Lunca-Teuz Cermei plays its home matches on Comunal-Central Stadium, in Cermei, Arad County, a small stadium with a capacity of 500 people, all on seats.

== Honours ==
Liga IV – Arad County

- Winners (1): 2015–16

Liga V – Arad County

- Winners (3): 1982–83, 1995–96, 2013–14

=== Other performances ===
- Appearances in Liga III: 9
- Best finish in Liga III: 4th (2018–19)
- Best finish in Cupa României: Fourth Round (2018–19)

== League history ==
Season	Tier	Division	Place	Notes	Cupa României
2024–25	3	Liga III (Seria IX)	9th	Relegated	Third Round
2023–24	3	Liga III (Seria VIII)	8th		First Round
2022–23	3	Liga III (Seria VIII)	10th		First Round
2021–22	3	Liga III (Seria VIII)	5th		First Round
2020–21	3	Liga III (Seria VIII)	8th		Third Round
2019–20	3	Liga III (Seria IV)	9th		Third Round

Season	Tier	Division	Place	Notes	Cupa României
2018–19	3	Liga III (Seria IV)	4th		Fourth Round
2017–18	3	Liga III (Seria IV)	10th		Second Round
2016–17	3	Liga III (Seria IV)	8th		Preliminary Round
2015–16	4	Liga IV (AR)	1st (C, P)	Promoted	Preliminary Round
2014–15	4	Liga IV (AR)	4th		Preliminary Round
2013–14	5	Liga V (AR)	1st (C, P)	Promoted	Preliminary Round
