= Mideș =

- Location within Romania

Location
- Country: Romania
- Counties: Arad County
- Villages: Secaci, Bochia, Benești

Physical characteristics
- Mouth: Beliu
  - location: Beliu
  - coordinates: 46.4924°N 21.9802°E
- Length: 17 km (11 mi)
- Basin size: 38 km^{2} (15 sq mi)

Basin features
- Progression: Beliu→ Crișul Negru→ Körös→ Tisza→ Danube→ Black Sea

The Mideș is a right tributary of the river Beliu in Romania. It flows into the Beliu in the village Beliu. Its length is 17 km (11 mi) and its basin size is 38 km^{2} (15 sq mi).
