= Archis =

Archis may refer to:

- Archi people
- Archis, Armenia
- Archiș, a commune in Arad County, Romania
