= Gropoi =

- Location within Romania

Location
- Country: Romania
- Counties: Arad County
- Villages: Cărand

Physical characteristics
- Mouth: Teuz
  - coordinates: 46.4383°N 22.0407°E
- Length: 10 km (6.2 mi)
- Basin size: 18 km^{2} (6.9 sq mi)

Basin features
- Progression: Teuz→ Crișul Negru→ Körös→ Tisza→ Danube→ Black Sea

The Gropoi is a right tributary of the river Teuz in Romania. It flows into the Teuz near Cărand. Its length is 10 km (6.2 mi) and its basin size is 18 km^{2} (6.9 sq mi).
