= Vasile Goldiș =

Romanian politician (1862–1934)

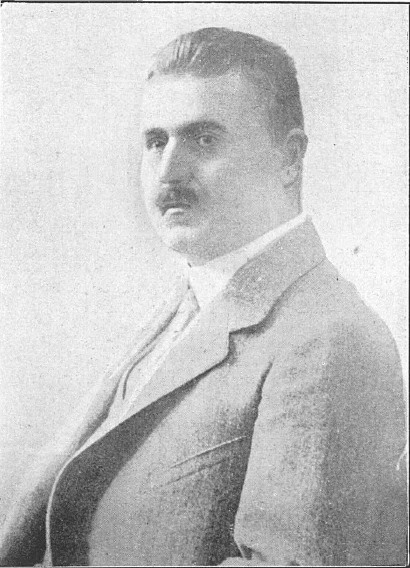
Photo of Goldiș, published in 1937

Vasile Goldiș (12 November 1862 – 10 February 1934) was a Romanian politician, social theorist, and member of the Romanian Academy.

== Early life ==
He was born on 12 November 1862 in his grandfather's (Teodor Goldiș) house in the village of Mocirla. His parents were Isaia and Floarea Goldiș. The family of his father had its origins in the Chișcău village, Bihor County. Around 1740 Teodor Goldiș moved with his family to Mocirla where Vasile Goldiș was born.

The first years of his life were spent in the villages of Mocirla, Seleuș, and Cermei in the house of his parents and grandparents. He started primary school in the village of Cermei in 1869 where he studied the first two grades in Romanian with his teacher Nicolae Albu. He studied the third grade at the general school in Padanul Nou (now Horea, Arad County). Between 1873 and 1881, he was a student of the Theoretical High School in Arad, being especially interested in history, literature, and philosophy.

On 1 September 1881, he joined the classes of the Faculty of Letters and Philosophy in Arad as a scholar of the Eastern Orthodox Church. In 1881–1882 and 1884–1885 he was a student of the University of Budapest and between 1882 and 1884 he studied at the University of Vienna, where he received a Bachelor of Arts degree. During his student years, he became a member of the Petru Maior and Romania Jună societies.

After graduating, he became a professor at the Eötvös High School in Budapest on 1 September 1885. One year later he quit this job for patriotic reasons and moved to Caransebeș, where he taught history and Latin at the Pedagogic-Theological Institute.

Being eager to affirm himself in the struggle of the intellectual Romanians for more political rights in Austria-Hungary, on 5 March 1888 he sent a letter to George Barițiu, asking for a teacher job in Sibiu. A year later, on 1 September 1889, he was appointed professor in Brașov, where he remained until 1901. He wrote many books on Latin, History, and Constitutional Law for his students. In 1890 he became a member and then secretary of the Romanian House in Brașov.

== Political activity ==
=== Before the war ===
In 1893 he became a member of the Romanian National Party and a collaborator in the Tribuna newspaper in Sibiu. Between 1895 and 1901 he acted as secretary at the Society for the Creation of the Romanian Theater which sponsored young Romanian actors from Transylvania.

Since 1905 Vasile Goldiș devoted himself to political activity. On 10 January 1905 at the Romanian National Party (RNP) convention he demanded that passive resistance towards the governments in Budapest and Vienna be put aside and asked for a new active and dynamic tactic in the struggle for more political rights of the Romanians in Austria-Hungary.

This tactic, known as the "new activism", was not immediately adopted by the party but all the leaders were consonant with the idea. He wrote together with Emanoil Ungureanu and Ioan Mihu a memorandum on behalf of the RNP to the Hungarian government on 13 September 1910.

The memo stated the following requests: the legal recognition on the National Romanian Party, the implementation of the universal vote and the repeal of the Apponyi educational law. All these requests were rejected, the RNP was dissolved and merged with other parties in Hungary.

The differences in opinions in the National Party concerning the talks with the Hungarian government sparked between 1910 and 1911 dissidences within the party. As a result, two separate wings formed: the radical wing, represented by the young members of the party, grouped around the Tribuna newspaper (Octavian Goga, Ilarie Chendi, Onisifor Ghibu, Vasile Bocu) and the moderate wing, represented by the older members of the party.

At first Vasile Goldiș joined the moderates, but after he had realized that this conflict would have irreparable consequences on the activity of the party, he suggested (together with Aurel Lazăr, Ioan Suciu, Vasile Lucaciu, and Ștefan Cicio Pop) a compromise in order to preserve the political unity of the Romanians in Transylvania.

Under these circumstances, in January 1911 he was appointed head of the Românul newspaper, published at Arad. Românul would become the voice of the Romanian political struggle after the close-down of the Tribuna newspaper in March 1912.

=== During the war ===
During the First World War, he refused to sign the loyalty declaration towards Hungary as requested by the Tisza government. This act, qualified by the Hungarian authorities as "duplicity and lack of patriotism", determined the suspension of the Românul newspaper in March 1916.

During the war, Vasile Goldiș continued to fight the official policy of Magyarization. He protested against the internment in concentration camps of some ethnic Romanians suspected of treason by the Hungarian government.

== Great National Assembly of Alba Iulia and Directory Council of Transylvania ==
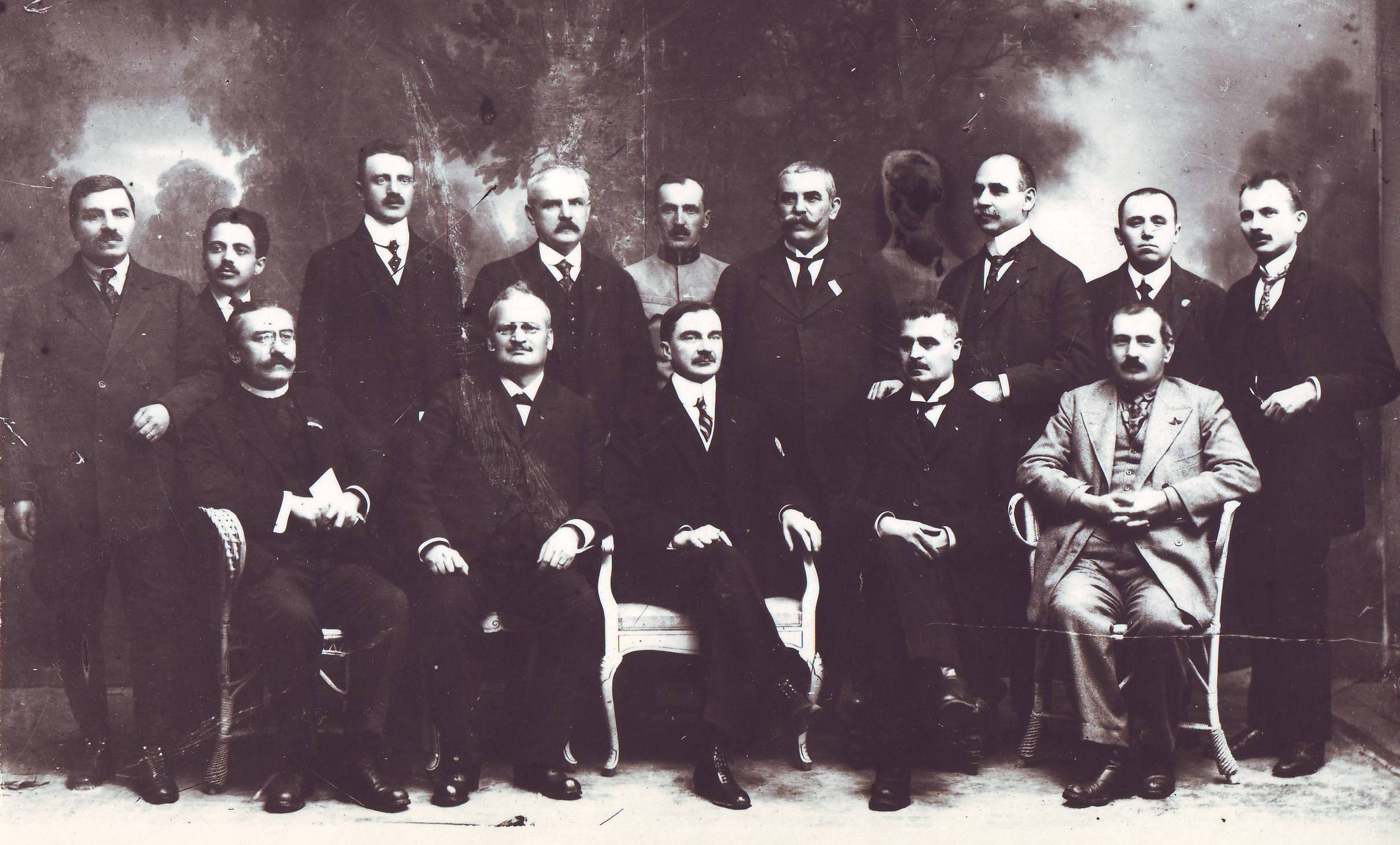
Vasile Goldiş (fourth from the left, bottom row) in the Directory Council of Transylvania, 1918

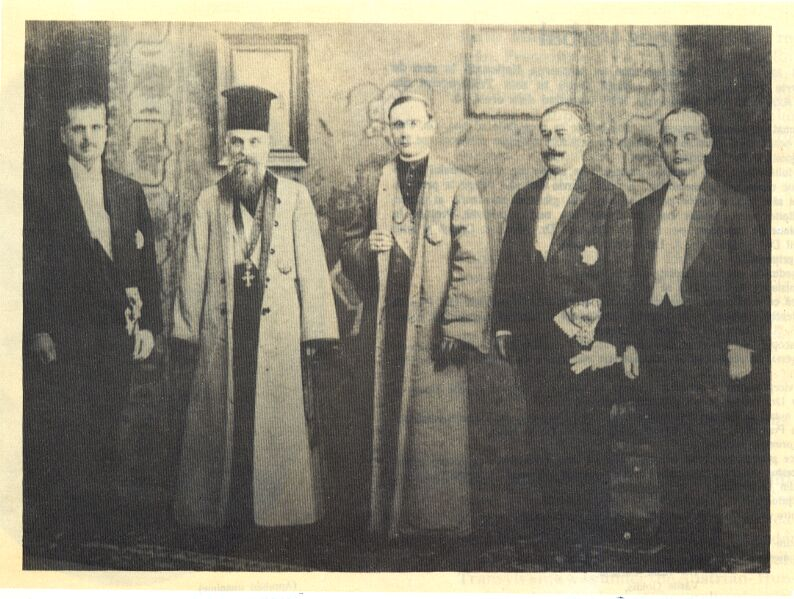
Vasile Goldiş (first from the left) as a member of the Romanian Transylvanian delegation that brought to Bucharest the act of union of Transylvania with the Kingdom of Romania

== Late life ==
On 2 May 1926 he was elected president of the national congress of the Romanian National Party at Sibiu, but he stepped down after a short period and dedicated his time to cultural activities.

Vasile Goldiș lived his last years in Arad in modest conditions. He died on 10 February 1934.

In his honor several memorial services were held and the day of his burial was declared a day of national mourning. The Vasile Goldiș Western University of Arad is named in his honour.
