= Coroi =

Coroi is the name of several villages in Romania:

- Coroi, a village in Craiva, Arad
- Coroi, a village in Coroisânmărtin Commune, Mureș County
