= Berechiu =

Berechiu may refer to several villages in Romania:

- Berechiu, a village in Apateu Commune, Arad County
- Berechiu, a village in Sânnicolau Român Commune, Bihor County
