= Dezna (river) =

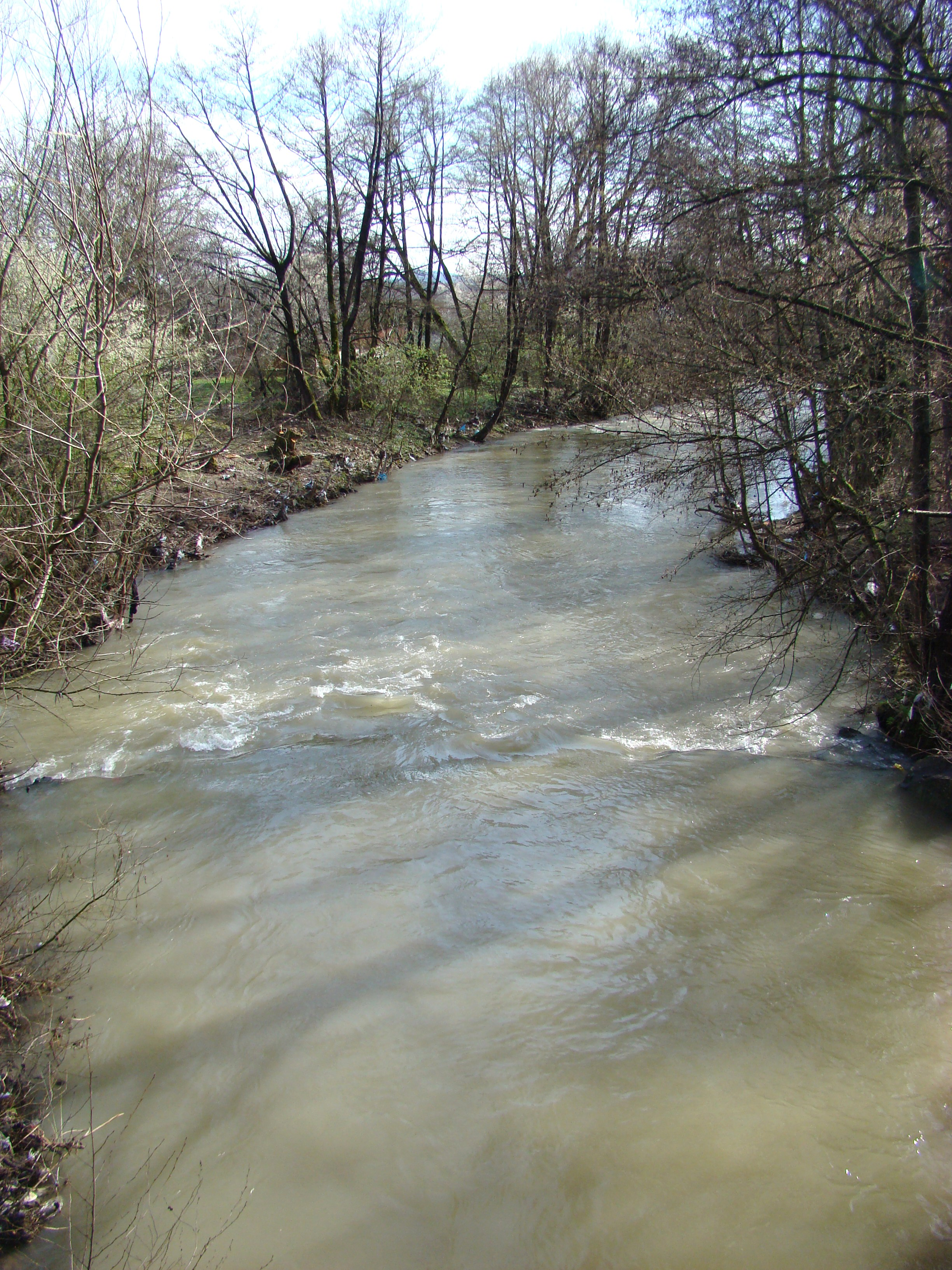

- Location within Romania

Location
- Country: Romania
- Counties: Arad County
- Villages: Dezna

Physical characteristics
- Source: Codru-Moma Mountains
- Mouth: Sebiș
  - location: Dezna
  - coordinates: 46.4076°N 22.2486°E
- Length: 15 km (9.3 mi)
- Basin size: 48 km^{2} (19 sq mi)

Basin features
- Progression: Sebiș→ Crișul Alb→ Körös→ Tisza→ Danube→ Black Sea

The Dezna is a river in Arad County, Romania. At its confluence with the river Moneasa in the village Dezna, the river Sebiș is formed. The Dezna is also considered the upper course of the Sebiș. Its length is 15 km (9.3 mi) and its basin size is 48 km^{2} (19 sq mi).
