= Susani =

Susani may refer to several villages in Romania:

- Susani, a village in Ignești Commune, Arad County
- Susani, a village in Traian Vuia Commune, Timiș County
- Șușani, a commune in Vâlcea County.
- Susani - goddess from India

Or, in music, to

- Susani, another name for the song Vom Himmel hoch, o Engel, kommt
