= Bârzești =

Bârzeşti may refer to several villages in Romania:

- Bârzeşti, a village in Archiș Commune, Arad County
- Bârzeşti, a village in Vulturești, Argeș
- Bârzeşti, a village in Ștefan cel Mare, Vaslui
- Bârzeşti, a village in Bărbătești, Vâlcea
