= Chișer =

- Location within Romania

Location
- Country: Romania
- Counties: Arad County
- Villages: Olari

Physical characteristics
- Mouth: Crișul Alb
  - location: Olari
  - coordinates: 46.4018°N 21.5711°E
- Length: 10 km (6.2 mi)
- Basin size: 41 km^{2} (16 sq mi)

Basin features
- Progression: Canalul Morilor→ Crișul Alb→ Körös→ Tisza→ Danube→ Black Sea

The Chișer is a small river in Arad County, Romania. Formerly a left tributary of the river Crișul Alb, it now discharges into the Canalul Morilor, which flows parallel to the south of the Crișul Alb. Its length is 10 km (6.2 mi) and its basin size is 41 km^{2} (16 sq mi). The former lower course of the Chișer is now the Valea Nouă Chișer.
