= Călacea =

Călacea may refer to the following places in Romania:

- Călacea, a village in Olcea Commune, Bihor County
- Călacea, a village in Gârbou Commune, Sălaj County
- Călacea, a village in Orțișoara Commune, Timiș County
