= Laz (river) =

- Location within Romania

Location
- Country: Romania
- Counties: Arad

Physical characteristics
- Source: Codru-Moma Mountains
- Mouth: Sebiș
  - coordinates: 46.3766°N 22.1554°E
- Length: 8 km (5.0 mi)
- Basin size: 20 km^{2} (7.7 sq mi)

Basin features
- Progression: Sebiș→ Crișul Alb→ Körös→ Tisza→ Danube→ Black Sea
- Tributaries
  - left: Chioara

The Laz is a left tributary of the river Sebiș in Romania. It flows into the Sebiș near the town Sebiș. Its length is 8 km (5.0 mi) and its basin size is 20 km^{2} (7.7 sq mi).
