= Botfei =

- Location within Romania

Location
- Country: Romania
- Counties: Arad County
- Villages: Botfei, Agrișu Mic, Comănești

Physical characteristics
- Mouth: Beliu
  - location: Comănești
  - coordinates: 46.5091°N 22.0456°E
- Length: 16 km (9.9 mi)
- Basin size: 36 km^{2} (14 sq mi)

Basin features
- Progression: Beliu→ Crișul Negru→ Körös→ Tisza→ Danube→ Black Sea

The Botfei is a right tributary of the river Beliu in Romania. It flows into the Beliu in Comănești. Its length is 16 km (9.9 mi) and its basin size is 36 km^{2} (14 sq mi).
