= Ștefan Cicio Pop =

Romanian politician (1865–1934)

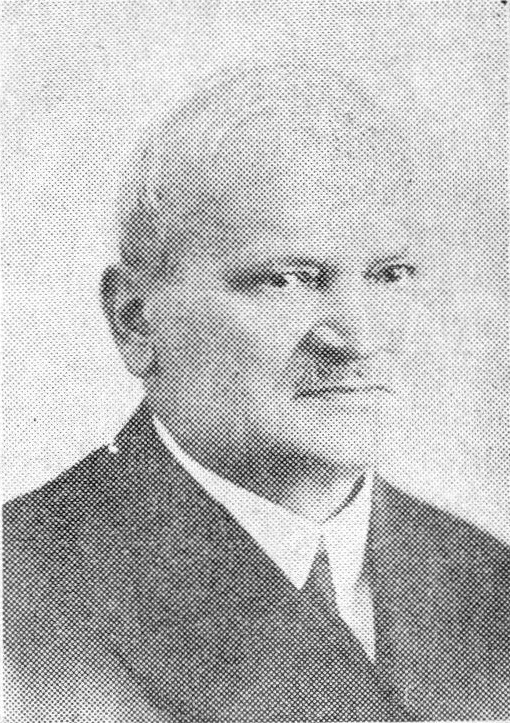

Chamber of Deputies
- Incumbent
- Assumed office 1905 – 1918 in the Parliament of Budapest; 1919–1933 in the Parliament of Romania

Minister for Transylvania
- In office 5 December 1919 – 12 March 1920

Minister of Foreign Affairs ad interim
- In office 15 January 1920 – 13 March 1920

President of the Council of Ministers ad interim
- In office 15 January 1920 – 13 March 1920

Personal details
- Born: April 1, 1865 Sajgó, Austrian Empire (today part of Jichișu de Jos, Romania)
- Died: 16 February 1934 (aged 68) Conop, Arad, Romania
- Citizenship: Hungary, Romania
- Party: Romanian National Party; National Peasants' Party
- Spouse: Eugenia Cicio Pop
- Education: Eötvös Loránd University
- Occupation: Politician, lawyer
- Profession: Lawyer

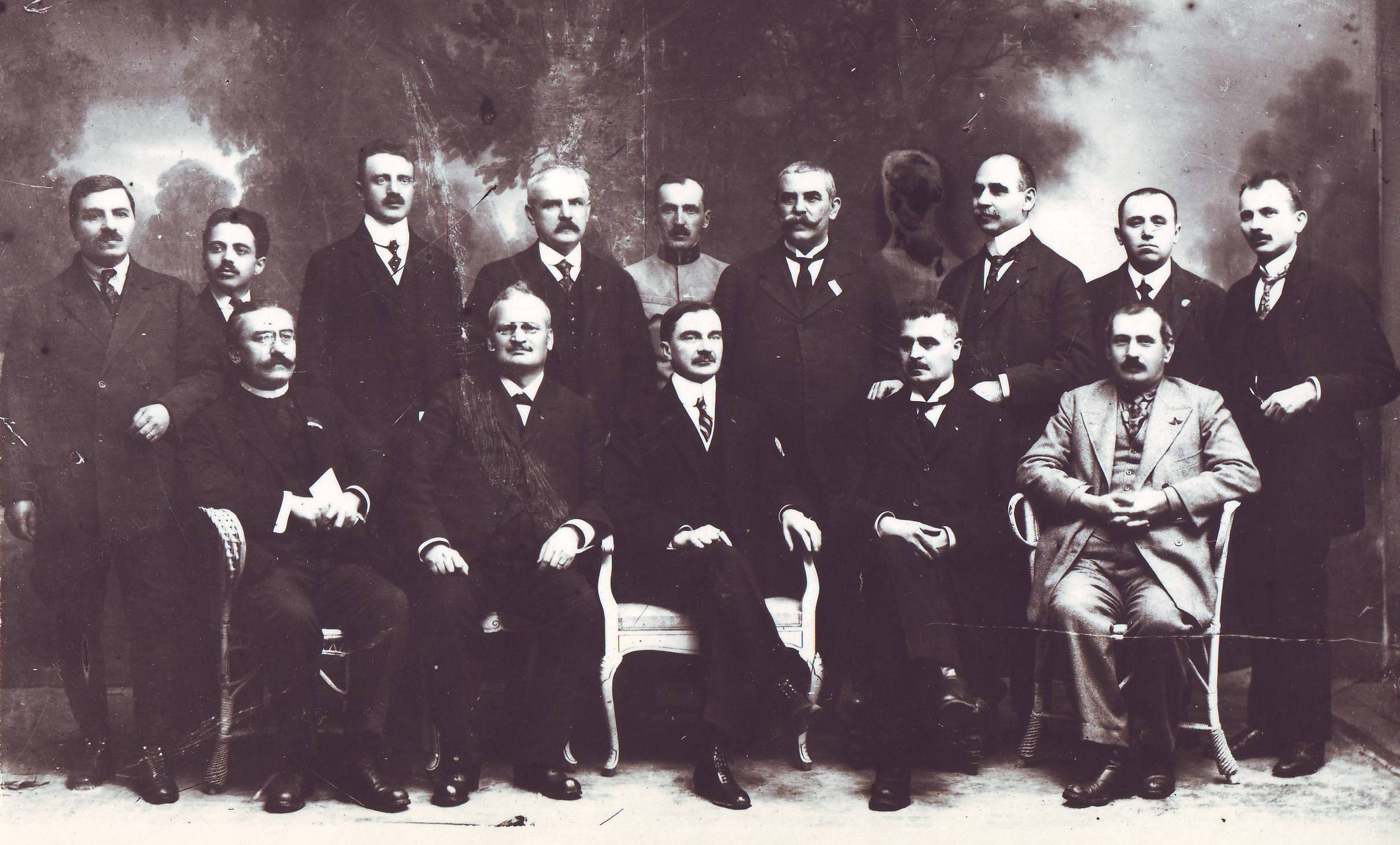
The Transylvanian Directory in 1918; Cicio Pop is seated, second from left.

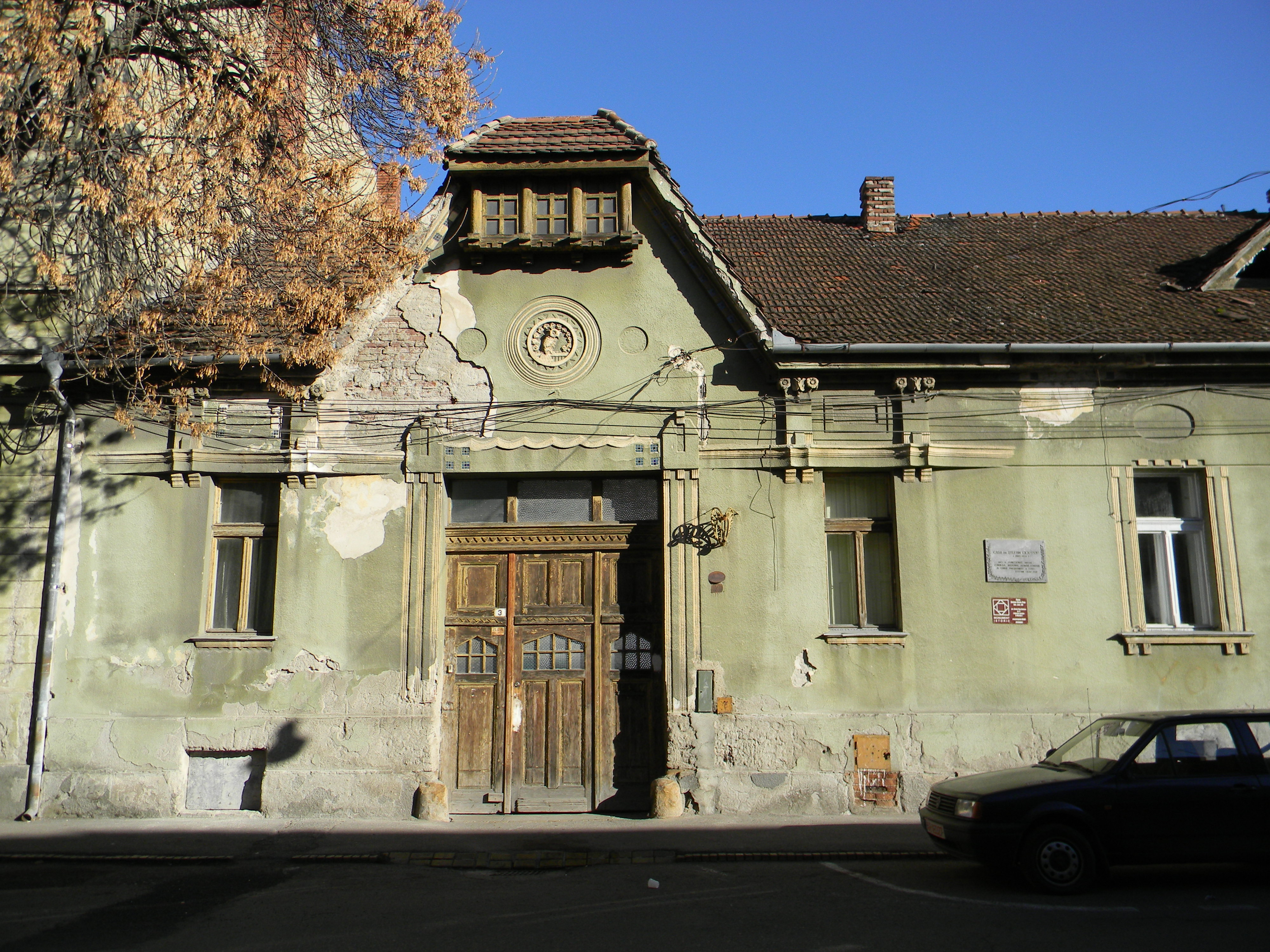
Cicio Pop's house in Arad, which served as headquarters for the Central Romanian National Council.

Ștefan Cicio Pop (1 April 1865 – 16 February 1934) was a Romanian politician.

== Biography ==
Born in Sajgó, Belső-Szolnok County, Principality of Transylvania, Austrian Empire, Pop's maternal grandfather was the Greek-Catholic canon Vasile Pop, who supported the boy's expenses during his school years. After attending high school in Szamosújvár (Gherla) and Nagyszeben (Sibiu), he went to the universities of Vienna and Budapest, obtaining a doctorate in law from the latter institution in 1891. The same year, he became a lawyer in Arad.

== Political activity ==
Pop entered the Romanian National Party (PNR) while still a student, and drew notice for championing the defendants in the 1894 Transylvanian Memorandum trial. In 1895, together with Gheorghe Pop de Băsești, he represented the Romanians at the Budapest congress of nationalities. Following the PNR's switch to an activist political stance, Pop sat in the Hungarian House of Representatives from 1905 to 1918. He contributed to the press, including the dailies Lupta (Budapest) and Românul (Arad).

Pop, as a member of the PNR executive, was involved in the process leading up to and following the union of Transylvania with Romania. He attended the party congress in Oradea on 12 October 1918, that adopted the declaration of self-determination for the Romanians and formed an Arad-based action committee that included Pop. On 30 October, he was named president of the Central Romanian National Council, which took control of the increasingly autonomous Transylvania as Austria-Hungary crumbled near the end of World War I. As such, Pop led negotiations between the PNR and the Socialist Party of Transylvania. One day later, on 1 December, Pop was at Alba Iulia, where he served as vice president of the Great National Assembly of Alba Iulia that proclaimed the union. According to a source, Ștefan Cicio Pop delayed by a couple of hours the opening of the session of the Great National Assembly and held the inaugural address without being asked to or mandated to do so by the elected President of the Assembly, Gheorghe Pop de Băsești. On 2 December, Pop became vice president and head of the army and public safety department within the Directory Council, the temporary authority of Transylvania.

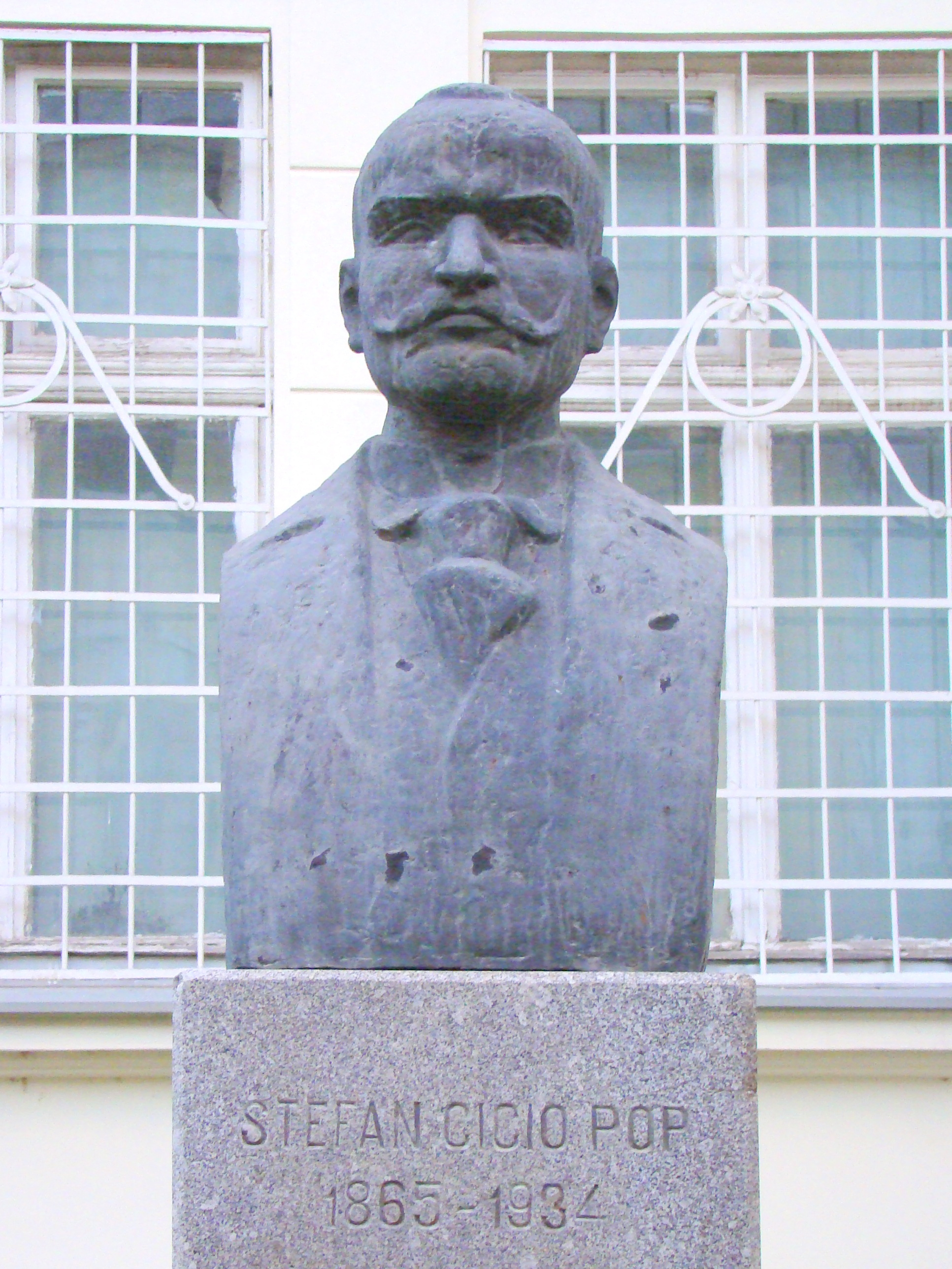
Bust of Ștefan Cicio Pop in Alba Iulia

As such, Pop went to the Parliament of Romania in Bucharest and submitted the legislative proposal for the union, together with Ion Inculeț and Ion Nistor, who supplied similar proposals for, respectively, Bessarabia and Bukovina. All three were adopted at the end of 1919, in the first parliament of Greater Romania. During this time, Pop belonged to three successive cabinets, serving as Minister without portfolio for Transylvania under Ion I. C. Brătianu (December 1918 – September 1919), Artur Văitoianu (September–November 1919) and Alexandru Vaida-Voievod (December 1919 – March 1920). He first won a term in the Romanian Assembly of Deputies in 1919.

In 1926, after the PNR merged with the Peasants' Party to form the National Peasants' Party, Pop became vice president of the new formation. Active as a diplomat, he led the Romanian delegation to the first Balkan Conference, held at Athens in 1930; and to the second, at Istanbul in 1931, where he led the committee for political rapprochement. The 1932 conference took place at Bucharest, and Pop was its president. He was twice Assembly President: December 1928 to April 1931, and August 1932 to November 1933. Pop died in Arad, days after Vasile Goldiș. Among the participants at the funeral were Prime Minister Gheorghe Tătărescu, Iuliu Maniu, Ion Mihalache, Sever Bocu, Alexandru Nicolescu and Nicolae Săveanu.

== Tributes ==
=== Numismatic ===
On the occasion of the centenary of the Great Union, on 26 November 2018, the National Bank of Romania put into circulation, for the attention of the numismatists, a set of coins; on the obverse of each of the coins in the set are engraved a processing of a photo done by Samoilă Mârza, the texts (in a circle) ROMANIA and THE GREAT MEETING FROM ALBA IULIA, the nominal value, the coat of arms of Romania and the thousandths (the year of issue) 2018. On the reverse part of each coin is engraved the effigies of Stefan Cicio Pop, Gheorghe Pop de Băsești, Iuliu Maniu, Vasile Goldiș and Iuliu Hossu. Gold coins have a nominal value of 500 lei (200 copies), silver coins have a nominal value of 10 lei (200 copies), and those of common metal have a nominal value of 50 dollars (5,000 copies), all of proof quality. In the same set of coins, 1,000,000 medal coins of general UNC quality were issued.
