= Salca =

Salca Codor
- Location within Romania

Location
- Country: Romania
- Counties: Cluj County
- Villages: Codor, Dej

Physical characteristics
- Mouth: Someș
  - location: Dej
  - coordinates: 47.1475°N 23.8767°E
- Length: 13 km (8.1 mi)
- Basin size: 45 km^{2} (17 sq mi)

Basin features
- Progression: Someș→ Tisza→ Danube→ Black Sea
- Tributaries
  - left: Jichiș

The Salca (also: Codor) is a left tributary of the river Someș in Romania. It discharges into the Someș in Dej. Its length is 13 km (8.1 mi) and its basin size is 45 km^{2} (17 sq mi).
