= Iacoberi =

- Location within Romania

Location
- Country: Romania
- Counties: Arad County
- Villages: Gurba

Physical characteristics
- Mouth: Teuz
  - coordinates: 46.5069°N 21.7188°E
- Length: 23 km (14 mi)
- Basin size: 60 km^{2} (23 sq mi)

Basin features
- Progression: Teuz→ Crișul Negru→ Körös→ Tisza→ Danube→ Black Sea

The Iacoberi is a left tributary of the river Teuz in Romania. It flows into the Teuz near Chereluș. Its length is 23 km (14 mi) and its basin size is 60 km^{2} (23 sq mi).
