= Sartiș =

- Location within Romania

Location
- Country: Romania
- Counties: Arad County
- Villages: Ciuntești, Stoinești, Rogoz de Beliu

Physical characteristics
- Mouth: Beliu
  - location: Cermei
  - coordinates: 46.5637°N 21.8810°E
- Length: 21 km (13 mi)
- Basin size: 77 km^{2} (30 sq mi)

Basin features
- Progression: Beliu→ Crișul Negru→ Körös→ Tisza→ Danube→ Black Sea
- Tributaries
  - left: Mărăuș
  - right: Valea Mare

The Sartiș is a right tributary of the river Beliu in Romania. Formerly a right tributary of the Teuz, its flow was intercepted by the canalized lower course of the Beliu near Cermei in 1914–1919. Its length is 21 km (13 mi) and its basin size is 77 km^{2} (30 sq mi). Its disconnected lower course continues towards the Teuz near Mișca.
