= Pilu, Arad =

Pilu
- Commune
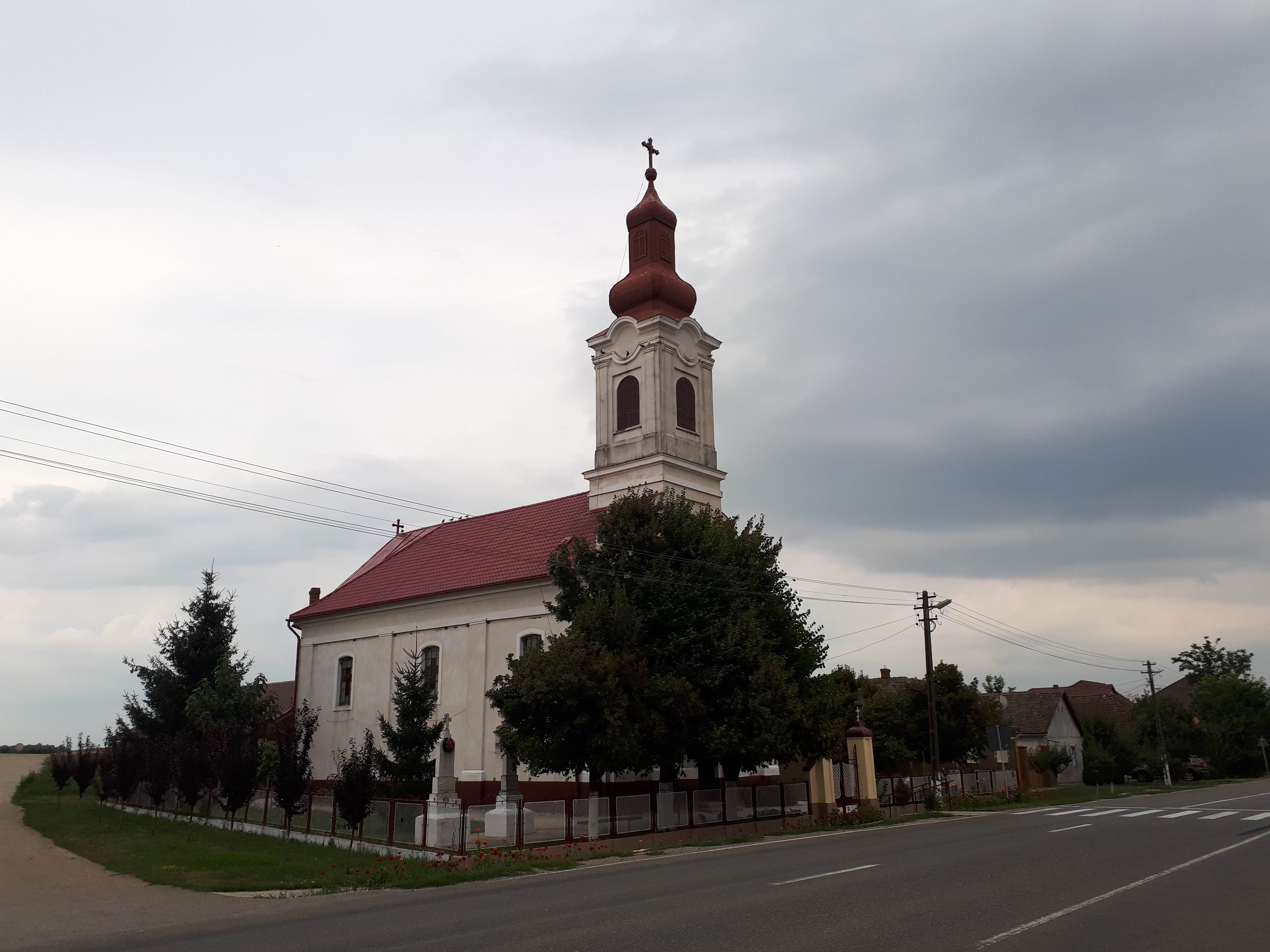
- Roman Catholic church of Vărșand

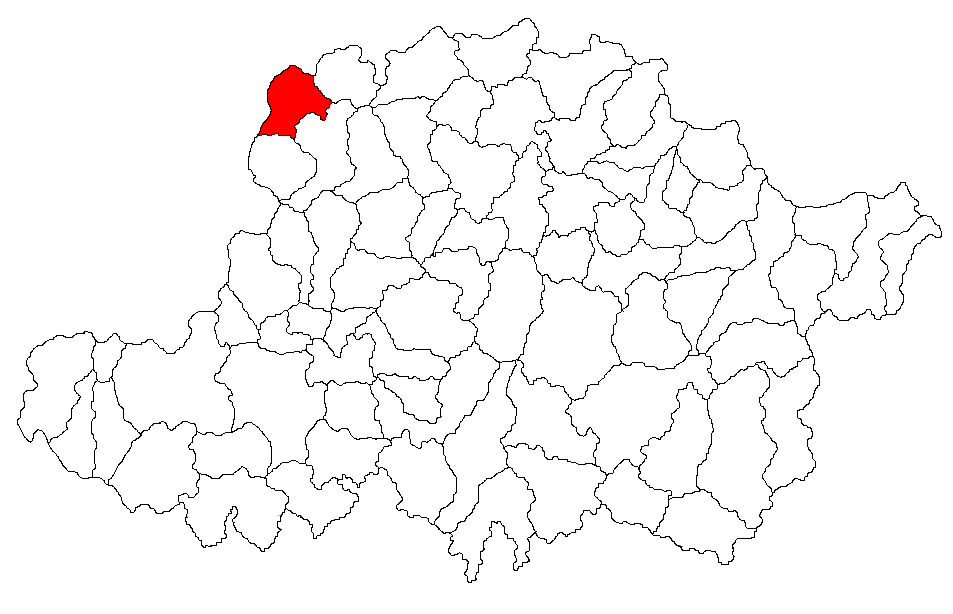
- Location in Arad County

- Location in Romania
- Coordinates: 46°34′N 21°21′E
- Country: Romania
- County: Arad

Government
  - Mayor (2020–2024): Dan-Lucian Drăgan (PNL)
- Area: 76.4 km^{2} (29.5 sq mi)
- Elevation: 89 m (292 ft)
- Population (2021-12-01): 2,078
  - Density: 27.2/km^{2} (70.4/sq mi)
- Time zone: UTC+02:00 (EET)
  - Summer (DST): UTC+03:00 (EEST)
- Area code: 317255
- Vehicle reg.: AR
- Website: www.comunapilu.ro

Pilu (Hungarian: Nagypél) is a commune in Arad County, Romania, is situated on the Criș Plateau, in the north-western part of the county, at the western border of Romania. The commune stretches over 7,640 ha (18,900 acres) and is composed of two villages, Pilu (situated at 62 km (39 mi) from Arad) and Vărșand (Gyulavarsánd).

== Population ==
According to the last census the population of the commune counts 1976 inhabitants, out of which 84.0% are Romanians, 7.5% Hungarians, 8.0% Roma, and 0.5% are of other or undeclared nationalities.

== History ==
Although the traces of inhabitance on this place are very old, traces from the Bronze Age having been found in Vârșand, Pilu was first mentioned in documents in 1283, while Vărșand in 1214.

== Economy ==
The commune's present-day economy can be characterized by a powerful dynamic force, with significant developments in all the sectors. Vârșand is a significant road frontier crossing point.

== Tourism ==
Situated on a plateau, the natural touristic fond of the commune is not abundant in spectacular sights. Its most important touristic places are the Crișul Alb Valley and the Canalul Morilor.
