= Mihai Beniuc =

Romanian socialist realist poet, dramatist, and novelist (1907–1988)

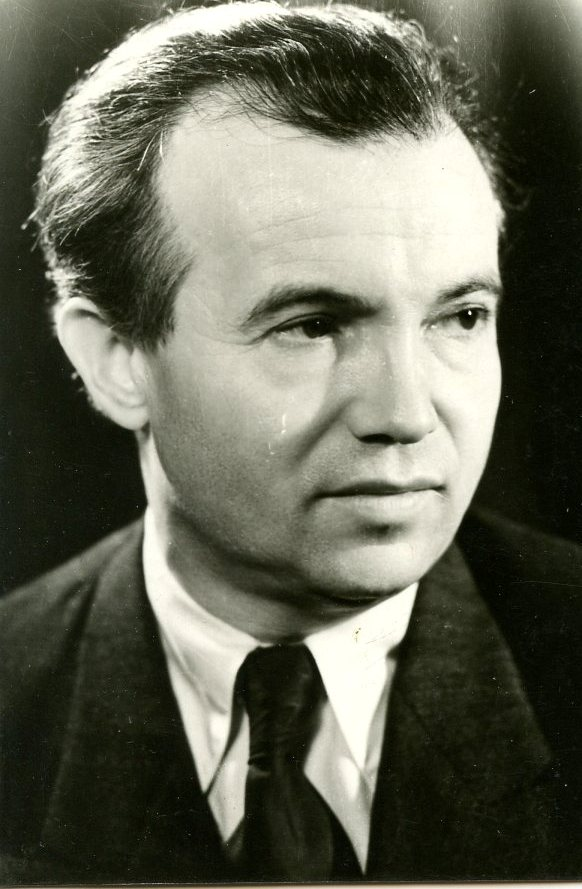
- Born: November 20, 1907; Sebiș, Arad County, Austria-Hungary
- Died: June 24, 1988 (aged 80); Bucharest, Socialist Republic of Romania
- Resting place: Evangelical Lutheran Cemetery
- Education: University of Cluj
- Occupations: poet, dramatist, novelist

Mihai Beniuc (Romanian pronunciation: [miˈhaj beˈnjuk]; 20 November 1907 – 24 June 1988) was a Romanian socialist realist poet, dramatist, and novelist.

== Biography ==
He was born in 1907 in Sebiș, Arad County (at the time in Austria-Hungary), the son of Athanasie and Vaseline Beniuc. He attended the Moise Nicoară High School in Arad, where he had Al. T. Stamatiad as literature teacher, and where he made his debut in the school's magazine, Laboremus. In 1931, he graduated from the University of Cluj, majoring in psychology, philosophy and sociology. He then enrolled as a masters student at the University of Hamburg, where he studied animal behaviour with Jakob Johann von Uexküll. His training was reflected in his writing, particularly in his novels. He joined the Faculty of Psychology at the University of Cluj, and moved to Sibiu after Northern Transylvania was annexed by Hungary in 1940, in the wake of the Second Vienna Award. During that time, he wrote several poetry volumes (Cântece de pierzanie (1938), Cântece noi (1940), Orașul pierdut (1943)), the latter one a poetic reverie after the city he had left, Cluj.

At the end of World War II, Beniuc went to Moscow as cultural adviser, where he published in 1946 the volume Un om așteaptă răsăritul. After two years he returned to Romania and settled in Bucharest. His 1951 volume, Cântec pentru tovarășul Gheorghiu-Dej (Song for Comrade Gheorghiu-Dej), had a great contribution to manufacturing a genuine cult of personality around Gheorghe Gheorghiu-Dej, the leader of the Romanian Workers’ Party. Beniuc was the President of the Writers' Union of Romania and, from 1955, a titular member of the Romanian Academy. After 1965, he became a professor at the University of Bucharest.

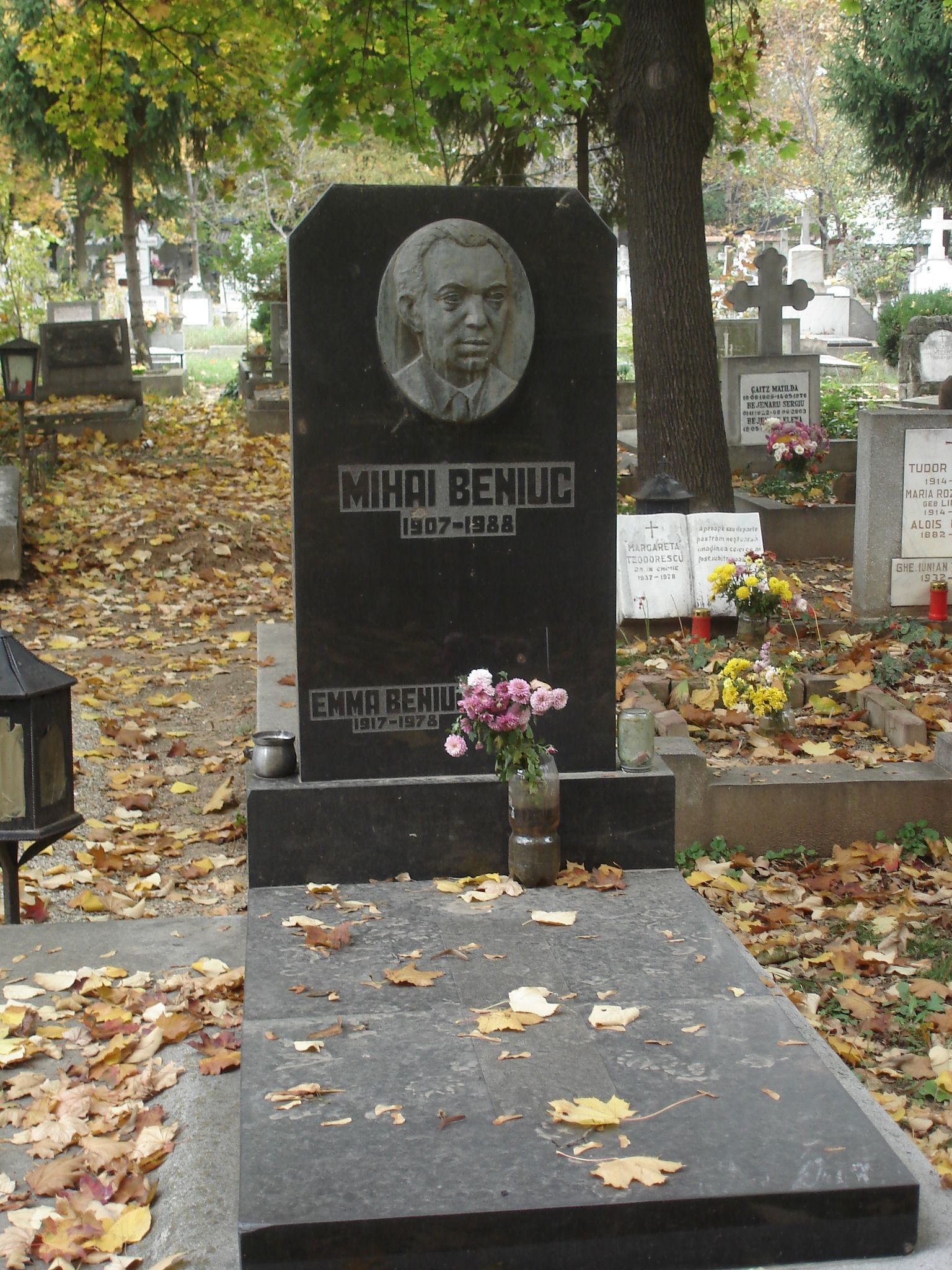
Mihai Beniuc's grave in Bucharest

He was awarded the Order of the Star of the Romanian Socialist Republic, and in 1978, the August 23 Order, 1st class. He died in 1988 in Bucharest, and is buried at the city's Evangelical Lutheran Cemetery.

== Selected works ==
=== Plays ===
- Cântece de pierzanie, 1938
- Cântece noi, 1943
- Orașul pierdut, 1943
- Un om așteaptă răsăritul, 1946
- Mărul de lângă drum, 1954
- Steaguri, 1951
- Cântec pentru tovarășul Gheorghiu-Dej, 1951
- Partidul m-a învățat, 1954
- Trăinicie, 1956
- Azimă, 1956
- Inima bătrînului Vezuv, 1957
- Cu un ceas mai devreme, 1959

=== Novels ===
- Pe muche de cuțit, 1959
- Dispariția unui om de rând, 1963
- Explozie înăbușită, 1971
