= Beliu (river) =

- Location within Romania

Location
- Country: Romania
- Counties: Arad County
- Villages: Clit, Comănești, Tăgădău, Beliu

Physical characteristics
- Mouth: Crișul Negru
  - coordinates: 46.7059°N 21.8223°E

Basin features
- Progression: Crișul Negru→ Körös→ Tisza→ Danube→ Black Sea

The Beliu (Hungarian: Béli-patak) is a left tributary of the river Crișul Negru in Romania. Formerly a right tributary of the Teuz, its flow is now diverted by a canal towards the Crișul Negru near Tăut, built in 1914–1919. Its length is 46 km (29 mi) and its basin size is 395 km^{2} (153 sq mi).

== Tributaries ==
The following rivers are tributaries to the Beliu (from source to mouth):

- Left: Hășmaș
- Right: Urviș, Botfei, Mideș, Mocirla, Sartiș, Renișel, Barcău, Frunziș
