= Urviș (river) =

- Location within Romania

Location
- Country: Romania
- Counties: Arad County
- Villages: Urvișu de Beliu

Physical characteristics
- Mouth: Beliu
  - coordinates: 46.5110°N 22.0754°E
- Length: 11 km (6.8 mi)
- Basin size: 20 km^{2} (7.7 sq mi)

Basin features
- Progression: Beliu→ Crișul Negru→ Körös→ Tisza→ Danube→ Black Sea

The Urviș is a right tributary of the river Beliu in Romania. It flows into the Beliu near the village Clit. Its length is 11 km (6.8 mi) and its basin size is 20 km^{2} (7.7 sq mi).
