= Hășmaș (river) =

- Location within Romania

Location
- Country: Romania
- Counties: Arad County
- Villages: Hășmaș

Physical characteristics
- Mouth: Beliu
  - location: Downstream of Hășmaș
  - coordinates: 46.5061°N 22.0546°E
- Length: 12 km (7.5 mi)
- Basin size: 16 km^{2} (6.2 sq mi)

Basin features
- Progression: Beliu→ Crișul Negru→ Körös→ Tisza→ Danube→ Black Sea

The Hășmaș is a left tributary of the river Beliu in Romania. It flows into the Beliu near the village Hășmaș. Its length is 12 km (7.5 mi) and its basin size is 16 km^{2} (6.2 sq mi).
