= Sebiș Solar Park =

Large thin-film photovoltaic

- Country: Romania
- Location: Sebiș, Arad County
- Coordinates: 46°26′N 22°07′E
- Status: Completed
- Commission date: 2013
- Construction cost: €100 million
- Owner: Promocion Inversolar 65

Solar farm
- Type: Flat-panel PV

Power generation
- Units operational: 317,000
- Nameplate capacity: 65 MW
- Annual net output: 91 GWh

Sebiș Solar Park is a large thin-film photovoltaic (PV) power system, built on a 200 ha (490 acres) plot of land located in Sebiș, Arad County, in western Romania.

The solar park has around 317,000 state-of-the-art thin film PV panels for a total nameplate capacity of 65-megawatts, and was completed in December 2013. The solar park was expected to supply around 91 GWh of electricity per year, enough to power some 100,000 average homes.

The investment cost for the Sebiș solar park amounted to some €100 million.

== See also ==
- Energy policy of the European Union
- Photovoltaics
- Renewable energy commercialization
- Renewable energy in the European Union
- Solar power in Romania
