= Valea Nouă (Teuz) =

- Location within Romania

Location
- Country: Romania
- Counties: Arad County
- Villages: Prunișor

Physical characteristics
- Mouth: Teuz
  - coordinates: 46.4015°N 22.0825°E
- Length: 12 km (7.5 mi)
- Basin size: 23 km^{2} (8.9 sq mi)

Basin features
- Progression: Teuz→ Crișul Negru→ Körös→ Tisza→ Danube→ Black Sea

The Valea Nouă is a right tributary of the river Teuz in Romania. It flows into the Teuz north of Bârsa. Its length is 12 km (7.5 mi) and its basin size is 23 km^{2} (8.9 sq mi).
