= Moneasa =

- Commune
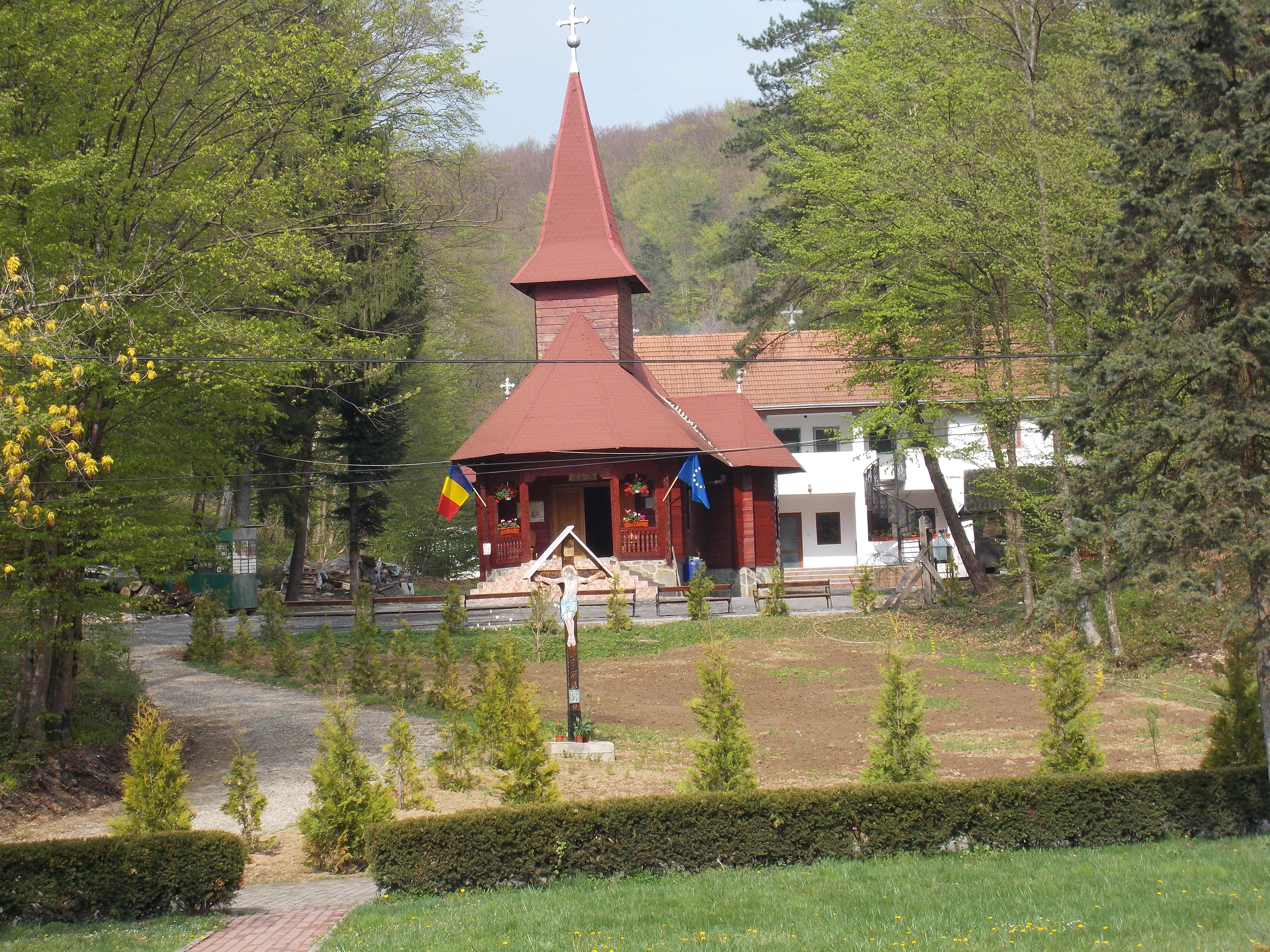
- The Moneasa skete

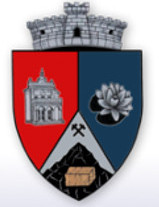
- Coat of arms

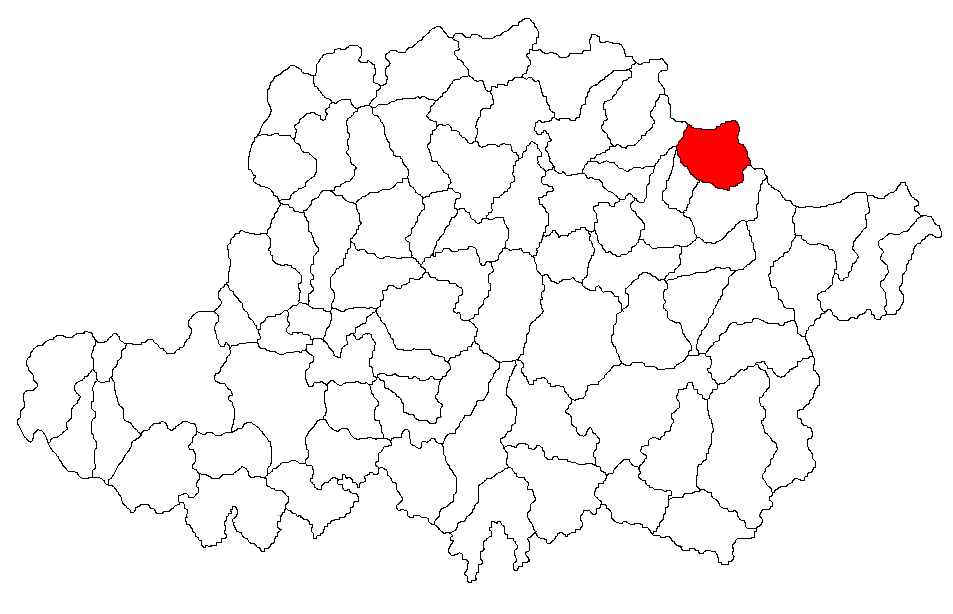
- Location in Arad County

- Location in Romania
- Coordinates: 46°27′N 22°15′E
- Country: Romania
- County: Arad

Government
  - Mayor (2020–2024): Ioan Nuțu Herbei (PSD)
- Area: 68.24 km^{2} (26.35 sq mi)
- Elevation: 290 m (950 ft)
- Population (2021-12-01): 738
  - Density: 10.8/km^{2} (28.0/sq mi)
- Time zone: UTC+02:00 (EET)
  - Summer (DST): UTC+03:00 (EEST)
- Postal code: 317220
- Area code: (+40) 02 57
- Vehicle reg.: AR
- Website: primariamoneasa.ro

Moneasa (Hungarian: Menyháza) is a commune in Arad County, Romania. Its administrative surface stretches over 6,824 hectares (16,860 acres) and it is composed of two villages, Moneasa and Rănușa (Kisróna).

== Geography ==
The commune is located in the northeastern part of Arad County, on the border with Bihor County. It lies on the banks of the Moneasa River, at the foot of the Codru-Moma Mountains. The nearest town is Sebiș, 21 km (13 mi) to the southwest; the county seat, Arad, is 102 km (63 mi) away.

== Population ==
According to the 2002 census, the population of the commune counts 1,056 inhabitants, out of which 97.7% are Romanians, 1.7% are Hungarians and 0.6% are of other or undeclared nationalities.

== History ==
Traces of inhabitance on this area dating back to the Paleolithic and Neolithic have been found in the caverns called "Hoanca" and "Izoi".

The first documentary record of Moneasa dates back to 1597, while Rănușa was first mentioned in 1556.

== Economy ==
Moneasa is one of the county's communes that have a high economic potential. The exploitation of black and red marble, the springs of mineral waters with bicarbonate (calcic, sodic, oligomineral, and semi-thermal), valorized already in 1866, lumbering and conversion of timber, as well as the exploitation of other touristic resources are the mainstays of the local economy.

== Tourism ==
The commune's primary touristic place is the Moneasa health resort. It is working all year round and it is recommended for treatment of different diseases, mainly rheumatic ones, as well as digestive and gynaecological troubles.

The cavern named "Valea Morii", a natural reservation of national interest, along with the one called "Liliecilor", the water fall "Boroaia", the "Momuța" peak and the ruins of the blast furnace are the top sights of the commune.
