= Cărand =

- Commune
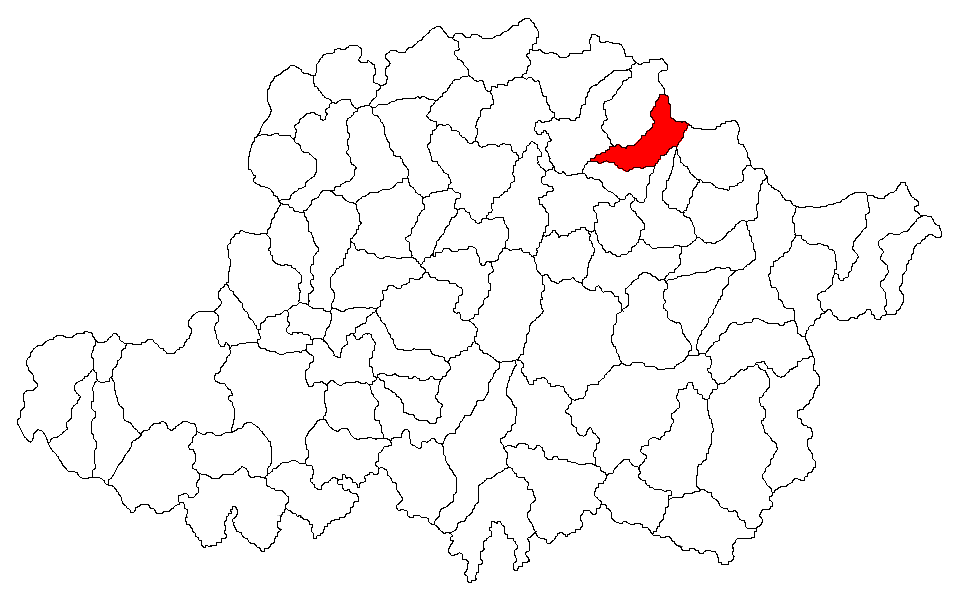
- Location in Arad County

- Location in Romania
- Coordinates: 46°27′N 22°5′E
- Country: Romania
- County: Arad
- Population (2021-12-01): 1,017
- Time zone: EET/EEST (UTC+2/+3)
- Vehicle reg.: AR

Cărand (Hungarian: Hévízkáránd) is a commune in Arad County, Romania. Cărand commune is situated in the northern part of the Sebiș Basin, at the foot of Codru-Moma Mountains and its surface is 3813 ha. It is composed of two villages, Cărand (situated at 92 km from Arad) and Seliștea (Bélmárkaszék).

== Population ==
According to the last census, the population of the commune counts 1320 inhabitants, out of which 89.5% are Romanians, 0.2% Hungarians, 9.4% Roms, 0.7% Slovaks and 0.2% are of other or undeclared nationalities.

== History ==
The first documentary record of the locality Cărand dates back to 1429, while Seliștea was documentary mentioned in 1552.

== Economy ==
Although the economy of the commune is prevalent agricultural, the secondary and tertiary economic sectors have also developed recently.

== Tourism ==
The natural reservations called Pădurea Sic having a 17,8 ha surface and the oak forest stretching on 2,1 ha, as well as the thermal water springs are the main touristic sights of the commune.
