= Valea Nouă Chișer =

Chișer
- Location within Romania

Location
- Country: Romania
- Counties: Arad County
- Villages: Cintei

Physical characteristics
- Mouth: Crișul Alb
  - location: Chișineu-Criș
  - coordinates: 46.5069°N 21.5304°E
- Length: 15 km (9.3 mi)
- Basin size: 46 km^{2} (18 sq mi)

Basin features
- Progression: Crișul Alb→ Körös→ Tisza→ Danube→ Black Sea
- Tributaries
  - left: Veljul Selișteoara

The Valea Nouă Chișer is a small river in Arad County, Romania, a left tributary of the river Crișul Alb. It is the former lower course of the river Chișer, which now discharges into the Canalul Morilor. It flows into the Crișul Alb in Chișineu-Criș. Its length is 15 km (9.3 mi) and its basin size is 46 km^{2} (18 sq mi).
