= Budieru =

- Location within Romania

Location
- Country: Romania
- Counties: Arad County
- Villages: Grăniceri

Physical characteristics
- Mouth: Canalul Morilor
  - coordinates: 46.5340°N 21.3607°E
- Length: 24 km (15 mi)
- Basin size: 167 km^{2} (64 sq mi)

Basin features
- Progression: Canalul Morilor→ Crișul Alb→ Körös→ Tisza→ Danube→ Black Sea

The Budieru is a river in Arad County, western Romania. Formerly a left tributary of the river Crișul Alb, it presently flows into the Canalul Morilor, which discharges into the Crișul Alb. The river is mostly channelized and is integrated into the drainage system of the area. Its length is 24 km (15 mi) and its basin size is 167 km^{2} (64 sq mi).

== Hydronymy ==
The Hungarian name of the river (Büdos Ér) means "lazy brook". The Romanian name derives from that.
