= Craiva =

- Commune
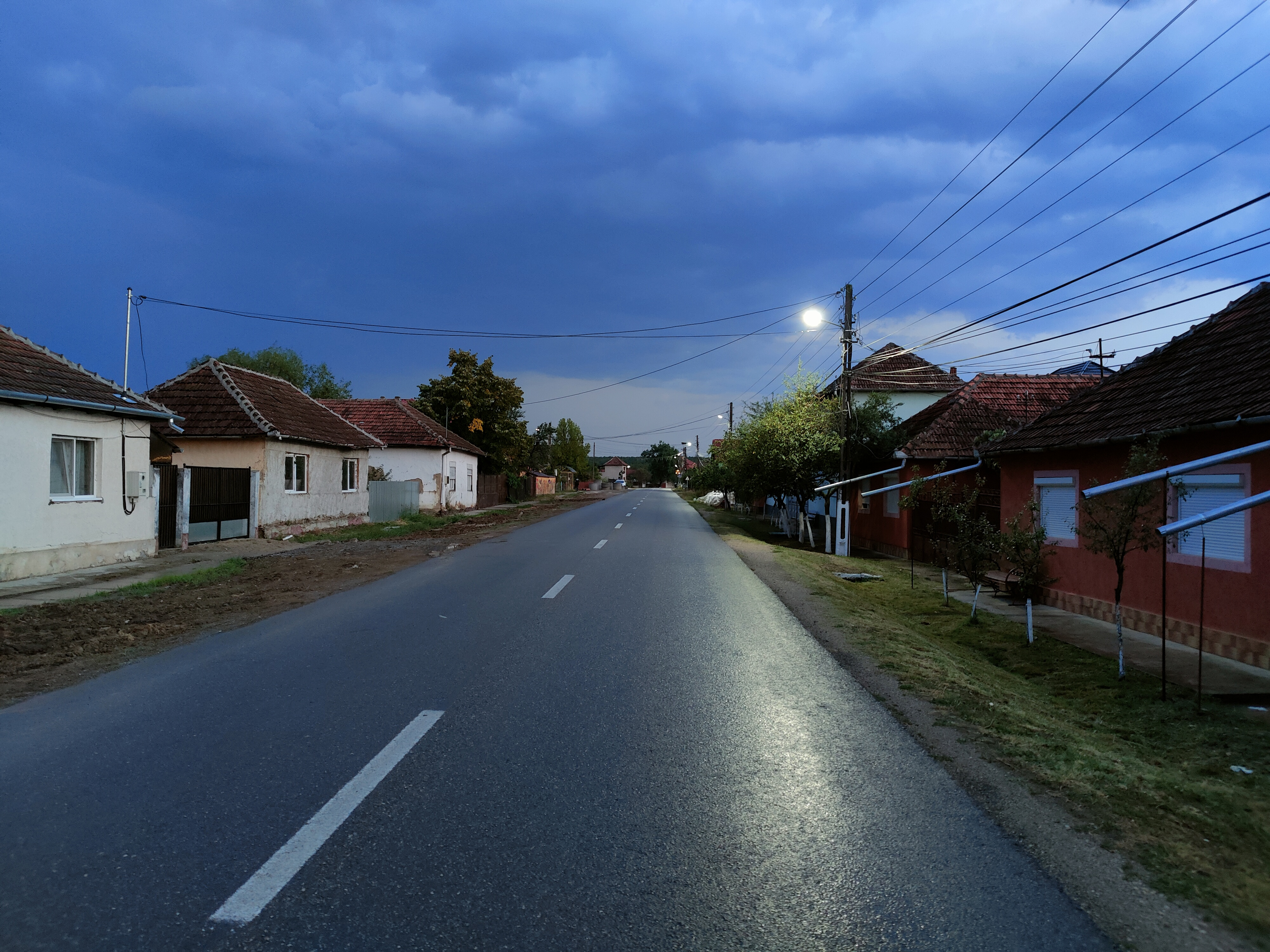

- Location in Romania
- Coordinates: 46°34′59″N 21°58′31″E
- Country: Romania
- County: Arad
- Population (2021-12-01): 2,619
- Time zone: UTC+02:00 (EET)
  - Summer (DST): UTC+03:00 (EEST)
- Vehicle reg.: AR

Craiva (Hungarian: Bélkirálymező) is a commune in Arad County, Romania. The commune Craiva is situated in the contact zone of the Susag's high plateau with Mărăuș Hills and Codru-Moma Mountains, along the river Sartiș, having an administrative territory of 11,490 hectares. It is composed of ten villages: Chișlaca (Kislaka), Ciuntești (Csontaháza), Coroi (Bélkaroly), Craiva (situated at 85 km from Arad), Mărăuș (Bélnagymaros), Rogoz de Beliu (Bélrogoz), Stoinești (Bélkismaros), Susag (Pusztaszuszág), Șiad (Sajád) and Tălmaci (Bántolmács).

== Population ==
According to the last census, the population of the commune counts 2880 inhabitants, out of which 81.77% are Romanians, 10.93% Roma, 1.18% Ukrainians and 6.04% are of other or undeclared nationalities.

== History ==
Craiva's first documentary record dates from 1344. Chișlaca, Coroi, Mărăuș, Stoinești, Susag and Tălmaci were first mentioned in 1828, Ciuntești in 1587, Rogoz de Beliu in 1552 and Șiad in 1344.

== Economy ==
Although the economy of the commune is prevalent agricultural the secondary and tertiary economic sectors have also developed recently. Possessing a forest-land stretching over 4000 ha, the activities connected to lumbering and procession of timber are well represented in the local economy.

== Tourism ==
The picturesque scenery of the Mărăuș Valley, the Gârbei Peak and the wooden church in Ciuntești called "Buna Vestire" dating from 1725 and painted its interior in Byzantine style, the pictures being painted on canvas or lime and glued on the plank walls are the most important attractions of the commune.
