= Canalul Morilor =

Canal in Romania

Specifications
- Length: 92 km (57 mi)

Geography
- Start point: Crișul Alb at Berindia, Romania
- End point: Crișul Alb at Vărșand, Romania
- Beginning coordinates: 46.3139°N 22.1456°E
- Ending coordinates: 46.6167°N 21.3546°E

The Canalul Morilor is a canal in the lowland area south of the river Crișul Alb in Arad County, western Romania. Constructed in the 19th century for water-mills, it is now used for irrigation. It takes water from the Crișul Alb near Berindia, flows more or less parallel to the Crișul Alb towards the west and discharges into the Crișul Alb in Vărșand. It is 92 km (57 mi) long. It passes through the communes Buteni, Bârsa, Bocsig, Ineu, Seleuș, Zărand, Olari, Chișineu-Criș, Socodor and Pilu. It intercepts several former left tributaries of the Crișul Alb, including Chișer, Rât and Budieru.
