= Olari, Arad =

Olari Varsánd
- Commune
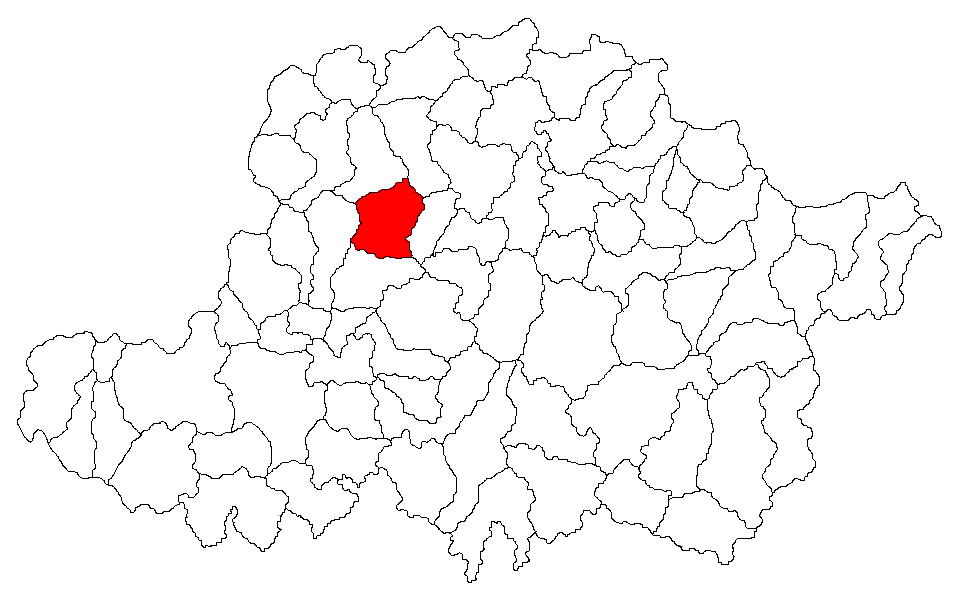
- Location in Arad County

- Location in Romania
- Coordinates: 46°23′N 21°33′E
- Country: Romania
- County: Arad
- Population (2021-12-01): 1,903
- Time zone: EET/EEST (UTC+2/+3)
- Vehicle reg.: AR

Olari (Hungarian: Varsánd) is a commune in Arad County, Romania, is situated on the Arad Plateau, on the Canalul Morilor of the river Crișul Alb. Its surface occupies 4767 ha. It is composed of two villages, Olari (situated at 35 km (22 mi) from Arad) and Sintea Mică (Szineke).

== Population ==
According to the last census, the population of the commune counts 1942 inhabitants, out of which 52.2% are Romanians, 33.2% Hungarians, 8.0% Romanis, 5.2% Slovaks and 1.4% are of other or undeclared nationalities.

== Natives ==
- Iosif Rangheț

== History ==
The first documentary record of Olari dates back to 1746, while Sintea Mică was first mentioned in 1467.

== Economy ==
The economy of the commune is mainly agrarian, based on growing of grain and technical crops, as well as vegetable growing.

== Tourism ==
Being situated on a flat zone, the commune is lacking in attractive spectacles. Nevertheless, through trimming up the springs of thermal and medicinal waters, it could become a well-attended touristic place.
