= Jichișu de Jos =

- Commune
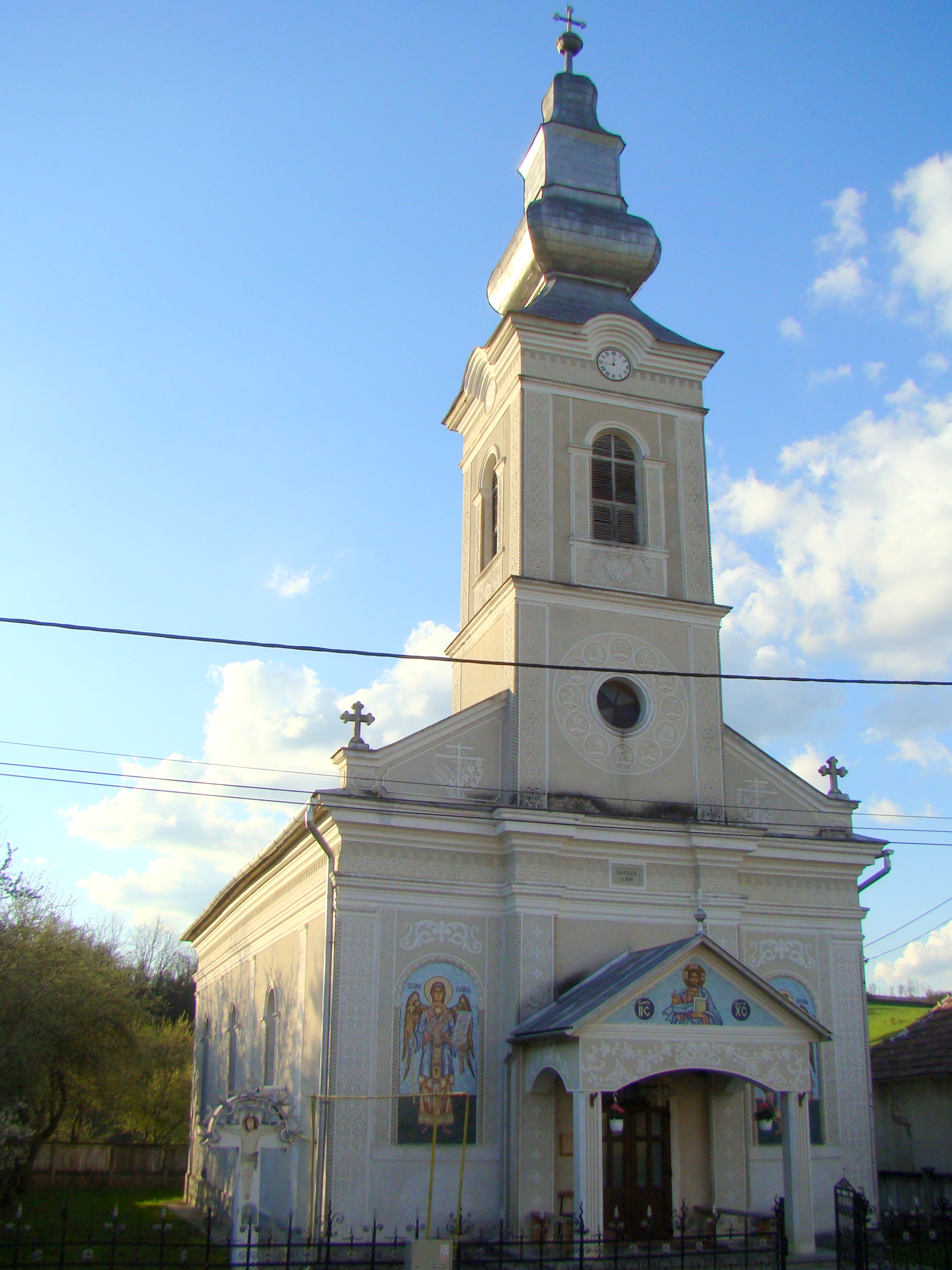
- Archangels' church in Jichișu de Jos

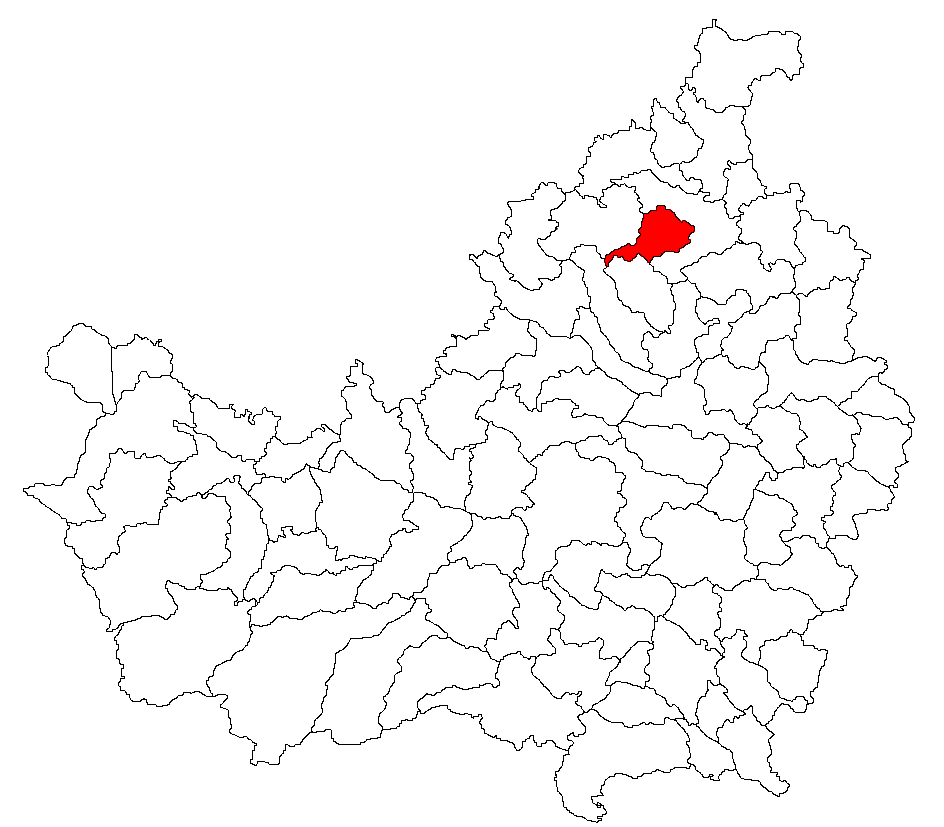
- Location in Cluj County

- Location in Romania
- Coordinates: 47°08′06″N 23°48′11″E
- Country: Romania
- County: Cluj
- Established: 1292
- Subdivisions: Codor, Jichișu de Jos, Jichișu de Sus, Șigău

Government
  - Mayor (2020–2024): Ioan Moncea (PNL)
- Area: 43.26 km^{2} (16.70 sq mi)
- Elevation: 322 m (1,056 ft)
- Population (2021-12-01): 1,049
  - Density: 24.25/km^{2} (62.80/sq mi)
- Time zone: UTC+02:00 (EET)
  - Summer (DST): UTC+03:00 (EEST)
- Postal code: 407345
- Area code: +(40) x64
- Vehicle reg.: CJ
- Website: www.comunajichisudejos.ro

Jichișu de Jos (Hungarian: Alsógyékényes; German: Unterrohrbach) is a commune in Cluj County, Transylvania, Romania. It is composed of five villages: Codor (Kodor), Jichișu de Jos, Jichișu de Sus (Felsőgyékényes), Șigău (Sajgó), and Tărpiu (Szekerestörpény).

The commune is situated in the northwestern part of the Transylvanian Plateau, at an altitude of 322 m (1,056 ft), on the banks of the river Salca. It is located in northern Cluj County, just west of the city of Dej and 60 km (37 mi) north of the county seat, Cluj-Napoca.

== Demographics ==
According to the census from 2002 there was a total population of 1,327 people living in this commune; of this population, 99.54% were ethnic Romanians, 0.30% ethnic Roma, and 0.15% ethnic Hungarians. At the 2011 census, the population had decreased to 1,152, with 98.18% being Romanians. At the 2021 census, Jichișu de Jos had a population of 1,049; of those, 92.85% were Romanians.

== Natives ==
- Ștefan Cicio Pop (1865 – 1934), politician
