= Mișca =

Mișca Tőzmiske
- Commune
- Location in Romania
- Coordinates: 46.6°N 21.6°E
- Country: Romania
- County: Arad
- Population (2021-12-01): 3,689
- Time zone: EET/EEST (UTC+2/+3)
- Vehicle reg.: AR

Mișca (Hungarian: Tőzmiske) is a commune in Arad County, Romania, in the northern part of the Crișurilor Plateau, in the Teuz valley. Its surface is 1088 ha.

== Administration ==
The commune is composed of four villages:

In Romanian	In Hungarian	Ethnic majority
Mișca	Tőzmiske	Romanians
Satu Nou	Simonyifalva	Hungarians
Vânători	Vadász	Roma
Zerindu Mic	Bélzerénd	Hungarians

== Population ==
According to the 2011 census, the population of the commune is 3588, of whom 36.6% are Romanians, 36.6% Hungarians, 24.7% Roma, 1.3% Germans and 0.2% are of other or undeclared nationalities.

== History ==
In Zerindu Mic traces of a settlement from the 2nd Iron Age have been found. The first documentary record of Mișca dates back to 1249. Zerindu Mic was attested documentarily in 1326, Satu Nou in 1828, while Vânători in 1214.

== Economy ==
Although the economy of the commune is mainly agrarian, small industry, commerce and services underwent a significant development in the last few years.

== Tourism ==
The valleys of the rivers Crișul Negru, Teuz and Sartiș are much-liked places of the anglers and hunters, due to their rich fauna. Besides, the reformed church in Vînători-architectural monument dating back to the 13th century, the Catholic Church in Satul Nou and the orthodox church in Mișca are the most attended sights of the commune.
