= Dezna =

- Commune
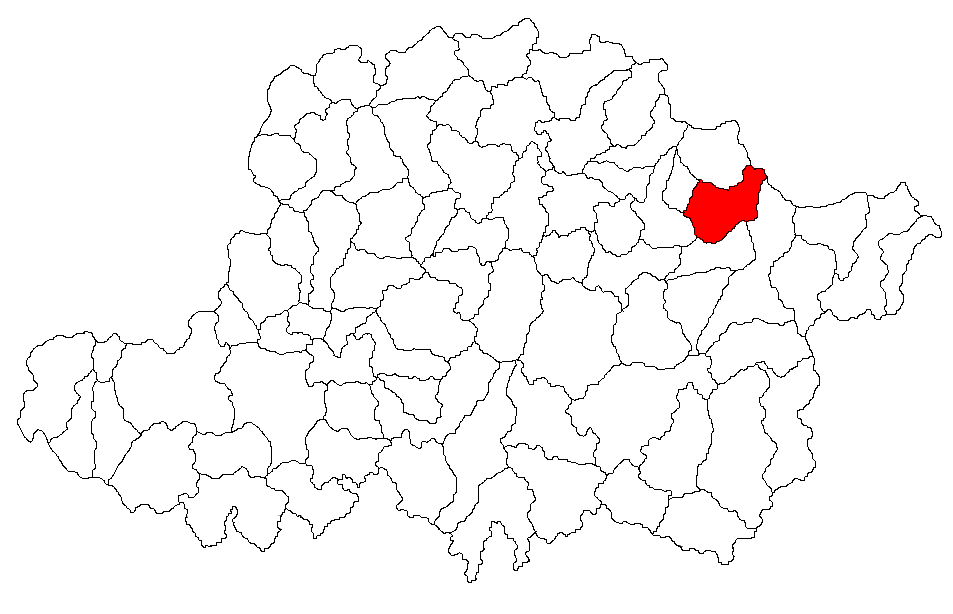
- Location in Arad County

- Location in Romania
- Coordinates: 46°24′N 22°15′E
- Country: Romania
- County: Arad
- Population (2021-12-01): 999
- Time zone: EET/EEST (UTC+2/+3)
- Vehicle reg.: AR

Dezna (Hungarian: Dézna) is a commune in Arad County, Romania. Located in the valley of the river Dezna about 7 km from Sebiș, it is composed of five villages: Buhani (Bajnokfalva), Dezna, Laz (Déznaláz), Neagra (Kisfeketefalu) and Slatina de Criș (Mikószlatina).

== Population ==
According to the 2002, the population of the commune was 1523 inhabitants, out of which 98.2% are Romanians, 0.6% Hungarians, 0.7% Roma and 0.5% are of other or undeclared nationalities.

== History ==
The first documentary record of Dezna dates back to 1318. Buhani was attested documentarily in 1441, Laz between 1553- 1561, while Neagra and Slatina de Criș in 1553.

== Economy ==
The economy of the commune is mainly agricultural, farming, livestock-breeding and conversion of timber are well represented.
