= Olcea =

- Commune
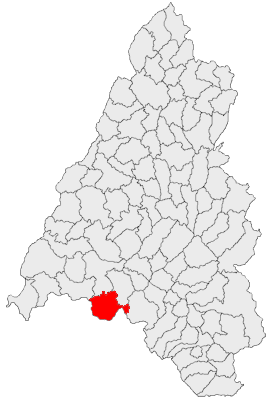
- Location in Bihor County

- Location in Romania
- Coordinates: 46°41′N 21°59′E
- Country: Romania
- County: Bihor

Government
  - Mayor (2020–2024): Flore Bocșe (PNL)
- Area: 42.94 km^{2} (16.58 sq mi)
- Elevation: 168 m (551 ft)
- Population (2021-12-01): 2,583
  - Density: 60/km^{2} (160/sq mi)
- Time zone: EET/EEST (UTC+2/+3)
- Postal code: 417355
- Area code: +(40) x59
- Vehicle reg.: BH
- Website: comunaolcea.ro

Olcea (Hungarian: Olcsa) is a commune in Bihor County, Crișana, Romania with a population of 2,583 people as of 2021. It is composed of four villages: Călacea (Bélkalocsa), Hodișel (Pusztahodos), Olcea, and Ucuriș (Ökrös).
