= Archiș =

- Commune
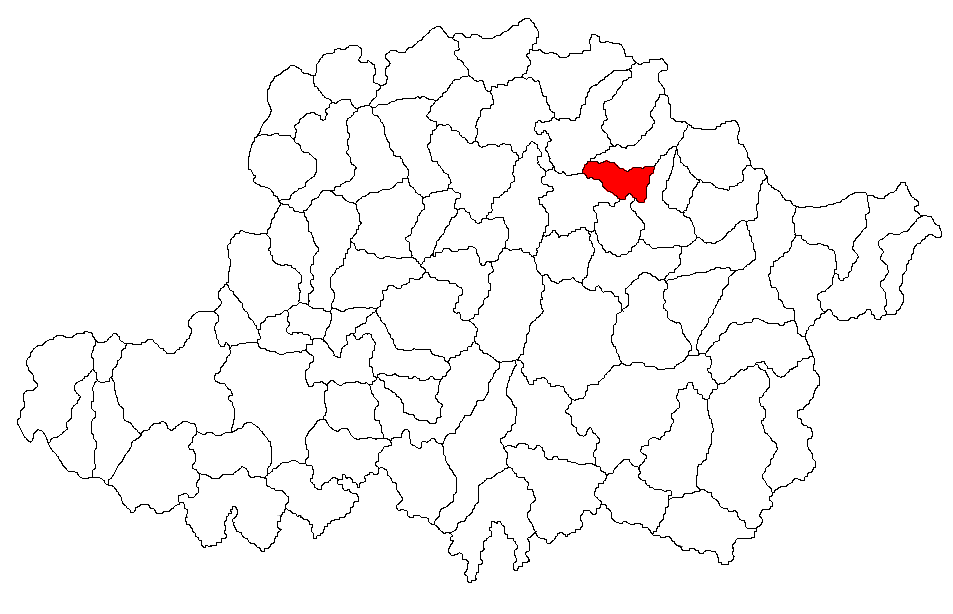
- Location in Arad County

- Location in Romania
- Coordinates: 46°28′59″N 22°3′0″E
- Country: Romania
- County: Arad
- Population (2021-12-01): 1,333
- Time zone: EET/EEST (UTC+2/+3)
- Vehicle reg.: AR

Archiș (Hungarian: Bélárkos) is a commune in Arad County, Romania. It is situated in the northern part of the Sebiș Basin, at the foot of the Codru Moma Mountains, and its surface is 68.07 km^{2}. It is composed of four villages: Archiș (situated at 84 km from Arad), Bârzești (Barzafalva), Groșeni (Tönköd) and Nermiș (Nermegy).

== Population ==
According to the 2002 census, the population of the commune is 1699. Ethnically, it has the following structure: 94.9% are Romanians, 0.2% Hungarians, 4.4% Roma and 0.5% are of other or undeclared nationalities.

== History ==
The first documentary record of Archiș dates back to 1552. Bârzești, Groșeni and Nermiș were mentioned in documents in 1580.

== Economy ==
Although the economy of the commune is mainly agricultural, the secondary and tertiary economic sectors have also developed since the 1990s.

== Tourism ==
Among the commune's tourist attractions are the landscape at the western edge of Codru-Moma Mountains and the church of Pious Paraschiva (1725).
