= Sebiș =

- Town
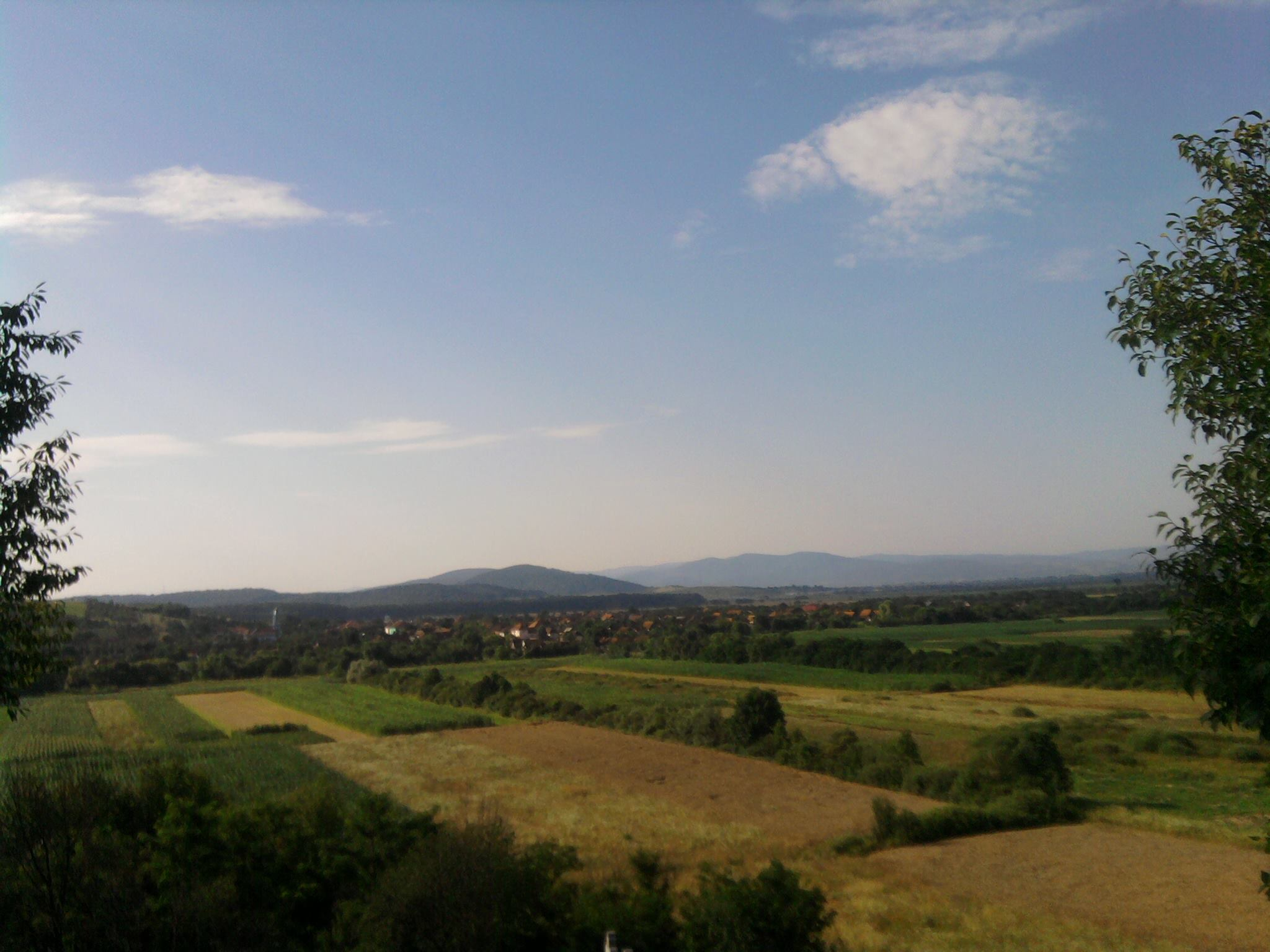
- View of Prunișor

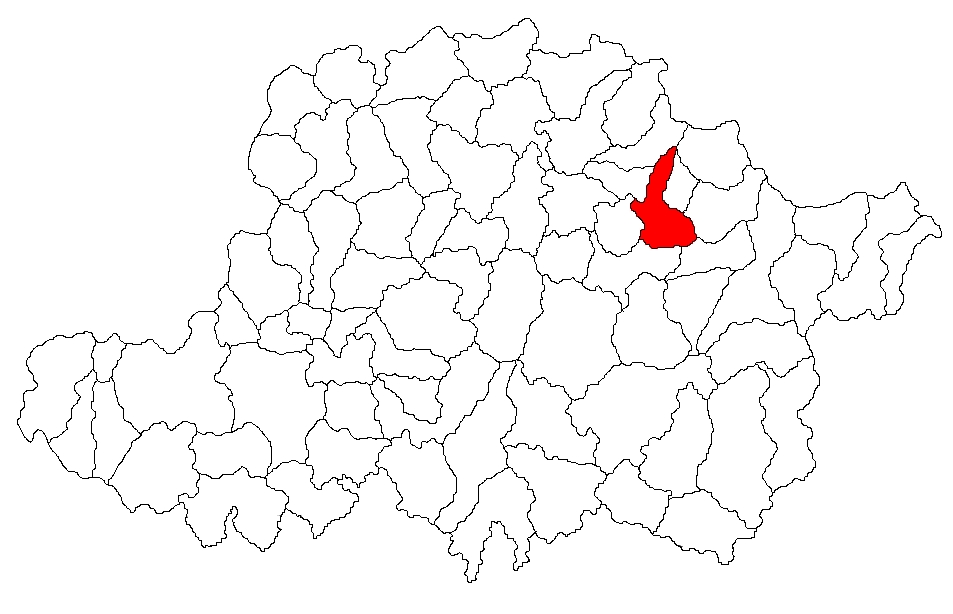
- Location in Arad County

- Location in Romania
- Coordinates: 46°22′22″N 22°7′46″E
- Country: Romania
- County: Arad

Government
  - Mayor (2024–2028): Cristian Feieș (PNL)
- Area: 65.94 km^{2} (25.46 sq mi)
- Elevation: 157 m (515 ft)
- Population (2021-12-01): 5,410
  - Density: 82.0/km^{2} (212/sq mi)
- Time zone: UTC+02:00 (EET)
  - Summer (DST): UTC+03:00 (EEST)
- Postal code: 315700
- Area code: (+40) 02 57
- Vehicle reg.: AR
- Website: www.primariasebis.ro

Sebiș (Hungarian: Borossebes) is a town in Arad County, western Transylvania, Romania. Situated 82 km (51 mi) from the county capital, Sebiș is one of the most important urban centres in the Crișul Alb valley. It administers three villages: Donceni (Dancsfalva), Prunișor (Kertes), and Sălăjeni (Szelezsény).

== Geography ==
The town lies on the banks of the river Sebiș and its tributaries, the Laz and the Minezel. Its territory occupies 61.81 km^{2} (23.86 sq mi) in the greater Sebiș Basin, which is a sub-unit of the Crișul Alb Basin.

== Demographics ==
Historical population
| Year | Pop. | ±% |
|---|---|---|
| 1977 | 6,070 | — |
| 1992 | 6,993 | +15.2% |
| 2002 | 6,829 | −2.3% |
| 2011 | 5,831 | −14.6% |
| 2021 | 5,410 | −7.2% |
Source: Census data

At the 2021 census, Sebiș had a population of 5,410. At the 2011 census, the town had 5,831 inhabitants, of which 90.53% were Romanians, 6.68% Roma, 2.31% Hungarians, and 0,1% were of other or undeclared ethnicities.

== History ==
The first documentary mention of the locality dates back to the year 1552, while later, in 1746 Sebiș had a market status (opidum Sebes). Donceni was registered in 1439, Prunișor in 1406 and Sălăjeni in 1574.

Until the end of the 18th century Sebiș had been under Ottoman occupation and later under Habsburg administration. During the latter period the settlement had undergone an accentuated development.

== Economy ==
The Sebiș Solar Park, completed in December 2013, has about 317,000 state-of-the-art thin film photovoltaic panels, for a total nameplate capacity of 65 megawatts. This is the largest photovoltaic power station in Romania, built at a cost of €100 million.

== Tourism ==
For the tourists Sebiș is the point of departure towards the superior course of the Crișul Alb River, towards the thermal bath in Moneasa and towards the peaks of the Codru-Moma Mountains.

== Natives ==
- Mihai Beniuc (1907–1988), socialist realist poet, dramatist, and novelist
