= Ignești =

- Commune
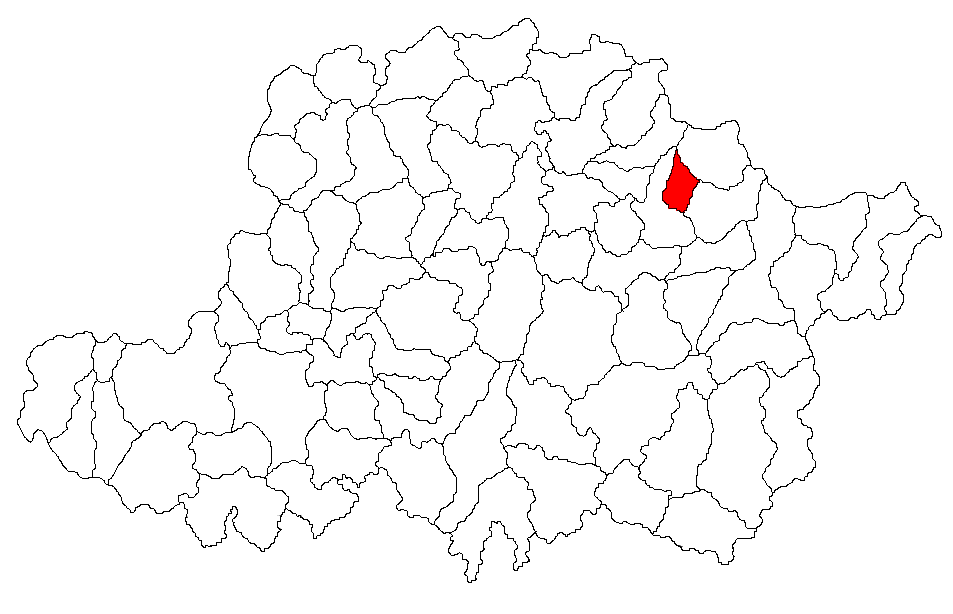
- Location in Arad County

- Location in Romania
- Coordinates: 46°24′N 22°10′E
- Country: Romania
- County: Arad
- Population (2021-12-01): 601
- Time zone: EET/EEST (UTC+2/+3)
- Vehicle reg.: AR

Ignești (Hungarian: Ignafalva) is a commune in Arad County, Romania, is situated at the southern foot of Codru-Moma Mountains, in the Ineu-Gurahonț Basin. The commune stretches over 5192 hectares and is composed of four villages: Ignești (situated at 89 km from Arad), Minead (Menyéd), Nădălbești (Nádalmás) and Susani (Susányfalva).

== Population ==
According to the 2002 census the population of the commune counts 822 inhabitants, out of which 99.4% are Romanians and 0.6% are Hungarians.

== Istoric ==
The first documentary record of the locality Ignești dates back to 1553. The other settlements were attested documentary as it follows: Minead in 1619, Nadalbești in 1553 and Susani in 1574.

== Economy ==
The economy of the commune is mainly agricultural, livestock-breeding and plant-growing being well represented. Apiculture is also present on the economic map of the commune.

== Tourism ==
Ignești commune can become an area with touristic attraction by trimming up its anthropic and natural potential.
