= Apateu =

- Commune
- Location in Romania
- Coordinates: 46°37′18″N 21°46′26″E
- Country: Romania
- County: Arad
- Population (2021-12-01): 3,129
- Time zone: EET/EEST (UTC+2/+3)
- Vehicle reg.: AR

Apateu (Hungarian: Apáti) is a commune in Arad County, Romania. The commune is situated in the Crișurilor Plateau and is composed of three villages: Apateu (situated at 77 km from Arad), Berechiu (Alsóbarakony) and Moțiori. The nearest city is Ineu at 35 km. Its total administrative territory is 7610 ha.

== Climate ==
Apateu has a humid continental climate, with cold and snowy winters and hot summers.

== Population ==
According to the last census the population of the commune counts 3684 inhabitants. From an ethnical point of view it has the following structure: 94,8% are Romanians, 0,2% Hungarians, 4,9% Roms and 0,1% are of other or undeclared nationalities.

== History ==
In the south west area and on the actual spot of the village it was founded traces from the late neolithic period, such as tools of stone like: small flat chisel, axes and fragments of pottery. In the north-east was found evidence of activities from the Bronze Age, such as: two sickle, various jewelry and a button. The items are kept in the village museum ”Rovina”, and in the County Museum of Arad. In the period of antiquity the place was lived in by Dacians, the region being included in the kingdom of Dacia ruled by king Burebista. Evidence such as coins of silver from the period 229-59 b. Hr. was found. After the Roman occupation of the Dacia, the region remained unoccupied and uninhabited of the tribes of the free Dacians. The first documentary record of the locality Apateu dates back to 1219, when Apateu is mentioned in Latin as ”Vila Apati”, meaning the village of the monastery. Actually ”Apaty” derives from the basic Latin form of ”abbatus”, meaning abbot. The village belonged to a monastery. Berechiu was mentioned in documents in 1332, while Moțiori only in 1956.

== Economy ==
Although the economy of the commune is mainly agricultural, the secondary and tertiary economic sectors have also developed recently.
