= Beliu =

- Commune
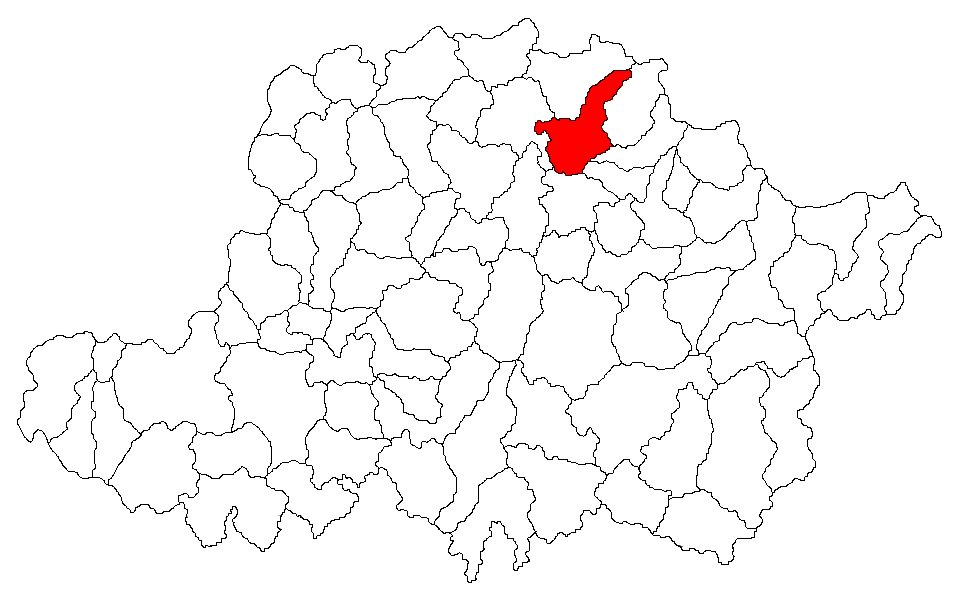
- Location in Arad County

- Location in Romania
- Coordinates: 46°29′N 21°59′E
- Country: Romania
- County: Arad
- Area: 36.95 km^{2} (14.27 sq mi)
- Population (2021-12-01): 2,936
  - Density: 79/km^{2} (210/sq mi)
- Time zone: EET/EEST (UTC+2/+3)
- Vehicle reg.: AR

Beliu (Hungarian: Bél) is a commune in Arad County, Romania. Beliu commune lies in the contact zone of Teuz Plateau with Mărăuș Hills, along the river Beliu. It is composed of six villages: Beliu (situated at 77 km from Arad), Benești (Benyefalva), Bochia (Boklya), Vasile Goldiș (Lunca Teuzului until 2005, and until 1968 a separate commune called Mocirla; Bélmocsolya), Secaci (Felsőszakács) and Tăgădău (Tagadómedgyes). Its territory is 3,695 ha (9,130 acres).

== Population ==
According to the 2011 census, the population of the commune counts 3,320 inhabitants, out of which 90.9% are Romanians, 2.2% Hungarians, 4.4% Roma, 2.4% Ukrainians, and 0.1% are of other or undeclared nationalities.

== History ==
The first documentary record of the locality Beliu dates back to 1332. Benești was documentary recorded in 1828, Bochia in 1552, Lunca Teuzului (Vasile Goldiș) in 1588, Secaci in 1580, and Tăgădău in 1552.

== Economy ==
Although the economy of the commune is prevalent agricultural, the secondary and tertiary economic sectors have also developed recently. Besides agriculture, the industry of building materials, light industry, timber industry and at last but not at least small industry represented by the craftsmen's activity have a significant proportion in the commune's economy.

== Tourism ==
The Emil Lăzureanu Museum in Beliu with its collections of glass-work, ceramic, textile and wooden objects, popular costumes, archaeological, historical and nature science works, as well as the wooden church of Secaci, built in 1725 with its collection of glass icons are the most valuable touristic sights of the commune.

== Natives ==
- Vasile Goldiș (1862–1934), politician, social theorist, and member of the Romanian Academy
- Nicolae Pantea (born 1946), Romanian international footballer
