= Hășmaș =

- Commune
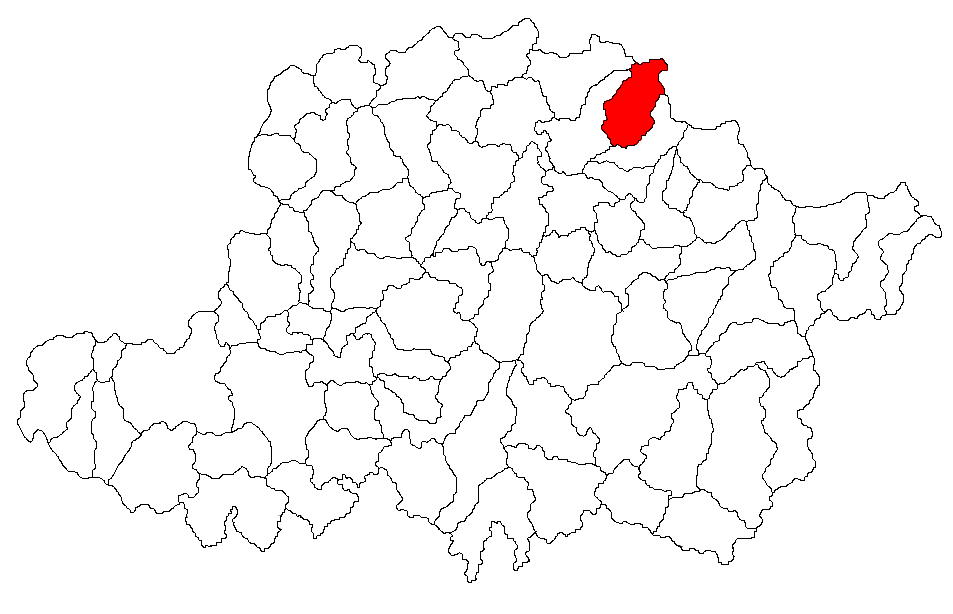
- Location in Arad County

- Location in Romania
- Coordinates: 46°30′N 22°08′E
- Country: Romania
- County: Arad
- Population (2021-12-01): 1,130
- Time zone: EET/EEST (UTC+2/+3)
- Vehicle reg.: AR

Hășmaș (Hungarian: Bélhagymás) is a commune in Arad County, Crișana, Romania.

Hășmaș lies in the northern part of the Ineu Basin, at the contact zone of Cărand Hills with Mărăuș Hills and Codru-Moma Mountains, along the river Hășmaș. Its surface is 8,844 hectares. It is composed of six villages: Agrișu Mic (Bélegregy), Botfei (Botfej), Clit (Pusztaklit), Comănești (Kománfalva), Hășmaș (situated at 87 km from Arad) and Urvișu de Beliu (Bélörvényes).

== Population ==
According to the 2002 census, the population of the commune counts 1460 inhabitants, out of which 96.2% are Romanians, 3.6% Roma and 0.2% are of other or undeclared nationalities.

== History ==
In 1968 traces of a Dacian reinforced settlement, as well as ceramic pots made on disk or by hand, iron tools and arms, ornaments etc. dating from the 1st century BC and the 1st century AD were found in Clit.

The first documentary record of Hășmaș dates back to 1588. Agrișu Mic was attested documentarily in 1588, Botfei in 1595, Clit in 1828, while Comănești and Urvișu de Beliu in 1599.

== Economy ==
The economy of the commune is mainly agrarian, the population lives on livestock-breeding, grain growing and pomiculture. Besides, lumbering and conversion of timber are also present on the economic map of the commune.

== Tourism ==
The wooden church in Agrișu Mic dating from the 18th century is the main sight of the commune however the stock of game, the shooting lodges and the fishing places are also well-graced attractions.

In 1968, the remains of an ancient Dacian fortress, used for defence between 1st century BC and 1st century AD, were discovered in Clit village.
