= Cermei =

- Commune
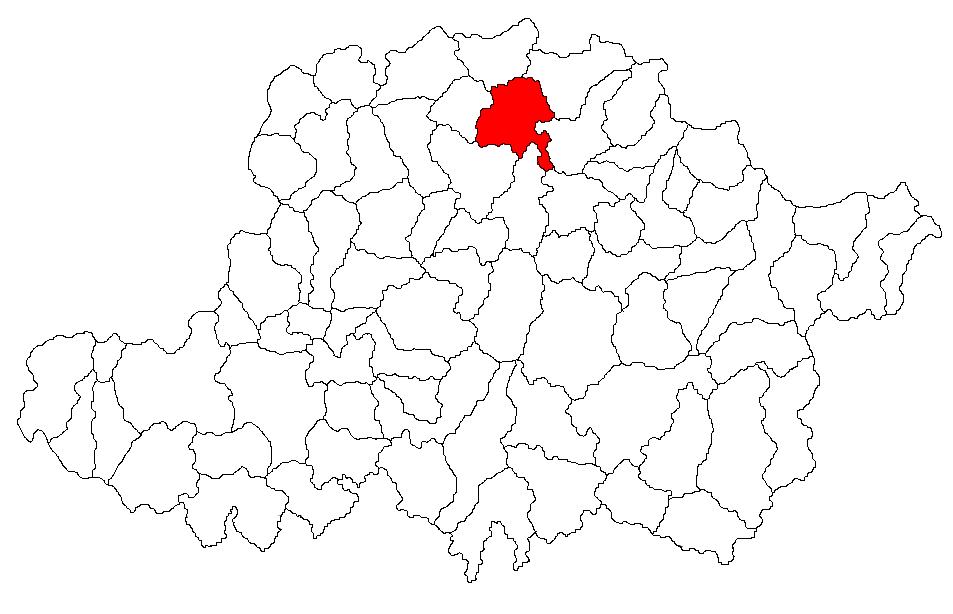
- Location in Arad County

- Location in Romania
- Coordinates: 46°33′N 21°51′E
- Country: Romania
- County: Arad
- Population (2021-12-01): 2,537
- Time zone: EET/EEST (UTC+2/+3)
- Vehicle reg.: AR

Cermei (Hungarian: Csermő, German: Tschermei) is a commune in Arad County, Romania, situated in the Teuz Plateau, in the basin of the river Sartiș. It is composed of three villages: Avram Iancu (Püspökpuszta), Cermei (situated at 67 km from Arad) and Șomoșcheș (Somoskeszi).

== Population ==
According to the 2021 Romanian census, the population of the commune counts 2,856 inhabitants, out of which 87.5% are Romanians, 6.9% Hungarians, 4.6% Roms, 0.5% Germans and 0.5% are of other or undeclared nationalities.

== History ==
The first documentary record of the locality Cermei dates back to 1429. Avram Iancu was mentioned in documents in 1828, while Șomoșcheș in 1332.

== Economy ==
The economy of the commune is mainly agricultural, both component sectors are well-developed.
