= Codru-Moma Mountains =

Mountains in Romania

Coordinates: 46.5364°N 22.1758°E

The Codru-Moma Mountains (Munții Codru-Moma) are a part of the Apuseni Mountains. They are specifically located in the Arad and Bihor counties, within the Western Romanian Carpathians of Crișana, Romania.

The Apuseni Mountains, the bastion with which the arc of the Romanian Carpathians closes, send three peninsular extensions to the west that penetrate the Crisul Plain. The central extension is formed by the Codru-Moma Mountains, framed by the Padurea Craiului to the north and the Zarand Mountains to the south.

Unlike the Padurea Craiului and Zarand Mountains, which are connected by strong insertions to the large mass of the Apuseni, respectively by the Vladeasa and Metaliferi Mountains, the Codru-Moma Mountains have a weaker connection, a kind of narrow bridge that connects them to the Bihor Mountains.

This fact makes them well-defined, with pronounced boundaries and almost detached from the central part of the Apuseni, appearing as an island mountain mass surrounded by depressions.

To the north, the boundary is formed by the Crisul Negru with a segment of its middle course. To the east, the mountains' boundary is determined by the wide Beius depression, a gulf that lies between them and the Bihor Mountains. To the south, the boundary is formed by the Crisul Alb valley, which separates them from the Zarand Mountains. To the west, the edge of the mountains is not accentuated, as they descend slowly, through gentle peaks, towards the Crisului Plain.

Within the described limits, Codru-Moma occupies an area of about 1200 km2, reaching its maximum height at the Plesu peak, of 1112m.

As the name suggests, the Codru-Moma Mountains are formed by two distinct mountain groups: the Codru Mountains and the Moma Mountains, separated quite clearly by two divergent valleys, the Briheni Valley (in the east) and the Moneasa Valley (in the west). The Codru Mountains occupy the northern and southwestern part of the massif, the Moma Mountains the southwestern part.
