= Culișer Canal =

Canal in Romania and Hungary

Culișer Canal (Kölesér)

Geography
- Start point: Crișul Negru at Tăut, Bihor County, Romania
- End point: Körös near Békés, Békés County, Hungary
- Beginning coordinates: 46.7427°N 21.8552°E
- Ending coordinates: 46.8438°N 21.1055°E
- Towns: Salonta

The Culișer Canal (Romanian: Canalul Culișer, Hungarian: Kölesér) is an artificial canal, starting from the river Crișul Negru upstream of the village of Tăut in Romania. Used mainly for irrigation and drainage, it crosses the city of Salonta and then flows into Hungary. Near Sarkadkeresztúr it joins the Hosszúfok-Határér-Kölesér canal, which discharges into the Körös north of Békés. The canal intercepts several tributaries of the right bank of the Crișul Negru, and crosses the Criș Collector Canal near Tulca.
