= Beiușele =

River in Romania

- Location within Romania

Location
- Country: Romania
- Counties: Bihor
- Villages: Cresuia, Beiușele

Physical characteristics
- Source: Vlădeasa Mountains, Mount Mermez
  - coordinates: 46°42′55″N 22°33′17″E
  - elevation: 852 m (2,795 ft)
- Mouth: Nimăiești
  - location: Nimăiești
  - coordinates: 46°41′01″N 22°23′27″E
  - elevation: 211 m (692 ft)
- Length: 18.1 km (11.2 mi)
- Basin size: 38 km^{2} (15 sq mi)

Basin features
- Progression: Nimăiești→ Crișul Negru→ Körös→ Tisza→ Danube→ Black Sea
- Tributaries
  - right: Valea Luncii, Valea Drăgoeștilor

The Beiușele is a right tributary of the river Nimăiești in Romania. It has a length of 18.1 km (11.2 mi) and its basin size is 38 km^{2} (15 sq mi). It flows into the Nimăiești river in the village of Nimăiești.
