= Nimăiești =

- Location within Romania

Location
- Country: Romania
- Counties: Bihor
- Villages: Budureasa, Burda, Pocioveliște, Curățele, Nimăiești, Beiuș

Physical characteristics
- Source: Vlădeasa Mountains
- Mouth: Crișul Negru
  - location: Beiuș
  - coordinates: 46°39′48″N 22°20′28″E
- Length: 26 km (16 mi)
- Basin size: 109 km^{2} (42 sq mi)

Basin features
- Progression: Crișul Negru→ Körös→ Tisza→ Danube→ Black Sea
- Tributaries
  - left: Cohu
  - right: Valea Plaiului, Burda, Beiușele

The Nimăiești is a right tributary of the river Crișul Negru in Romania. Its length is 26 km (16 mi) and its basin size is 109 km^{2} (42 sq mi). The 26 km long river discharges into the Crișul Negru in Beiuș.
