= Mizieș =

River in Romania

- Location within Romania

Location
- Country: Romania
- Counties: Bihor County
- Villages: Teleac, Mizieș

Physical characteristics
- Source: Vlădeasa Mountains
  - coordinates: 46°40′21″N 22°26′22″E
  - elevation: 293 m (961 ft)
- Mouth: Crișul Negru
  - location: Beiuș
  - coordinates: 46°39′19″N 22°21′01″E
  - elevation: 180 m (590 ft)
- Length: 13 km (8.1 mi)
- Basin size: 22 km^{2} (8.5 sq mi)

Basin features
- Progression: Crișul Negru→ Körös→ Tisza→ Danube→ Black Sea

The Mizieș is a right tributary of the river Crișul Negru in Romania. It discharges into the Crișul Negru near Beiuș. Its length is 13 km (8.1 mi) and its basin size is 22 km^{2} (8.5 sq mi).
