= Talpe =

- Location within Romania

Location
- Country: Romania
- Counties: Bihor County
- Villages: Saca, Săliște de Beiuș, Talpe, Livada Beiușului, Grădinari

Physical characteristics
- Source: Vlădeasa Mountains
- Mouth: Crișul Negru
  - location: Grădinari
  - coordinates: 46°38′47″N 22°21′41″E
  - elevation: 186 m (610 ft)
- Length: 12 km (7.5 mi)
- Basin size: 16 km^{2} (6.2 sq mi)

Basin features
- Progression: Crișul Negru→ Körös→ Tisza→ Danube→ Black Sea

The Talpe is a right tributary of the river Crișul Negru in Romania. It discharges into the Crișul Negru in Grădinari. Its length is 12 km (7.5 mi) and its basin size is 16 km^{2} (6.2 sq mi).
