= Crișul Nou =

- Location within Romania

Location
- Country: Romania
- Counties: Bihor County
- Villages: Vărzarii de Sus, Vărzarii de Jos, Sârbești

Physical characteristics
- Mouth: Crișul Negru
  - location: Lunca
  - coordinates: 46.5237°N 22.4575°E
- Length: 12.5 km (7.8 mi)
- Basin size: 30 km^{2} (12 sq mi)

Basin features
- Progression: Crișul Negru→ Körös→ Tisza→ Danube→ Black Sea

The Crișul Nou is a right tributary of the river Crișul Negru in Romania. It flows into the Crișul Negru in Lunca. Its length is 12.5 km (7.8 mi) and its basin size is 30 km^{2} (12 sq mi).
