= Pârâul Țarinii =

- Location within Romania

Location
- Country: Romania
- Counties: Bihor County
- Villages: Călugări, Izbuc

Physical characteristics
- Source: Bihor Mountains
- Mouth: Crișul Negru
  - location: Vașcău
  - coordinates: 46.4764°N 22.4737°E
- Length: 12 km (7.5 mi)
- Basin size: 38 km^{2} (15 sq mi)

Basin features
- Progression: Crișul Negru→ Körös→ Tisza→ Danube→ Black Sea
- Tributaries
  - left: Ponor

The Pârâul Țarinii is a left tributary of the river Crișul Negru in Romania. It flows into the Crișul Negru in Vașcău. Its length is 12 km (7.5 mi) and its basin size is 38 km^{2} (15 sq mi).
