= Finis =

Finis may refer to:

- Finiș, a commune in Bihor County, Romania
- Finiș (river), a river in Bihor County, Romania
- "Finis" (short story), the 1906 science fiction / horror story by Frank L. Pollack
- Finis (album), a 1983 album by Finis Henderson III
- Finis J. Garrett (1875–1956), U.S. Representative and federal judge
- Jefferson Finis Davis (1808–1889), President of the Confederate States of America
- Chancellor Finis Valorum, a fictional character from the Star Wars franchise
