= Valea Mare (Crișul Negru) =

- Location within Romania

Location
- Country: Romania
- Counties: Bihor County
- Villages: Cusuiuș

Physical characteristics
- Source: Codru-Moma Mountains
- Mouth: Crișul Negru
  - location: Sudrigiu
  - coordinates: 46.5852°N 22.4282°E
- Length: 8.9 km (5.5 mi)
- Basin size: 21.7 km^{2} (8.4 sq mi)

Basin features
- Progression: Crișul Negru→ Körös→ Tisza→ Danube→ Black Sea
- Tributaries
  - left: Valea Mateieș

The Valea Mare is a left tributary of the river Crișul Negru in Romania. It flows into the Crișul Negru near Cusuiuș. Its length is 8.9 km (5.5 mi) and its basin size is 21.7 km^{2} (8.4 sq mi).
