= Rătășel =

- Location within Romania

Location
- Country: Romania
- Counties: Bihor County
- Villages: Cociuba Mare

Physical characteristics
- Mouth: Crișul Negru
  - location: Tăut
  - coordinates: 46.7263°N 21.8469°E
- Length: 33 km (21 mi)
- Basin size: 106 km^{2} (41 sq mi)

Basin features
- Progression: Crișul Negru→ Körös→ Tisza→ Danube→ Black Sea

The Rătășel is a left tributary of the Crișul Negru in Romania. It flows into the Crișul Negru near Tăut. Its length is 33 km (21 mi) and its basin size is 106 km^{2} (41 sq mi).
