= Valea Mare (Șuncuiș) =

- Location within Romania

Location
- Country: Romania
- Counties: Bihor County

Physical characteristics
- Mouth: Crișul Negru
  - location: Șuncuiș
  - coordinates: 46.6819°N 22.2597°E
- Length: 10 km (6.2 mi)
- Basin size: 15 km^{2} (5.8 sq mi)

Basin features
- Progression: Crișul Negru→ Körös→ Tisza→ Danube→ Black Sea

The Valea Mare is a river in Romania, left tributary of the Crișul Negru. It flows into the Crișul Negru in Șuncuiș. Its length is 10 km (6.2 mi) and its basin size is 15 km^{2} (5.8 sq mi).
