= Criștior =

- Location within Romania

Location
- Country: Romania
- Counties: Bihor County
- Villages: Criștioru de Sus, Criștioru de Jos

Physical characteristics
- Source: Bihor Mountains
- Mouth: Crișul Negru
  - location: Cărpinet
  - coordinates: 46.4538°N 22.4936°E
- Length: 15 km (9.3 mi)
- Basin size: 30 km^{2} (12 sq mi)

Basin features
- Progression: Crișul Negru→ Körös→ Tisza→ Danube→ Black Sea

The Criștior is a left tributary of the river Crișul Negru in Romania. Its length is 15 km (9.3 mi) and its basin size is 30 km^{2} (12 sq mi). It flows into the Crișul Negru in Cărpinet.
