= Tărcăița =

- Location within Romania

Location
- Country: Romania
- Counties: Bihor County
- Villages: Tărcăița, Tărcaia

Physical characteristics
- Source: Codru-Moma Mountains
- Mouth: Crișul Negru
  - coordinates: 46.6329°N 22.3682°E
- Length: 18 km (11 mi)
- Basin size: 54 km^{2} (21 sq mi)

Basin features
- Progression: Crișul Negru→ Körös→ Tisza→ Danube→ Black Sea
- Tributaries
  - left: Valea cea Mică

The Tărcăița is a left tributary of the river Crișul Negru in Romania. Its length is 18 km (11 mi) and its basin size is 54 km^{2} (21 sq mi). It discharges into the Crișul Negru in Tărcaia.
