= Briheni =

- Location within Romania

Location
- Country: Romania
- Counties: Bihor County
- Villages: Briheni

Physical characteristics
- Source: Bihor Mountains
- Mouth: Crișul Negru
  - coordinates: 46.5043°N 22.4597°E
- Length: 11.4 km (7.1 mi)
- Basin size: 122.5 km^{2} (47.3 sq mi)

Basin features
- Progression: Crișul Negru→ Körös→ Tisza→ Danube→ Black Sea
- Tributaries
  - left: Crișul Văratecului
  - right: Pârâul Boului

The Briheni is a left tributary of the river Crișul Negru in Romania. Its length is 11.4 km (7.1 mi) and its basin size is 122.5 km^{2} (47.3 sq mi). It flows into the Crișul Negru in Șuștiu.
