= Valea Neagră (Crișul Negru) =

- Location within Romania

Location
- Country: Romania
- Counties: Bihor County
- Villages: Valea de Sus, Moţeşti, Valea de Jos, Rieni

Physical characteristics
- Source: Bihor Mountains, Dealul Brusturi
  - coordinates: 46°32′44″N 22°33′12″E
  - elevation: 419 m (1,375 ft)
- Mouth: Crișul Negru
  - location: Rieni
  - coordinates: 46°34′24″N 22°26′12″E
  - elevation: 220 m (720 ft)
- Length: 12 km (7.5 mi)
- Basin size: 25 km^{2} (9.7 sq mi)

Basin features
- Progression: Crișul Negru→ Körös→ Tisza→ Danube→ Black Sea

The Valea Neagră is a right tributary of the river Crișul Negru in Romania. It discharges into the Crișul Negru in Rieni. Its length is 12 km (7.5 mi) and its basin size is 25 km^{2} (9.7 sq mi).
