= Crăiasa =

- Location within Romania

Location
- Country: Romania
- Counties: Bihor County
- Villages: Giulești, Chișcău, Brădet, Stâncești, Dumbrăvani, Sudrigiu

Physical characteristics
- Source: Bihor Mountains
  - coordinates: 46°31′57″N 22°37′22″E
  - elevation: 1,135 m (3,724 ft)
- Mouth: Crișul Negru
  - location: Sudrigiu
  - coordinates: 46.5922°N 22.4263°E
  - elevation: 210 m (690 ft)
- Length: 17.4 km (10.8 mi)
- Basin size: 26.8 km^{2} (10.3 sq mi)

Basin features
- Progression: Crișul Negru→ Körös→ Tisza→ Danube→ Black Sea
- Tributaries
  - right: Valea Fagului

The Crăiasa is a right tributary of the river Crișul Negru in Romania. Its length is 17.4 kilometres (10.8 mi) and its basin size is 26.8 square kilometres (10.3 sq mi). It discharges into the Crișul Negru in Sudrigiu.
