= Pusta (Crișul Negru) =

River in Romania

- Location within Romania

Location
- Country: Romania
- Counties: Bihor County
- Villages: Cărăndeni, Miheleu, Râpa

Physical characteristics
- Source: Cărăndeni
  - coordinates: 46°51′46″N 22°04′50″E
  - elevation: 277 m (909 ft)
- Mouth: Crișul Negru
  - location: Râpa
  - coordinates: 46°46′15″N 22°00′39″E
  - elevation: 120 m (390 ft)
- Length: 12 km (7.5 mi)
- Basin size: 25 km^{2} (9.7 sq mi)

Basin features
- Progression: Crișul Negru→ Körös→ Tisza→ Danube→ Black Sea
- Tributaries
  - left: Pârâul Dumbrăvilor

The Pusta is a right tributary of the river Crișul Negru in Romania. It discharges into the Crișul Negru in Râpa. Its length is 12 km (7.5 mi) and its basin size is 25 km^{2} (9.7 sq mi).
