= Pusta =

Pusta may refer to:

- Pusta (landscape), a Hungarian traditional landscape best known as Puszta
- Pusta, a village in Şincai Commune, Mureș County, Romania
- Pusta, a village in Șimleu Silvaniei, Sălaj County, Romania
- Pusta River (South Morava), a river in Serbia, tributary of the South Morava
- Pusta River (Vlasina), a river in Serbia, tributary of the Vlasina
- Pusta (Crișul Negru), a river in Romania, tributary of the Crișul Negru
- Kaarel Robert Pusta (1883–1964), Estonian politician
