= Crișul Mic (Crișul Negru) =

- Location within Romania

Location
- Country: Romania
- Counties: Bihor County

Physical characteristics
- Mouth: Crișul Negru
  - coordinates: 46.7616°N 22.0496°E
- Length: 17 km (11 mi)
- Basin size: 41 km^{2} (16 sq mi)

Basin features
- Progression: Crișul Negru→ Körös→ Tisza→ Danube→ Black Sea

The Crișul Mic is a left tributary of the Crișul Negru in Bihor County, western Romania. It joins the Crișul Negru downstream of Ginta. Its length is 17 km (11 mi) and its basin size is 41 km^{2} (16 sq mi).
