= Saraz =

Saraz may refer to:

== Places ==
- Saraz, Doubs, a commune in France
- Săraz, a river in Timiș County, Romania
- Saraz (river), a river in Bihor County, Romania
- Saraz region, in Jammu and Kashmir, India

== People ==
- Jenő Ábrahám, nicknamed Saraz, Hungarian–Yugoslav footballer
- Rodrigo Saraz, Colombian footballer

== See also ==
- Sarazi, a language of the Saraz region of India
