= Saraz (river) =

- Location within Romania

Location
- Country: Romania
- Counties: Bihor County

Physical characteristics
- Source
  - coordinates: 46°48′01″N 21°59′43″E
  - elevation: 200 m (660 ft)
- Mouth: Crișul Negru
  - location: Downstream of Tinca
  - coordinates: 46°45′15″N 21°53′24″E
  - elevation: 108 m (354 ft)
- Length: 14 km (8.7 mi)
- Basin size: 19 km^{2} (7.3 sq mi)

Basin features
- Progression: Crișul Negru→ Körös→ Tisza→ Danube→ Black Sea

The Saraz is a right tributary of the river Crișul Negru in Romania. It discharges into the Crișul Negru near Tinca. Its length is 14 km (8.7 mi) and its basin size is 19 km^{2} (7.3 sq mi).
