= Beiuș (disambiguation) =

Beiuș may refer to several places in Bihor County, Romania:

- Beiuș, a city
- Lazuri de Beiuș, a commune
- Uileacu de Beiuș, a commune, and its village of Vălanii de Beiuș
- Poclușa de Beiuș, Sânnicolau de Beiuș and Urviș de Beiuș, villages in Șoimi Commune
