= Finiș (river) =

- Location within Romania

Location
- Country: Romania
- Counties: Bihor County

Physical characteristics
- Mouth: Crișul Negru
  - coordinates: 46.6618°N 22.3198°E
- Length: 23 km (14 mi)
- Basin size: 87 km^{2} (34 sq mi)

Basin features
- Progression: Crișul Negru→ Körös→ Tisza→ Danube→ Black Sea
- Tributaries
  - left: Bălăteasa
  - right: Izbucul

The Finiș is a left tributary of the river Crișul Negru in Romania. It starts at the confluence of headwaters Bălăteasa and Izbucul. Its length is 23 km (14 mi) and its basin size is 87 km^{2} (34 sq mi). It discharges into the Crișul Negru in the village Finiș.
