= Băleni =

Băleni may refer to several places in Romania:

- Băleni, a commune in Dâmboviţa County
- Băleni, a commune in Galați County
- Băleni, a village in Lazuri de Beiuș Commune, Bihor County
