= Budureasa mine =

Mine in Romania

- Location within Romania
- Location: Budureasa, Bihor County, Romania; 46°40′0.01″N 22°30′0″E
- Products: Magnesium
- Opened: 2009
- Company: PSV Company

The Budureasa mine is a large mine in the northwest of Romania in Bihor County, 100 km (62 mi) southeast of Oradea and 478 km (297 mi) north of the capital, Bucharest. Budureasa represents the largest magnesium reserve in Romania and the largest in Europe having estimated reserves of 40 million tonnes of ore grading 30% magnesium.
