= Zerind =

Zerind Nagyzerénd
- Commune
- Location within the county

- Location in Romania
- Coordinates: 46°37′N 21°31′E
- Country: Romania
- County: Arad
- Area: 61.39 km^{2} (23.70 sq mi)
- Elevation: 89 m (292 ft)
- Population (2021-12-01): 1,299
  - Density: 21.16/km^{2} (54.80/sq mi)
- Time zone: UTC+02:00 (EET)
  - Summer (DST): UTC+03:00 (EEST)
- Vehicle reg.: AR

Zerind (Hungarian: Nagyzerénd) is a commune in Arad County, Romania. Its administrative territory stretches over 5100 hectares and it is situated in the lower part of the Crișurilor Plateau, at Romania's western border, on the Crișul Negru's valley. It is composed of two villages: Iermata Neagră (Feketegyarmat) and Zerind (situated at 56 km from Arad).

== Population ==
According to the last census, the population of the commune counts 1303 inhabitants, out of which 7.98% are Romanians, 89.87% Hungarians, 1,84% Roms and 0,2% are of other or undeclared nationalities.

== History ==
The first documentary record of Zerind dates back to 1169, while Iermata Neagră was first mentioned in 1241.

== Economy ==
The commune's economy is prevalently agrarian. Vegetable-growing and livestock-breeding are the most developed economic sectors. In the last few years a significant evolution can be observed in the tertiary economic sector.

== Tourism ==
There is a Reformed church in Iermata Neagră dating from 1799. The zone of the river Crișul Negru is abounding in game and fish.
