= Tulca =

- Commune
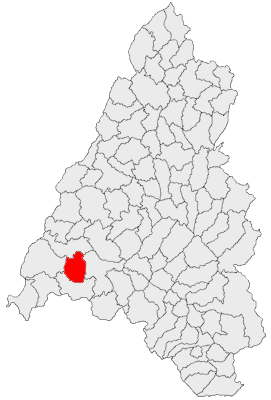
- Location in Bihor County

- Location in Romania
- Coordinates: 46°47′N 21°47′E
- Country: Romania
- County: Bihor
- Population (2021-12-01): 2,504
- Time zone: UTC+02:00 (EET)
  - Summer (DST): UTC+03:00 (EEST)
- Vehicle reg.: BH

Tulca (Hungarian: Tulka) is a commune in Bihor County, Crișana, Romania. It is located 12 kilometers from the city of Salonta and is composed of two villages, Căuașd (Kávásd) and Tulca. Most of the population is Romanian, but there are small minorities of Hungarians and Romani.
