= Tărcaia =

Tărcaia Köröstárkány
- Commune
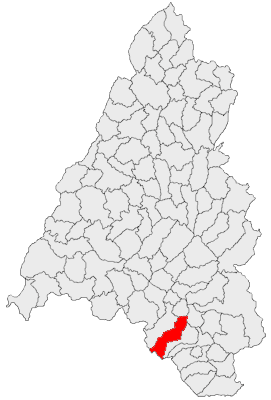
- Location in Bihor County

- Location in Romania
- Coordinates: 46°38′N 22°22′E
- Country: Romania
- County: Bihor
- Population (2021-12-01): 1,799
- Time zone: EET/EEST (UTC+2/+3)
- Vehicle reg.: BH

Tărcaia (Hungarian: Köröstárkány) is a commune in Bihor County, Crișana, Romania with a population of 1,969 people. It is composed of four villages: Mierag (Mérág), Tărcaia, Tărcăița (Tárkányka) and Totoreni (Tatárfalva).

== Geography ==
Tărcaia lies along the river bank of the Crișul Negru in the southeastern part of Bihor County, around 65 km south-east of Oradea and 4 km south of Beiuș.

== Ethnic groups ==
According to the 2002 census, the ethnic structure is 53.89% Hungarians with a population of 1161, 45.91% Romanians with a population of 989. There is also a small community of Ukrainians and Germans, respectively 0.13% and 0.04%.
