= Cărpinet =

- Commune
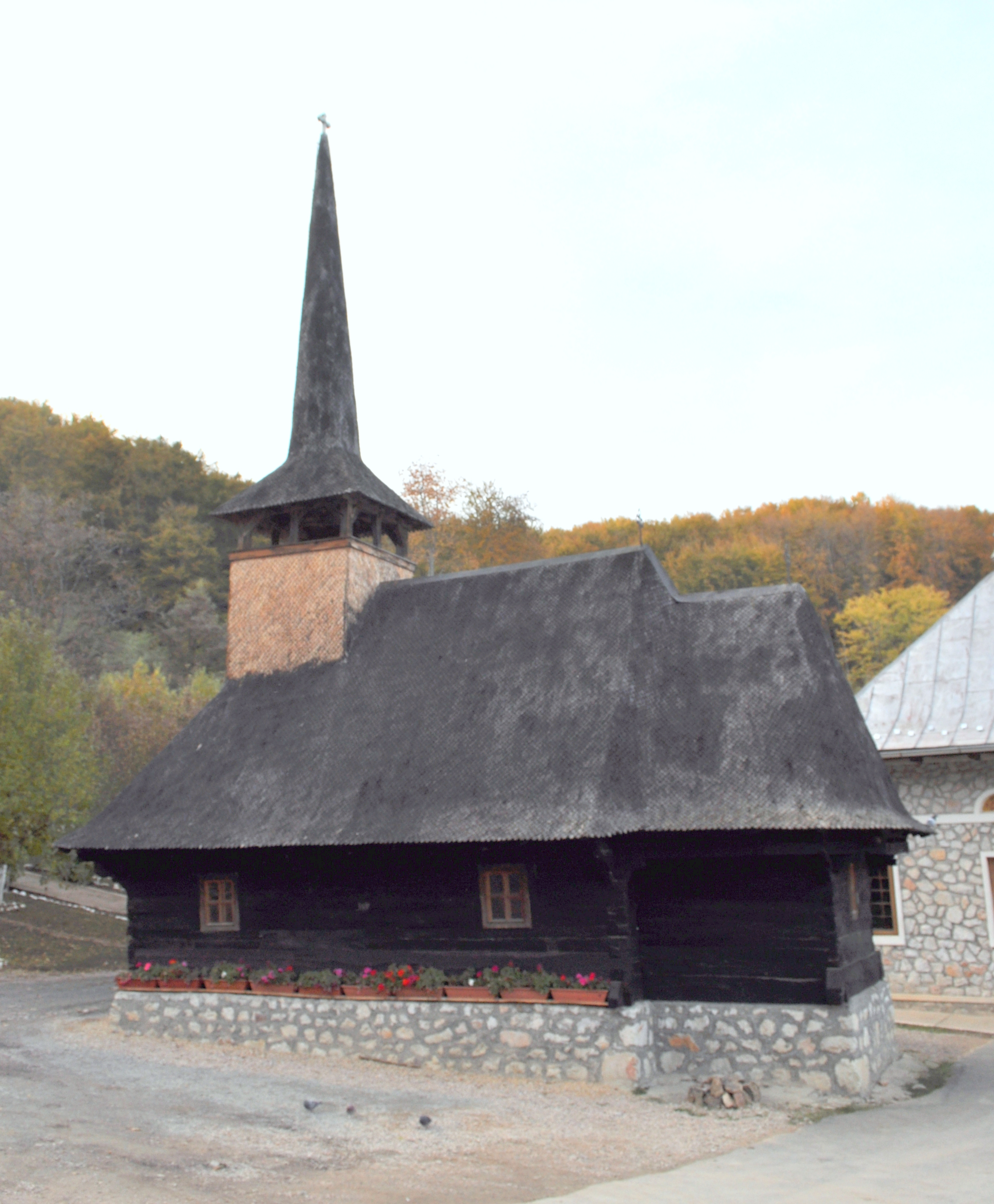
- Wooden church of Izbuc Monastery

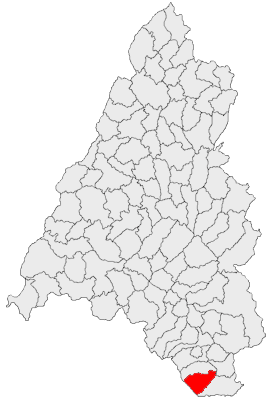
- Location in Bihor County

- Location in Romania
- Coordinates: 46°27′N 22°29′E
- Country: Romania
- County: Bihor

Government
  - Mayor (2020–2024): Petru-Daniel Curta (PSD)
- Area: 69.19 km^{2} (26.71 sq mi)
- Elevation: 316 m (1,037 ft)
- Population (2021-12-01): 1,607
  - Density: 23.23/km^{2} (60.15/sq mi)
- Time zone: UTC+02:00 (EET)
  - Summer (DST): UTC+03:00 (EEST)
- Postal code: 417135
- Area code: +(40) 259
- Vehicle reg.: BH
- Website: www.primaria-carpinet.ro

Cărpinet (Hungarian: Kerpenyéd) is a commune in Bihor County, Crișana, Romania with a population of 1,607 people as of 2021. It is composed of four villages: Călugări (Kalugyer), Cărpinet, Izbuc (Vaskohszohodol), and Leheceni (Lehecsény).

The commune is situated at an altitude of 316 m (1,037 ft), in the western foothills of the Bihor Mountains. It lies on the banks of the river Untu, a tributary of Crișul Negru. It is located at the southern extremity of Bihor County, 9.6 km (6 mi) south of the town of Ștei, on the border with Arad County.

Cărpinet is crossed by national road DN76 (part of European route E79), which runs from the county seat, Oradea, 89 km (55 mi) to the northwest, to Deva, 96 km (60 mi) to the southeast.

Historical population
Year	Pop.	±%
1880	2,433	—
1890	2,845	+16.9%
1900	3,022	+6.2%
1910	3,441	+13.9%
1920	3,494	+1.5%
1930	3,785	+8.3%
1941	3,730	−1.5%
1956	3,531	−5.3%
1966	3,268	−7.4%
1977	3,157	−3.4%
1992	2,713	−14.1%
2002	2,264	−16.5%
2011	1,932	−14.7%
2021	1,607	−16.8%
Source: Census data
