= Lunca, Bihor =

Lunca
- Commune
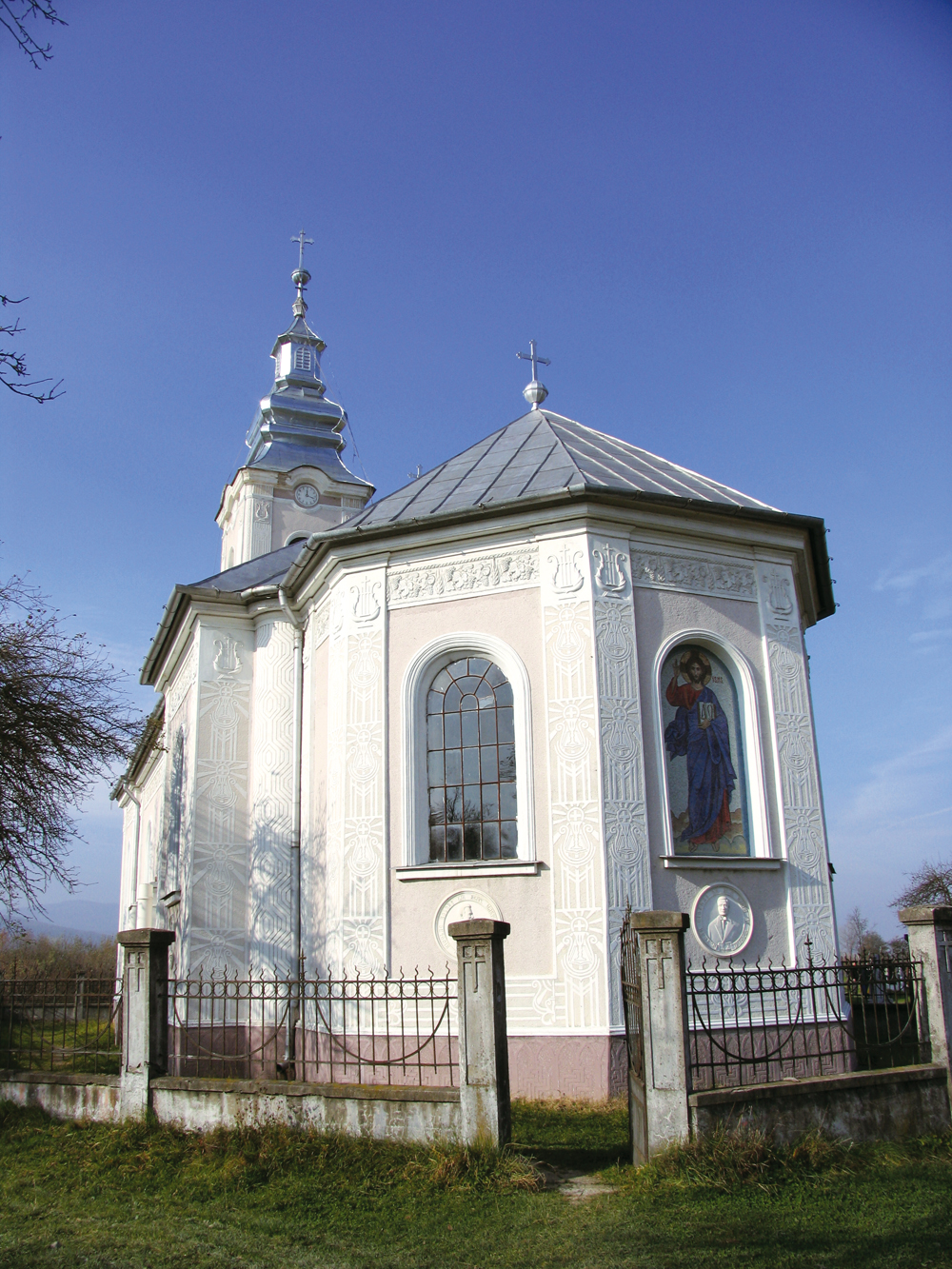
- Church in Lunca

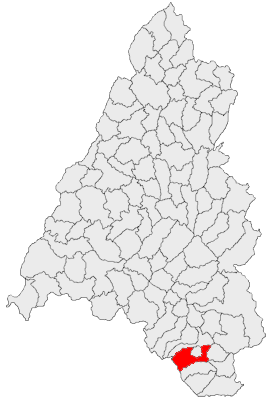
- Location in Bihor County

- Location in Romania
- Coordinates: 46°31′N 22°28′E
- Country: Romania
- County: Bihor

Government
  - Mayor (2020–2024): Ioan Popa (PNL)
- Area: 14.57 km^{2} (5.63 sq mi)
- Elevation: 248 m (814 ft)
- Population (2021-12-01): 2,429
  - Density: 166.7/km^{2} (431.8/sq mi)
- Time zone: UTC+02:00 (EET)
  - Summer (DST): UTC+03:00 (EEST)
- Postal code: 417320
- Area code: +(40) x59
- Vehicle reg.: BH

Lunca (Hungarian: Biharlonka) is a commune in Bihor County, Crișana, Romania. It is composed of six villages: Briheni (Berhény), Hotărel (Határ), Lunca, Sârbești (Szerbesd), Seghiște (Szegyesd), and Șuștiu (Susd).

== Demographics ==
At the 2011 census, Lunca had 2,887 inhabitants, down from 3,124 inhabitants in the 2002 census. Almost all of the inhabitants were ethnic Romanians (96.95%); for 1.73% of the population, ethnicity was unknown. 94.87% of inhabitants are Orthodox, 2.63% are Pentecostal, and 1.73% are unknown. At the 2021 census, the commune had a population of 2,429; of those, 94.15% were Romanians.
