= Curățele =

- Commune
- Location in Bihor County

- Location in Romania
- Coordinates: 46°42′N 22°25′E
- Country: Romania
- County: Bihor
- Population (2021-12-01): 2,319
- Time zone: EET/EEST (UTC+2/+3)
- Vehicle reg.: BH

Curățele (Hungarian: Tisztásfalva) is a commune in Bihor County, Crișana, Romania with a population of 2,509 people. It is composed of five villages: Beiușele (Kisbelényes), Cresuia (Kereszély), Curățele, Nimăiești (Nyimesd) and Pocioveliște (Pócsafalva).
