= Lazuri de Beiuș =

- Commune
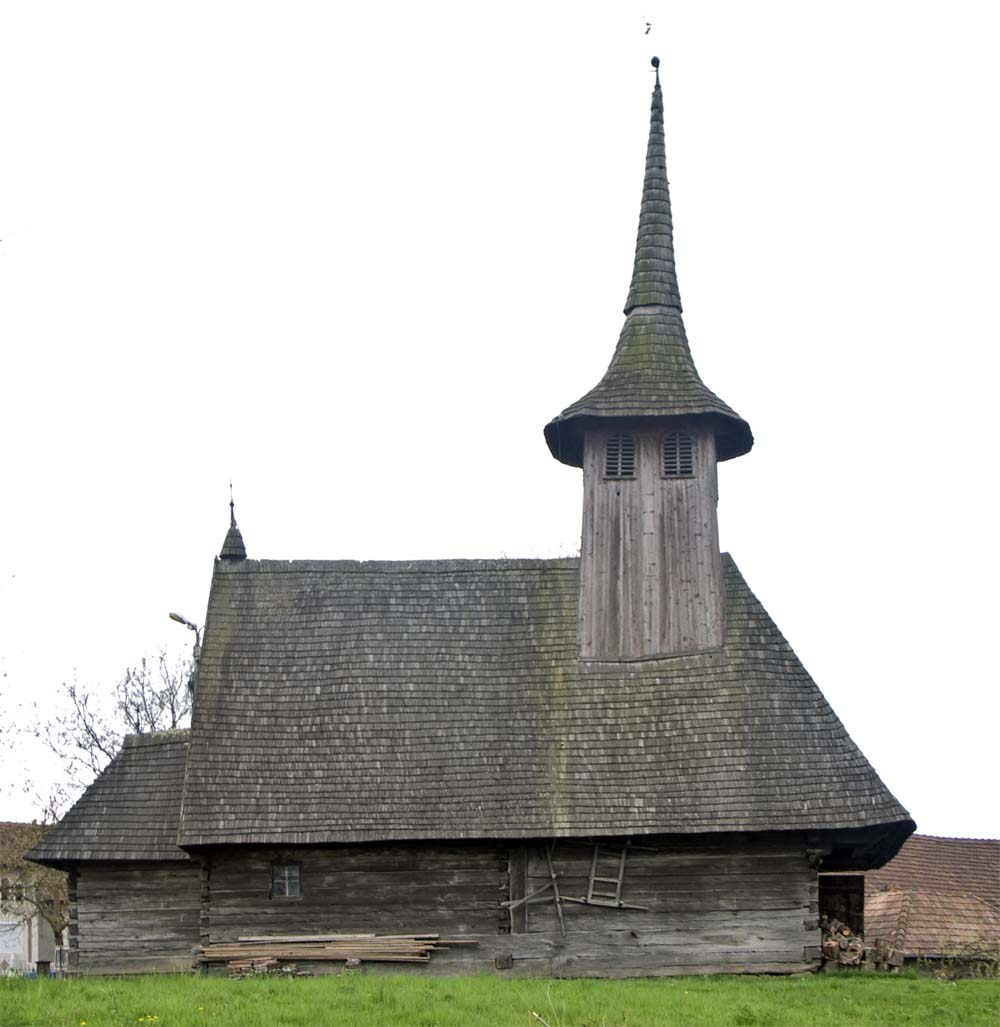
- Wooden church in Lazuri de Beiuș

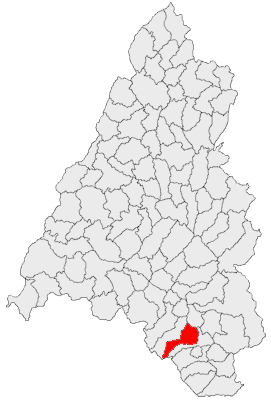
- Location in Bihor County

- Location in Romania
- Coordinates: 46°35′N 22°24′E
- Country: Romania
- County: Bihor

Government
  - Mayor (2020–2024): Adrian Bogoșel (PNL)
- Area: 58.92 km^{2} (22.75 sq mi)
- Elevation: 216 m (709 ft)
- Population (2021-12-01): 1,487
  - Density: 25.24/km^{2} (65.37/sq mi)
- Time zone: UTC+02:00 (EET)
  - Summer (DST): UTC+03:00 (EEST)
- Postal code: 417300
- Area code: +40 x59
- Vehicle reg.: BH
- Website: lazuridebeius.ro

Lazuri de Beiuș (Hungarian: Belényesirtás) is a commune in Bihor County, Crișana, Romania with a population of 1,487 people as of 2021. It is composed of four villages: Băleni (Balalény), Cusuiuș (Köszvényes), Hinchiriș (Henkeres), and Lazuri de Beiuș.

The commune is located in the southeastern part of the county, on the border with Arad County. It lies on the banks of the river Valea Mare.
