= Crișul Negru =

Crișul Negru Fekete-Körös
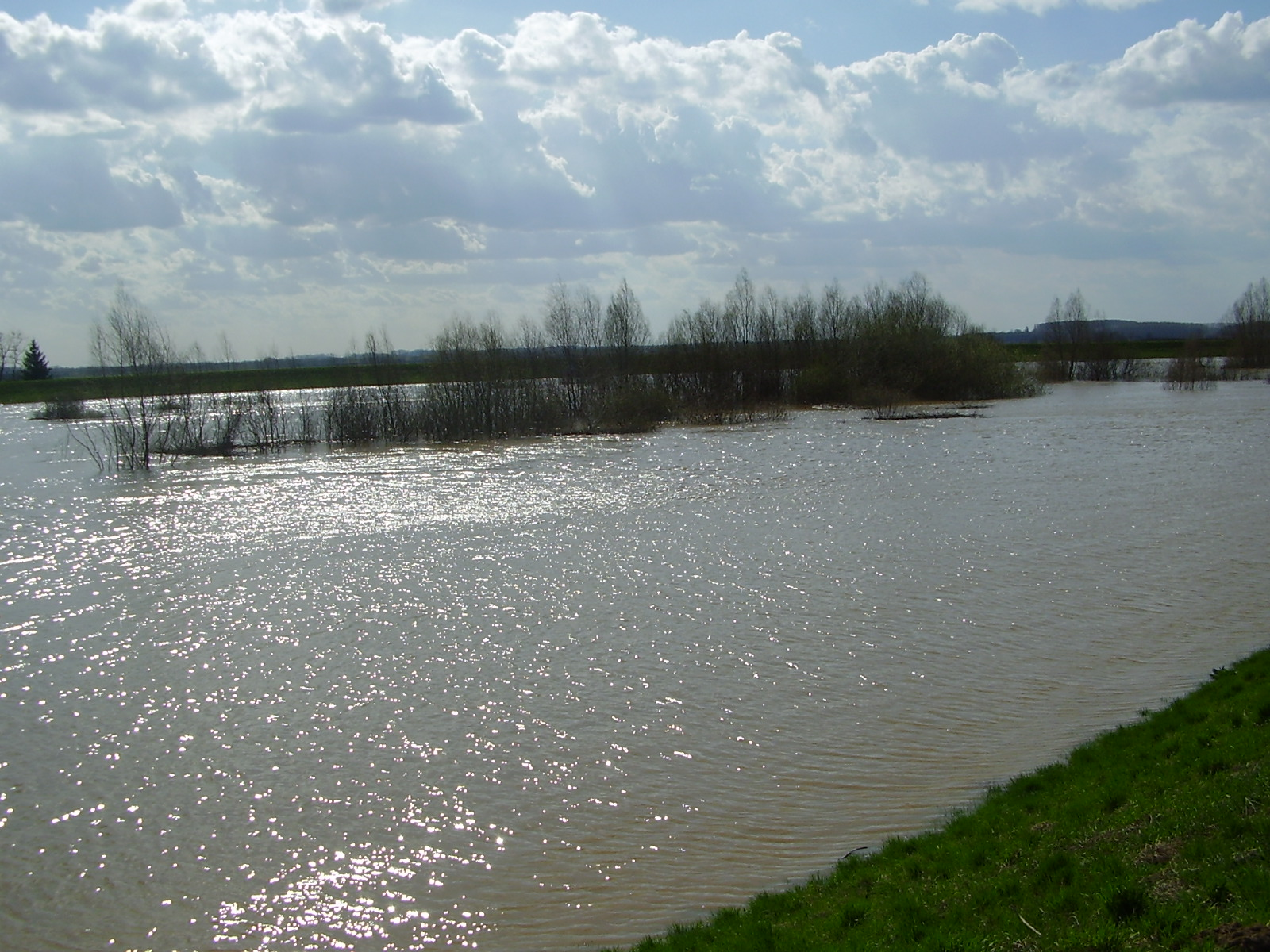

- Location within Hungary Location within Romania

Location
- Countries: Romania and Hungary
- Counties: Bihor; Arad; Békés
- Towns: Beiuș; Sarkad

Physical characteristics
- Source: Apuseni Mountains
  - elevation: 1,460 m (4,790 ft)
- Mouth: Körös (Criș)
  - location: near Gyula, Hungary
  - coordinates: 46°42′1″N 21°16′9″E
- Length: 168 km (104 mi)
- Basin size: 4,450 km^{2} (1,720 sq mi)
- Discharge
  - location: Zerind
  - average: 31.40 m^{3}/s (1,109 cu ft/s)
  - minimum: 0.47 m^{3}/s (17 cu ft/s)
  - maximum: 648 m^{3}/s (22,900 cu ft/s)

Basin features
- Progression: Körös→ Tisza→ Danube→ Black Sea
- Tributaries
  - left: Teuz
  - right: Holod

The Crișul Negru (Black Criș) (Romanian), (Hungarian: Fekete-Körös) is a river in western Romania (Transylvania) and south-eastern Hungary (Békés County). The river has its source in the western Apuseni Mountains of Romania. Flowing through the Romanian towns of Ștei and Beiuș and crossing the border of Hungary, the river, now called Fekete-Körös, joins the Fehér-Körös a few kilometres north from Gyula to form the Körös river. In Romania, its length is 164 km (102 mi) and its basin size is 3,820 km^{2} (1,470 sq mi). Part of the water from the river Crișul Repede is diverted towards the Crișul Negru by the Criș Collector Canal.

== Hydronymy ==
The name of this river comes from earlier Dacian Krísos, which meant "black", making this a doublet (cf. Bulg čer "black", Old Church Slavonic čǐrnǔ, Old Prussian kirsnan, Albanian sorrë "raven") with Romanian negru "black". The upper course, upstream from the confluence with the Crișul Băița, is sometimes called Crișul Poienii.

== Towns and villages ==
The following towns and villages are situated along the Crișul Negru, from source to mouth: Vașcău, Ștei, Rieni, Drăgănești, Tărcaia, Beiuș, Șuncuiuș, Uileacu de Beiuș, Șoimi, Căpâlna, Tinca, Batăr, Avram Iancu, Zerind in Romania, and Sarkad in Hungary.

== Tributaries ==
The following rivers are tributaries to the Crișul Negru (from source to mouth):

- Left: Criștior, Pârâul Țarinii, Briheni, Valea Mare (Cusuiuș), Tărcăița, Finiș, Căldărești, Șerpoasa, Valea Mare (Șuncuiș), Arman, Hălgaș, Fieghiu, Poclușa, Crișul Mic, Rătășel, Beliu, Răchest, Teuz
- Right: Crișul Nou, Crișul Băița, Valea Neagră, Crăiasa, Crișul Pietros, Talpe, Mizieș, Nimăiești, Ioaniș, Valea Roșie, Prisaca, Săliște, Holod, Pusta, Saraz, Valea Nouă
