= Batăr =

- Commune
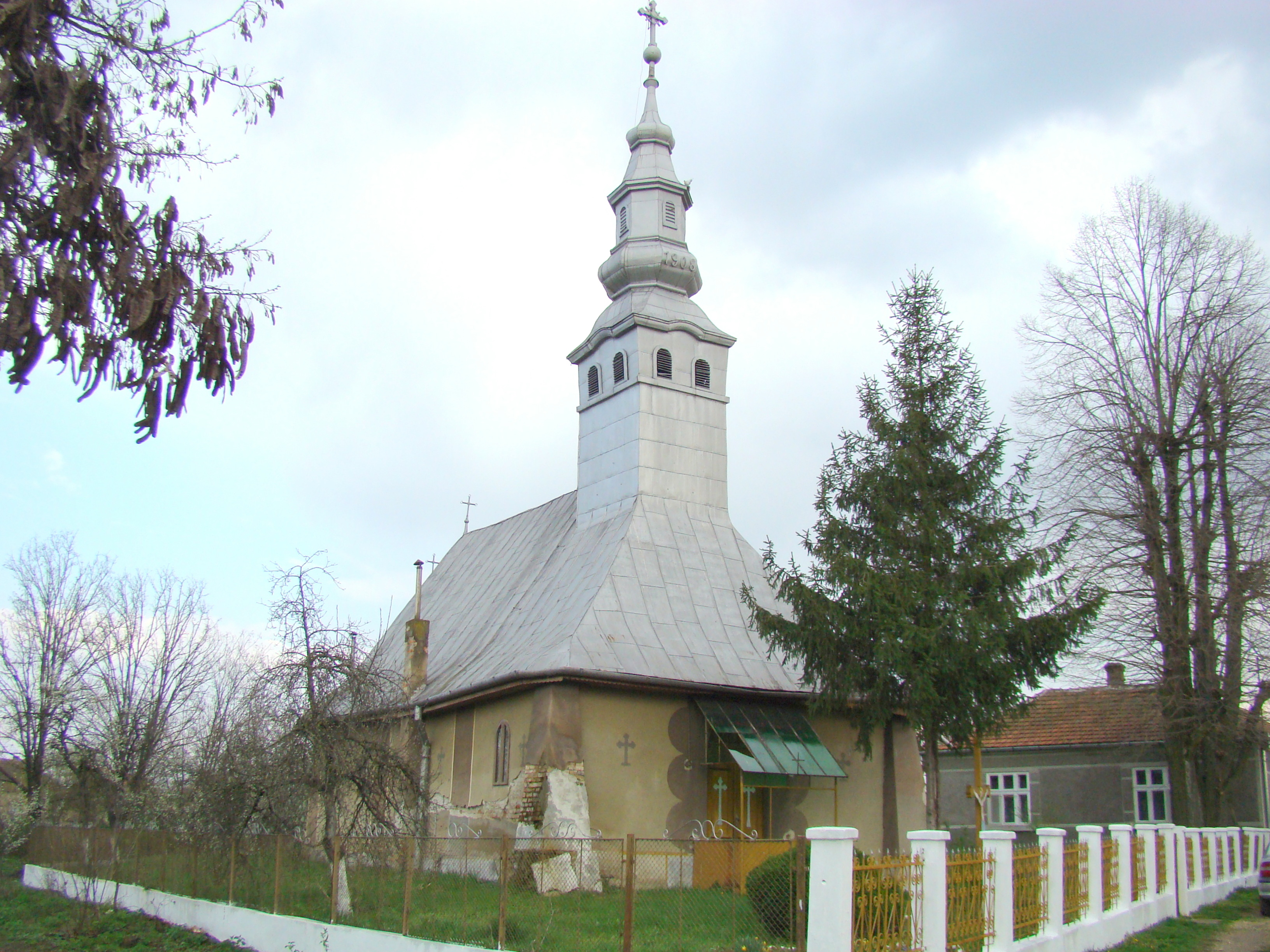
- Wooden Church in Tăut

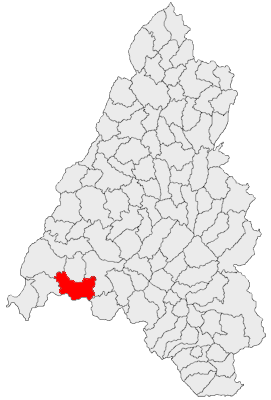
- Location in Bihor County

- Location in Romania
- Coordinates: 46°42′45″N 21°48′17″E
- Country: Romania
- County: Bihor

Government
  - Mayor (2020–2024): Ioan Mughiuruș (PSD)
- Area: 126 km^{2} (49 sq mi)
- Elevation: 100 m (330 ft)
- Population (2021-12-01): 4,922
  - Density: 39.1/km^{2} (101/sq mi)
- Time zone: UTC+02:00 (EET)
  - Summer (DST): UTC+03:00 (EEST)
- Postal code: 417045
- Area code: +(40) x59
- Vehicle reg.: BH
- Website: www.primariabatar.ro

Batăr (Hungarian: Feketebátor; Turkish: Fektebatur) is a commune located in Bihor County, Crișana, Romania. The village is situated in the south-west of the county, near the border with Hungary. The settlement lies along the river Crișul Negru and is composed of four villages: Arpășel (Árpád; Arpat), Batăr, Talpoș (Talpas), and Tăut (Feketetót).

Historical population
Year	Pop.	±%
1880	6,229	—
1890	6,947	+11.5%
1900	7,729	+11.3%
1910	7,581	−1.9%
1920	7,368	−2.8%
1930	7,495	+1.7%
1941	7,568	+1.0%
1956	7,268	−4.0%
1966	6,851	−5.7%
1977	6,112	−10.8%
1992	5,364	−12.2%
2002	5,222	−2.6%
2011	4,920	−5.8%
2021	4,922	+0.0%
Source: Census data

At the 2021 census, the commune had a population of 4,922; of those, 46.42% were Romanians, 32.02% Roma, and 12.15% Hungarians.

Notable people who lived in Batăr include composer Tiberiu Olah.

== Sights ==
- Wooden Church in Tăut, built in the 18th century, historic monument
- Markovics Castle in Arpășel, built in the 19th century (1896), historic monument
