= Drăgănești, Bihor =

Drăgănești
- Commune
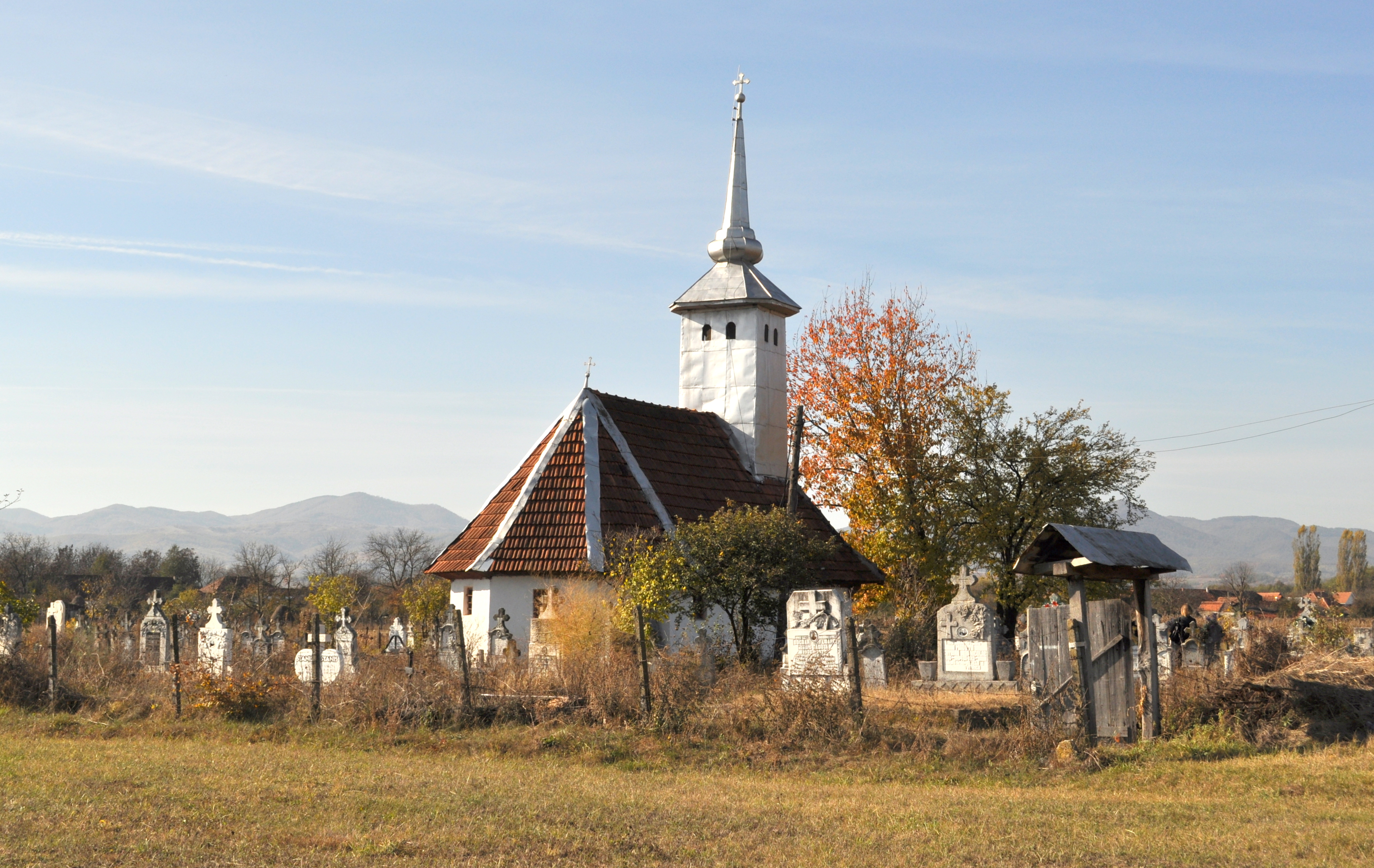
- Wooden church in Belejeni

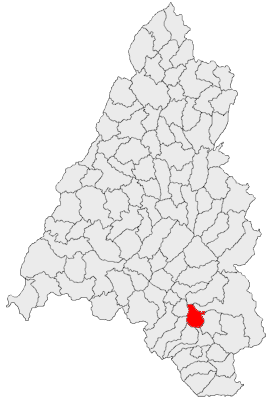
- Location in Bihor County

- Location in Romania
- Coordinates: 46.6291°N 22.3928°E
- Country: Romania
- County: Bihor

Government
  - Mayor (2020–2024): Florina-Mihaela Man (PNL)
- Area: 36.66 km^{2} (14.15 sq mi)
- Elevation: 220 m (720 ft)
- Population (2021-12-01): 2,590
  - Density: 70.6/km^{2} (183/sq mi)
- Time zone: UTC+02:00 (EET)
  - Summer (DST): UTC+03:00 (EEST)
- Postal code: 417250
- Area code: +40 x59
- Vehicle reg.: BH

Drăgănești (Hungarian: Dragánfalva) is a commune in Bihor County, Crișana, Romania. It is composed of ten villages: Belejeni (Belényeshegy), Drăgănești, Grădinari (Kisnyégerfalva), Livada Beiușului (Belényesliváda), Mizieș (Mézes), Păcălești (established 2008), Păntășești (Panatasa), Sebiș (Körössebes), Talpe (Talp), and Țigăneștii de Beiuș (Cigányosd).

The commune lies at the foot of the Apuseni Mountains, on the banks of the Crișul Pietros River. It is located in the southern part of the county, 5 km (3.1 mi) southeast of Beiuș. It is crossed by national road DN76, which runs from the county seat, Oradea, 68 km (42 mi) to the north of Drăgănești, to Deva, 122 km (76 mi) to the south.

At the 2011 census, Drăgănești had a population of 2,967 people. Of those, 87% were Romanians, 7.4% Hungarians, and 2.5% Roma.

== Natives ==
- Traian Dorz (1914–1989), poet, was born and died in Livada Beiușului
- Miron Romanul (1828–1898), cleric of the Romanian Orthodox Church, was born in Mizieș
