= Finiș =

Finiș Várasfenes
- Commune
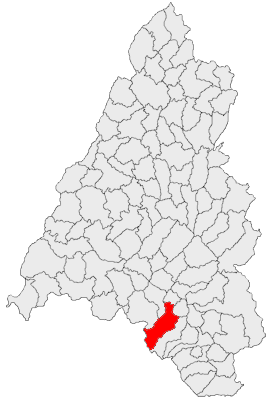
- Location in Bihor County

- Location in Romania
- Coordinates: 46°38′N 22°19′E
- Country: Romania
- County: Bihor
- Population (2021-12-01): 3,245
- Time zone: EET/EEST (UTC+2/+3)
- Vehicle reg.: BH

Finiș (Hungarian: Várasfenes) is a commune in Bihor County, Crișana, Romania, two kilometers from the town of Beiuș. It is composed of five villages: Finiș, Brusturi (Papkútfürdő), Fiziș (Füzes), Ioaniș (Körösjánosfalva) and Șuncuiș (Belényessonkolyos).
