= Tinca =

- Commune
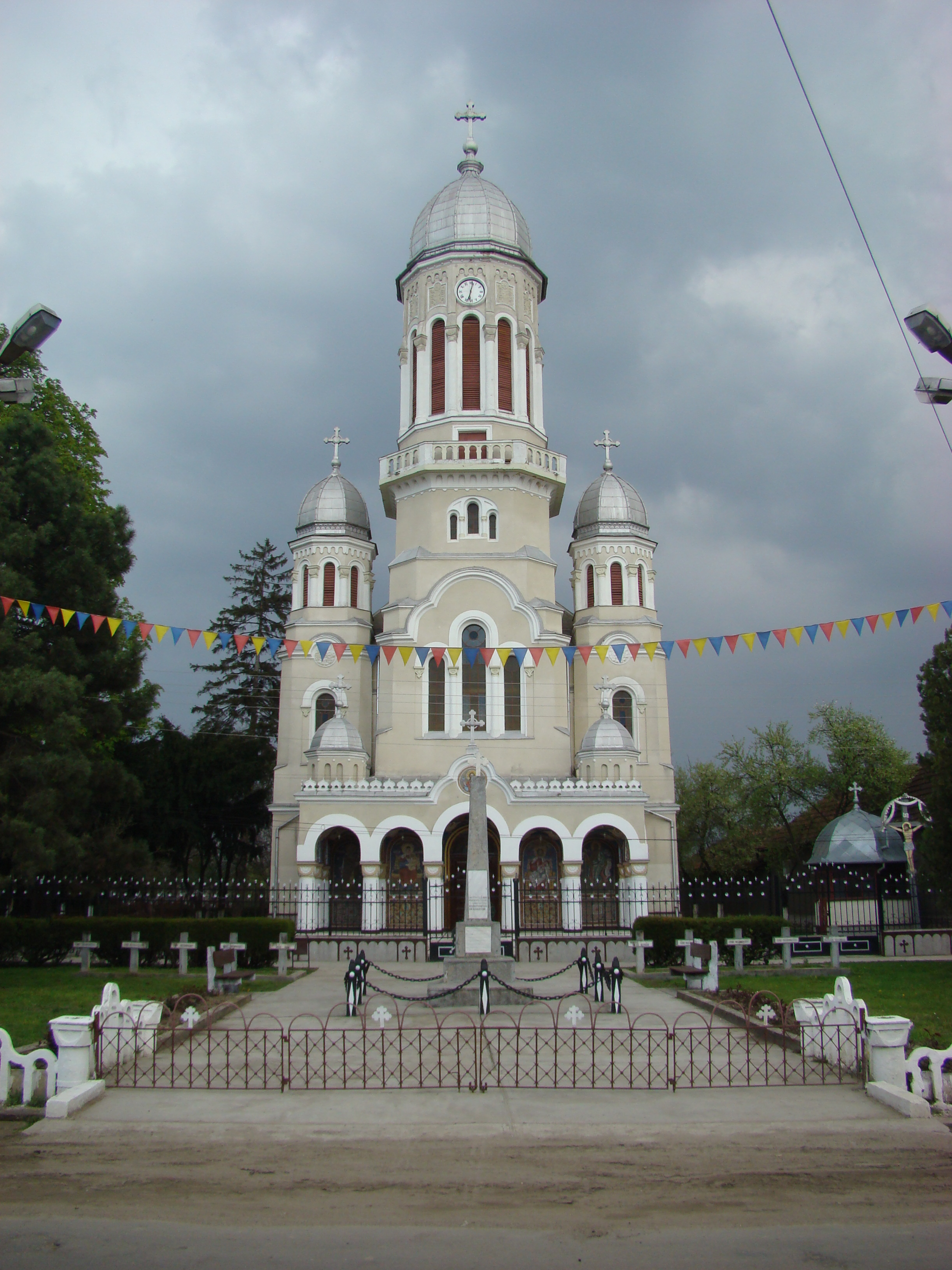
- The new Orthodox church in Tinca village

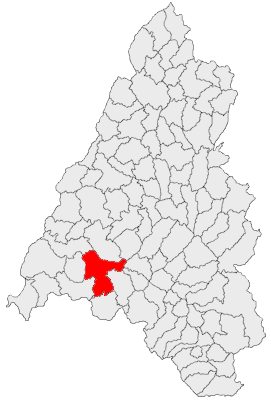
- Location in Bihor County

- Location in Romania
- Coordinates: 46°46′30″N 21°55′50″E
- Country: Romania
- County: Bihor

Government
  - Mayor (2020–2024): Teodor Coste (PNL)
- Area: 141.99 km^{2} (54.82 sq mi)
- Elevation: 130 m (430 ft)
- Population (2021-12-01): 7,429
  - Density: 52.32/km^{2} (135.5/sq mi)
- Time zone: UTC+02:00 (EET)
  - Summer (DST): UTC+03:00 (EEST)
- Postal code: 417595
- Area code: +40 x59
- Vehicle reg.: BH
- Website: www.comuna-tinca.ro

Tinca (Hungarian: Tenke) is a commune in the south-central part of Bihor County, Crișana, Romania. It is composed of five villages: Belfir (Bélfenyér), Gurbediu (Tenkegörbed), Girișu Negru (Feketegyörös), Râpa (Körösmart), and Tinca.

== Historic attestation ==
It was first mentioned as a village in a Papal document in 1338.

== Tourism ==
It is known locally for its magnesium and calcium-rich mineral water springs.

== Geography and climate ==
The average elevation is 130 m (430 ft). Rainfall is about 750 mm (30 in) a year.

== Ethnic structure ==
According to the 2011 census, Tinca commune had a population of 7,793, of which 60% were Romanian, 15% were Hungarian, 15% were Roma, and 10% were other.

== Natives ==
- Marius Vizer (born 1958), former judoka and judo coach, and businessman
