= Budureasa =

- Commune
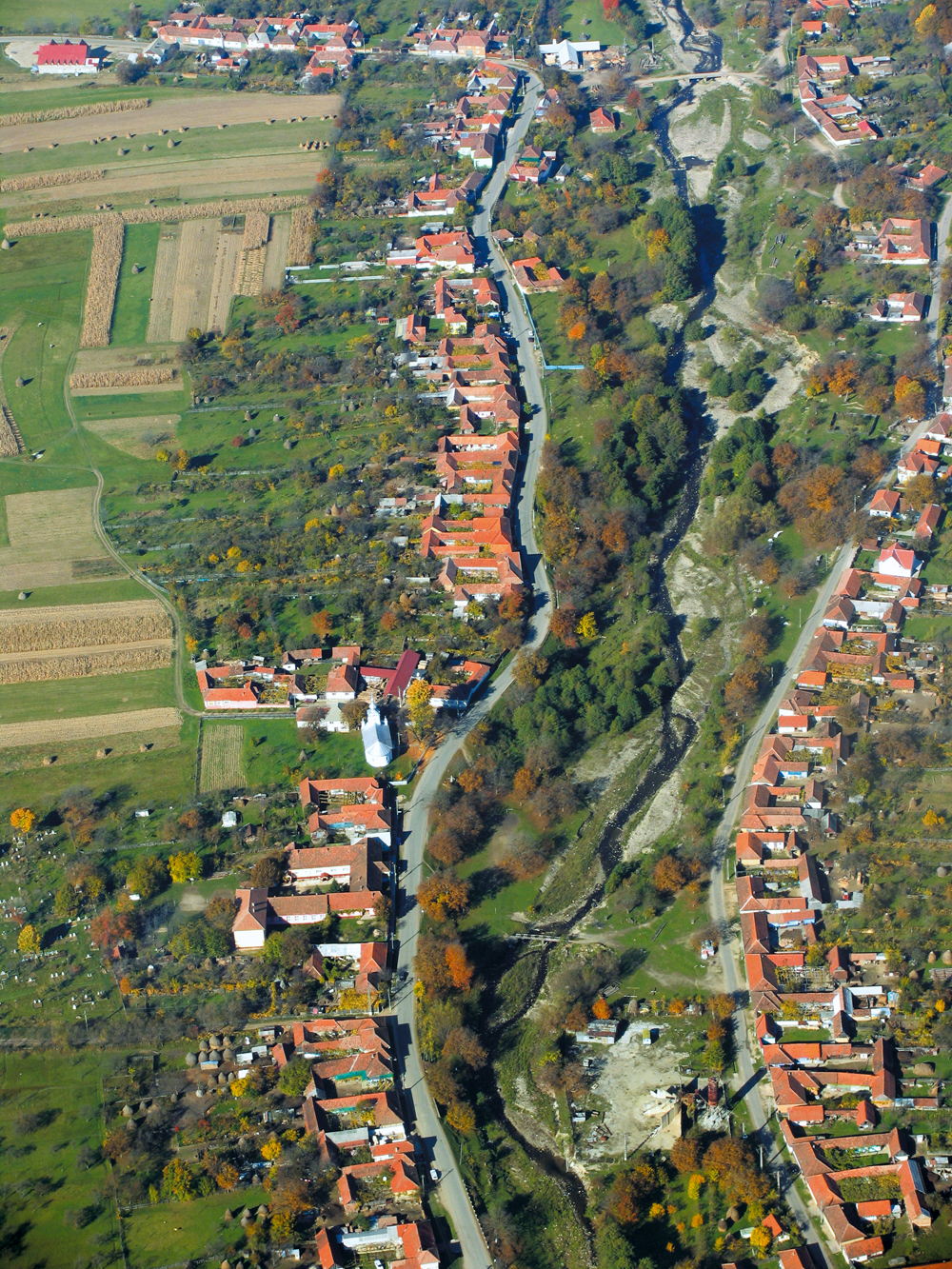
- Aerial view of Budureasa village

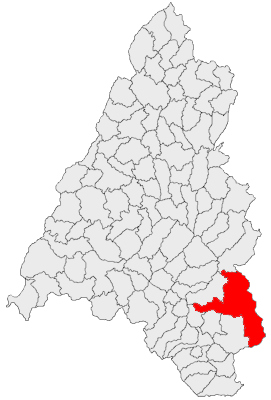
- Location in Bihor County

- Location in Romania
- Coordinates: 46°40′N 22°30′E
- Country: Romania
- County: Bihor

Government
  - Mayor (2020–2024): Adrian-Marius Magda (PSD)
- Area: 346.46 km^{2} (133.77 sq mi)
- Elevation: 352 m (1,155 ft)
- Highest elevation: 1,100 m (3,600 ft)
- Population (2021-12-01): 2,553
  - Density: 7.369/km^{2} (19.09/sq mi)
- Time zone: UTC+02:00 (EET)
  - Summer (DST): UTC+03:00 (EEST)
- Postal code: 417100
- Area code: +(40) x59
- Vehicle reg.: BH
- Website: www.budureasa.ro

Budureasa (Hungarian: Bondoraszó, German: Buderatz) is a commune in Bihor County, Crișana, Romania with a population of 2,553 as of 2021. It is composed of five villages: Budureasa, Burda (Borda), Saca (Száka), Săliște de Beiuș (Belényesszeleste), and Teleac (Telek). The Stâna de Vale resort is located in the commune.

The commune is situated in the foothills of the Vlădeasa and Pădurea Craiului mountains (part of the Apuseni Mountains); the western reaches of the Apuseni Natural Park lie on its administrative territory. Budureasa is located on the southeastern part of Bihor County, 11 km (6.8 mi) east of the city of Beiuș and 72 km (45 mi) southeast of the county seat, Oradea.
