= Rieni =

- Commune
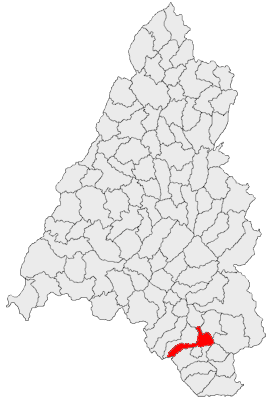
- Location in Bihor County

- Location in Romania
- Coordinates: 46°34′N 22°27′E
- Country: Romania
- County: Bihor
- Population (2021-12-01): 2,549
- Time zone: EET/EEST (UTC+2/+3)
- Vehicle reg.: BH

Rieni (Hungarian: Rény) is a commune in Bihor County, Crișana, Romania with a population of 3,050 people. It is composed of six villages: Cucuceni (Kakucsány), Ghighișeni (Gyegyesény), Petrileni (Petrelény), Rieni, Sudrigiu (Kisszedres) and Valea de Jos (Alsófeketevölgy).

== Natives ==
- Vasile Blaga (born 1956), politician
