= Crișana =

Crișana Crișana (Romanian) Körösvidék (Hungarian) Kreischgebiet (German)
- Historical region of Romania
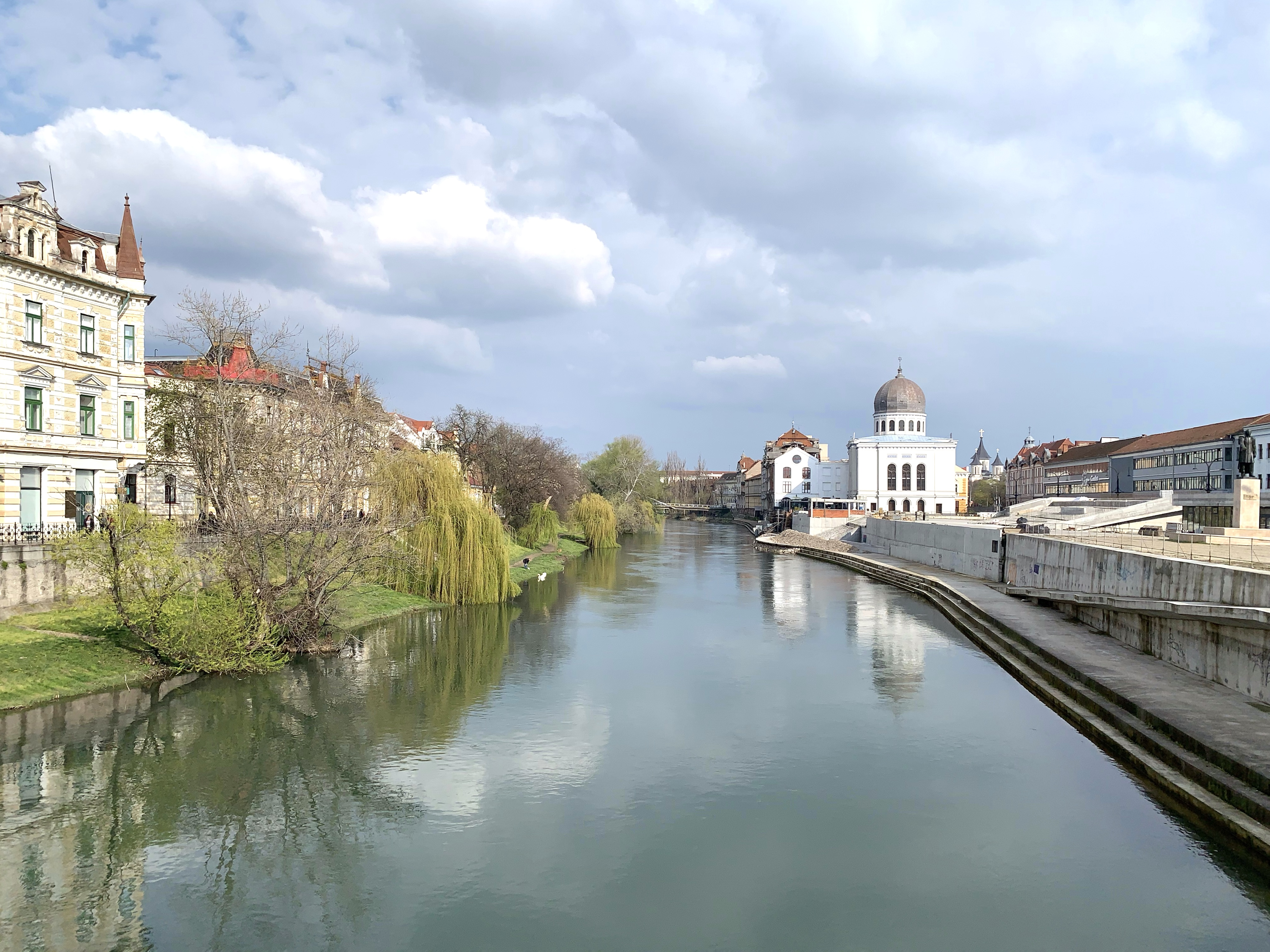
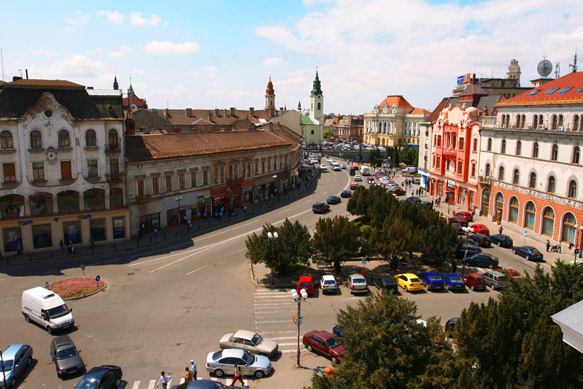
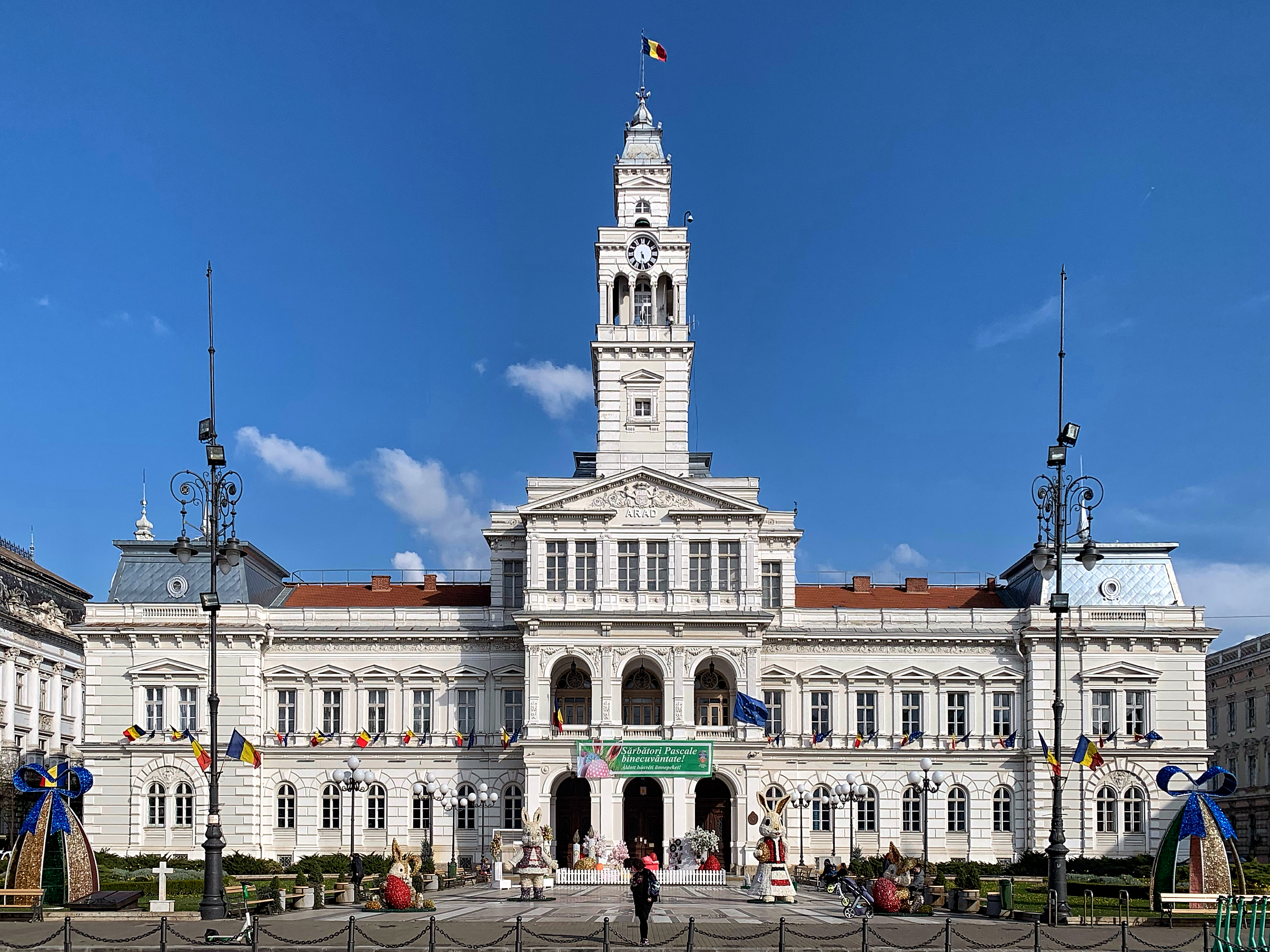
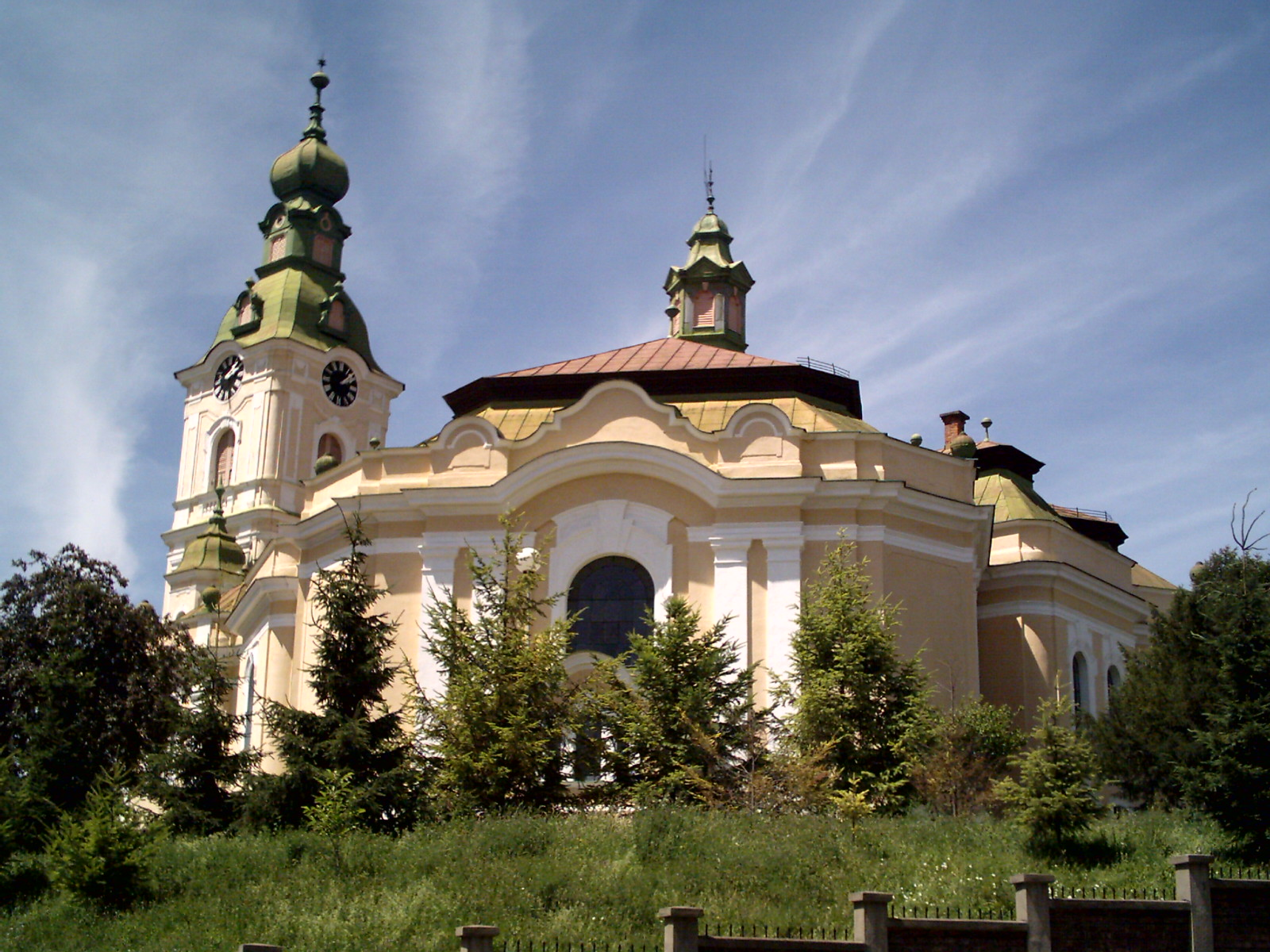
- Crișul Repede River Oradea Arad Zalău Reformed Church

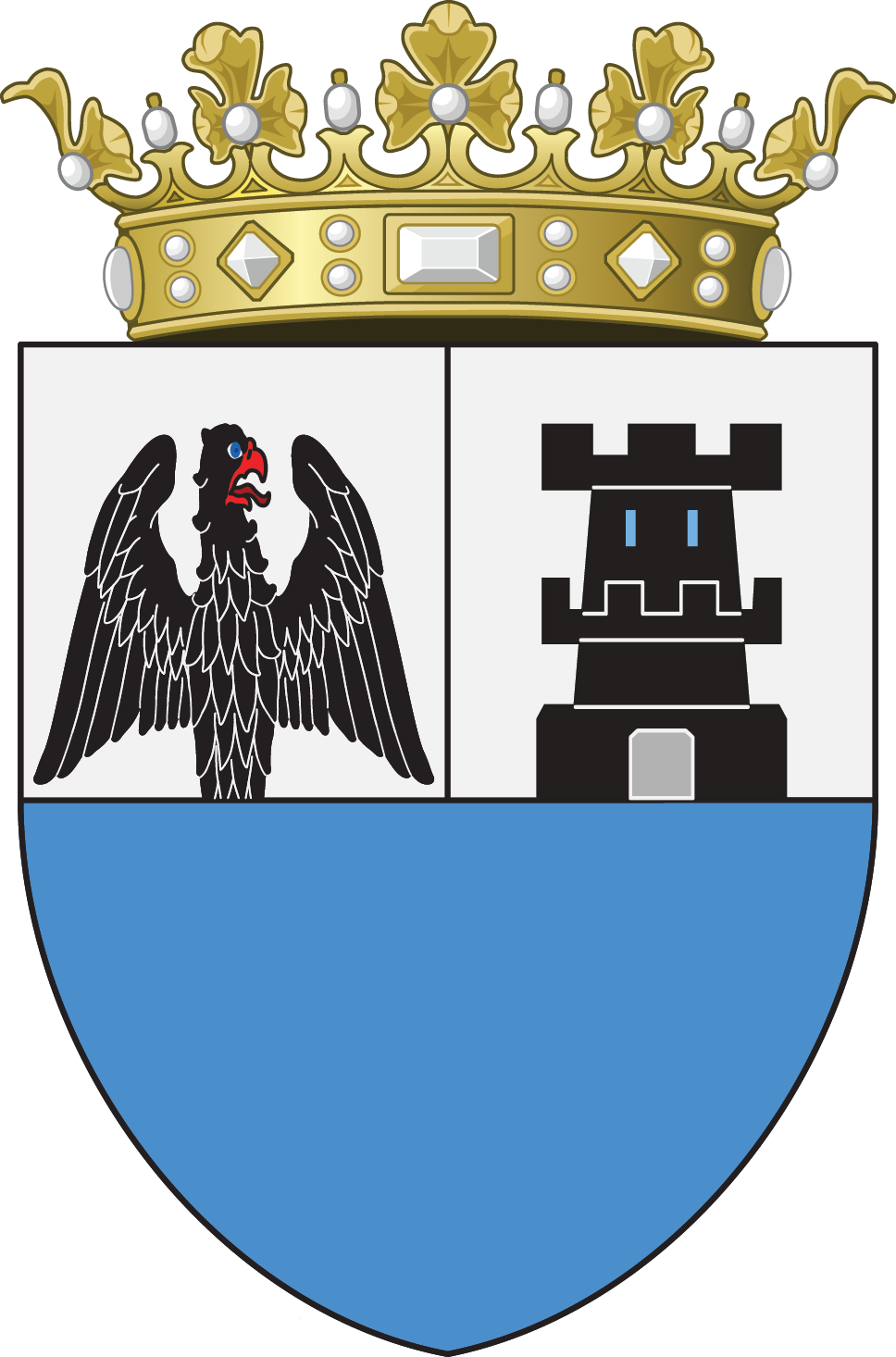
- Coat of arms

- Crișana in Romania
- Country: Romania
- Largest city: Oradea
- Time zone: UTC+2 (EET)
  - Summer (DST): UTC+3 (EEST)

Crișana (Romanian: Crișana, Hungarian: Körösvidék, German: Kreischgebiet) is a geographical and historical region of Romania named after the Criș (Körös) River and its three tributaries: the Crișul Alb, Crișul Negru, and Crișul Repede. In Romania, the term is sometimes extended to include areas beyond the border, in Hungary; in this interpretation, the region is bounded to the east by the Apuseni Mountains, to the south by the Mureș River, to the north by the Someș River, and to the west by the Tisza River, the Romanian-Hungarian border cutting it in two. However, in Hungary, the area between the Tisza River and the Romanian border is usually known as Tiszántúl.

== History ==
=== Ancient history ===
In ancient times, this area was settled by Celts, Dacians, Sarmatians, and Germanic peoples. In the first century BC, it was part of the Dacian Kingdom under Burebista.

=== Middle Ages ===
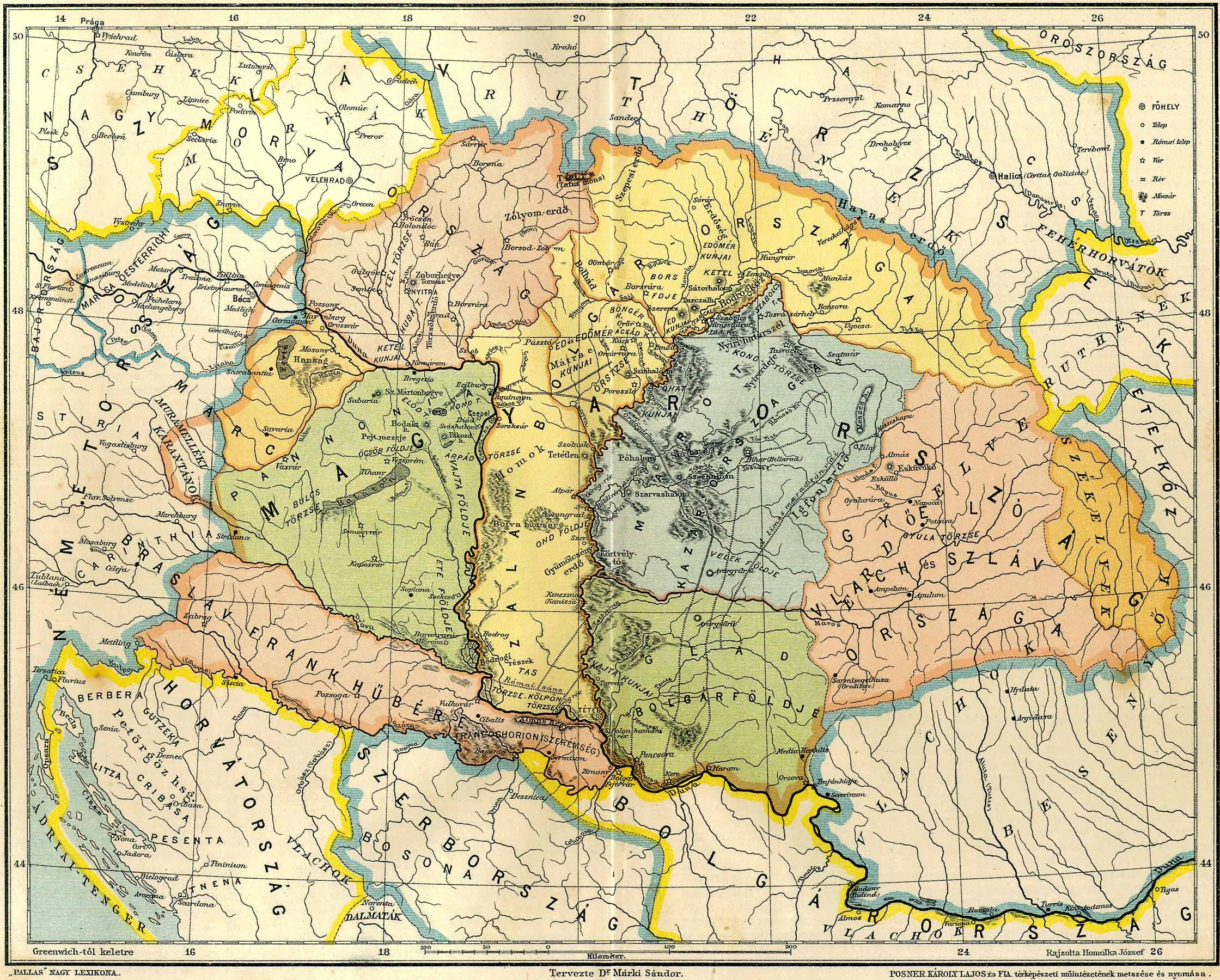
Crișana ("Kazár-országa" or Khazars' Land) in blue on a Hungarian map (from the 1890s) based on the Gesta Hungarorum

In the Middle Ages, it was ruled by the Hunnic Empire, the Kingdom of the Gepids, the Avar Empire, the Bulgarian Empire and the Kingdom of Hungary.

Hungarian maps based on the Gesta Hungarorum call it Kazárország. According to Simon of Keza's 13th C. Gesta Hunnorum et Hungarorum, the same area was ruled (under Zvataplug son of Morout), by Morout's grandson Menumorout (Stallion of Morout) in the 10th century. Morout was a Prince of Poland who had supposedly subdued Bractari and ruled as Emperor of the Bulgars and Moravians. Prince Morout occupied Crișana and the people that are called Cozar inhabited that land in reference to the Cozlones of Kusaly. Prince Morout's son Zvataplug appears to have been the father of Prince Morout's grandson Menumorout who succeeded Zvataplug, and —after the Franks murdered Chussol— wed his daughter to Árpád's son Zoltán of Hungary father of Taksony of Hungary.

The largest city in the region, Oradea (Hungarian: Nagyvárad), was most probably established during the early years of Hungarian rule. It is first mentioned in 1113 under the name "Varadinum" in a diploma belonging to Benedictine Zobor Abbey. The Romanian name Oradea originates from the Hungarian name Várad, meaning "fortified place". The city was one of the most important cultural centres of the medieval Hungarian state: two Hungarian kings, Ladislaus I (1077-1095) and Sigismund (1387-1437) were buried there. After the canonization of Ladislaus I in 1192, his shrine at Várad became a Catholic pilgrimage site.

=== Modern history ===
After the Fall of Belgrade (1521) and Battle of Mohács (1526), the region became part of the Eastern Hungarian Kingdom. In 1552, the Ottoman Empire occupied the southern part of Crișana and included it in the newly established Ottoman province Temeşvar Eyalet. According to the Treaty of Speyer (1570), the rest of Crișana became part of the Principality of Transylvania, a successor state of the Eastern Hungarian Kingdom. John Sigismund Zápolya abdicated as King of Hungary and in return, Maximilian II of Habsburg recognized John Sigismund's authority over the eastern territories of the Kingdom of Hungary. John Sigismund became princeps Transsylvaniae et partium regni Hungariae dominus – Prince of Transylvania and of a part of the Kingdom of Hungary (Partium). Crișana was included in the Partium.

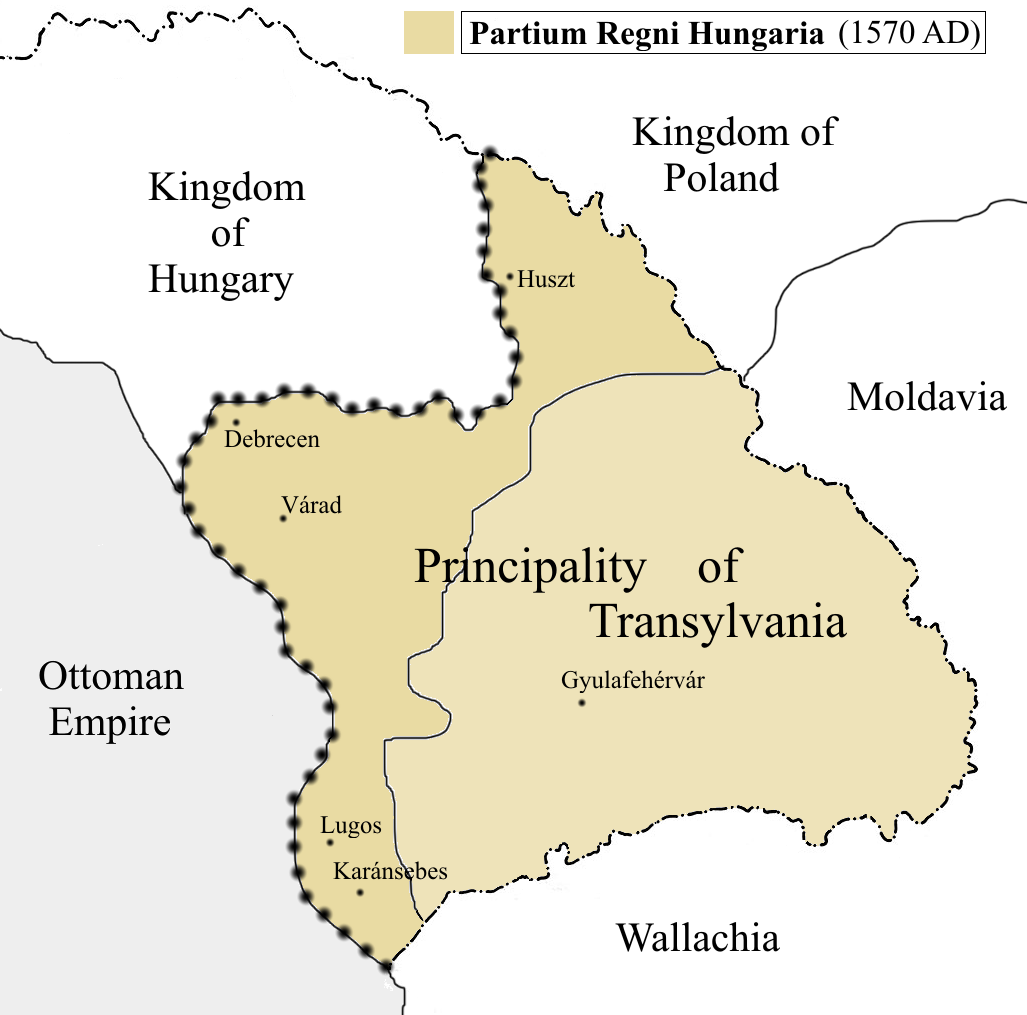
Partium within the Principality of Transylvania in 1570

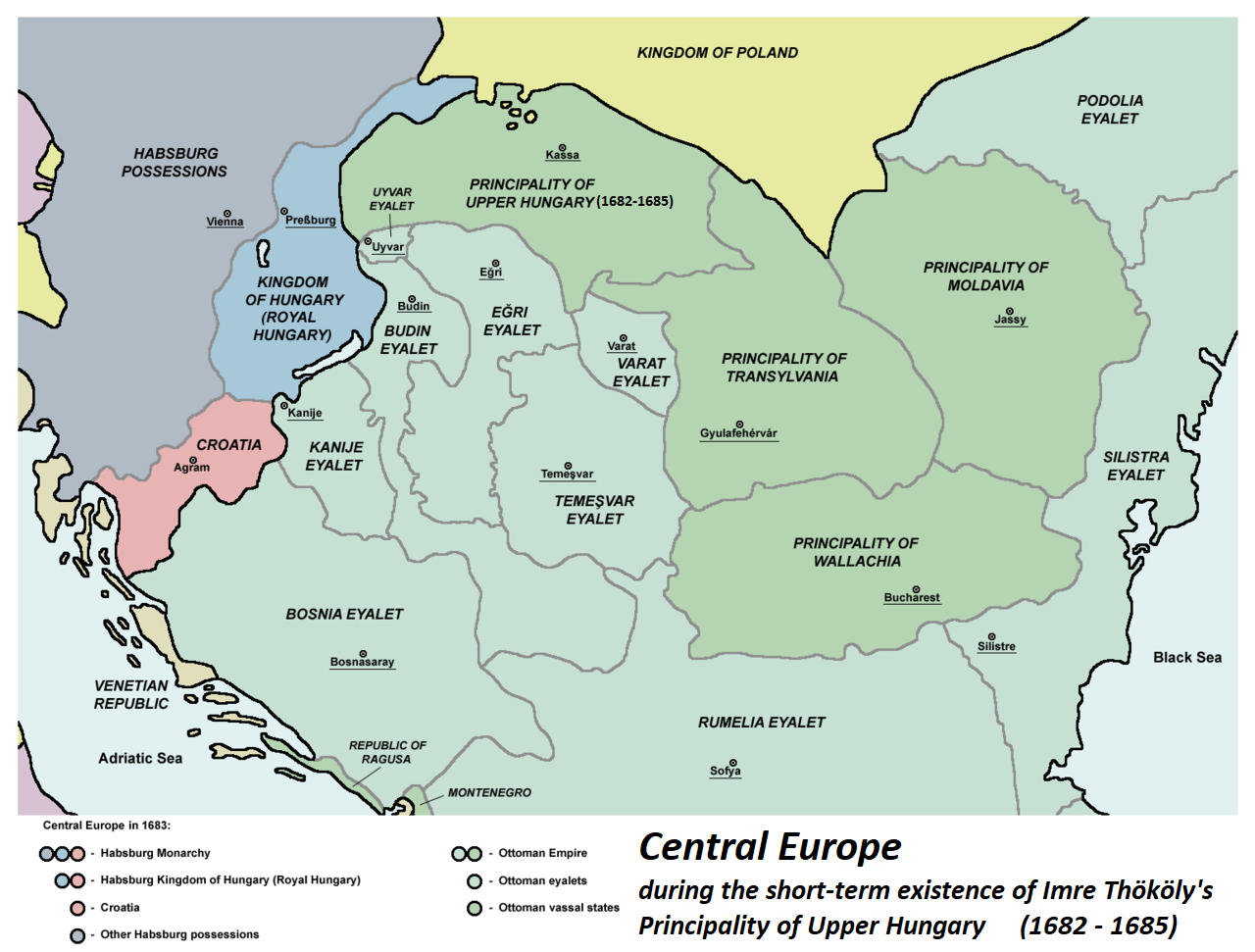
Crișana under Ottoman rule in 1683

The Ottoman Varat Eyalet that was formed in the second half of the 17th century was centered on Crișana. Since the end of the 17th century, the whole region became part of the lands of the Habsburg monarchy and was administratively divided between the Habsburg Kingdom of Hungary, the Habsburg Principality of Transylvania and the Habsburg Military Frontier.

Following the abolition of the Theiß-Muresch section of the Habsburg Military Frontier (in 1750) and the abolition of the Principality of Transylvania in 1867, the whole area was included again into the Kingdom of Hungary, which was then part of the dual monarchy of Austria-Hungary. During Habsburg administration, Crișana did not, on the whole, have special status such as that of Transylvania or the Banat; briefly, from 1850 to 1860, it was organized as the Military District of Großwardein. After disintegration of the Austro-Hungarian Empire in 1918, Crișana was divided between Romania (eastern part) and Hungary (western part) by the Treaty of Trianon in 1920.

== Geography ==
Romanian Crișana is located within the Pannonian Basin and bounded in Romania by Maramureș to the north, Transylvania proper to the east, Banat to the south, and Hungary to the west. The region consists of the current Romanian counties of Arad (most of it), Bihor and some parts of Sălaj, Satu Mare, parts of Maramureș County (Codru, Chioar) and Hunedoara counties. Nowadays it is sometimes considered part of the historical region Transylvania, although it did not fall fully within the boundaries of the historical principality.

Hungarian Körösvidék is covered by the areas of Hajdú-Bihar County and Békés County. The southern part of Crișana, near the Mureș River, was called Pomorišje by the Serbs.

== Cities ==
The most important cities are:

- Zalău, Oradea, Arad, Salonta, and Beiuș (in Romania)
- Debrecen, Békéscsaba, and Gyula (in Hungary)

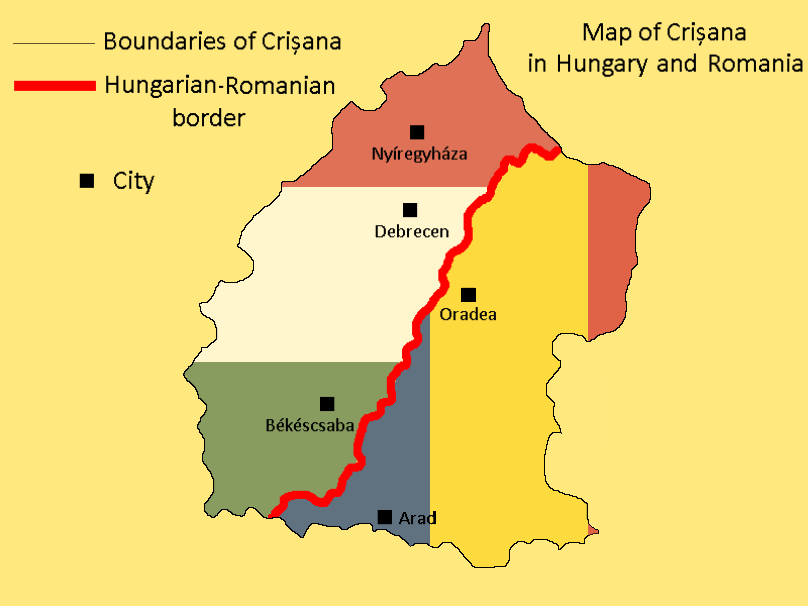
Map of Crișana in Hungary and Romania

== Gallery ==
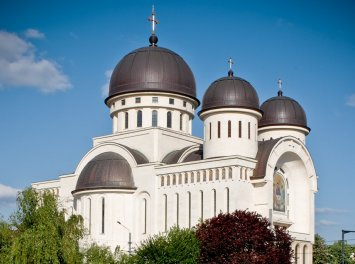
Arad - Orthodox Cathedral

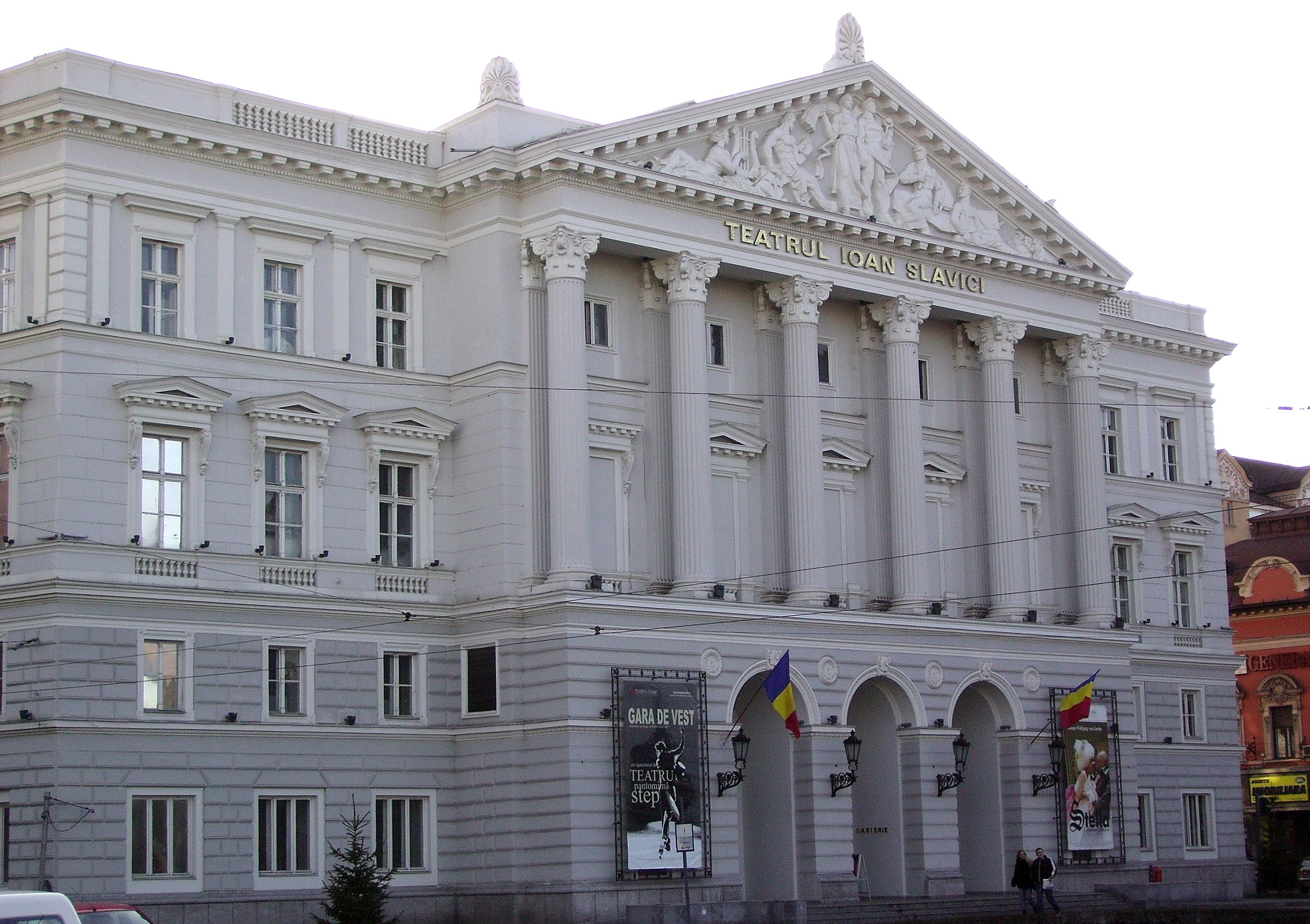
Arad - Ioan Slavici - Classic Theatre

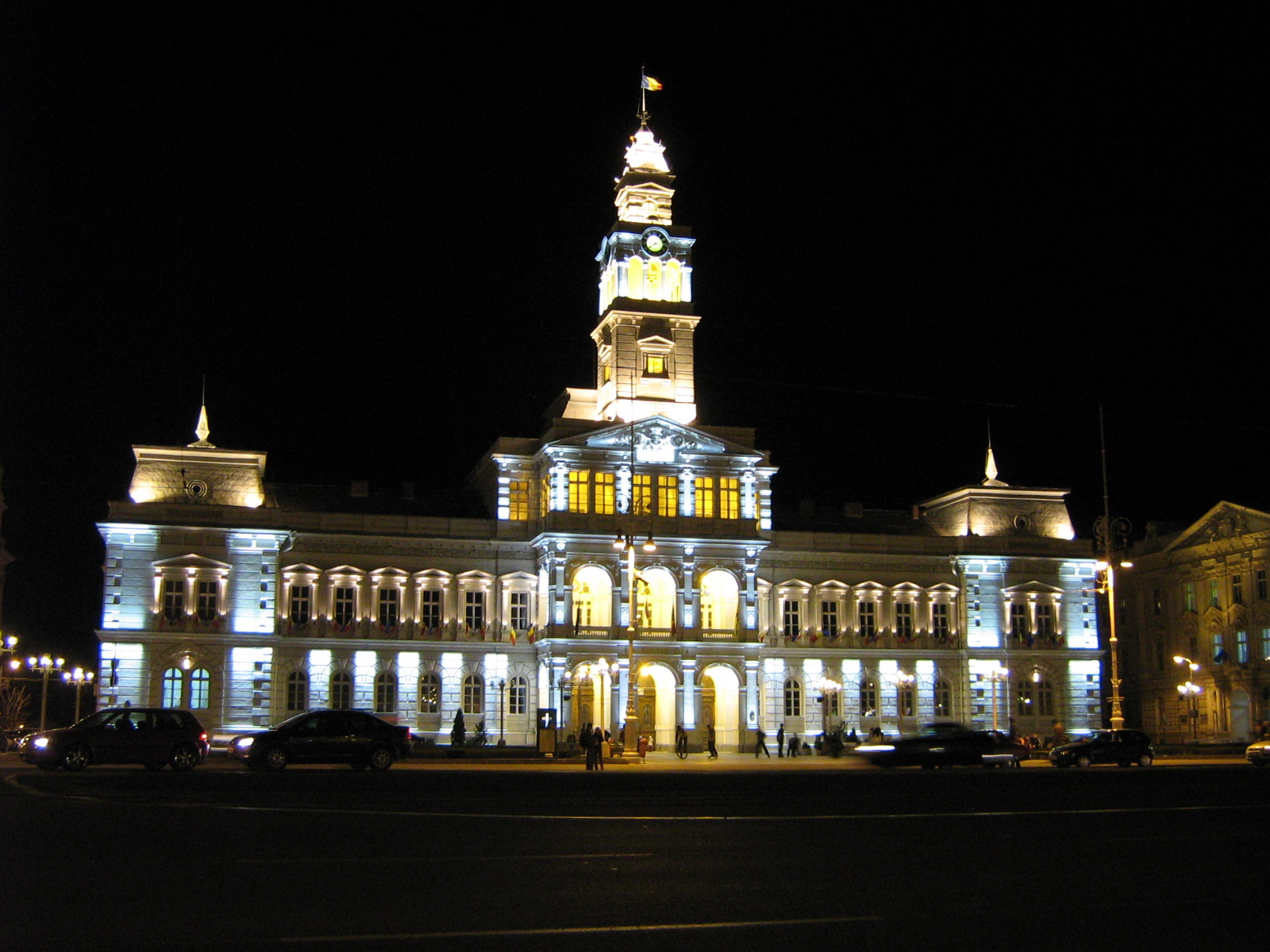
Arad - Administration Palace

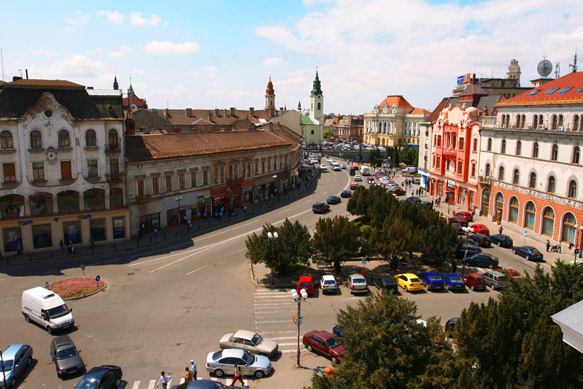
Oradea - The Ferdinand Square

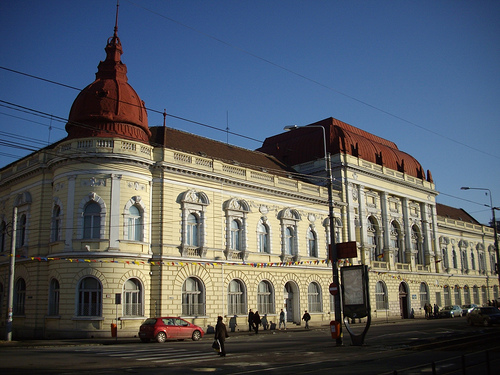
Oradea - The Faculty of Medicine

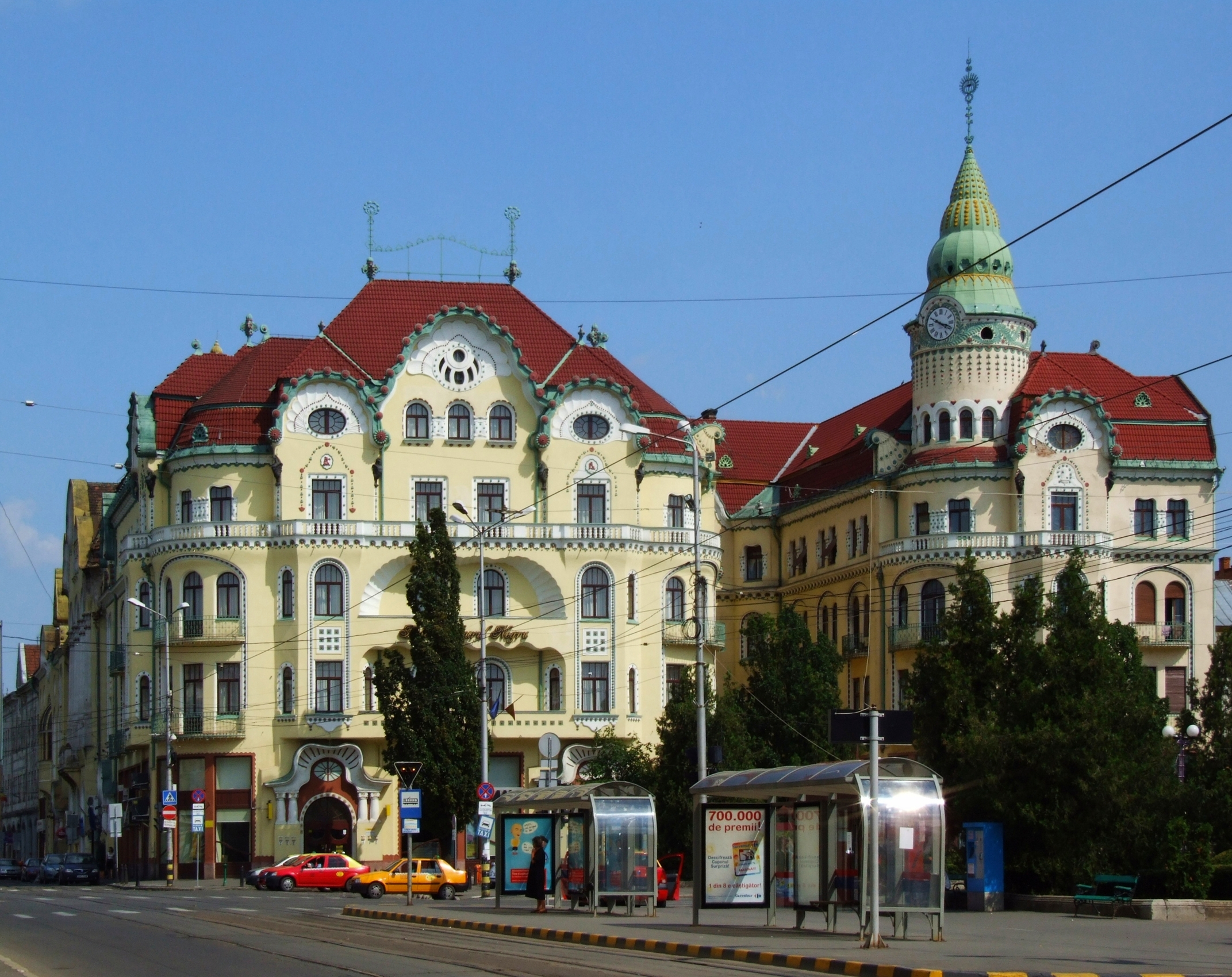
Oradea - The Black Eagle Palace

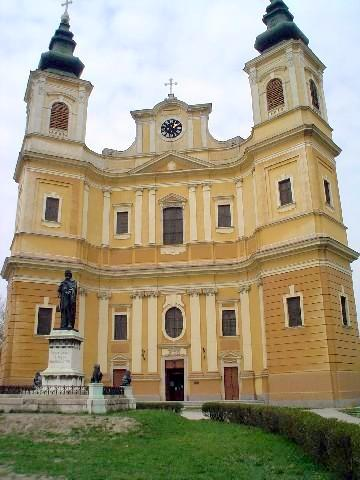
Oradea - Baroque Roman Catholic cathedral

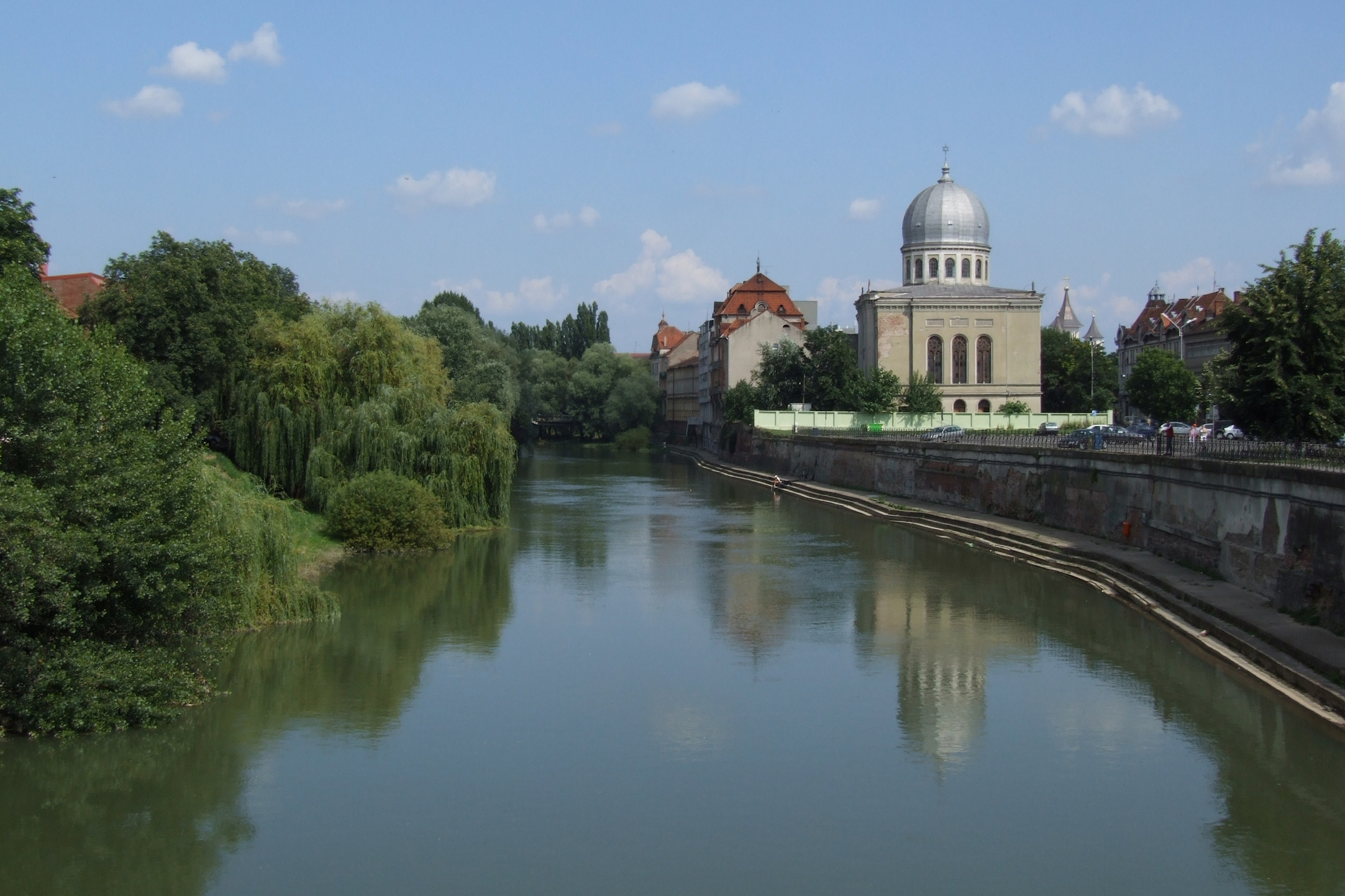
Oradea - The Crişul Repede river

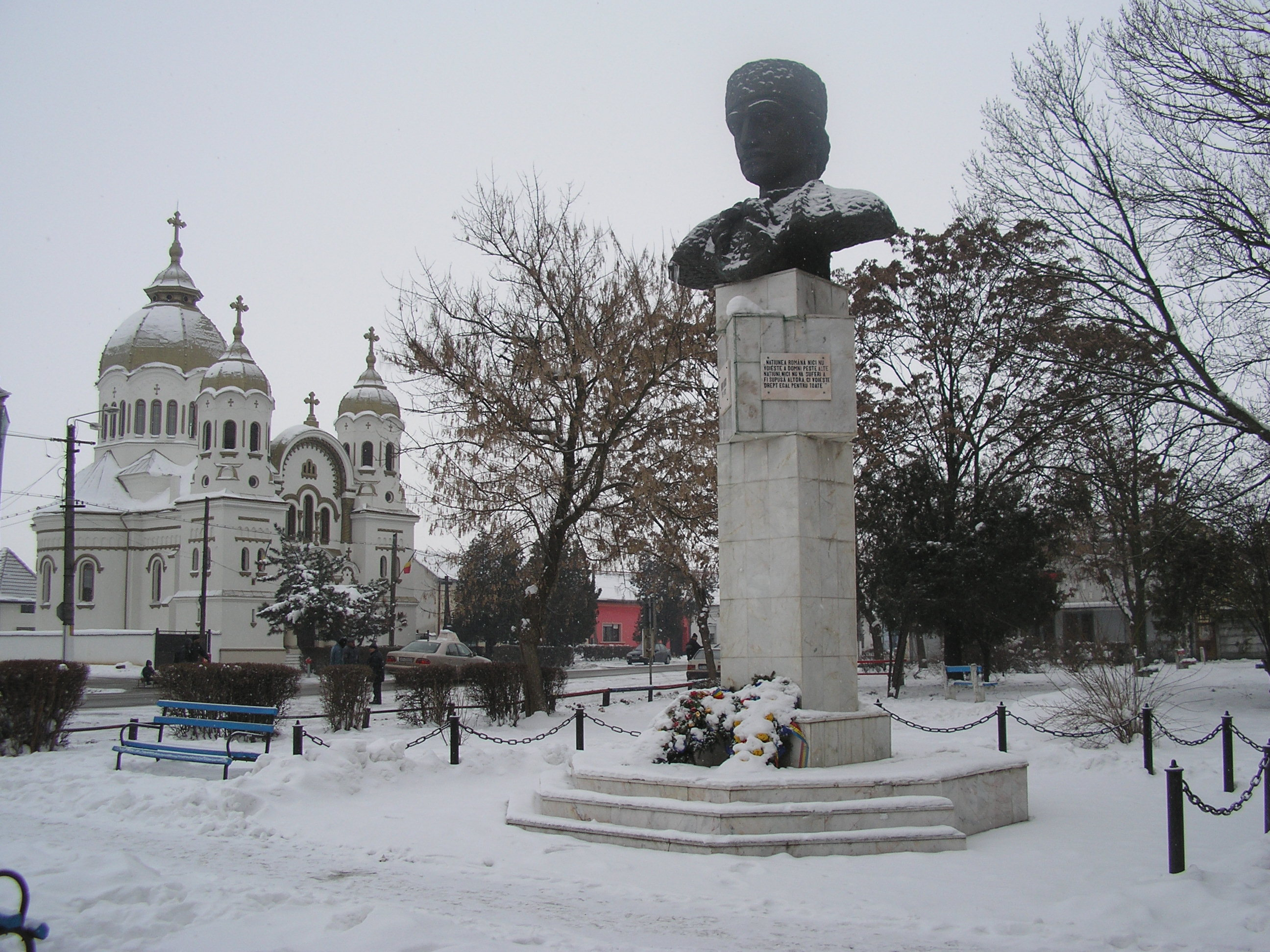
Salonta - Orthodox Church

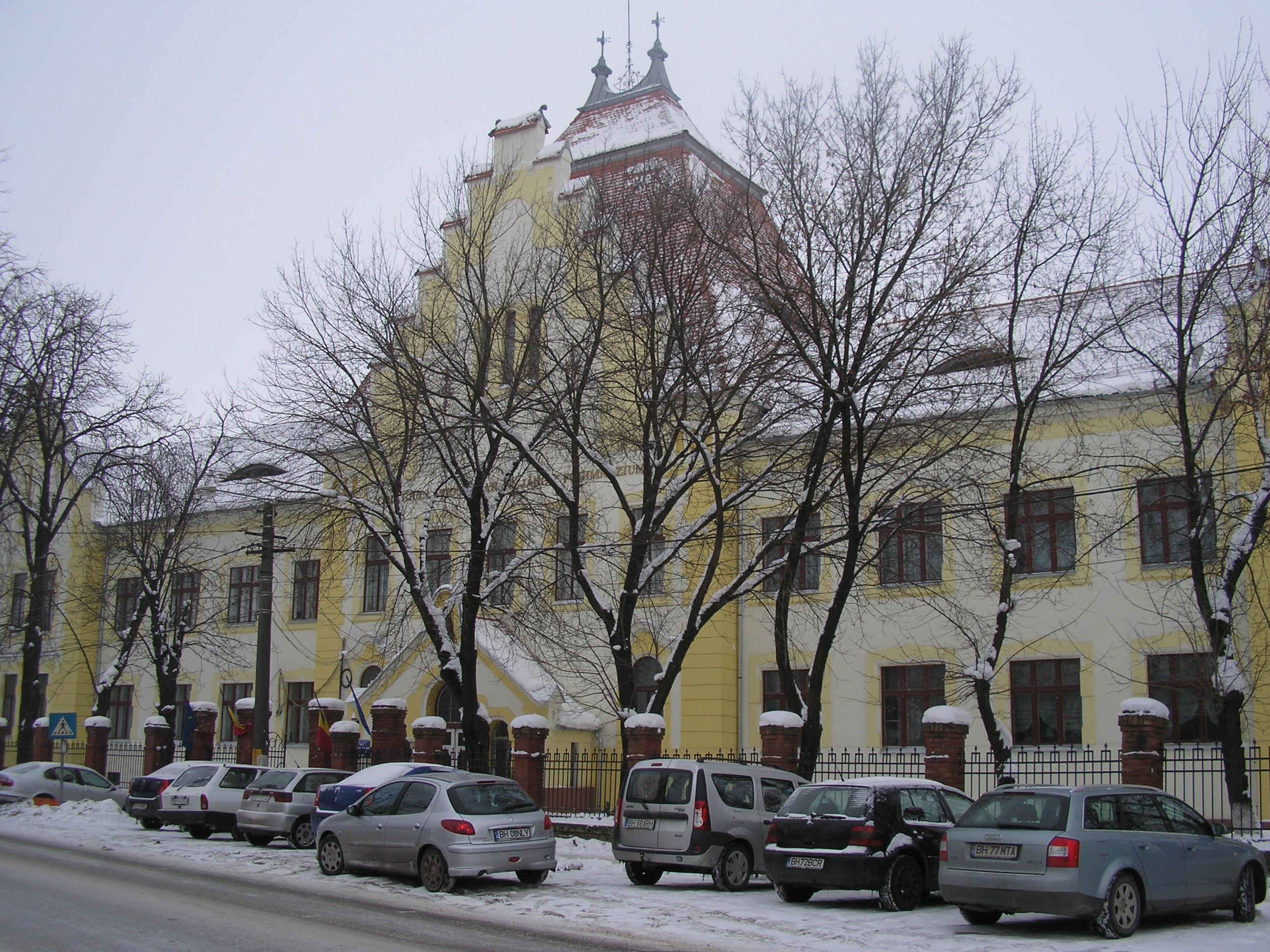
Salonta - Arany Janos High School

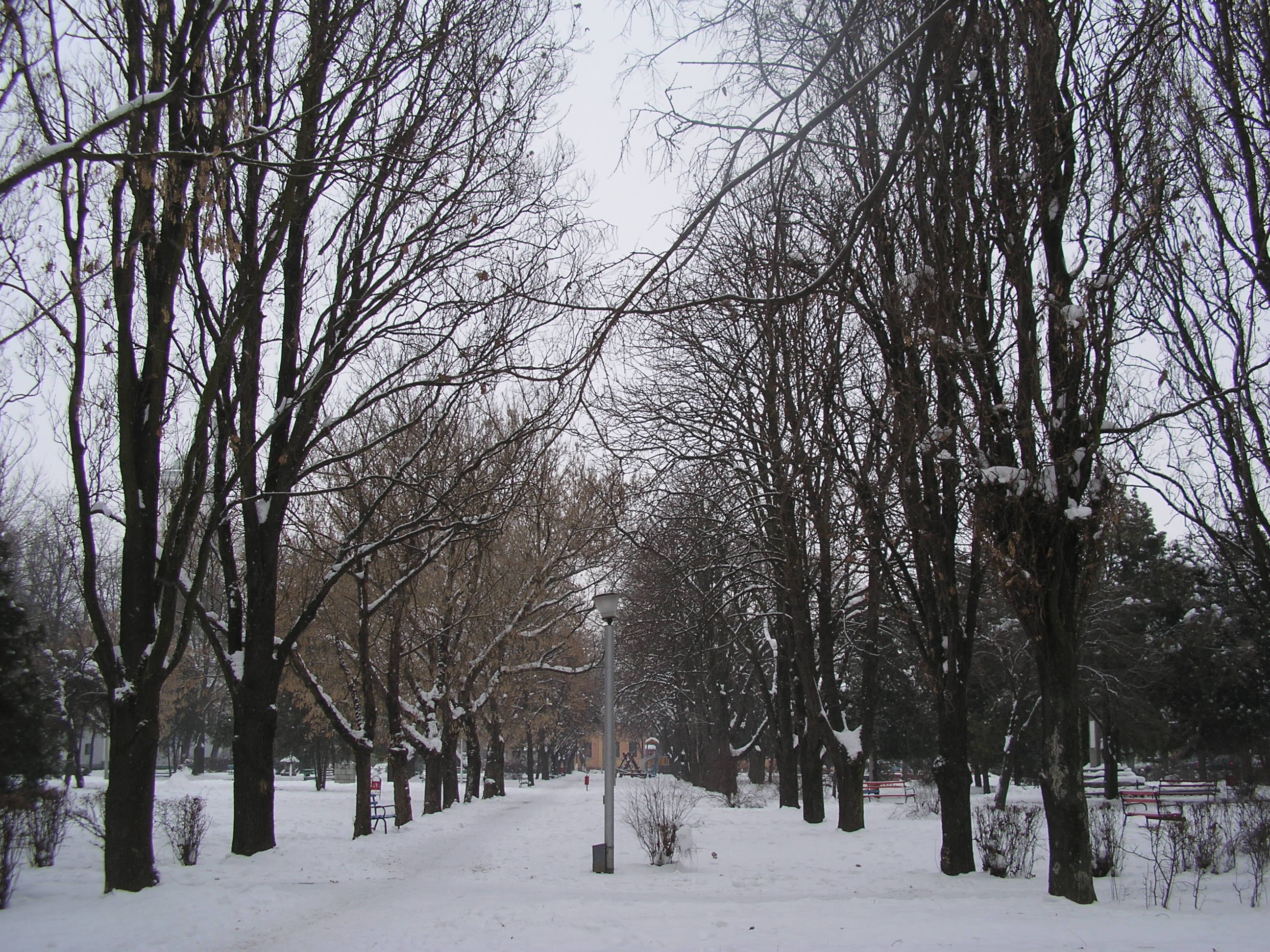
Salonta - The central park

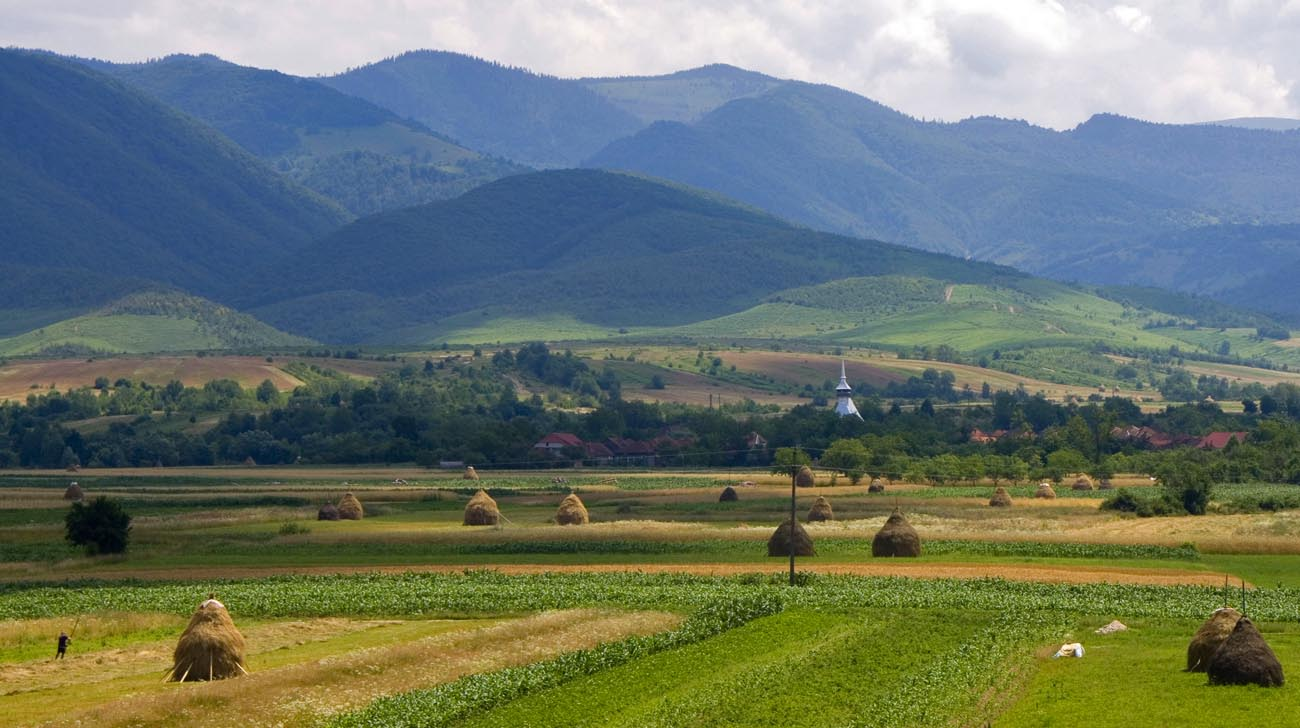
Wooden church in Brădet

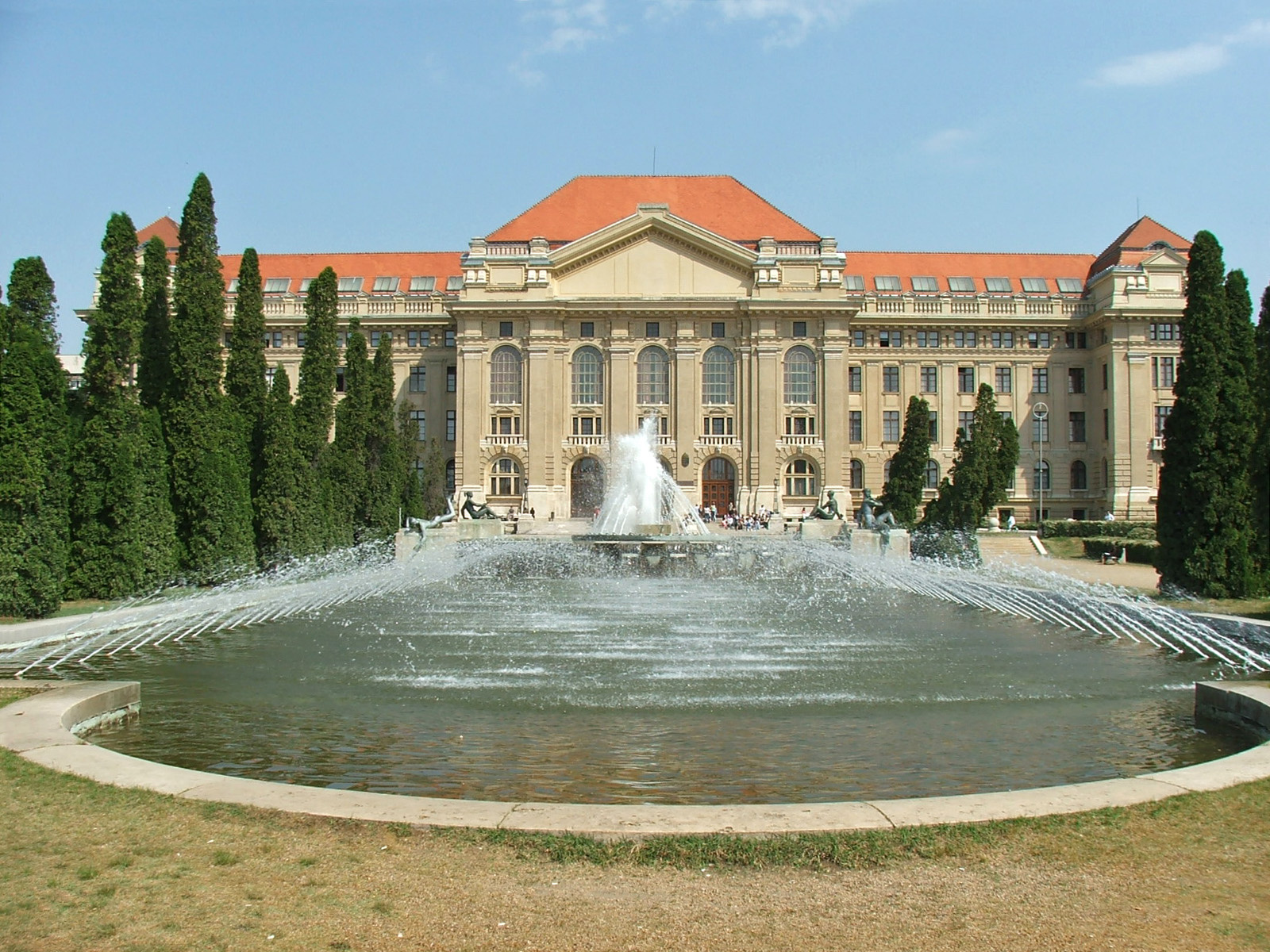
Debrecen

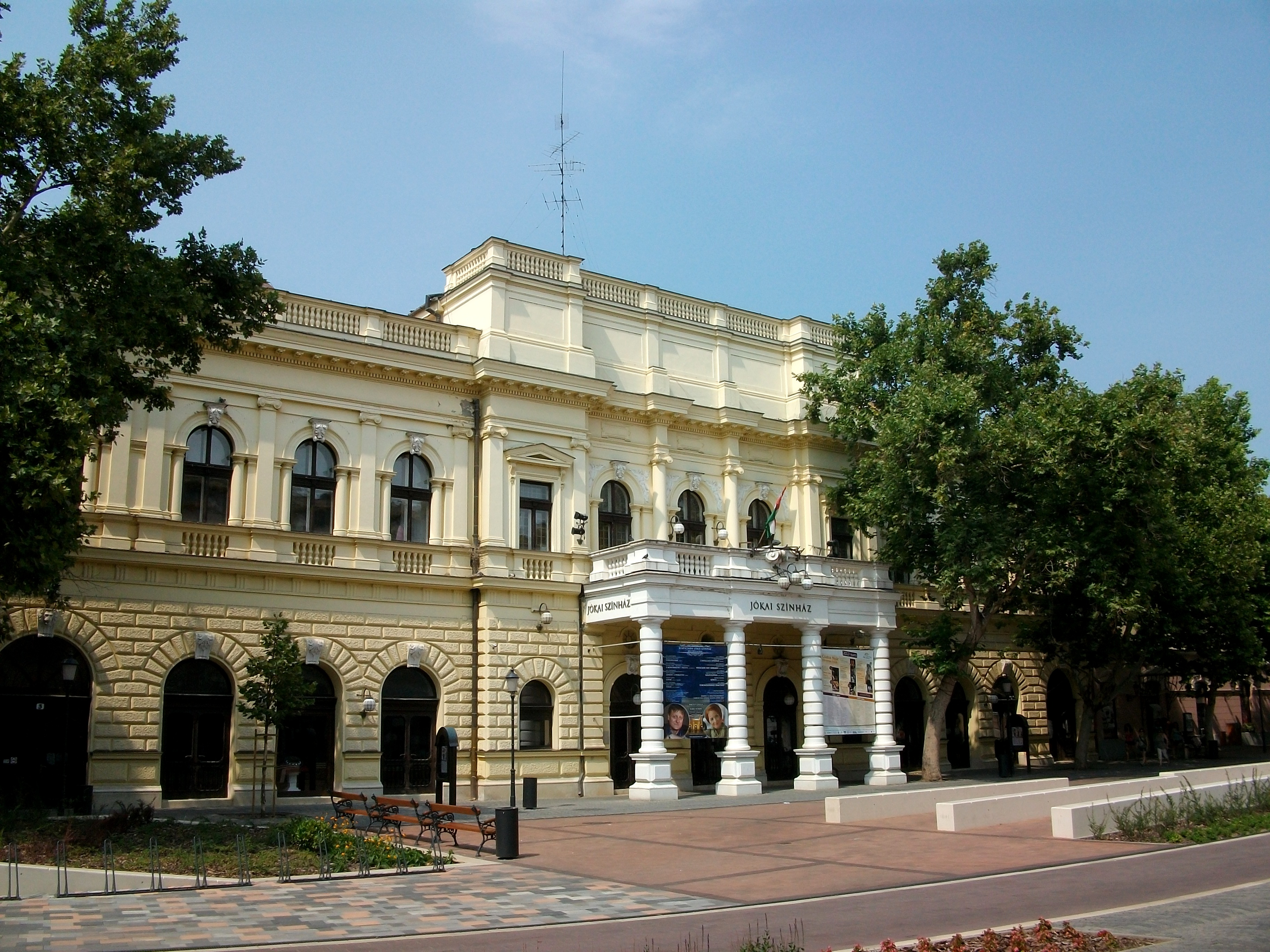
Bekescsaba theater

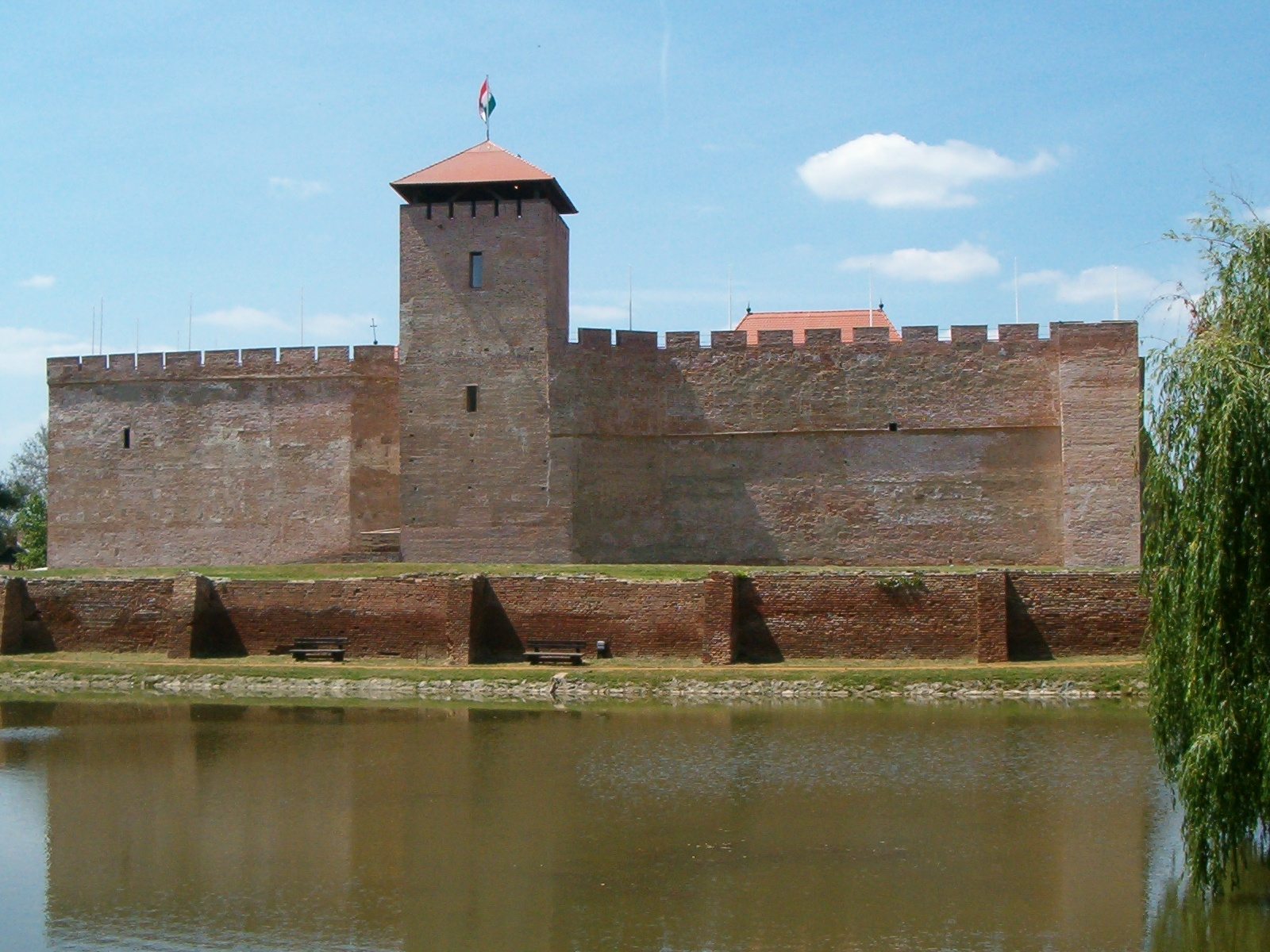
Gyula castle

== See also ==
- Partium
