= Körös =

River in Hungary

Körös (Hung.) Criș (Rom.)
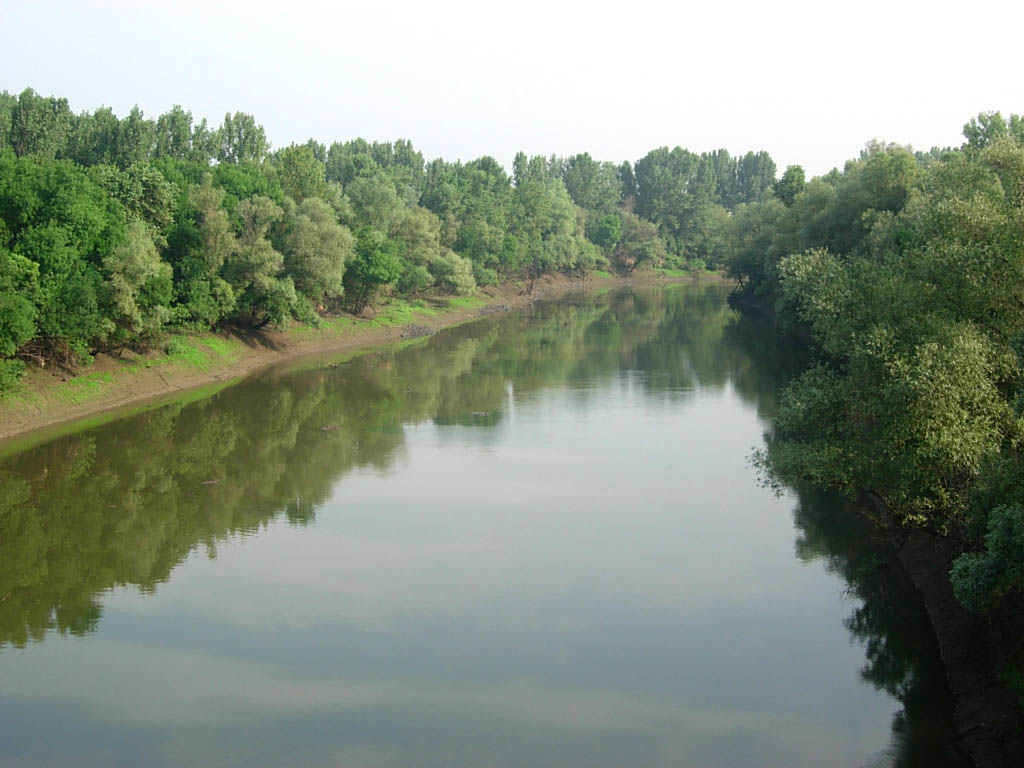
- The Körös near Kunszentmárton

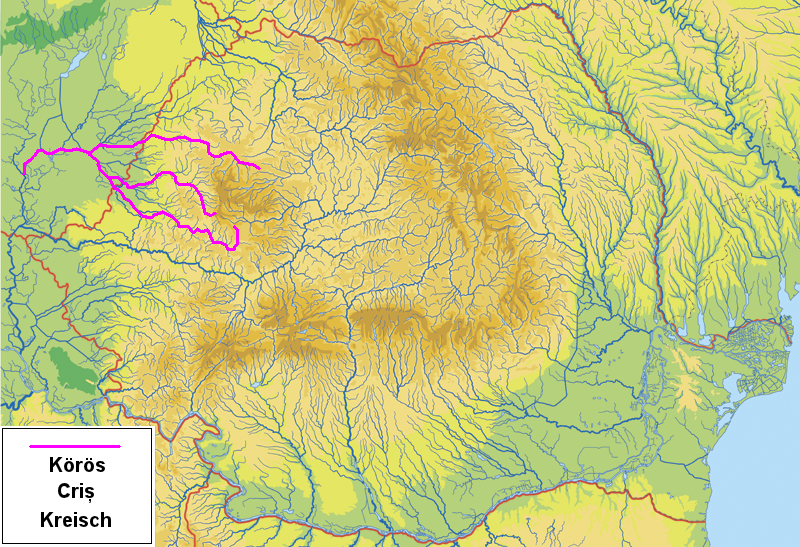
- Course of the Körös (interactive map)

Location
- Countries: Hungary
- Counties: Békés; Jász-Nagykun-Szolnok; Csongrád
- Towns: Békés; Szarvas

Physical characteristics
- Source: Confluence of headwaters Crișul Alb and Crișul Negru
  - location: near Gyula
  - coordinates: 46°42′1″N 21°16′9″E
  - elevation: 85 m (279 ft)
- Mouth: Tisza
  - location: near Csongrád
  - coordinates: 46°43′2″N 20°11′18″E
  - elevation: 80 m (260 ft)
- Length: 128.6 km (79.9 mi) (Körös–Kettős-Körös–Fehér-Körös: 363 km)
- Basin size: 27,537 km^{2} (10,632 mi^{2})
- Discharge
  - location: Csongrád (near mouth)
  - average: (Period: 1971–2000)115.9 m^{3}/s (4,090 cu ft/s)

Basin features
- Progression: Tisza→ Danube→ Black Sea
- Tributaries
  - left: Fehér-Körös
  - right: Fekete-Körös, Sebes-Körös, Hortobágy

The Körös (Hungarian pronunciation: [ˈkørøʃ]) or Criș (Romanian pronunciation: ['kriʃ]), German: Kreisch, is a river in eastern Hungary. Its length is 128.6 km (79.9 mi) from the confluence of its two source rivers, Fehér-Körös (Crișul Alb) and Fekete-Körös (Crișul Negru) to its outflow into the Tisza. Its drainage basin has an area of 27,537 km^{2} (10,632 sq mi) and is situated in northwest Romania and eastern Hungary. It has three source rivers, all with their origin in the Apuseni Mountains in Transylvania, Romania: Crișul Alb (Fehér-Körös), Crișul Negru (Fekete-Körös) and Crișul Repede (Sebes-Körös). The confluence of the rivers Fehér-Körös (Crișul Alb) and Fekete-Körös (Crișul Negru) is near the town of Gyula. The Körös downstream from Gyula is also called the Kettős-Körös (Hungarian for "double Körös"). 37.3 km further downstream, near Gyomaendrőd, the Sebes-Körös (Crișul Repede) joins the Körös/Criș. The section downstream from Gyomaendrőd is also called the Hármas-Körös (Hungarian for "triple Körös"). The Körös flows into the Tisza River near Csongrád in Csongrád county.

It was known in antiquity as the Gerasus, Cusus, Gresia or Grissia.
