= Cârpeștii Mici =

- Location within Romania

Location
- Country: Romania
- Counties: Bihor County
- Villages: Stracoș, Bucium, Ceica, Dușești, Zăvoiu

Physical characteristics
- Source: Poiana Tășad
  - coordinates: 46°56′05″N 22°07′44″E
  - elevation: 293 m (961 ft)
- Mouth: Topa
  - location: Rotărești
  - coordinates: 46°48′12″N 22°13′22″E
  - elevation: 137 m (449 ft)
- Length: 21 km (13 mi)
- Basin size: 84 km^{2} (32 sq mi)

Basin features
- Progression: Topa→ Holod→ Crișul Negru→ Körös→ Tisza→ Danube→ Black Sea
- Tributaries
  - left: Scaduza, Bozani
  - right: Stracoș

The Cârpeștii Mici is a right tributary of the river Topa in Bihor County, Romania. It flows into the Topa near Sâmbăta. Its length is 21 km (13 mi) and its basin size is 84 km^{2} (32 sq mi).
