= Topa (disambiguation) =

Topa may refer to:

== Toponyms ==
- Topa, a town in Jharkhand, India
- Topa (river), a river in Bihor County, Romania
- Țopa, a village in the commune Albești, Mureș County, Romania
- Topa de Jos, a village in the commune Dobrești, Bihor County, Romania
- Topa de Sus, a village in the commune Dobrești, Bihor County, Romania

== Other uses ==
- Topa (surname), a family name
- T'o-pa, a rare romanization of Tuoba, a clan in ancient China
- TOPA, a shortened form of the term TOP Assay
