= Bozani (river) =

- Location within Romania

Location
- Country: Romania
- Counties: Bihor County
- Villages: Bucuroaia, Cotiglet, Ceișoara

Physical characteristics
- Source
  - coordinates: 46°56′46″N 22°11′17″E
  - elevation: 419 m (1,375 ft)
- Mouth: Cârpeștii Mici
  - location: Dușești
  - coordinates: 46°58′00″N 22°11′40″E
  - elevation: 146 m (479 ft)
- Length: 13 km (8.1 mi)
- Basin size: 24 km^{2} (9.3 sq mi)

Basin features
- Progression: Cârpeștii Mici→ Topa→ Holod→ Crișul Negru→ Körös→ Tisza→ Danube→ Black Sea
- Tributaries
  - right: Valea Lupului

The Bozani is a left tributary of the river Cârpeștii Mici in Romania. It flows into the Cârpeștii Mici in Dușești. Its length is 13 km (8.1 mi) and its basin size is 24 km^{2} (9.3 sq mi).
