= Vârciorog (disambiguation) =

Vârciorog may refer to the following places in Romania:

- Vârciorog, a commune in Bihor County
- Vârciorog (Topa), a tributary of the Topa in Bihor County
- Vârciorog Waterfall, a waterfall and protected area in Alba County
