= Runcșor (river) =

- Location within Romania

Location
- Country: Romania
- Counties: Bihor County

Physical characteristics
- Source
  - location: Pădurea Craiului Mountains
  - coordinates: 46°49′52″N 22°32′20″E
  - elevation: 725 m (2,379 ft)
- Mouth
  - location: Runcșor Sinkhole
  - coordinates: 46.8454°N 22.4932°E

Basin features
- Progression: sinkhole→ Toplicioara→ Șoimuș→ Valea Roșie→ Crișul Negru→ Körös→ Tisza→ Danube→ Black Sea

The Runcșor is a river in the Valea Roșie river basin, Romania. It originates in the Pădurea Craiului Mountains and flows westwards until it disappears into the Runcșor sinkhole. Most of its discharge resurfaces at the Toplicioara or Bulbuci karst spring, which feeds a right tributary of the Șoimuș River.
