= Drăgoteni =

- Location within Romania

Location
- Country: Romania
- Counties: Bihor County
- Villages: Drăgoteni, Poietari, Pocola

Physical characteristics
- Source: Goila
  - coordinates: 46°45′56″N 22°19′56″E
  - elevation: 250 m (820 ft)
- Mouth: Valea Roșie
  - location: Pocola
  - coordinates: 46°41′22″N 22°17′03″E
  - elevation: 166 m (545 ft)
- Length: 11 km (6.8 mi)
- Basin size: 41 km^{2} (16 sq mi)

Basin features
- Progression: Valea Roșie→ Crișul Negru→ Körös→ Tisza→ Danube→ Black Sea
- Tributaries
  - right: Săucani

The Drăgoteni is a right tributary of the river Valea Roșie in Romania. It flows into the Valea Roșie near Pocola. Its length is 11 km (6.8 mi) and its basin size is 41 km^{2} (16 sq mi).
