= Săliște (disambiguation) =

Săliște is a town in Sibiu County, Romania.

Săliște may refer to several other places in Romania:

- Săliște, a village in Spinuș Commune, Bihor County
- Săliște, a village in Ciurila Commune, Cluj County
- Săliște, a village in Bulzești Commune, Dolj County
- Săliște, a village in Băiţa Commune, Hunedoara County
- Săliște, a village in Băsești Commune, Maramureș County
- Săliște de Beiuș, a village in Budureasa Commune, Bihor County
- Săliște de Pomezeu, a village in Răbăgani Commune, Bihor County
- Săliște de Vașcău, a village in Criștioru de Jos Commune, Bihor County
- Săliște-Săldăbagiu, a former name for Săldăbagiu Mic village, Căpâlna Commune, Bihor County
- Săliște (Cibin), a tributary of the Cibin in Sibiu County
- Săliște, a small tributary of the Hășdate in Cluj County
- Săliște (Crișul Negru), a tributary of the Crișul Negru in Bihor County

== See also ==
- Săliștea (disambiguation)
