= Poiana (Topa) =

- Location within Romania

Location
- Country: Romania
- Counties: Bihor County

Physical characteristics
- Source
  - coordinates: 46°57′51″N 22°22′47″E
  - elevation: 498 m (1,634 ft)
- Mouth: Topa
  - coordinates: 46°57′58″N 22°18′44″E
  - elevation: 354 m (1,161 ft)
- Length: 8 km (5.0 mi)
- Basin size: 17 km^{2} (6.6 sq mi)

Basin features
- Progression: Topa→ Holod→ Crișul Negru→ Körös→ Tisza→ Danube→ Black Sea
- Tributaries
  - left: Sighileș

The Poiana is a left tributary of the river Topa in Romania. It flows into the Topa near Vârciorog. Its length is 8 km (5.0 mi) and its basin size is 17 km^{2} (6.6 sq mi).
