= PFAS =

Class of perfluorinated chemical compounds

Per- and polyfluoroalkyl substances (PFAS or PFASs) are a group of synthetic organofluorine chemical compounds that have multiple fluorine atoms attached to an alkyl chain. Because of their high chemical and thermal stability, these compounds have long environmental lifetimes, and thus are commonly called "forever chemicals".

The first PFAS, polychlorotrifluoroethylene, was synthesized in 1934. Their widespread use began in 1938 with the invention of Teflon (polytetrafluoroethylene), a fluoropolymer coating that resists heat, oil, stains, grease, and water. Since their inception, thousands of PFAS compounds have been created. They are used in a wide variety of products including waterproof fabric, yoga pants, carpets, shampoo, mobile phone screens, wall paint, furniture, adhesives, food packaging, firefighting foam, electrical insulation, and cosmetics.

PFAS are often found in rainwater, groundwater, wastewater and soil; wastewater treatment facilities and landfills have the highest levels of pollution. Furthermore, crop uptake of PFAS and bioaccumulation of PFAS into fish, livestock, and wildlife can act as potential routes of human exposure. In addition, areas near airports and air force bases are contaminated from the use of PFAS-containing firefighting foam.

Exposure to PFAS, some of which are carcinogens or endocrine disruptors, has been linked to diseases and health conditions including cancers, ulcerative colitis, thyroid disease, suboptimal antibody response or decreased immunity, decreased fertility, hypertensive disorders in pregnancy, fetal and child developmental issues, obesity, and high cholesterol. Due to the health and environmental concerns associated with many PFAS, PFOS and PFOA were listed in the Stockholm Convention on Persistent Organic Pollutants in 2009 and 2019, respectively. However, it is challenging to assess the potential risks of all PFAS due to the large data-gaps in toxicity and physicochemical properties. With thousands of compounds used in various application, only a few have undergone comprehensive biological testing.

In some jurisdictions, such as the European Union, further reductions and phase-outs of PFAS are planned. Several companies are voluntarily ending or planning to end the sale of PFAS and PFAS-containing products due to health and litigation concerns. However, major producers and users such as the United States, Israel, and Malaysia have not ratified the agreement and the chemical industry has lobbied governments to reduce regulations.

== Definition ==
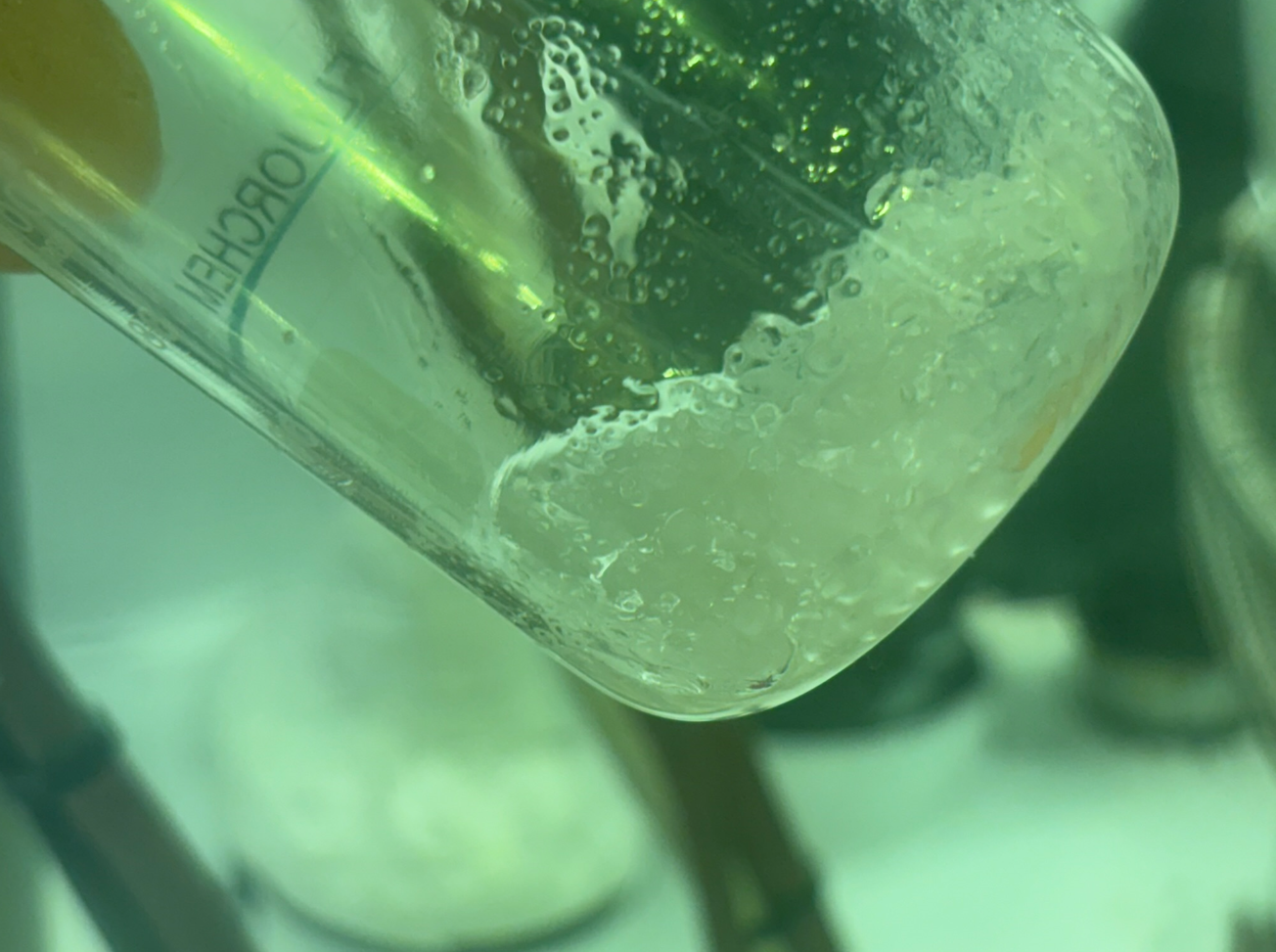
A sample of PFOA, appearing here as a white solid.

Per- and polyfluoroalkyl substances are a group of synthetic organofluorine chemical compounds that have multiple fluorine atoms attached to an alkyl chain. Different organizations use different definitions for PFAS, leading to estimates of between 8,000 and 7 million chemicals within the group. The EPA toxicity database, DSSTox, lists 14,735 unique PFAS chemical compounds. 7 million are listed in PubChem.

An early definition stated that PFAS were "aliphatic substances that contain 1 or more C atoms on which all the H substituents (present in the nonfluorinated analogues from which they are notionally derived) have been replaced by F atoms, in such a manner that they contain the perfluoroalkyl moiety, −C_{n}F_{2n+1}". Beginning in 2021, the OECD expanded its terminology, stating that "PFAS are defined as fluorinated substances that contain at least one fully fluorinated methyl or methylene carbon atom (without any H/Cl/Br/I atom attached to it), i.e., with a few noted exceptions, any chemical with at least a perfluorinated methyl group (−CF_{3}) or a perfluorinated methylene group (−CF_{2}−) is a PFAS."

The United States Environmental Protection Agency (EPA) defines PFAS more narrowly in the Drinking Water Contaminant Candidate List 5 as substances that contain "at least one of the following three structures: R−CF_{2}−CF(R')R", where both the −CF_{2}− and −CF− moieties are saturated carbons, and none of the R groups can be hydrogen; R−CF_{2}−O−CF_{2}−(R'), where both the −CF_{2}− moieties are saturated carbons, and none of the R groups can be hydrogen; or CF_{3}−C−(CF_{3})RR', where all the carbons are saturated, and none of the R groups can be hydrogen. A summary table of some PFAS definitions is provided in Hammel et al (2022).

=== Sample chemicals ===
Skeletal structure of Perfluorooctanesulfonic acid (PFOS), an effective, persistent and bioaccumulative fluorosurfactant

Common PFAS include:

- Perfluoroalkyl carboxylic acids (PFCAs), such as trifluoroacetic acid (TFA)
- Perfluorosulfonic acids (PFSAs), such as perfluorooctanesulfonic acid (PFOS)
- Precursors to PFCAs, such as fluorotelomers, including as fluorotelomer alcohols (FTOHs)
- Precursors to PFSAs, such as perfluorobutane sulfonamide (H-FBSA), perfluorooctanesulfonamide (PFOSA), perfluorobutanesulfonyl fluoride (PFOSB) or perfluorooctanesulfonyl fluoride (PFOSF)
- Fluoropolymers such as polytetrafluoroethylene (PTFE, aka Teflon)

== Uses ==
=== Products ===
PFAS are used to produce fluoropolymers by emulsion polymerization. Because they resist heat, oil, stains, grease, and water, they are ingredients in stain repellents, polishes, paints, and coatings. They came into use with the invention of Teflon in 1938. They have been used in products including waterproof fabric such as nylon, yoga pants, carpets, shampoo, feminine hygiene products, mobile phone screens, wall paint, furniture, adhesives, food packaging, firefighting foam, the insulation of electrical wires, dental floss and sunscreen. PFAS have been used by the cosmetic industry in cosmetics and personal care products, including lipstick, eye liner, mascara, foundation, concealer, lip balm, blush, and nail polish. Pesticides including fluazinam and flufenacet break down to produce trifluoroacetic acid. In 2025, a report by the US FDA stated that in 2021, up to 1.4% of cosmetics sold in Europe contained PFAS and as of 2025, less than 1% of cosmetics sold in the US contained PFAS.

=== Fluorosurfactants ===
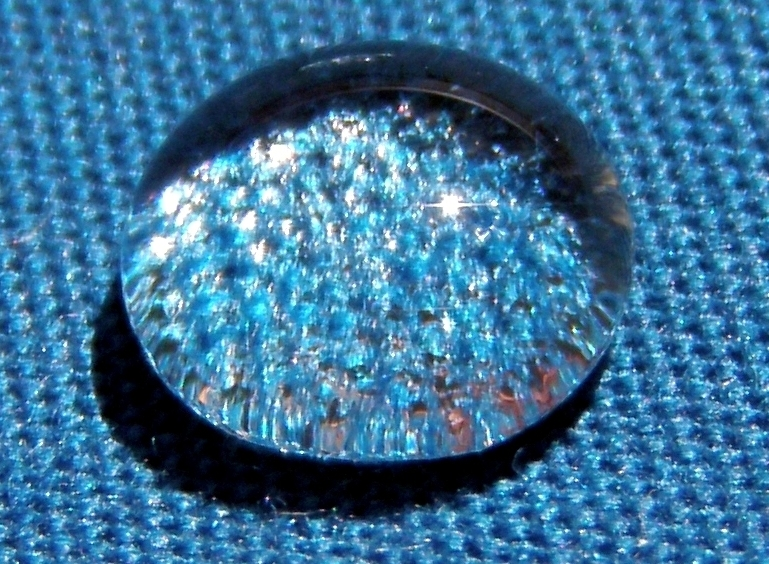
Fluorine-containing durable water repellent makes a fabric water-resistant.

Fluorinated surfactants or fluorosurfactants are a subgroup of PFAS characterized by a hydrophobic fluorinated "tail" and a hydrophilic "head" that behave as surfactants. These are more effective at reducing the surface tension of water than comparable hydrocarbon surfactants.

Fluorosurfactants tend to concentrate at the phase interfaces. Fluorocarbons are both lipophobic and hydrophobic, repelling both oil and water. Their lipophobicity results from the relative lack of London dispersion forces compared to hydrocarbons, a consequence of fluorine's large electronegativity and small bond length, which reduce the polarizability of the surfactants' fluorinated molecular surface. Fluorosurfactants are more stable than hydrocarbon surfactants due to the stability of the carbon–fluorine bond. Perfluorinated surfactants persist in the environment for the same reason.

Fluorosurfactants such as PFOS, PFOA, and perfluorononanoic acid (PFNA) have caught the attention of regulatory agencies because of their persistence, toxicity, and widespread occurrence in the blood of general populations.

=== Market ===
The market for PFAS was estimated to be US$28 billion in 2023. The majority are produced by 12 companies: 3M, AGC Inc., Archroma, Arkema, BASF, Bayer, Chemours, Daikin, Honeywell, Merck Group, Shandong Dongyue Chemical, and Solvay. Sales of PFAS, which cost approximately $20 per kilogram, generated a total industry profit of $4 billion per year on 16% profit margins in 2023.

== Environmental effects ==
=== Prevalence in rain, soil, water bodies, and air ===
In 2022, levels of at least four perfluoroalkyl acids (PFAAs) in rain water worldwide greatly exceeded the EPA's lifetime drinking water health advisories as well as comparable Danish, Dutch, and European Union safety standards, leading to the conclusion that "the global spread of these four PFAAs in the atmosphere has led to the planetary boundary for chemical pollution being exceeded". The most common PFAS found in the environment is Trifluoroacetic acid (TFA). Its presence is ubiquitous in the environment, especially in aquatic ecosystems, where it persists with increasing concentrations globally.

Wastewater discharges are an important source of PFAS to surface water bodies. Monitoring of wastewater treatment plant discharges to San Francisco Bay between 2009 and 2022 consistently detected PFHxA, PFPeA, PFOA, and PFOS in wastewater effluent at ng/L levels. While conventional wastewater treatment processes are not designed to remove PFAS or other emerging contaminants, they do provide some removal. In a 2026 meta-analysis, scientists found that PFAS removal varied by treatment plant's technology. Conventional activated sludge removed 42% of PFAS on average; biological nutrient removal removed 54%, and membrane bioreactors removed 70% of PFAS.

It had been thought that PFAAs would eventually end up in the oceans, where they would be diluted over decades, but a field study published in 2021 by researchers at Stockholm University found that they are often transferred from water to air when waves reach land, are a significant source of air pollution, and eventually get into rain. The researchers concluded that pollution may impact large areas. Soil is also contaminated and the chemicals have been found in remote areas such as Antarctica. Soil contamination can result in higher levels of PFAS found in foods such as white rice, coffee, and animals reared on contaminated ground. In 2024, a worldwide study of 45,000 groundwater samples found that 31% of samples contained levels of PFAS that were harmful to human health; these samples were taken from areas not near any obvious source of contamination.

Contamination has also been seen in water wells and other sources of drinking water. This contamination is seen in US, United Kingdom, Germany, Japan, and Canada, but information from most developing countries is nearly nonexistent. The lack of information on PFAS contamination in developing countries, especially those in Africa, are due to structural socioeconomic inequality and lack of access to the expensive laboratory capabilities required for PFAS quantification.

=== Bioaccumulation and biomagnification ===
In marine species of the food web

Bioaccumulation controls internal concentrations of pollutants, including PFAS, in individual organisms. When bioaccumulation is looked at in the perspective of the entire food web, it is called biomagnification, which is important to track because lower concentrations of pollutants in environmental matrices such as seawater or sediments, can very quickly grow to harmful concentrations in organisms at higher trophic levels, including humans. Notably, concentrations in biota can even be greater than 5000 times those present in water for PFOS and C_{10}–C_{14} PFCAs. PFAS can enter an organism by ingestion of sediment, through the water, or directly via their diet. It accumulates mainly in areas with high protein content, in the blood and liver, but it is also found to a lesser extent in tissues.

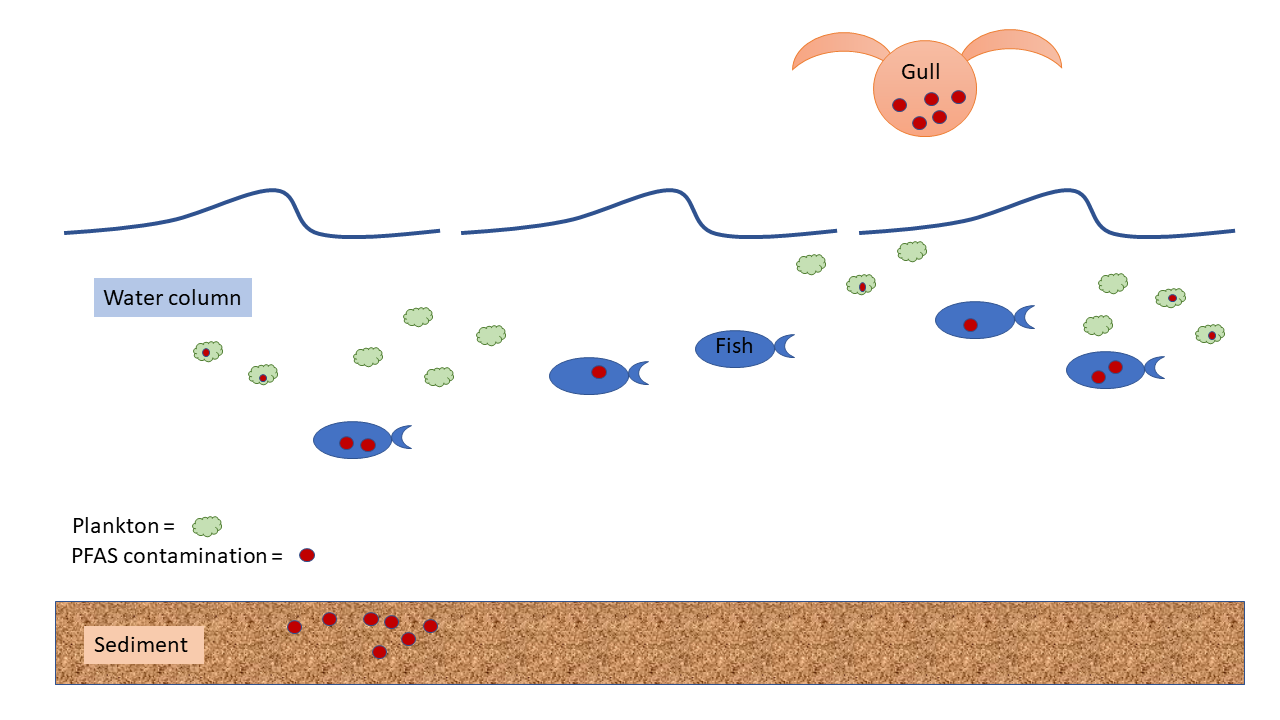
Bioaccumulation of PFAS: PFAS from sediments and water can accumulate in marine organisms. Animals higher up the food chain accumulate more because they absorb PFAS in the prey they eat.

In a study undertaken on a macrotidal estuary in Gironde, in south-west France, PFOA and PFNA were found to be highly bioaccumulative. PFOS, a long-chain sulfonic acid, was found at the highest concentrations relative to other PFAS measured in fish and birds in northern seas such as the Barents Sea and the Canadian Arctic. A global meta-analysis found that PFAS concentrations increase, on average, twofold with each trophic level, with substantial variation among compounds. Notably, the industrial replacement compound F-53B exhibited the highest trophic magnification, exceeding that of several legacy PFAS it was intended to replace.

A study published in 2023 analyzing 500 composite samples of fish fillets collected across the United States from 2013 to 2015 under the EPA's monitoring programs showed freshwater fish ubiquitously contain high levels of harmful PFAS, with a single serving typically significantly increasing the blood PFOS level.

Bioaccumulation and biomagnification of PFAS in marine species such as fish and shellfish can have important impacts on human populations. PFAS have been frequently documented in both fish and shellfish that are commonly consumed by human populations, which poses health risks to humans and studies on the bioaccumulation in certain species are important to determine daily tolerable limits for human consumption, and where those limits may be exceeded causing potential health risks. This has particular implications for populations that consume larger numbers of wild fish and shellfish species. PFAS contamination has also resulted in disruptions to the food supply, such as closures and limits on fishing.

PFAS are brought to the Arctic from polluted southern waters by migrating birds. Although it is much less than compared to the introduction by wind and the oceans, the birds become vectors, transmitting the toxic chemicals. Rainer Lohmann, an oceanographer at the University of Rhode Island, noted that this has a significant localized affect that is devastating for Arctic predators who accumulate toxins in their bodies because the contaminants from the birds often enter the food chain directly since the birds are the prey of many species.

Though fluorosurfactants with shorter carbon chains may be less prone to accumulating in mammals, there is still concern that they may be harmful to both humans and the environment.

== Health effects ==
Exposure to PFAS typically comes from consumption of PFAS contaminated food or water and inhalation of airborne PFAS. Once in the body, some PFAS have half-lives of over eight years. PFAS are not broken down in the body, but instead cleared from the body in urine. This lengthy residence time and widespread environmental contamination lead to accumulation of PFAS that may cause adverse health outcomes. Given the large diversity of PFAS compounds, there is a lack of high-quality epidemiological data on the associations between most specific PFAS chemicals and toxicological impacts.

Effects of exposure to PFAS on human health

Early occupational studies revealed elevated levels of fluorochemicals, including perfluorooctanesulfonic acid (PFOS) and perfluorooctanoic acid (PFOA), in the blood of exposed industrial workers, but cited no ill health effects. From 2005 to 2013, three epidemiologists known as the C8 Science Panel conducted health studies as part of a contingency to a class action lawsuit brought by communities in the Ohio River Valley against DuPont. Based on PFOA blood serum concentrations in 69,000 individuals from around DuPont's Washington Works Plant in Parkersburg, West Virginia, this panel reported probable links between elevated PFOA blood concentration and high cholesterol, ulcerative colitis, thyroid disease, testicular cancer, kidney cancer, delayed puberty onset, and pregnancy induced hypertension and preeclampsia. The findings on thyroid disease and ulcerative colitis have since been supported by further studies.

The severity of suspected PFAS-associated health effects can vary based on the length of exposure, level of exposure, and health status. Infants may be exposed to PFAS both gestationally and by transfer from mother to child via breastfeeding. Children and infants may be particularly susceptible to PFAS contamination, with potential symptoms of abnormally small birth weight syndrome, preterm birth, one or more neurodevelopmental disorders, and decreased response to childhood vaccines. A study with a population of 2,525 adults from the US National Health and Nutrition Examination Survey (NHANES) reported hearing losses consistent with dose-response trends. An association between hearing loss and high level exposures to PFNA was also reported in 2020.

PFOA is classified as carcinogenic to humans (Group 1) by the International Agency for Research on Cancer (IARC), with significant associations with the onset of liver, pancreatic, and uterine cancers. IARC also classified PFOS as possibly carcinogenic to humans (Group 2b) based on "strong" mechanistic evidence. Evidence suggests PFOA, perfluorohexanesulfonic acid (PFHxS), and perfluorononanoic acid (PFNA) cause hepatotoxicity in humans and links PFAS exposure to male infertility.

== Responses to knowledge of harmful effects ==
=== Ending manufacture ===
Citing health concerns, several manufacturing companies have ended or stated that they plan to end the sale of PFAS or products that contain them. These companies include W. L. Gore & Associates (the maker of Gore-Tex), Patagonia, REI, H&M, and 3M. An alternative for some companies may have been to move production to countries such as Thailand and India, where there is less regulation.

=== Suppressing information on health effects ===
Since the 1970s, DuPont and 3M were aware that PFAS was "highly toxic when inhaled and moderately toxic when ingested". Producers used several strategies to influence science and regulation – most notably, suppressing unfavorable research and distorting public discourse. In 2018, under the first presidency of Donald Trump, White House staff and the EPA pressured the U.S. Agency for Toxic Substances and Disease Registry to suppress a study that showed PFAS to be more dangerous than previously thought.

=== Litigation and regulations ===
External costs, including those associated with remediation of soil and water contamination, treatment of related diseases, and monitoring of pollution, may be as high as US$17.5 trillion annually, according to ChemSec. PFAS have been a subject of multiple lawsuits worldwide. In the United States, settlements stemming from PFAS pollution claims have reached $18 billion by 2024. In 2023, Sweden's Supreme Court set a legal precedent by awarding damages to citizens who were supplied PFAS contaminated drinking water.

Countries such as Canada have published drinking water guidelines for PFOS and PFOA The European Union is developing an action plan to eliminate non-essential uses of PFAS. The United Nations has listed PFOS, PFOA, PFHxS, long-chain PFCAs and related chemicals as persistent organic pollutants under the Stockholm Convention on Persistent Organic Pollutants between 2009 and 2025.

The United States Environmental Protection Agency (EPA) published non-enforceable drinking water health advisories for PFOA and PFOS. In 2021, Maine became the first U.S. state to ban these compounds in all products by 2030. As of October 2020, the states of California, Connecticut, Massachusetts, Michigan, Minnesota, New Hampshire, New Jersey, New York, Vermont, and Wisconsin had enforceable drinking water standards for between two and six types of PFAS. EPA published drinking water standards for PFOA, PFOS, perfluorohexanesulfonic acid (PFHxS), perfluorononanoic acid (PFNA), hexafluoropropylene oxide dimer acid (also known as GenX) and perfluorobutanesulfonic acid (PFBS) in April 2024.

However, some major producers and users such as the United States, Israel, and Malaysia have not ratified the agreement on reducing use of PFAS, and the chemical industry has lobbied governments to reduce regulations. For example in the United States, bills on cosmetics, food packaging, and textiles meant to regulate PFAS failed to pass through Congress in 2022.

In 2026, the UK increased testing for PFAS as part of a national plan to tackle the substances, which have prompted environmental and health concerns. The government says that by 2029 it wants to align more closely with regulations issued by the EU, which is looking to prohibit all non-essential uses.

== Occupational exposure ==
Occupational exposure to PFAS occurs in numerous industries due to the widespread use of the chemicals in products and as an element of industrial process streams. People who are exposed to PFAS through their jobs typically have higher blood concentrations of PFAS than the general population due to their elevated risk for accidental ingestion, inhalation exposure, and skin contact of PFAS. Occupational exposure can occur both during production of PFAS at fluorochemical facilities and in other industries that utilize these chemicals in their processes and products.

=== Fluorochemical manufacturing workers ===
People who work at fluorochemical production plants and in manufacturing industries that use PFAS in the industrial process can be exposed to PFAS in the workplace. Much of what we know about PFAS exposure and health effects began with medical surveillance studies of workers exposed to PFAS at fluorochemical production facilities. These studies began in the 1940s and were conducted primarily at U.S. and European manufacturing sites. Between the 1940s and 2000s, thousands of workers exposed to PFAS participated in research studies that advanced scientific understanding of exposure pathways, toxicokinetic properties, and adverse health effects associated with exposure.

The first research study to report elevated organic fluorine levels in the blood of fluorochemical workers was published in 1980. It established inhalation as a potential route of occupational PFAS exposure by reporting measurable levels of organic fluorine in air samples at the facility. Workers at fluorochemical production facilities have higher levels of PFOA and PFOS in their blood than the general population. Serum PFOA levels in fluorochemical workers are generally below 20,000 ng/mL but have been reported as high as 100,000 ng/mL, whereas the mean PFOA concentration among non-occupationally exposed cohorts in the same time frame was 4.9 ng/mL. Among fluorochemical workers, those with direct contact with PFAS have higher PFAS concentrations in their blood than those with intermittent contact or no direct PFAS contact. Blood PFAS levels have been shown to decline when direct contact ceases. PFOA and PFOS levels have declined in U.S. and European fluorochemical workers due to improved facilities, increased usage of personal protective equipment, and the discontinuation of these chemicals from production. Occupational exposure to PFAS in manufacturing continues to be an active area of study in China with numerous investigations linking worker exposure to various PFAS.

=== Firefighters ===
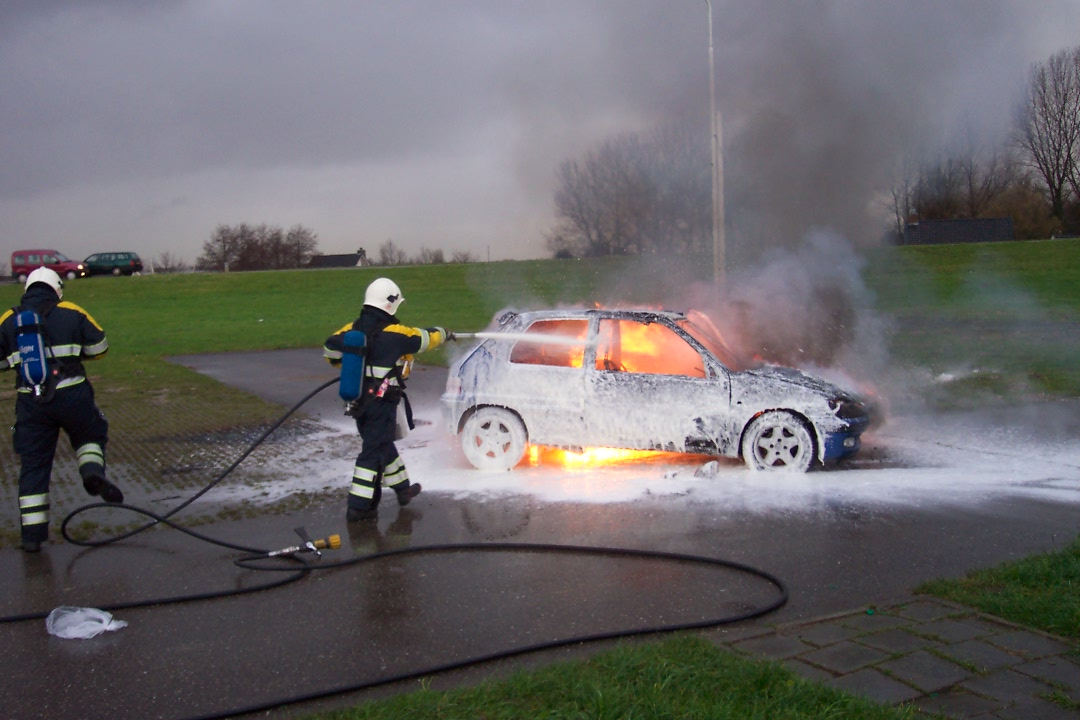
Firefighters using aqueous film forming foam (AFFF)

PFAS are used in Class B firefighting foams due to their hydrophobic and lipophobic properties, as well as the stability of the chemicals when exposed to high heat. Though studies have been frequently limited by underpowered study designs, research indicates firefighters have higher blood levels of PFOS and PFHxS than the general population. PFAS exposure is prevalent among firefighters not only due to its use in emergencies but also because it is used in personal protective equipment. In support of these findings, states like Washington and Colorado have moved to restrict and penalize the use of Class B firefighting foam for firefighter training and testing.

The September 11 attacks and resulting fires caused the release of toxic chemicals used in materials such as stain-resistant coatings. First responders to this incident were exposed to PFOA, PFNA, and PFHxS through inhalation of dust and smoke released during and after the collapse of the World Trade Center. First responders who were working at or near ground zero were assessed for respiratory and other health effects from exposure to emissions at the World Trade Center. Early clinical testing showed a high prevalence of respiratory health effects. Early symptoms of exposure often presented with persistent coughing and wheezing. PFOA and PFHxS levels were present in both smoke and dust exposure, but first responders exposed to smoke had higher concentrations of PFOA and PFHxS than those exposed to dust.

=== Ski wax technicians ===
Glide wax used to coat the bottom of skis to reduce the friction between the skis and snow may contain PFAS such as PFOA, PFNA, PFDA, PFHpA, and PFDoDA, leading to exposure by technicians. During the coating process, the wax is heated, releasing fumes and airborne particles which can produce higher PFAS air concentrations than other reported occupational and residential exposures.

=== Mitigation measures ===
Several strategies have been proposed to protect people at greatest risk of occupational exposure to PFAS, including exposure monitoring, regular blood testing, and the use of PFAS-free alternatives such as fluorine-free firefighting foam and plant-based ski wax.

== Remediation ==
=== Water treatment ===
Several destructive and non-destructive technologies can be applied to drinking water supplies, groundwater, industrial wastewater, surface water, and other applications such as landfill leachate, including:

Non-destructive methods

- Sorption (including granular activated carbon, biochar, and ion exchange resins)
- Membrane filtration (reverse osmosis, nanofiltration)
- Foam fractionation
- Precipitation/flocculation/coagulation
- Constructed wetlands

Destructive methods

- Supercritical water oxidation
- Photodegradation
- Sonochemical oxidation
- Electrochemical oxidation
- Plasma treatment
- Hydrothermal alkaline treatment
- Incineration

Private and public sector applications of one or more of these methodologies above are being applied to remediation sites throughout the United States and other international locations.

The U.S.-based Interstate Technology and Regulatory Council (ITRC) has undertaken an extensive evaluation of ex-situ and in-situ treatment technologies for PFAS-impacted liquid matrices. These technologies are divided into field-implemented technologies, limited application technologies, and developing technologies and typically fit into one of three technology types, namely separation, concentration, and destruction.

==== Foam fractionation ====
The surfactant nature of many results in their concentration at the air-water interface. In foam fractionation, air is bubbled through PFAS-contaminated water to create interfacial surfaces that collect PFAS and carry them to the surface. This process generates a foam that can be harvested or destroyed directly. The absence of a solid absorptive surface reduces consumables and waste byproducts and produces a liquid hyper-concentrate which can be fed into one of the various PFAS destruction technologies. Across various full-scale trials and field applications, this technique provides a simplistic and low operational cost alternative for complex PFAS-impacted waters. The foam fractionation technique is a derivation of traditional absorptive bubble separation techniques used by industries for decades to extract amphiphilic contaminants.

== Analytical methods ==
Given the large diversity of PFAS structures that exist, analytical methods for PFAS analysis generally take one of two different approaches: targeted analysis or non-targeted analysis. Targeted methods narrow focus on known PFAS of concern (e.g. PFOA, PFOS) and generally use solid-phase extraction with liquid chromatography–mass spectrometry (LC-MS) detection. For example, EPA Method 537.1 is approved for use in drinking water and can quantify 18 PFAS compounds, while EPA Method 1633A is approved for use for wastewater, surface water, groundwater, soil, biosolids, sediment, landfill leachate, and fish tissue for 40 PFAS chemicals. Regulatory limits for PFOA and PFOS set by the US EPA (4 parts-per-trillion) are limited by the capability of targeted methods to detect low-level concentrations.

Non-targeted analyses often sacrifice the identification and quantification of specific PFAS compounds to better understand the amount of PFAS present as a class. For example, total organic fluorine (TOF) analysis quantifies the amount of fluoride produced when a sample is oxidized at high enough temperatures to break the carbon-fluorine bond using combustion ion chromatography. Variants of this analysis include adsorbable organic fluorine (AOF) and extractable organic fluorine (EOF), which use similar solid-phase extraction approaches as the targeted analysis, but use combustion ion chromatography (CIC) as a detector. Other tests, such as the total oxidizable precursor assay, use chemical techniques to transform polyfluorinated compounds into perfluorinated compounds, dramatically reducing the diversity of PFAS in the sample.

== In popular culture ==
=== Films ===
- The Devil We Know (2018): a documentary detailing the health dangers of PFAS.
- Dark Waters (2019): a thriller movie based on the corporate defense of PFAS and DuPont.
- Contaminated: The Carpet Industry's Toxic Legacy (2026): documentary about the history of PFAS and the carpet industry.
- Everywhere & Forever: Blood. Water. And the Politics of PFAS (2025): a documentary about PFAS and the struggles to manage the contamination.
- Revealed: How to Poison A Planet (2024): a documentary detailing the negative externalities from PFAS creation.

== See also ==
- Entegris, formerly Fluoroware, of Chaska, MN, manufacturer of teflon components for health and semiconductor Fabs
- Euthenics, as the general category for policy interventions aiming to mitigate associated effects on human populations
- Fluoropolymer, subclass of per- and polyfluoroalkyl substances
- FSI International, now TEL FSI
- Persistent, bioaccumulative and toxic substances
- Polytetrafluoroethylene (PTFE)
- Timeline of events related to per- and polyfluoroalkyl substances
