= Copăceni =

Copăceni may refer to the following places:

== Romania ==
- Copăceni, Ilfov, a commune in Ilfov County
- Copăceni, Vâlcea, a commune in Vâlcea County
- Copăceni, a village in Sâmbăta Commune, Bihor County
- Copăceni, a village in Săndulești Commune, Cluj County
- Copăceni, a village in Malu cu Flori Commune, Dâmboviţa County
- Copăceni, a village in Racovița, Vâlcea Commune, Vâlcea County

== Moldova ==
- Copăceni, Sîngerei, a commune in Sîngerei District

== See also ==
- Copăcioasa (disambiguation)
- Copăcel, name of two villages in Romania
- Copăcele, a village in Caraș-Severin County
- Copăcești, a village in Vrancea County
- Copăceana, a village in Vaslui County
- Copăceanca, a village in Teleorman County
