= Surduc (disambiguation) =

Surduc may refer to the following places in Romania:

- Surduc, a commune located in Sălaj County
- Surduc, a village in Copăcel Commune, Bihor County
- Surduc, a village in Iara Commune, Cluj County
- Surduc Pass, a mountain pass in the Gorj and Hunedoara counties of Southwestern Romania
- Surduc (Bega), a river in Timiș County
- Surduc, a tributary of the Crișul Repede in Cluj County
- Surducel, a village in Vârciorog Commune, Bihor County

== See also ==
- Surdu (disambiguation)
- Surducu (disambiguation)
- Surdila (disambiguation)
- Surdești (disambiguation)
