= Meziad =

Meziad or Mezyad may refer to:

- Mezyad, Al-Ain, a settlement on the UAE-Omani border in Eastern Arabia
- Meziad, a village in the commune Remetea, Bihor County, Romania
- Meziad (river), a river in Bihor County, Romania

== See also ==
- Mazyad
