= Hidișel =

Hidișel may refer to the following places in Romania:

- Hidișel, a village in the commune Dobrești, Bihor County
- Hidișel (Holod), a tributary of the Holod in Bihor County
- Hidișel (Peța), a tributary of the Peța in Bihor County
