= Valea Măgurii River =

Valea Măgurii River may refer to:

- Valea Măgurii, a tributary of the Dâmbovița in Argeș County, Romania
- Valea Măgurii, a tributary of the Valea lui Vasile in Bihor County, Romania
