= Harja =

Harja may be

- a Germanic word for "warrior", found especially as an element in given names, see Heri
- Hârja, a river in Bihor County, Romania
- Hârja, a village in the commune Oituz, Bacău County, Romania
