= Topești =

Topeşti may refer to several villages in Romania:

- Topeşti, a village in Drăgești Commune, Bihor County
- Topeşti, a village in the town of Tismana, Gorj County
- Topeşti, a village in Bârsești Commune, Vrancea County
