= Dușești =

Dușești may refer to several villages in Romania:

- Duşeşti, a village in Ceica Commune, Bihor County
- Dușești, a village in Ștefan cel Mare Commune, Neamț County
