= Vârciorog (Topa) =

- Location within Romania

Location
- Country: Romania
- Counties: Bihor County
- Villages: Surducel

Physical characteristics
- Source: Pădurea Craiului Mountains
  - location: Bulzu Hill
  - coordinates: 46°55′41″N 22°21′48″E
  - elevation: 507 m (1,663 ft)
- Mouth: Topa
  - coordinates: 46°57′09″N 22°17′10″E
  - elevation: 309 m (1,014 ft)
- Length: 9 km (5.6 mi)
- Basin size: 20 km^{2} (7.7 sq mi)

Basin features
- Progression: Topa→ Holod→ Crișul Negru→ Körös→ Tisza→ Danube→ Black Sea
- Tributaries
  - left: Berendești, Valea Urzicarilor, Valea Semnelor

The Vârciorog is a left tributary of the river Topa in Romania. It flows into the Topa near the village Vârciorog. Its length is 9 km (5.6 mi) and its basin size is 20 km^{2} (7.7 sq mi).
