= Hidișel (Holod) =

- Location within Romania

Location
- Country: Romania
- Counties: Bihor County
- Villages: Dicănești, Gruilung, Bicăcel, Lupoaia

Physical characteristics
- Source
  - coordinates: 46°55′07″N 22°06′14″E
  - elevation: 297 m (974 ft)
- Mouth: Holod
  - location: Holod
  - coordinates: 46°46′49″N 22°08′15″E
  - elevation: 129 m (423 ft)
- Length: 17 km (11 mi)
- Basin size: 52 km^{2} (20 sq mi)

Basin features
- Progression: Holod→ Crișul Negru→ Körös→ Tisza→ Danube→ Black Sea
- Tributaries
  - left: Ostaș

The Hidișel is a right tributary of the river Holod in Romania. It flows in southern direction and discharges into the Holod in the village Holod. Its length is 17 km (11 mi) and its basin size is 52 km^{2} (20 sq mi). Another river named Hidișel originates close to the source of this river, but flows northwest towards the Crișul Repede.
