= Pocola =

Pocola may refer to the following places:

- Pocola, Bihor, Romania
- Pocola, Oklahoma, United States
