= Roșia, Bihor =

Roșia
- Commune
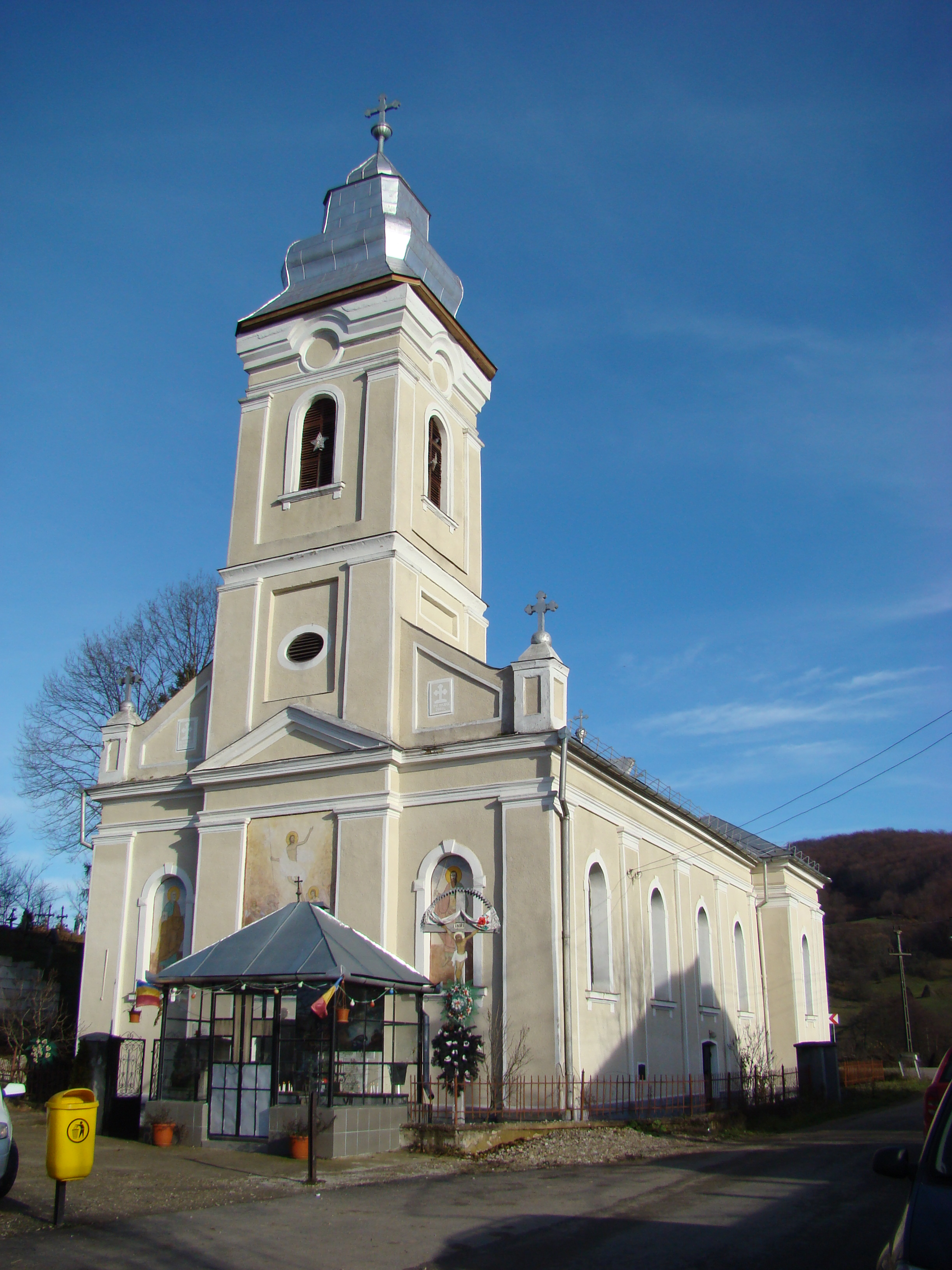
- Romanian Orthodox church in Roșia

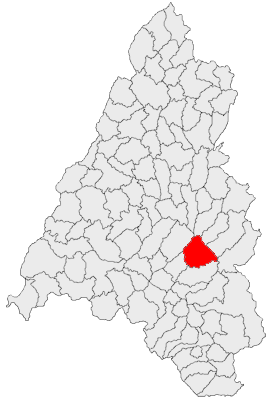
- Location in Bihor County

- Location in Romania
- Coordinates: 46°48′N 22°24′E
- Country: Romania
- County: Bihor

Government
  - Mayor (2020–2024): Remus-Florin Moțiu (PNL)
- Area: 72.52 km^{2} (28.00 sq mi)
- Population (2021-12-01): 2,285
  - Density: 31.51/km^{2} (81.61/sq mi)
- Time zone: UTC+02:00 (EET)
  - Summer (DST): UTC+03:00 (EEST)
- Postal code: 417425
- Area code: +40 x59
- Vehicle reg.: BH
- Website: comunarosiabihor.ro

Roșia (Hungarian: Biharrósa) is a large commune in Romania, Crișana, Bihor County, around 21 kilometres (13 miles) north from the town of Beiuș. It is composed of two villages, Lazuri (Lázurihegy) and Roșia.

== Geography ==
Roșia covers a surface area of 72.52 km^{2} (28 sq mi). It is located in the eastern part of the county, at the edge of the Apuseni Mountains, in the foothills of the Pădurea Craiului Mountains. It lies on the banks of the Valea Roșie River, a tributary of the Crișul Negru; the Șoimuș River flows into the Valea Roșie near Roșia.

The commune is crossed by county road DJ764, which joins Beiuș to the town of Aleșd; the county seat, Oradea, is some 70 km (43 mi) to the northwest.

Roșia has beautiful landscapes, mountain rivers, caves, and large forests. In the Ciurul Mare Cave, speleologists have discovered some distinctively male, female, and child footprints; an anthropological analysis has identified Cro-Magnon and even Neanderthal characteristics in these footprints.

== Population ==
According to the 2011 census, the commune has 2,384 inhabitants, 98.87% of whom are ethnic Romanians; 85.3% are Romanian Orthodox and 13.6% Pentecostal.

== Natives ==
- Gheorghe Ciuhandu (1875–1947), priest of the Romanian Orthodox Church, theologian, and historian
