= Hârja =

- Location within Romania

Location
- Country: Romania
- Counties: Bihor County
- Villages: Săldăbagiu Mic

Physical characteristics
- Source
  - coordinates: 46°45′09″N 22°10′15″E
  - elevation: 186 m (610 ft)
- Mouth: Holod
  - location: Downstream of Vintere
  - coordinates: 46°46′04″N 22°07′09″E
  - elevation: 126 m (413 ft)
- Length: 8 km (5.0 mi)
- Basin size: 21 km^{2} (8.1 sq mi)

Basin features
- Progression: Holod→ Crișul Negru→ Körös→ Tisza→ Danube→ Black Sea
- Tributaries
  - right: Valea Rovinei

The Hârja is a left tributary of the river Holod in Romania. It flows into the Holod near Vintere. Its length is 8 km (5.0 mi) and its basin size is 21 km^{2} (8.1 sq mi).
