= Valea lui Vasile =

- Location within Romania

Location
- Country: Romania
- Counties: Bihor County
- Villages: Dobrești, Hidișel

Physical characteristics
- Source: Pădurea Craiului Mountains
  - coordinates: 46°55′01″N 22°16′50″E
  - elevation: 536 m (1,759 ft)
- Mouth: Topa
  - location: Hidișel
  - coordinates: 46°50′05″N 22°14′46″E
  - elevation: 144 m (472 ft)
- Length: 11 km (6.8 mi)
- Basin size: 21 km^{2} (8.1 sq mi)

Basin features
- Progression: Topa→ Holod→ Crișul Negru→ Körös→ Tisza→ Danube→ Black Sea
- Tributaries
  - left: Valea Măgurii

The Valea lui Vasile is a left tributary of the river Topa in Romania. It flows into the Topa near the village Hidișel. Its length is 11 km (6.8 mi) and its basin size is 21 km^{2} (8.1 sq mi).
