= Gheorghe Ciuhandu (priest) =

Romanian historian (1875-1947)

- Born: April 23, 1875
- Died: April 29, 1947 (aged 72)
- Occupation(s): Priest, theologian, historian and activist

Gheorghe Ciuhandu (April 23, 1875 – April 29, 1947) was an Austro-Hungarian-born Romanian priest of the Romanian Orthodox Church, theologian, historian and advocate for ethnic Romanians' rights in Transylvania.

== Biography ==
Born into a priestly family in Biharrósa, Bihar County (now Roșia, Bihor County), he enrolled in the Theological Institute of Arad, where in 1893 he took part in protests against the Hungarian government's dismissal from the faculty of Bishop Vasile Mangra. Graduating in 1898, he enrolled in the doctoral program at Czernowitz University upon the recommendation of Bishop Iosif Goldiș. In 1905, he obtained his doctorate with distinction and returned to Arad, intending to begin a university career. In 1906, when fourteen members of the Romanian National Party were elected to the Hungarian Parliament, his expressed support for their policies led him to clash with the Institute's director. The same year, he was named school inspector for the Arad Diocese, later taking charge of cultural affairs. He was ordained deacon in 1908 and priest in 1910, being accorded the rank of archpriest the same year.

He took part in the December 1918 assembly that marked the union of Transylvania with Romania, where a solemn prayer he had written for the occasion was read aloud. The following March, in Sibiu, he took part in the founding congress of the Transylvanian Orthodox Clergy Association, where he was the first to officially propose raising the church to the level of a Patriarchate. In 1922, he was elected the association's president. In 1939, under the National Renaissance Front regime, he was elected to the Romanian Senate. In 1946, he became an honorary member of the Romanian Academy. He died the following year in Vața de Jos, Hunedoara County.

His grandson Gheorghe Ciuhandu served as Mayor of Timișoara from 1996 to 2012.

== Selected bibliography ==
- Școala noastră poporală și darea culturală (1918)
- Împreunarea Bisericilor Ortodoxe Române din România Mare și raportul Bisericii cu Statul (1919)
- Dezbinarea religioasă a românilor ardeleni. Falsificarea credinței și a istoriei (1927)
- Patronatul ecleziastic ungar în raport cu drepturile statului român. Studiu istoric-statistic și politic-bisericesc (1928)
- Câteva momente din trecutul episcopiei Aradului (1767-1830) (1929)
- Cărțile de afurisanie sau de blestem din Ardeal (1930)
- Bogomilismul și românii (1933)
- Românii din Câmpia Aradului de acum două veacuri. Cu un excurs istoric până la 1752 și însemnări istorice-politice ulterioare (1940)
- Memorii (1907-1925). Din viața mea. Făcute și pățite, spuse ca să învețe și alții (1999; begun 1927)
