= Valea Roșie (Crișul Negru) =

Valea Roșie Roșia
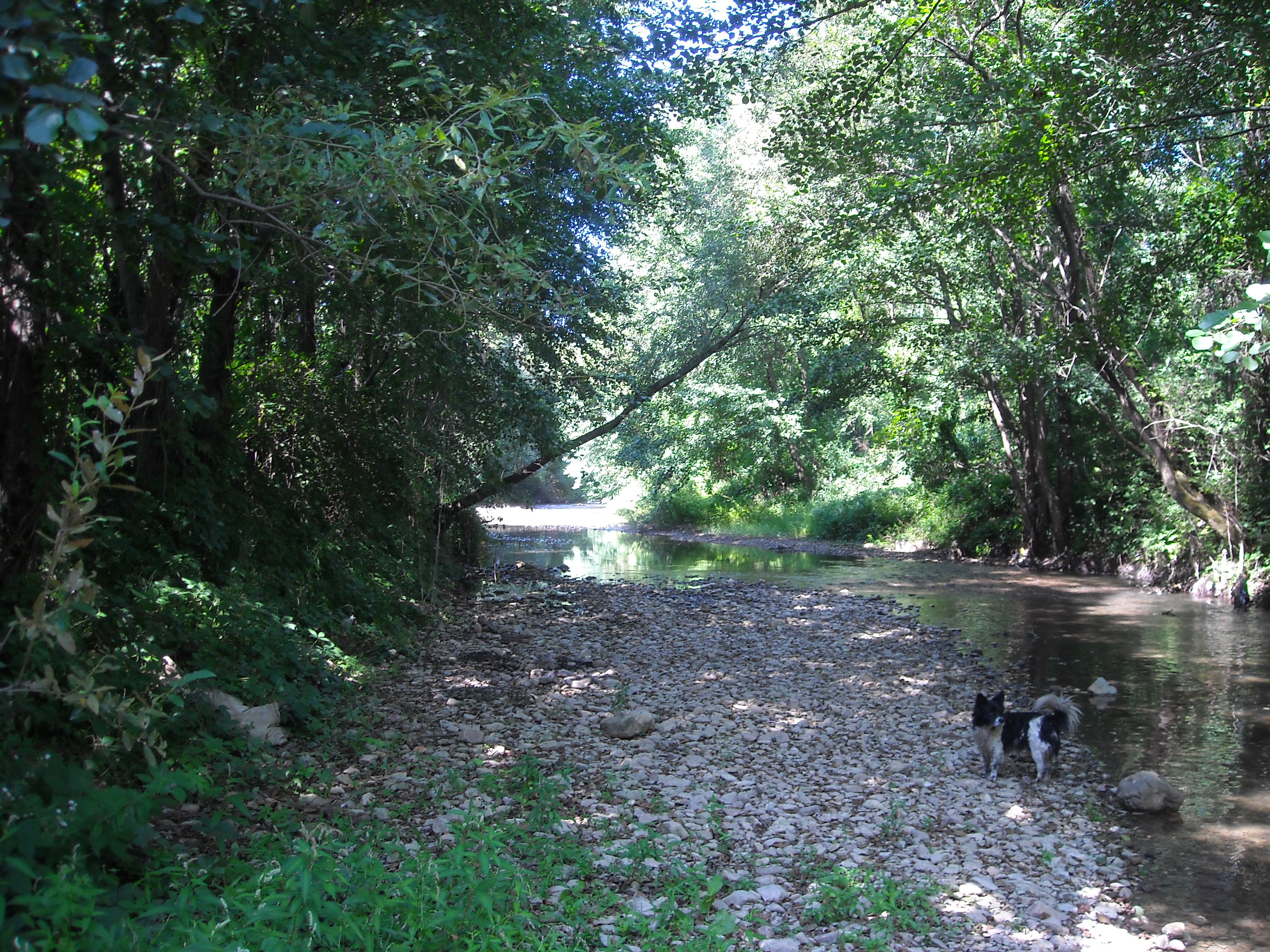

- Location within Romania

Location
- Country: Romania
- Counties: Bihor County
- Villages: Roșia, Remetea, Pocola

Physical characteristics
- Source: Roșia Karst Spring
  - location: Pădurea Craiului Mountains
  - coordinates: 46.849°N 22.424°E
  - elevation: 434 m (1,424 ft)
- Mouth: Crișul Negru
  - location: Petrani
  - coordinates: 46°40′59″N 22°16′18″E
  - elevation: 162 m (531 ft)
- Length: 38 km (24 mi)
- Basin size: 308 km^{2} (119 sq mi)

Basin features
- Progression: Crișul Negru→ Körös→ Tisza→ Danube→ Black Sea

The Valea Roșie or Roșia (Hungarian: Rossia-patak or Remete-patak) is a river in Romania, Bihor County, right tributary of the Crișul Negru. Its length is 38 km (24 mi) and its basin size is 308 km^{2} (119 sq mi).

The river starts at the Roșia karst spring in the Pădurea Craiului Mountains. It flows through the hills of the Beiuș Depression and joins the Crișul Negru near Pocola. The most important villages on the river are Roșia, Remetea and Pocola.

== Hydronymy ==
Valea Roșie had two Hungarian names. Originally it was called Remete-patak (referring to Remetea/Magyarremete village on its shore). That name was used until the 18th century, last time consequently in the 1720 conscription. During this century the remaining small community of Hungarians in the valley adopted the more frequently used Romanian name in the form of Rossia-patak. This name has been used since then. The older name means hermit in Hungarian.

== Tributaries ==
The following rivers are tributaries to the Valea Roșie:

- Left: Șoimuș, Sohodol, Meziad
- Right: Albioara, Strâmtura (Valea Ușorilor), Drăgoteni
