= Savar River =

Savar River may refer to:

- Sävar River, a river in Sweden
- Pârâul Domnului or Savar River, a river in Romania
