= Kisszurdok =

Kisszurdok is the Hungarian name for two villages in Romania:

- Surducel village, Vârciorog Commune, Bihor County
- Surducu Mic village, Traian Vuia Commune, Timiș County
