= Bozani =

Bozani may refer to several places:

- Bozani (river), in Bihor County, Romania
- the Kurdish name for Ayn Issa, Syria,
