= Surdești =

Surdeşti or Şurdeşti may refer to several villages in Romania:

- Surdeşti, a village in Sohodol Commune, Alba County
- Șurdești, Maramureș, a village in Şişeşti Commune, Maramureș County
- Surdeşti, a village in Breaza town, Prahova County

== See also ==
- Surdu (disambiguation)
- Surduc (disambiguation)
- Surducu (disambiguation)
- Surdila (disambiguation)
