= Surdila =

Surdila may refer to one of two communes in Brăila County, Romania:

- Surdila-Găiseanca
- Surdila-Greci

== See also ==
- Surdu (disambiguation)
- Surduc (disambiguation)
- Surducu (disambiguation)
- Surdești (disambiguation)
