= Vasile Mangra =

Austro-Hungarian cleric

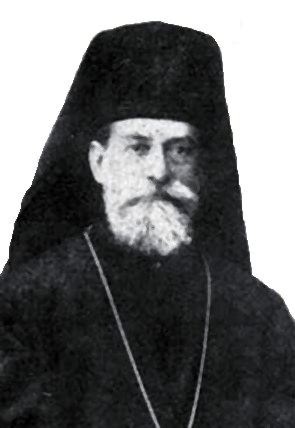
- Metropolitan Vasile Mangra
- Born: May 25, 1850; Săliște-Săldăbagiu, Bihar County, Kingdom of Hungary
- Died: October 14, 1918 (aged 68); Budapest, Hungary
- Occupations: historian, metropolitan bishop
- Political party: National Party of Work
- Other political affiliations: Romanian National Party

Vasile Mangra (Romanian pronunciation: [vaˈsile ˈmaŋɡra]; born Vichentie Mangra; May 25, 1850–October 14 [O.S. October 1] 1918) was an Austro-Hungarian cleric of the Romanian Orthodox Church and historian.

== Biography ==
=== Origins and early activity ===
Born in Săliște-Săldăbagiu, Bihor County, his father was a priest. He attended gymnasium in Beiuș and Oradea, studied theology in Arad from 1869 to 1872 and began but did not complete legal studies at the Oradea Law Academy. In 1875, he began teaching church history and canon law at the Arad Theological Institute, of which he was temporary director in 1882-1883. In 1893, he was dismissed from the faculty at the request of the Hungarian government. He edited the church newsletters Lumina (1874-1875) and Biserica și Scoala (1877-1879, 1882-1883 and 1899-1900). In 1879, he was tonsured a monk at the Hodoș-Bodrog Monastery, taking the name Vasile. In 1899, he was ordained a priest. In 1900, he was elected vice president of Oradea's Romanian Orthodox consistory, serving until 1916. He was made archimandrite in 1906. In 1901, he was elected bishop of the Arad Diocese, but due to his political activity, was prevented from assuming office by the Hungarian government.

Mangra was prominent within the Romanian national movement in Austria-Hungary. In 1892, he formed part of the delegation that took the Transylvanian Memorandum to Vienna. In 1894, he organized a large popular assembly in Sibiu that protested against the government's decision to ban the Romanian National Party. In 1895, he was the main organizer of a nationalities congress at Budapest that brought together Romanians, Serbs and Slovaks. However, late in life, he reversed course, becoming a trusted figure for the authorities. In 1910, he was elected to the Diet of Hungary's House of Representatives on a pro-government platform for a seat centered at Ceica.

=== As Metropolitan of Transylvania ===
In August 1916, in the middle of World War I and days before the Romanian Old Kingdom entered the conflict against Austria-Hungary, Mangra was elected Metropolitan of Transylvania. Prior to the vote, the administrative arm of the Budapest government, which was aware of the need for a friendly figure at the head of the church, intervened openly and forcefully in selecting the deputies (clergy and especially laity) for the upcoming church congress. With a compliant electorate in place, Prime Minister István Tisza was able to impose his choice. Shortly after the election, Romanian troops entered Transylvania, forcing a number of institutions to withdraw into the interior of the monarchy. These included the Sibiu-based archdiocesan council and theological institute, which functioned at Oradea from September 1916 until the following June, when Mangra was able to take up residence at Sibiu.

Thus, his enthronement took place in Oradea in October 1916; the rite was performed by suffragan bishops Ioan Papp of Arad and Miron Cristea of Caransebeș. In the summer of 1917, Education Minister Albert Apponyi ordered that a ministerial employee with full rights over the activities of teachers and students be assigned to each Romanian pedagogical school. The protest of Mangra and his suffragans went unheeded. The metropolitan died of heart disease in a Budapest hotel shortly before the union of Transylvania with Romania. Some claim he committed suicide, while others deny this scenario. His remains were buried in the Hungarian capital and are still there. After the union, his collaborationist stance was roundly condemned, with Papp and Cristea going so far as to declare his election invalid. It was only under Metropolitan Antonie Plămădeală, who took office in 1982, that his name was once again commemorated in the Sibiu Archdiocese's parishes during the Great Entrance.

Mangra authored several thorough works dealing with the history of church life among Transylvania's Romanians, and conducted important research into the old Romanian manuscripts of the Bihor area. Consequently, he was elected a titular member of the Romanian Academy in 1909.
