= Săliștea (disambiguation) =

Săliștea is a commune in Alba County, Romania.

Săliştea may also refer to:

- Săliştea, a village in Uda Commune, Argeș County, Romania
- Săliştea Nouă, a village in Baciu Commune, Cluj County, Romania
- Săliştea Veche, a village in Chinteni Commune, Cluj County, Romania
- Siliștea, Constanța, a village in Constanta County, Romania
- Săliștea de Sus, a town in Maramureș County, Romania
- Săliştea, a village in Malaia Commune, Vâlcea County, Romania
- Săliştea, a village in Râmnicu Vâlcea city, Vâlcea County, Romania

== See also ==
- Sălişte (disambiguation)
