= Dobrești mine =

Bauxite mine in Romania

- Location within Romania

Location
- Location: Dobreşti, Bihor County, Romania; 46°50′51″N 22°16′44″E

Production
- Products: Bauxite
- Production: 10,000 tonnes of bauxite
- Financial year: 2008

History
- Opened: 1965

Owner
- Company: Asociația Mineral West

The Dobrești mine is a large mine in the northwest of Romania in Bihor County, 55 km (34 mi) southwest of Oradea and 629 km (391 mi) north of the capital, Bucharest. Dobrești represents the largest bauxite reserve in Romania having estimated reserves of 10 million tonnes. Opened in 1965, the mine, which employed 2,000 workers, produced 140,000 tonnes of bauxite per year. After a reduction in workforce to 700 in 1997, the mine closed in 1999.
