= Copăcioasa =

Copăcioasa may refer to several places in Romania:

- Copăcioasa, a village in Scoarța Commune, Gorj County
- Copăcioasa, a village in Florești Commune, Mehedinți County
- Copăcioasa, a tributary of the river Berivoi in Brașov County

== See also ==
- Copăceni (disambiguation)
