= Pârâul Domnului =

- Location within Romania

Location
- Country: Romania
- Counties: Bihor County
- Villages: Forosig

Physical characteristics
- Source
  - coordinates: 46°49′41″N 22°05′11″E
  - elevation: 205 m (673 ft)
- Mouth: Holod
  - coordinates: 46.7697°N 22.1095°E
- Length: 11 km (6.8 mi)
- Basin size: 13 km^{2} (5.0 sq mi)

Basin features
- Progression: Holod→ Crișul Negru→ Körös→ Tisza→ Danube→ Black Sea

The Pârâul Domnului is a right tributary of the river Holod in Romania. It flows into the Holod near the village Holod. Its length is 11 km (6.8 mi) and its basin size is 13 km^{2} (5.0 sq mi).
