= Topa (river) =

- Location within Romania

Location
- Country: Romania
- Counties: Bihor County
- Villages: Vârciorog, Corbești, Topa de Sus, Cornișești, Rogoz

Physical characteristics
- Source
  - coordinates: 47°00′06″N 22°20′07″E
  - elevation: 436 m (1,430 ft)
- Mouth: Holod
  - location: Copăceni
  - coordinates: 46°46′38″N 22°10′06″E
  - elevation: 131 m (430 ft)
- Length: 38 km (24 mi)
- Basin size: 276 km^{2} (107 sq mi)

Basin features
- Progression: Holod→ Crișul Negru→ Körös→ Tisza→ Danube→ Black Sea

The Topa is a right tributary of the river Holod in Romania. It flows into the Holod near Copăceni. Its length is 38 km (24 mi) and its basin size is 276 km^{2} (107 sq mi).

== Tributaries ==
The following rivers are tributaries to the Topa:

- Left: Miniș, Poiana, Rogoazele, Vârciorog, Valea Copilului, Valea lui Vasile
- Right: Valea Codrului, Pietroasa, Valea Mare, Cârpeștii Mici, Valea Florii
