= Surducu =

Surducu may refer to one of two places in Romania:

- Surducu Mare, a village in Forotic Commune, Caraș-Severin County
- Surducu Mic, a village in Traian Vuia Commune, Timiș County

== See also ==
- Surdu (disambiguation)
- Surduc (disambiguation)
- Surdila (disambiguation)
- Surdești (disambiguation)
