= Mazyad =

Mazyad may refer to:

- The eponymous ancestor of the Banu Mazyad, dynasty that ruled Hilla in the 10th–11th centuries
- The ancestor of the Yazidids, dynasty that ruled Shirvan in the 9th–14th centuries
- Mezyad, Al-Ain, or Mazyad, a settlement in Abu Dhabi, UAE
- Mazyad Freeh (born 1989), Saudia Arabian footballer
- Mohammed Mazyad (born 1991), Saudia Arabian footballer

== See also ==
- Meziad
