= Surdu =

Surdu may refer to:

- An alternative spelling of surdo, a Brazilian drum
- Romeo Surdu, (born 1984), Romanian footballer
- Victor Surdu (1947 – 2011), Romanian politician who served as the country's first post-Communist Minister of Agriculture
- Surdu River, a tributary of the Râul Mare in Romania

== Surdul ==
- Ștefan Surdul, Ruler of Wallachia from May 1591 to August 1592

== See also ==
- Surduc (disambiguation)
- Surducu (disambiguation)
- Surdila (disambiguation)
- Surdești (disambiguation)
