= Meziad (river) =

Tributary of the river Valea Roșie in Romania

- Location within Romania

Location
- Country: Romania
- Counties: Bihor County
- Villages: Meziad, Remetea

Physical characteristics
- Source: Mount Porcu
  - location: Pădurea Craiului Mountains
  - coordinates: 46°47′00″N 22°32′15″E
  - elevation: 828 m (2,717 ft)
- Mouth: Valea Roșie
  - location: Remetea
  - coordinates: 46°44′24″N 22°20′54″E
  - elevation: 192 m (630 ft)
- Length: 19 km (12 mi)
- Basin size: 61 km^{2} (24 sq mi)

Basin features
- Progression: Valea Roșie→ Crișul Negru→ Körös→ Tisza→ Danube→ Black Sea

The Meziad is a river in Bihor County, western Romania. It is a left tributary of the river Valea Roșie. It flows into the Valea Roșie in Remetea. Its length is 19 km (12 mi) and its basin size is 61 km^{2} (24 sq mi).
