= Șoimuș (Crișul Negru) =

- Location within Romania

Location
- Country: Romania
- Counties: Bihor County
- Villages: Lazuri

Physical characteristics
- Source: Pădurea Craiului Mountains, Dealul Acru
  - coordinates: 46°48′56″N 22°31′52″E
  - elevation: 870 m (2,850 ft)
- Mouth: Valea Roșie
  - location: Downstream of Roșia
  - coordinates: 46°47′24″N 22°23′25″E
  - elevation: 231 m (758 ft)
- Length: 17 km (11 mi)
- Basin size: 43 km^{2} (17 sq mi)

Basin features
- Progression: Valea Roșie→ Crișul Negru→ Körös→ Tisza→ Danube→ Black Sea
- Tributaries
  - right: Toplicioara, Stugaru

The Șoimuș is a left tributary of the river Valea Roșie in Romania. It flows into the Valea Roșie near Roșia. Its length is 17 km (11 mi) and its basin size is 43 km^{2} (17 sq mi).
