= Vârciorog Waterfall =

Protected area in Romania

- Cascada Vârciorog
- IUCN category IV (habitat/species management area)
- Location within Romania
- Location: Alba County, Romania
- Nearest city: Câmpeni
- Coordinates: 46.4796°N 22.6919°E

The Vârciorog Waterfall is a tourist attraction and a protected area, located in the Apuseni Natural Park, Romania. It is situated on a small right tributary of the river Arieșul Mare, near the village Vanvucești. The waterfall is 15 m high.
