= Dobrești, Bihor =

Dobrești
- Commune
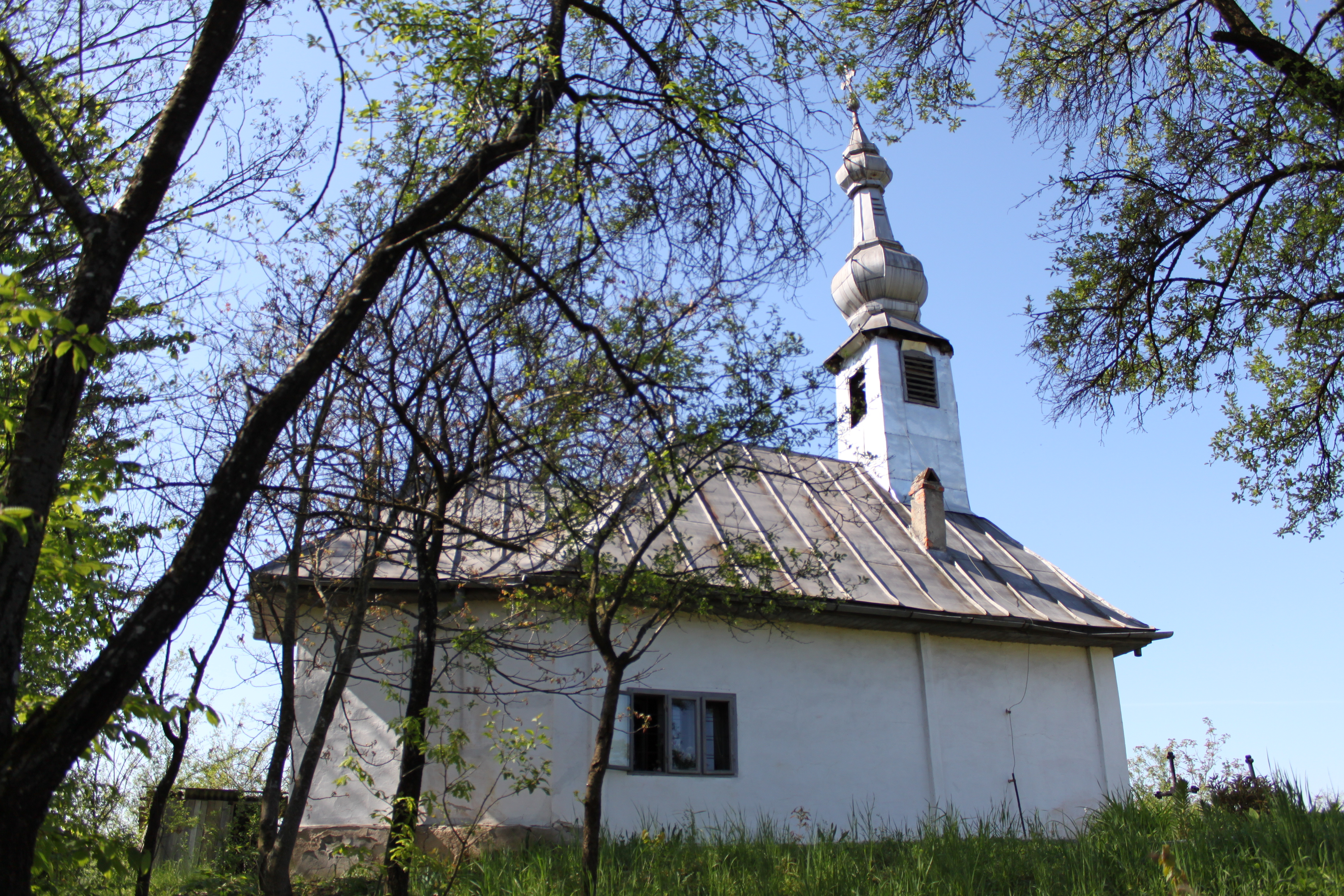
- Wooden church in Luncasprie village

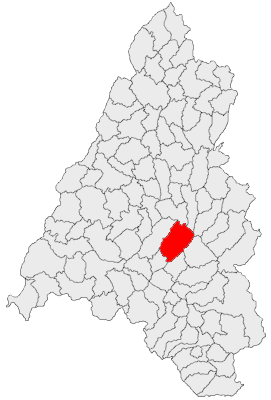
- Location in Bihor County

- Location in Romania
- Coordinates: 46.8474°N 22.2788°E
- Country: Romania
- County: Bihor

Government
  - Mayor (2020–2024): Florin Copos (PNL)
- Area: 133.48 km^{2} (51.54 sq mi)
- Elevation: 161 m (528 ft)
- Population (2021-12-01): 5,307
  - Density: 39.76/km^{2} (103.0/sq mi)
- Time zone: UTC+02:00 (EET)
  - Summer (DST): UTC+03:00 (EEST)
- Postal code: 417240
- Area code: +40 x59
- Vehicle reg.: BH

Dobrești (Hungarian: Bihardobrosd) is a commune in Bihor County, Crișana, Romania with a population of 5,307 people (2021). It is composed of eight villages: Cornișești (Nagykerpesd), Crâncești (Karáncsfalva), Dobrești, Hidișel (Nánhegyes), Luncasprie (Lankás), Răcaș (Lankástanya), Topa de Jos (Alsótopa), and Topa de Sus (Felsőtopa).

== Geography ==
The commune is located in the south-central part of Bihor County, 47 km (29 mi) southeast of the county seat, Oradea. Dobrești is situated in the foothills of the Pădurea Craiului Mountains. It lies on the banks of the river Holod, and its right tributary, the river Topa; the river Valea lui Vasile flows into the Topa in Hidișel village.

== Economy ==
The Dobrești mine is located on the territory of the commune. Opened in 1965, the mine, which employed 2,000 workers, produced 140,000 tonnes of bauxite per year; the mine closed in 1999.
