= Remetea, Bihor =

Remetea
- Commune
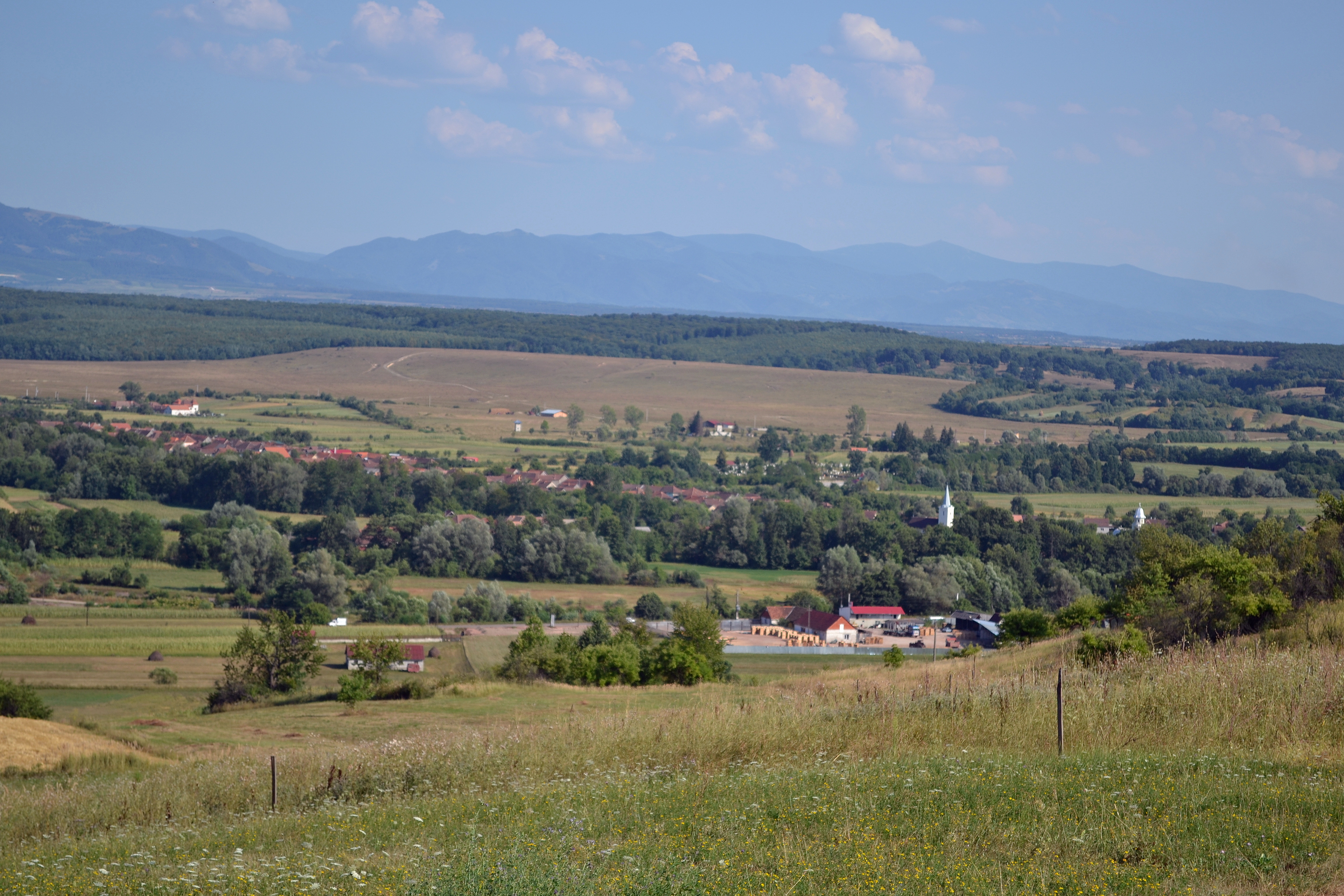

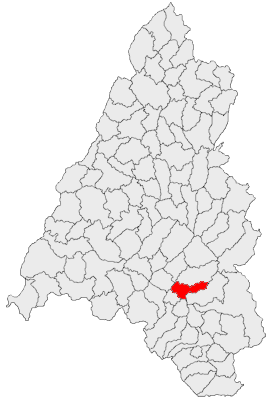
- Location in Bihor County

- Location in Romania
- Coordinates: 46°44′N 22°22′E
- Country: Romania
- County: Bihor

Government
  - Mayor (2020–2024): Ionel Stelian Copil (PSD)
- Area: 67.94 km^{2} (26.23 sq mi)
- Elevation: 193 m (633 ft)
- Population (2021-12-01): 2,715
  - Density: 39.96/km^{2} (103.5/sq mi)
- Time zone: UTC+02:00 (EET)
  - Summer (DST): UTC+03:00 (EEST)
- Postal code: 417410
- Area code: +40 x59
- Vehicle reg.: BH
- Website: remetea-bh.ro

Remetea (Hungarian: Magyarremete) is a commune in Bihor County, Crișana, Romania. It is composed of five villages: Drăgoteni (Drágota), Meziad (Mézged), Petreasa (Petrász), Remetea, and Șoimuș (Gyepüsolymos).

== Geography ==
The commune is located in the southern part of the county, at the edge of the Apuseni Mountains, in the foothills of the Pădurea Craiului Mountains. It lies on the banks of the Valea Roșie River, a tributary of the Crișul Negru; the Meziad River flows into the Valea Roșie in Remetea.

The nearest town is Beiuș, around 10 kilometres (6.2 miles) to the south. Remetea is crossed by county road DJ764, which joins Beiuș to the town of Aleșd; county road DJ764C connects the commune to Meziad village to the east. The county seat, Oradea, is 64 km (40 mi) to the northwest.

== Population ==
According to the 2011 census, the commune had a population of 2,906 inhabitants; of those, 76.67% were Romanians, 15.79% Hungarians, 5.71% Roma, and 1.69% others. The percentage of Hungarians was higher in Remetea village. At the 2021 census, there were 2,715 inhabitants: 77.13% Romanians, 13.44% Hungarians, and 4.68% Roma.

== Natives ==
- Nicolae Bolcaș (1882–1919), deputy at the Great National Assembly of Alba Iulia
- Marțian Dan (1935–2002), politician and university professor
- Károly Fila (born 1996), footballer
