= Holod (river) =

Holod Vida
- Location within Romania

Location
- Country: Romania
- Counties: Bihor County

Physical characteristics
- Source: Pădurea Craiului Mountains
  - coordinates: 46°54′23″N 22°27′04″E
  - elevation: 621 m (2,037 ft)
- Mouth: Crișul Negru
  - location: Upstream of Râpa
  - coordinates: 46°46′15″N 22°01′48″E
  - elevation: 121 m (397 ft)
- Length: 49 km (30 mi)
- Basin size: 568 km^{2} (219 sq mi)

Basin features
- Progression: Crișul Negru→ Körös→ Tisza→ Danube→ Black Sea
- Tributaries
  - right: Topa

The Holod is a right tributary of the river Crișul Negru in Romania. It discharges into the Crișul Negru in Râpa. Its length is 49 km (30 mi) and its basin size is 568 km^{2} (219 sq mi). The upper reach of the river, upstream of the village of Luncasprie is known as the Vida. The Vida dam is located on this river. The Holod flows through the villages Luncasprie, Sitani, Pomezeu, Spinuș de Pomezeu, Coșdeni, Albești, Răbăgani, Brătești, Vărășeni, Copăceni, Vintere, Holod and Dumbrava.

== Tributaries ==
The following rivers are tributaries to the Holod:

- Left: Cornet, Hârja
- Right: Blajul, Videști, Topa, Hidișel, Pârâul Domnului
