= Topa (surname) =

Topa or Țopa is a surname with multiple origins. Notable people with the surname include:

- António Topa (1954–2021), Portuguese politician
- Bartłomiej Topa (born 1967), Polish actor
- Justin Topa (born 1991), American baseball player
- Tudor Țopa (born 1932), Moldovan politician and journalist
