= Perfluorobutanesulfonyl fluoride =

Names
- Preferred IUPAC name 1,1,2,2,3,3,4,4,4-Nonafluorobutane-1-sulfonyl fluoride

Identifiers
CAS Number	375-72-4
3D model (JSmol)	Interactive image
Abbreviations	NfF
ChemSpider	61131
ECHA InfoCard	100.006.175
EC Number	206-792-6
PubChem CID	67814
UNII	WC4FPA9BCM
CompTox Dashboard (EPA)	DTXSID20861913
- InChI: InChI=1S/C4F10O2S/c5-1(6,3(9,10)11)2(7,8)4(12,13)17(14,15)16 Key: LUYQYZLEHLTPBH-UHFFFAOYSA-N; InChI=1/C4F10O2S/c5-1(6,3(9,10)11)2(7,8)4(12,13)17(14,15)16 Key: LUYQYZLEHLTPBH-UHFFFAOYAE
- SMILES: C(C(C(F)(F)S(=O)(=O)F)(F)F)(C(F)(F)F)(F)F

Properties
Chemical formula	C_{4}F_{10}O_{2}S
Molar mass	302.09 g·mol^{−1}
Density	1.682 g/mL
Melting point	< −120 °C (−184 °F; 153 K)
Boiling point	65 to 66 °C (149 to 151 °F; 338 to 339 K)

Related compounds
- Except where otherwise noted, data are given for materials in their standard state (at 25 °C [77 °F], 100 kPa). verify (what is ?) Infobox references

Perfluorobutanesulfonyl fluoride (nonafluorobutanesulfonyl fluoride, NfF) is a colorless, volatile liquid that is immiscible with water but soluble in common organic solvents. It is prepared by the electrochemical fluorination of sulfolane. NfF serves as an entry point to nonafluorobutanesulfonates (nonaflates), which are valuable as electrophiles in palladium catalyzed cross coupling reactions. As a perfluoroalkylsulfonylating agent, NfF offers the advantages of lower cost and greater stability over the more frequently used triflic anhydride. The fluoride leaving group is readily substituted by nucleophiles such as amines, phenoxides, and enolates, giving sulfonamides, aryl nonaflates, and alkenyl nonaflates, respectively. However, it is not attacked by water (in which it is stable at pH<12). Hydrolysis by barium hydroxide gives Ba(ONf)_{2}, which upon treatment with sulfuric acid gives perfluorobutanesulfonic acid and insoluble barium sulfate.

== Purification ==

Commercially available NfF is contaminated with 6-10 mol % perfluorosulfolane derived from its production. This is readily removed by vigorously stirring the commercial material with a concentrated aqueous solution of K_{3}PO_{4} and K_{2}HPO_{4} in a 1:1 molar ratio for 96 hours. This treatment, followed by removal of the aqueous layer and distillation from P_{2}O_{5}, gives a product that contains >99 mol % NfF with near quantitative recovery.

== Synthesis of aryl and alkenyl nonaflates ==
As mentioned above, aryl and alkenyl nonaflates are useful as electrophiles in palladium catalyzed cross coupling reactions. Their reactivity generally mirrors that of the more commonly encountered triflate electrophiles, but nonaflates tend to be less prone to hydrolysis to ketones (in the case of alkenyl sulfonates) and phenols (in the case of aryl sulfonates). Their resistance to hydrolysis makes nonaflates superior electrophiles in Buchwald-Hartwig couplings, where this side reaction can be deleterious to yields of the desired product.

The sodium enolates of β-ketoesters react with 1.15 equivalents of NfF to give the corresponding alkenyl nonaflates in high yield. Ethyl 2-methylacetoacetate (R=R'=Me) gives the geometrically pure E isomer by this method.

Simple aldehydes and ketones react with NfF in the presence of bases such as DBU or phosphazenes to give alkenyl nonaflates in high yields without formation of a discrete enolate. Use of the P_{2} phosphazene base at -30 to -20 °C gives the less substituted alkenyl nonaflate with unsymmetrically substituted ketones. Similar reactions with triflic anhydride generally require the use of the expensive 2,6-di-tert-butylpyridine to achieve high yields.

The reaction of enolates with NfF depends strongly both on the structure of the enolate and its metal counterion. The lithium enolates of methyl ketones give mixtures of products derived from electrophilic attack on the O (expected) or C (unexpected) atoms of the enolate. This effect is particularly evident with the lithium enolate of pinacolone, which gives a 2:1 mixture favoring C-attack. More substituted lithium enolates give only products of O sulfonylation in variable yields.

Trimethylsilyl enol ethers react with NfF in the presence of a substoichiometric fluoride source at 0 °C to ambient temperature to give alkenyl nonaflates in moderate to good yields. Dried tetra-n-butylammonium fluoride was the preferred fluoride source in one study, but CsF has been used in difficult cases with excellent results.

Aryl nonaflates can be prepared straightforwardly from phenols and NfF in the presence of bases such as potassium carbonate and Et_{3}N in near quantitative yields. Stronger bases such as NaH and BuLi can also be used, but they tend to give somewhat lower yields.

== Reaction with alcohols ==
The reaction of NfF with alcohols highlights the lability of alkyl nonaflates – in most cases, the final product of the reaction is either an alkyl fluoride (from F^{−} attack on the intermediate alkyl nonaflate) or an olefin (from elimination of NfOH from the intermediate nonaflate). It has recently been discovered that upon reaction of NfF with alcohols to generate alkyl nonaflate, the released F^{−} can be used to activate trimethylsilyl-bound nucleophiles in situ to produce several deoxy-diversified products.

== Synthesis of bis-nonafluorobutanesulfonimide (Nf_{2}NH) ==
NfF reacts with ammonium chloride in the presence of triethylamine in acetonitrile to give the triethylammonium salt of the superacidic bis-nonafluorobutanesulfonimide in 97% yield. The corresponding potassium salt is obtained by treatment of a methanolic solution of the triethylammonium salt with KOH. The acid is obtained by ion exchange chromatography of the triethylammonium salt with Amberlite IR-100 as the stationary phase and methanol as the eluent. The actual species produced in the latter procedure is likely MeOH_{2}^{+} Nf_{2}N^{−}.
