= TOP Assay =

Laboratory analysis method

The TOP Assay (Total Oxidizable Precursor Assay) is a laboratory method developed in 2012 that oxidatively converts (unknown) precursor compounds of perfluorocarboxylic acids (PFCAs) into the latter. This makes quantification possible. Potassium peroxodisulfate is used. This sum parameter can be used to determine the concentration of precursor compounds present by comparing the sample before and after the application of the TOP Assay.

Example of oxidation of polyfluorinated compounds (6:2 FTOH, 6:2 FTS, 6:2 FTAB, 6:2 diPAP) using the TOP Assay to form PFCAs

== Application ==
This method is used, for example, in the analysis of fire-fighting foams (aqueous film forming foam), textiles or water samples. Blood serum can also be analyzed in this way.

Neutral, anionic and cationic precursor compounds may be distinguished using an extension of the method published in 2025.

In addition to fluorotelomer compounds, hydrogen-substituted perfluorosulfonic acids (H_{n}-PFSAs), for example, can also be oxidized using the TOP Assay. Saturated and unsaturated perfluorosulfonic acids as well as perfluoroalkyl ether sulfonic acids, on the other hand, are stable.
