= Răbăgani =

- Commune
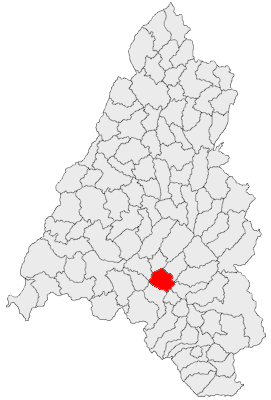
- Location in Bihor County

- Location in Romania
- Coordinates: 46°45′N 22°14′E
- Country: Romania
- County: Bihor
- Population (2021-12-01): 1,997
- Time zone: EET/EEST (UTC+2/+3)
- Vehicle reg.: BH

Răbăgani (Hungarian: Robogány) is a commune in Bihor County, Crișana, Romania. It is composed of six villages: Albești (Fehérlak), Brătești, Răbăgani, Săliște de Pomezeu (Papmezőszeleste), Săucani (Szokány) and Vărășeni (Veresfalva). It is located about 50 km south of Oradea. It was mostly Hungarian until 1955, when it became equally split 50/50 with the Romanian community. In 2002, it was 94.2% Romanian and 5.7% Roma.
