= Căpâlna =

Căpâlna Feketekápolna
- Commune
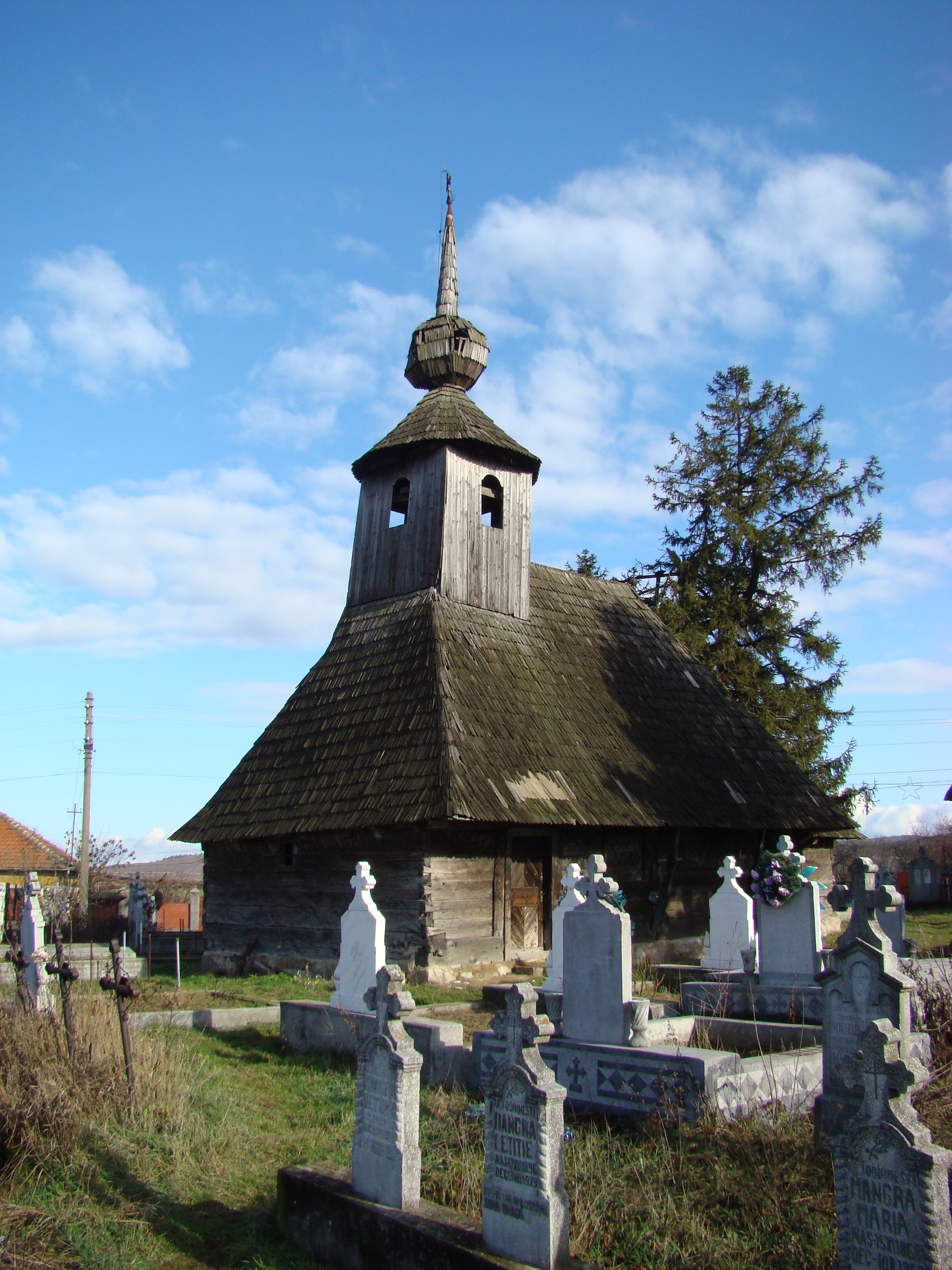
- The wooden church of Săldăbagiu Mic

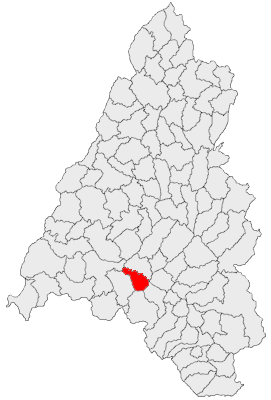
- Location within Bihor County

- Location in Romania
- Coordinates: 46°44′6″N 22°6′13″E
- Country: Romania
- County: Bihor

Government
  - Mayor (2020–2024): Gheorghe Ioan Vid (PSD)
- Area: 54.89 km^{2} (21.19 sq mi)
- Population (2021-12-01): 1,282
  - Density: 23.36/km^{2} (60.49/sq mi)
- Time zone: UTC+02:00 (EET)
  - Summer (DST): UTC+03:00 (EEST)
- Postal code: 417130
- Area code: +40 x59
- Vehicle reg.: BH
- Website: primaria-capilnabh.ro

Căpâlna (Hungarian: Feketekápolna) is a commune in Bihor County, Crișana, Romania with a population of 1,282 people (2021). It is composed of five villages: Căpâlna, Ginta (Gyanta), Rohani (Rohány), Săldăbagiu Mic (Körösszáldobágy), and Suplacu de Tinca (Tenkeszéplak). The commune is situated in the southern part of Bihor County, on the right bank of the Crișul Negru, at a distance of 40 km (25 mi) from the county seat, Oradea, 26 km (16 mi) from Beiuș, and 40 km (25 mi) from Salonta.

== Demographics ==
=== Population by villages ===
Căpâlna commune had a population of 1,663 at the 2011 census, which was divided into villages as follows:

- 466 (Săldăbagiu Mic)
- 411 (Suplacu de Tinca)
- 333 (Căpâlna)
- 309 (Ginta)
- 144 (Rohani)

=== Ethnic structure ===
Căpâlna commune had a population of 1,663 in 2011, of which:

- 79% are Romanian
- 14% are Hungarian
- 3% are Roma.
- 4% are other.

=== Religious makeup ===
The religious makeup in 2011 was as follows:

- 75% are Romanian Orthodox
- 11% are Reformed
- 3% are Pentecostal.
- 3% are Baptist.
- 2% are Roman Catholic.
- 1% are Greek-Catholic.
- 5% are undeclared or none.

== Natives ==
- Vasile Mangra (1850–1918), cleric of the Romanian Orthodox Church and historian
