= Drăgești =

- Commune
- Tășad village

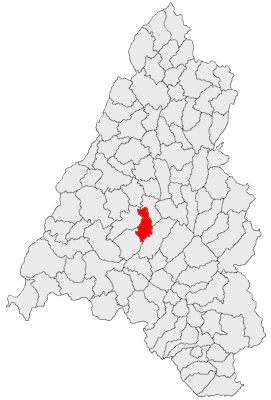
- Location in Bihor County

- Location in Romania
- Coordinates: 46.8995°N 22.1326°E
- Country: Romania
- County: Bihor

Government
  - Mayor (2024–2028): Delia Farcaș (PNL)
- Area: 52.68 km^{2} (20.34 sq mi)
- Elevation: 267 m (876 ft)
- Population (2021-12-01): 2,858
  - Density: 54.25/km^{2} (140.5/sq mi)
- Time zone: UTC+02:00 (EET)
  - Summer (DST): UTC+03:00 (EEST)
- Postal code: 417260
- Area code: (+40) 0259
- Vehicle reg.: BH
- Website: primariadragesti.ro

Drăgești (Hungarian: Drágcséke) is a commune in Bihor County, Crișana, Romania with a population of 2,858 people as of 2021. It is composed of five villages: Dicănești (Dékányos), Drăgești, Stracoș (Isztrákos), Tășad (Tasádfő), and Topești (Toposd).
