= Pocola, Bihor =

Pocola
- Commune
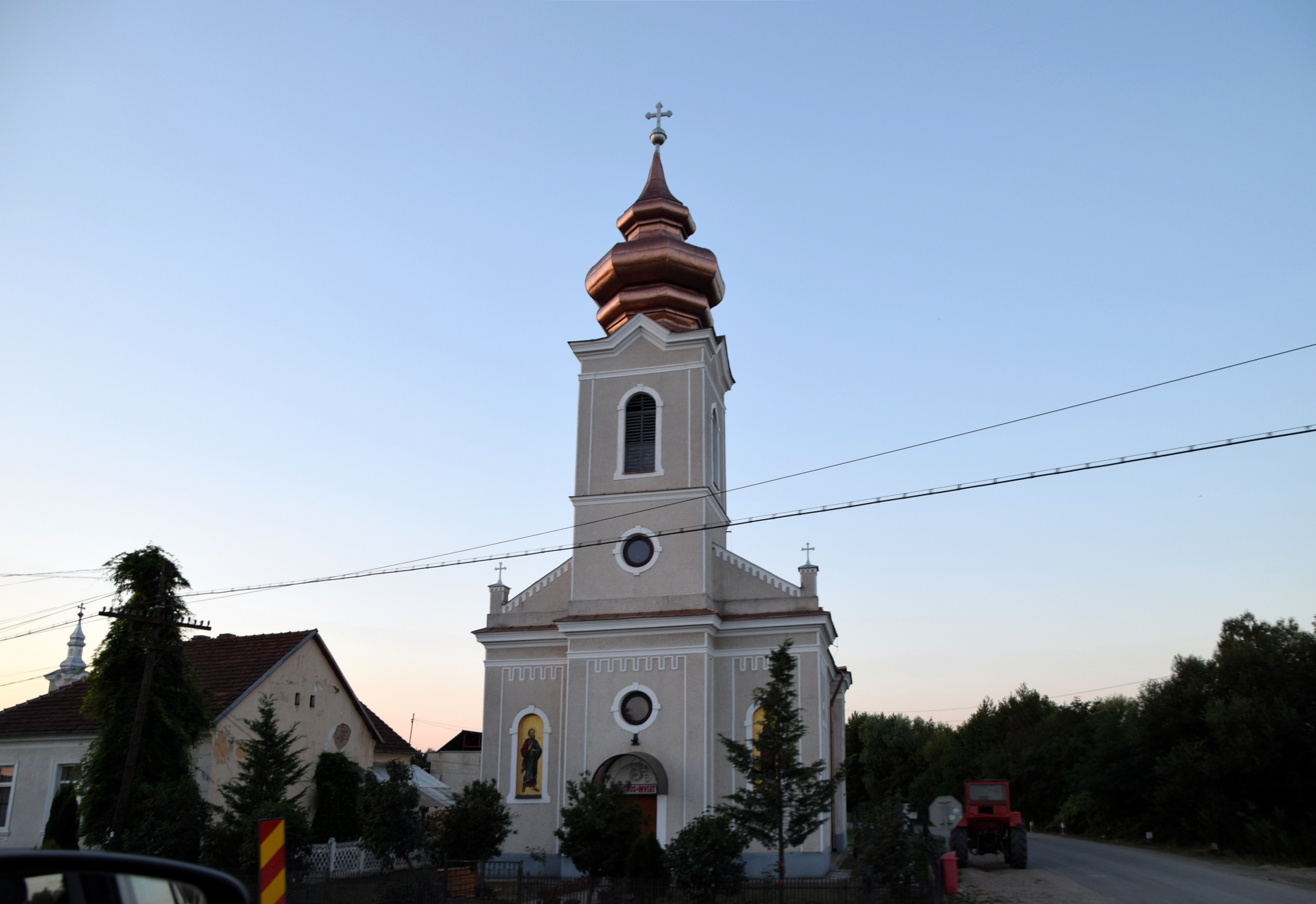
- Church in Pocola

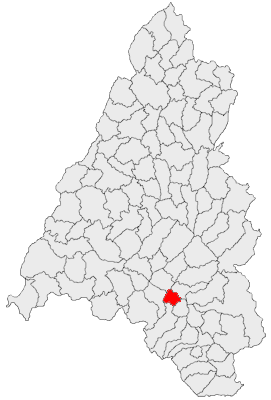
- Location in Bihor County

- Location in Romania
- Coordinates: 46°41′N 22°17′E
- Country: Romania
- County: Bihor

Government
  - Mayor (2020–2024): Vasile Birta (PSD)
- Area: 21.21 km^{2} (8.19 sq mi)
- Elevation: 168 m (551 ft)
- Population (2021-12-01): 1,395
  - Density: 65.77/km^{2} (170.3/sq mi)
- Time zone: UTC+02:00 (EET)
  - Summer (DST): UTC+03:00 (EEST)
- Postal code: 417375
- Area code: +(40) x59
- Vehicle reg.: BH
- Website: primariapocola.ro

Pocola (Hungarian: Biharpoklos) is a commune in Bihor County, Crișana, Romania with a population of 1,395 people as of 2021. It is composed of five villages: Feneriș (Fenyéres), Petrani (Pontoskő), Pocola, Poietari (Kisfenyéres), and Sânmartin de Beiuș (Belényesszentmárton).
