= Holod, Bihor =

Holod
- Commune
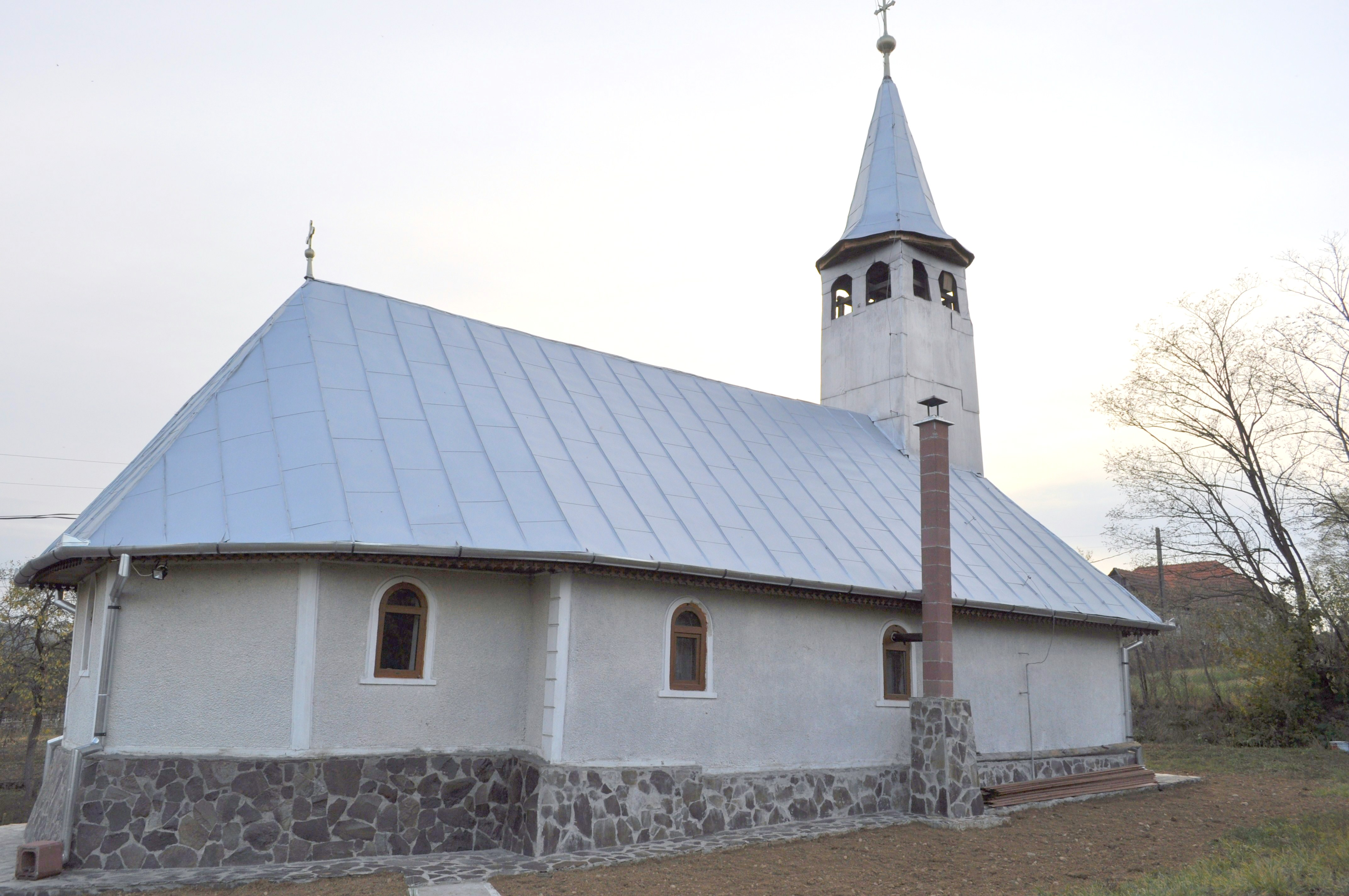
- Wooden church in Dumbrăvița

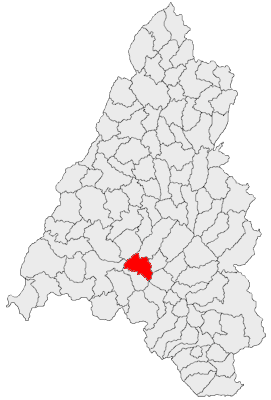
- Location in Bihor County

- Location in Romania
- Coordinates: 46°47′N 22°8′E
- Country: Romania
- County: Bihor

Government
  - Mayor (2020–2024): Sandu-Felician Săsăran (PNL)
- Area: 66.07 km^{2} (25.51 sq mi)
- Elevation: 158 m (518 ft)
- Population (2021-12-01): 3,221
  - Density: 48.75/km^{2} (126.3/sq mi)
- Time zone: UTC+02:00 (EET)
  - Summer (DST): UTC+03:00 (EEST)
- Postal code: 417280
- Area code: +(40) 259
- Vehicle reg.: BH
- Website: holod.ro

Holod (Hungarian: Pusztahollód) is a commune in Bihor County, Crișana, Romania. It is composed of eight villages: Dumbrava (Tenkemocsár), Dumbrăvița (Kisdombró), Forosig (Forrószeg), Hodiș (Káptalanhodos), Holod, Lupoaia (Farkaspatak), Valea Mare de Codru (Alsópatak), and Vintere (Venter).

At the 2011 census, the commune had 3,309 inhabitants; of those, 77.2% were Romanians, 21.3% Roma, and 0.8% Hungarians. At the 2021 census, Holod had a population of 3,221, of which 87.24% were Romanians and 2.39% Roma.

== History ==
Holod was first mentioned in a document in 1326, under the name Hydus; it is also recorded in the papal tithe register of 1332-1337. In the Habsburg conscription of 1552, the locality appears under the name Hydastelek.

== Natives ==
- Gheorghe Dărăban (1946–2017), footballer, football manager, and PE teacher
- Iuliu Hirțea (1914–1978), Romanian bishop of the Greek-Catholic Church
- Iosif Vulcan (1841–1907), magazine editor, poet, playwright, and novelist

== Gallery ==
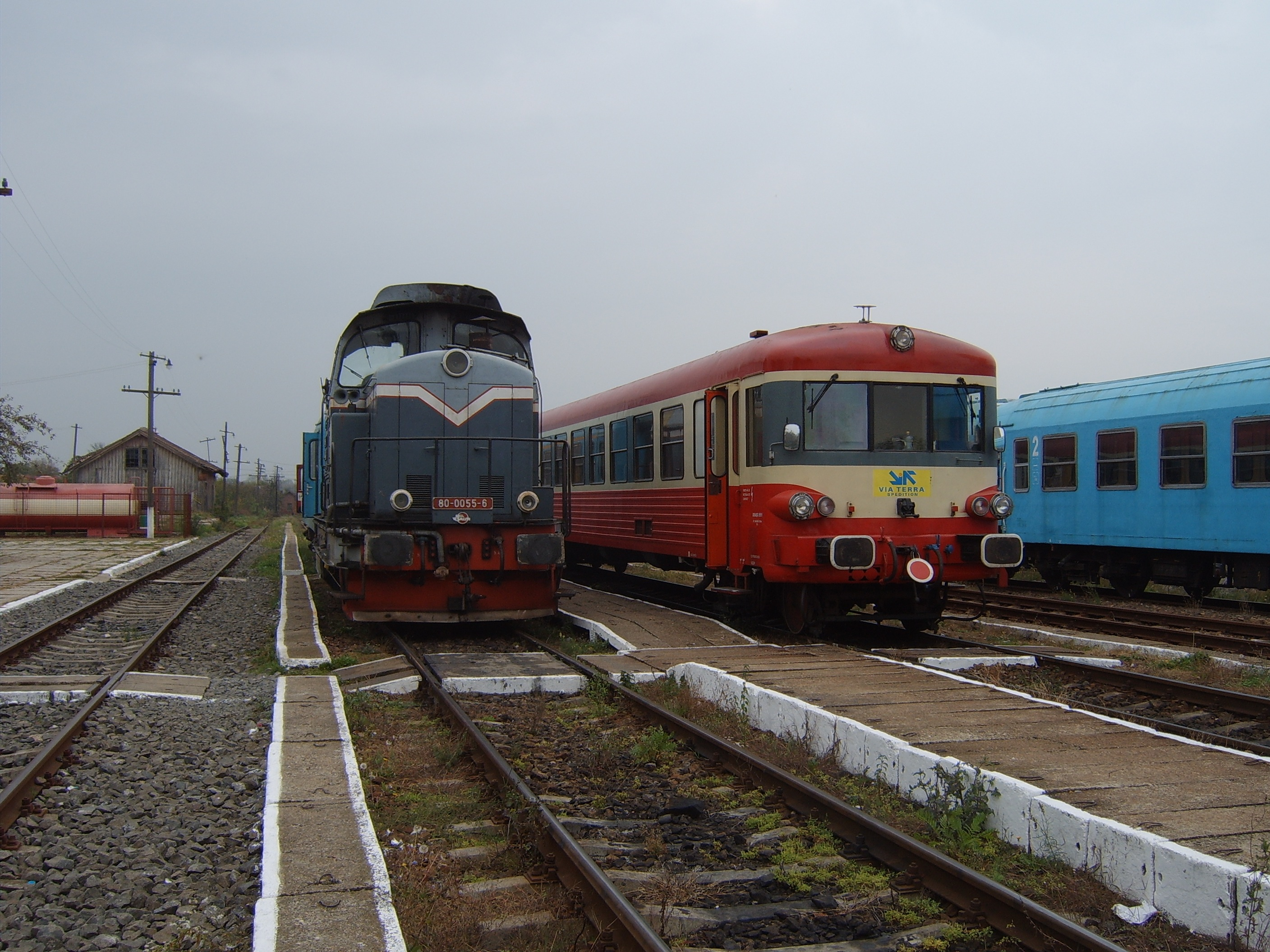
Holod train station

Main street in Valea Mare de Codru

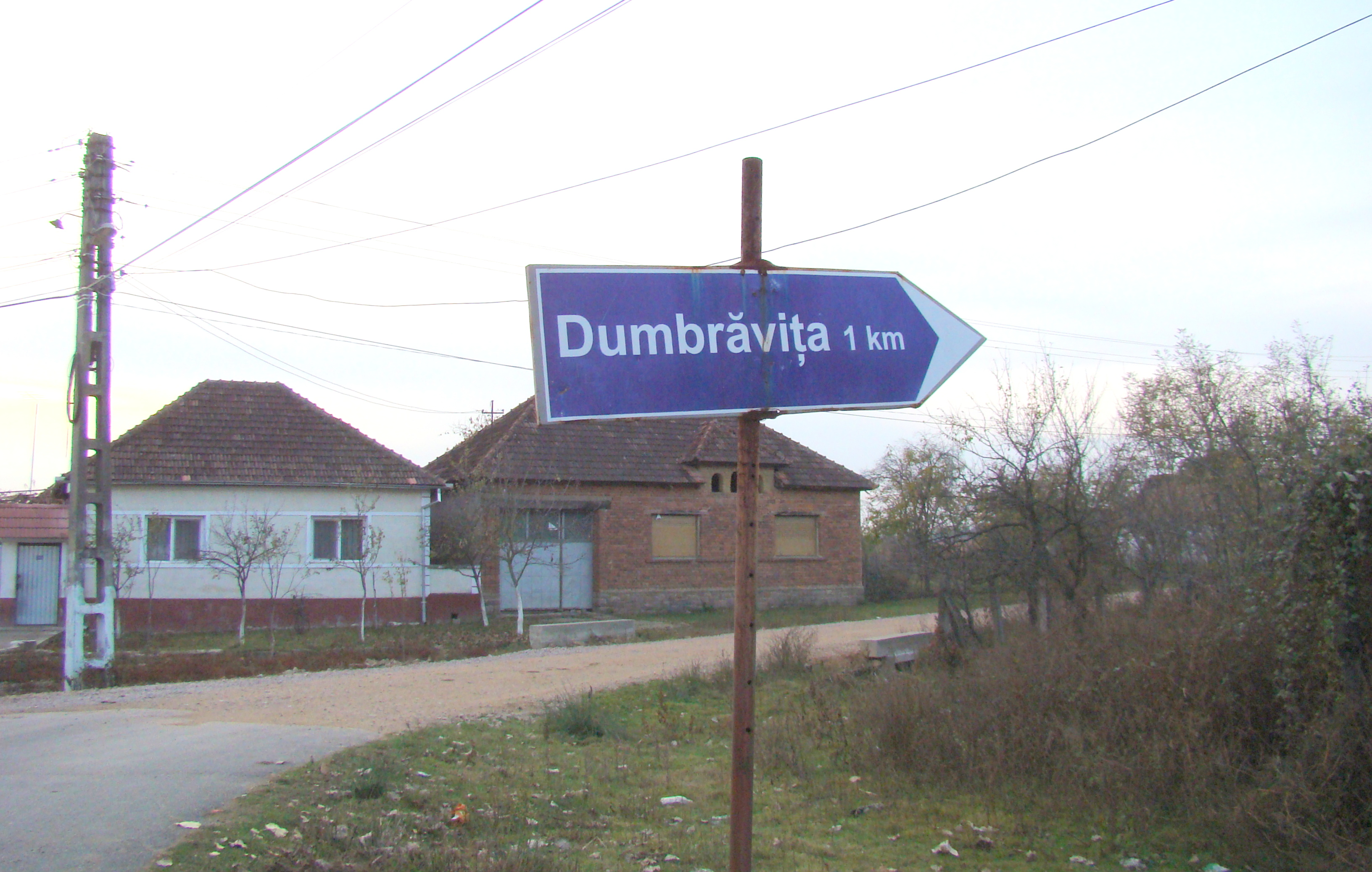
Houses in Dumbrăvița
