= Sâmbăta =

- Commune
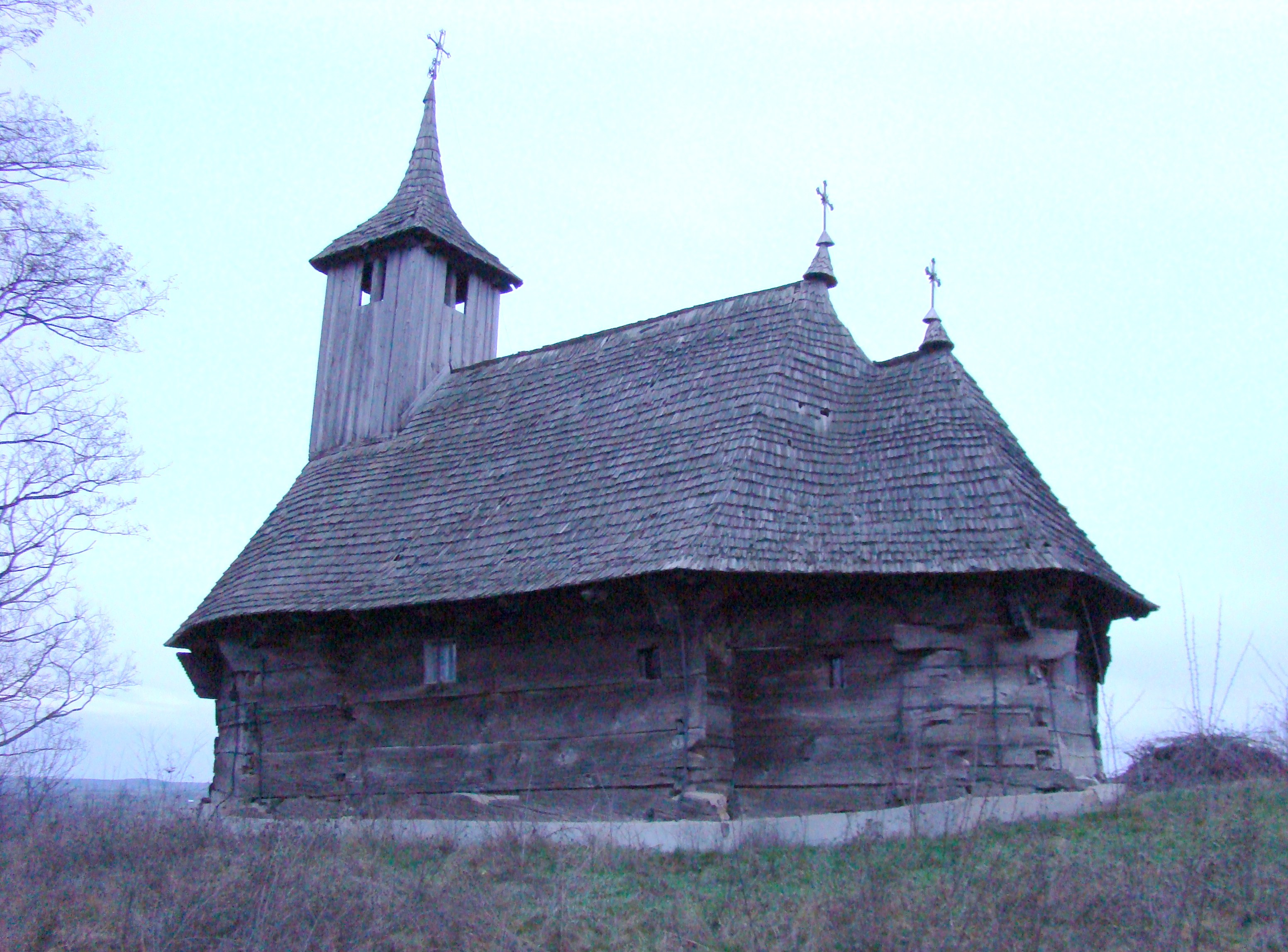
- Wooden church in Copăceni

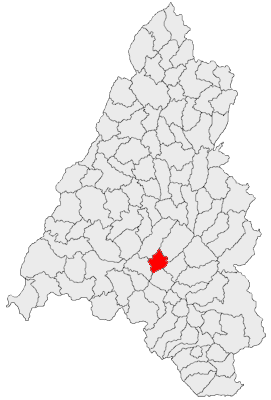
- Location in Bihor County

- Location in Romania
- Coordinates: 46°48′N 22°12′E
- Country: Romania
- County: Bihor

Government
  - Mayor (2020–2024): Mariana Laza (PSD)
- Area: 29.95 km^{2} (11.56 sq mi)
- Elevation: 143 m (469 ft)
- Population (2021-12-01): 1,267
  - Density: 42.30/km^{2} (109.6/sq mi)
- Time zone: UTC+02:00 (EET)
  - Summer (DST): UTC+03:00 (EEST)
- Postal code: 417455
- Vehicle reg.: BH

Sâmbăta (Hungarian: Szombatság) is a commune in Bihor County, Crișana, Romania with a population of 1,267 people as of 2021. It is composed of six villages: Copăceni (Kapocsány), Ogești (Csékehodos), Rogoz (Venterrogoz), Rotărești (Kerekesfalva), Sâmbăta, and Zăvoiu (Törpefalva).
