= Copăcel =

- Commune
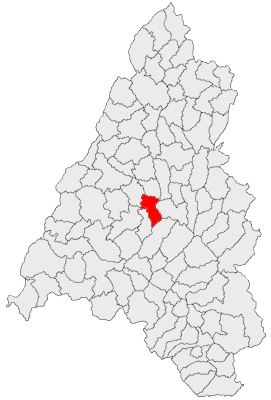
- Location in Bihor County

- Location in Romania
- Coordinates: 47°N 22.15°E
- Country: Romania
- County: Bihor
- Population (2021-12-01): 2,002
- Time zone: EET/EEST (UTC+2/+3)
- Vehicle reg.: BH

Copăcel (Hungarian: Kiskopács) is a commune in Bihor County, Crișana, Romania with a population of 2,297 people. It is composed of six villages: Bucuroaia (Bokorvány), Chijic (Kegyek), Copăcel, Poiana Tășad (Kopácsmező), Sărand (Szaránd) and Surduc (Élesdszurdok).
