= Vârciorog =

- Commune
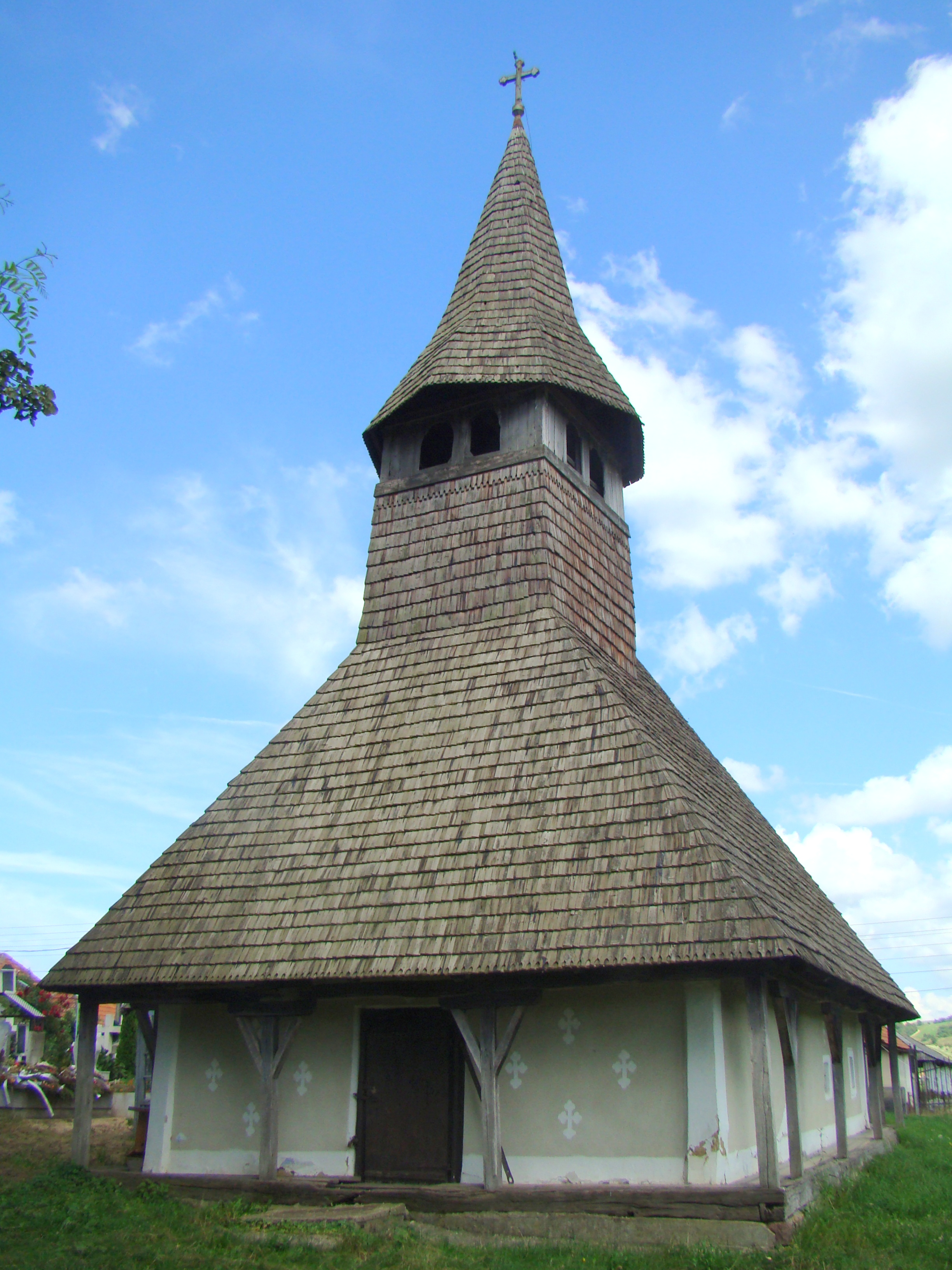
- Wooden church in Vârciorog village

- Location in Bihor County

- Location in Romania
- Coordinates: 46°58′N 22°18′E
- Country: Romania
- County: Bihor

Government
  - Mayor (2020–2024): Vasile Cociuba (PNL)
- Area: 80.81 km^{2} (31.20 sq mi)
- Elevation: 376 m (1,234 ft)
- Population (2021-12-01): 2,003
  - Density: 24.79/km^{2} (64.20/sq mi)
- Time zone: UTC+02:00 (EET)
  - Summer (DST): UTC+03:00 (EEST)
- Postal code: 417615
- Area code: +40 x59
- Vehicle reg.: BH
- Website: comunavirciorog.ro

Vârciorog (Hungarian: Vércsorog) is a commune in Bihor County, Crișana, Romania. It is composed of four villages: Fâșca (Várfancsika), Surducel (Kisszurdok), Șerghiș (Serges), and Vârciorog.

The commune is located in the central part of Bihor County, 40 km (25 mi) east of the county seat, Oradea. Nestled at the foot of the Pădurea Craiului Mountains, it lies on the banks of the river Topa; the river Vârciorog flows into the Topa in Vârciorog village.

== Population ==
At the 2021 census, Vârciorog had a population of 2,003. At the 2011 census, the commune had 2,304 inhabitants; of those, 97.27% of were ethnic Romanians. In terms of religious affiliation, 82.47% were Romanian Orthodox, 13.02% Pentecostal, and 2.34% Baptists.

== Natives ==
- Emanuel Dat (born 2001), footballer
