= Ceica =

- Commune
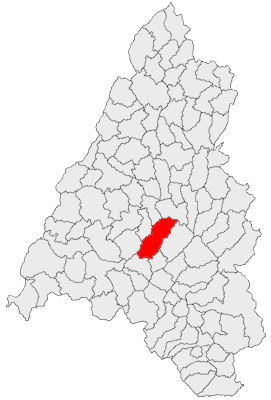
- Location in Bihor County

- Location in Romania
- Coordinates: 46°51′N 22°11′E
- Country: Romania
- County: Bihor
- Population (2021-12-01): 3,422
- Time zone: EET/EEST (UTC+2/+3)
- Vehicle reg.: BH

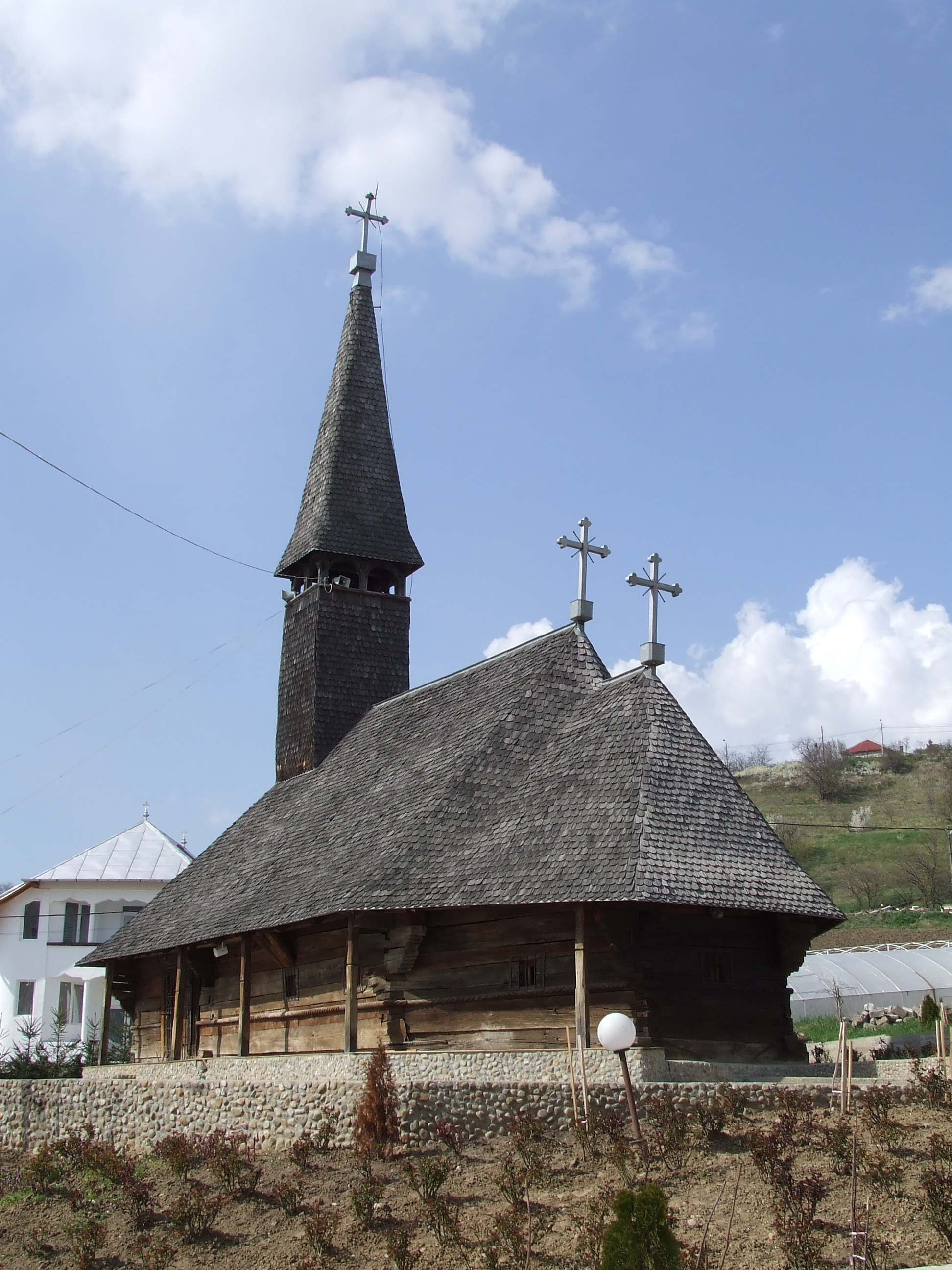
Wooden church of Corbești village, part of Ceica (moved to Oradea)

Ceica (Hungarian: Magyarcséke) is a commune in Bihor County, Crișana, Romania with a population of 3,591 people. It is composed of seven villages: Bucium (Tőkefalva), Ceica, Ceișoara (Cseszvára), Corbești (Hollószeg), Cotiglet (Kótliget), Dușești (Dusafalva) and Incești (Jancsófalva).
