= Pădurea Craiului Mountains =

Coordinates: 46°52′N 22°29′E

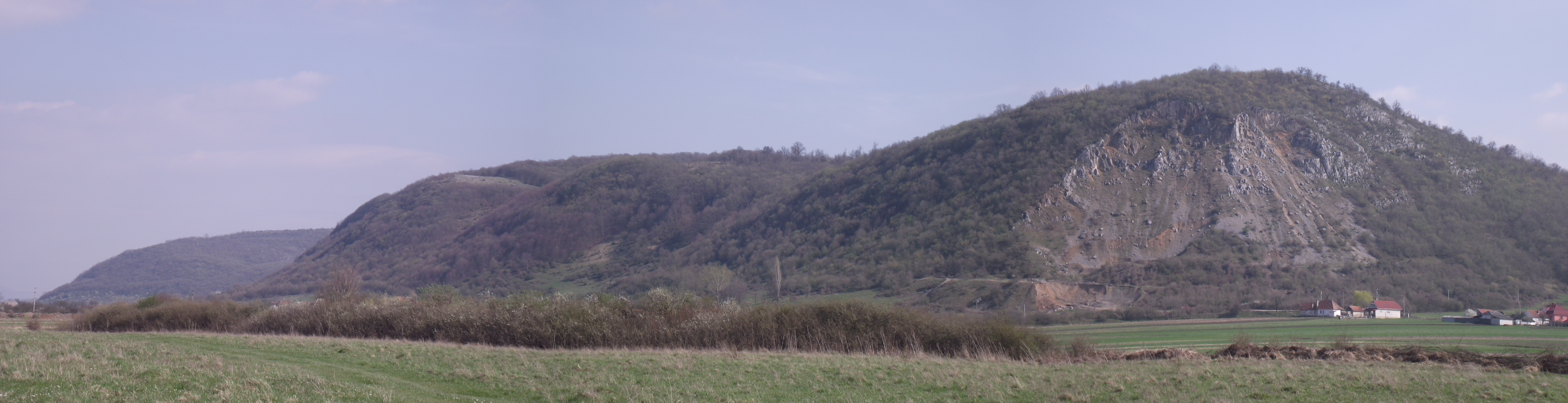
Pădurea Craiului Mountains

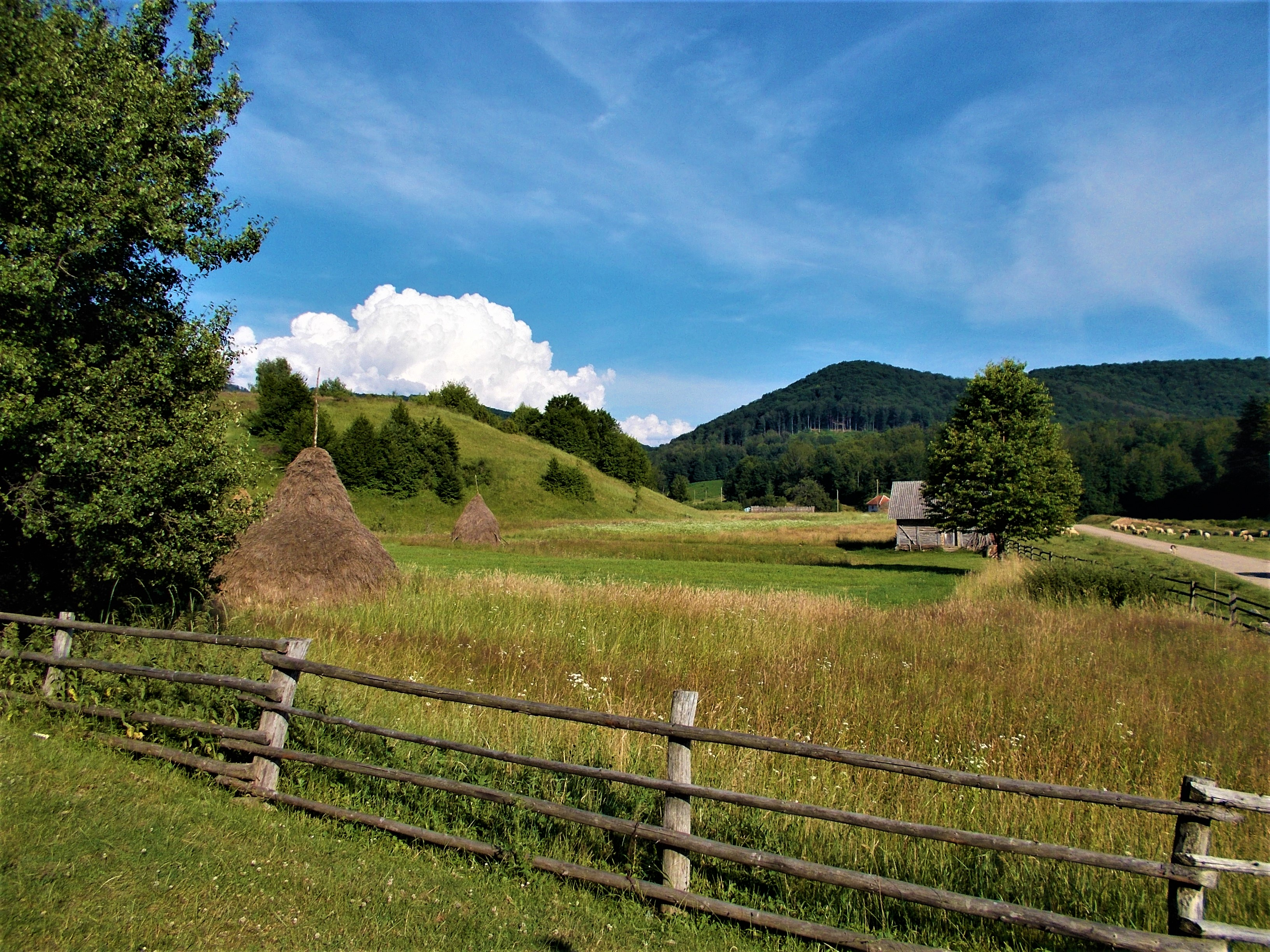
Pădurea Craiului Mountains

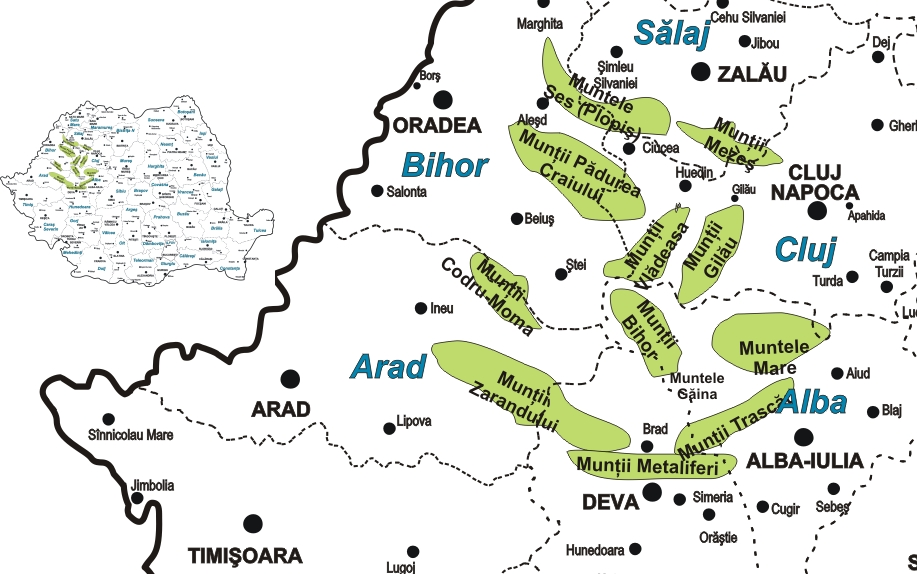
The Pădurea Craiului Mountains within the Apuseni Mountains

The Pădurea Craiului Mountains are in the northwestern part of the Apuseni Mountains of the Carpathian Mountain range, located between the Vad-Borod Depression and the Beiuș Depression. The Dealurile Vestice (Western Hills) are located to the west of these mountains, the Vlădeasa Mountains are to their south-east, and the Plopiș Mountains are to their north. The highest peak in Pădurea Craiului is the Hodrâncușa Peak at 1,027 metres (3,369 ft). The name Pădurea Craiului literally means "The Forest of the King".

The mountains cover an area of 1,150 km^{2} (440 sq mi) and are located in the central-eastern part of Bihor County, covering 15.2% of its surface area. They are also the mountainous area nearest to Oradea, which is about 35 km (22 mi) away from Vârciorog, and 60 km (37 mi) away of Șuncuiuș, two communes nestled in the Pădurea Craiului.

The Crisul Repede with its tributaries - Mniera, Galaseni, Misid, Bratcuta, Boiul and Iadul - furrow the northern slopes of the massif. All have particularly interesting courses, with important and beautiful gorges, ravines hidden in the shade of forests, bubbling springs, dry doline sections, caves and underground courses. Except for Valea Iadului, the listed courses have short lengths and cross the north and northeast of the Craiului Forest for distances that do not exceed 20 km; therefore their hydrographic basins have small areas compared to those in the south of the massif.

On the most important valley in the north of the massif - Crisul Repede - two completely different areas can be distinguished in terms of landscape: downstream from the Vadu Crisului locality where it crosses the Borodului basin and has a wide valley with a slow, winding course and upstream from the same locality, where the valley narrows, the water flows faster, a sector characteristic of a mountain valley. In this last area, between the localities of Suncuius and Vadu Crisului, Crisul Repede has carved its way with difficulty, cutting a limestone massif at a depth of over 100 m. The landscape is wild, with vertical walls that host a multitude of caves, including the Vadu Crisului Cave. This sector, known as the Crisul Repede Gorge, has been declared a natural monument.
