= Limes Porolissensis =

Roman military frontier in northwest Dacia

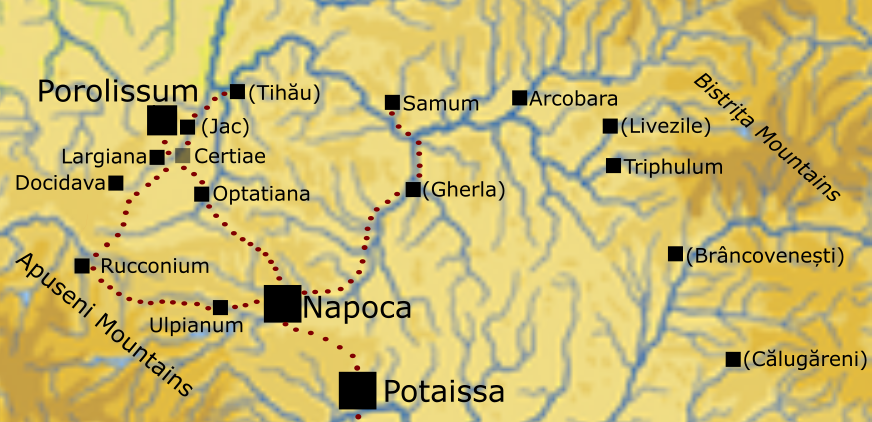
Limes Porolissensis Castra location and names. The road paths are approximate.

Located in present-day Romania, Limes Porolissensis was the frontier of the Roman Empire in Dacia Porolissensis, the northernmost of the three Dacian provinces. It was a defensive line dating from the 2nd century AD after the Conquest of Dacia up to the retreat of the Roman army from the region. The Limes was a complex network of over 200 observation towers, fortlets, palisades and ditches, and forts disposed in an arched line following the highland chain of the Meseș Mountains over 200 km from the Apuseni Mountains to Bistrița Mountains, and required as many as 16,000 soldiers to man and defend.

The Limes is named after its key defensive point: Porolissum.

It also integrated the following forts: Rucconium, Docidava, Largiana, Certiae, Castra of Jac, Castra of Tihău, Castra of Samum, Castra of Arcobara, Castra of Livezile, Triphulum, and Castra of Brâncovenești, and was supported by the castra of Ulpianum, Optatiana, Gherla, as well as being connected to the larger forts of Napoca and Potaissa.

Sections of the Limes were first discovered during the nineteenth century by the reputable Hungarian historian Károly Torma. Torma's research started from a misinterpretation of an inscription from Samum used in the construction of a local castle from which he took the expression "reg(ione) (tr)ans vall(um)" as indicating a "regio transvallum".

== Pre-Roman fortifications ==
Prior to Roman conquest of Dacia the area was guarded by hillforts reinforced with ditches and palisades. The earliest hill fortifications of this type belong to the 5th century BC, with some of these being in use during the reign of Burebista, but most were constructed during the Dacian period. Thirteen hillforts were identified in total, with the two main groups being the Meseș Mountains line and the Șimleu Massif, the latter located just outside the Roman limes line. Besides their military function they also served to monitor and control the movement of people and goods. A Dacian political-administrative centre may have developed around them, of much smaller size than the one of Orăștie Mountains region.

== Establishment ==
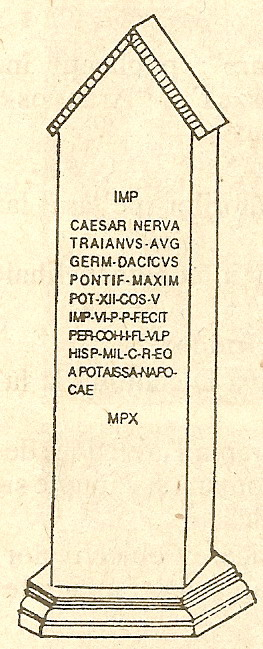
Milliarium of Aiton, a Roman milestone discovered in Aiton commune, near Cluj-Napoca, Romania. The image is the reproduction of a drawing by M. P. Szatmary done in 1758. The milestone, dated 108 AD, shows the construction of the road from Potaissa to Napoca, by demand of the Emperor Trajan. It indicates the distance of ten thousand feet (P.M.X.) to Potaissa. It is the first epigraphical attestation of the settlements of Potaissa and Napoca in Roman Dacia. The inscription was recorded in Corpus Inscriptionum Latinarum, vol.III, the text 1627, Berlin, 1863.

Almost all Roman forts and fortified structures were built around 106 CE, immediately after the conquest of Dacia, and mostly from timber. The largest fort initially was the one at Certiae (Romita), with Porolissum gaining later attention due to its defensive properties. The establishment of the military frontier took place in an exploratory manner: the survey of the land was followed by the construction of towers, mostly on high ground areas, used for signaling and communication, with the second most common type of building being small fortifications meant to fill in the gaps between important strategic places. Outside the Limes itself marching camps were constructed, some as far as 70 km like the one at Coștiui.

The stone phase of these structures started a few decades after the timber phase. A theory connects the second phase with the turmoil at the end of Trajan's rule, with Iazyges and Roxolani attacking the Roman fortifications of Dacia. Gaius Julius Quadratus Bassus, the Roman governor of Dacia appointed by Trajan, died in battle and Hadrian, after negotiating a peace with the Roxolani, appointed Marcius Turbo as temporary governor of Dacia and Pannonia Inferior in the spring of 118 CE. With Turbo's victory over the enemies of Rome in July 118 CE the Limes's structure came under Imperial scrutiny and a mandatum regarding administrative and military restructuring issued.

=== The zone outside the Limes ===
The Limes also represented the contact zone of the Roman Empire with the non-Roman population of the outer region, with whom trading relations were established. At Porolissum a customs office functioned, and evidence of intense trade is also given by the archaeological finds such as artefacts. The road which came from Potaissa continued outside the Roman Limes with one possible destination being Aquincum. A few settlements of free population with a mixed culture - mainly Dacian, but also Sarmatian and Germanic - were allowed to develop after 106 CE in the vicinity. Around the time of the Marcomannic Wars in the interaction zone which stretched from south of the Northern Carpathians, roughly the Upper Tisa Basin, to the Apuseni Mountains, artefacts of Przeworsk culture become frequent and more numerous settlements appeared, some just a few kilometers away from the fortifications. A particular type of artefacts represented by small bronze brooches were also found inside the Roman province, signaling perhaps the presence of female slave population resulted after the wars.

The Przeworsk culture presence subsided in the outer area around the time of the abandonment of the Limes giving way to a culture with Dacian characteristics and Roman influences known as Blazice-Bereg culture.

=== Exercitus Daciae Porolissensis ===
Following the reorganization mandated by Hadrian a single legion was permanently stationed in Dacia, at Apulum, until 168/169. Possibly connected to the wars with the Marcomanni, Legio V Macedonica returns to Dacia around this time and camps at Potaissa. The legion joined the garrison of the newly created Dacia Porolissensis province consisting of 3 alae and 12 auxilliares totalling an approximate 11,000 soldiers.

== Bibliography ==
- Defensive strategies and trans-border policies at the Lower Danube
- Alexandru V. Matei, Robert Gindele - Roman defensive system from north-western part of Dacia. Field researches at Supuru de Sus (Satu Mare County) and literature sources.
- Comuna Buciumi, important areal de convergenţă turistică
- About the tactics and fighting particularity of the auxiliary infantry in Roman Dacia
