= Poiana Vadului =

- Commune
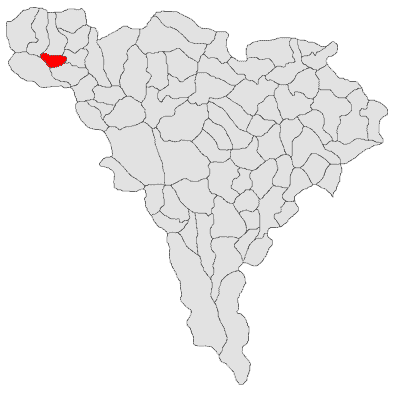
- Location in Alba County

- Location in Romania
- Coordinates: 46°24′N 22°53′E
- Country: Romania
- County: Alba

Government
  - Mayor (2020–2024): Beniamin Toader (PNL)
- Area: 69.05 km^{2} (26.66 sq mi)
- Elevation: 793 m (2,602 ft)
- Population (2021-12-01): 942
  - Density: 14/km^{2} (35/sq mi)
- Time zone: EET/EEST (UTC+2/+3)
- Postal code: 517545
- Area code: (+40) 02 58
- Vehicle reg.: AB
- Website: poianavadului.ro

Poiana Vadului (until 1968 Neagra; Hungarian: Feketevölgy) is a commune located in Alba County, Transylvania, Romania. It has a population of 942 as of 2021, and is composed of eleven villages: Costești, Duduieni, Făgetu de Jos, Făgetu de Sus, Hănășești, Lupăiești, Morcănești, Păștești, Petelei, Poiana Vadului, and Stănești.

The commune is located in the northwestern corner of the county, in the Bihor Mountains; it is a starting point for ascending the Cucurbăta Mare peak, which is, at 1,849 m (6,066 ft), the highest peak in the Apuseni Mountains range. Situated in the Țara Moților ethnogeographical region, Poiana Vadului lies at a distance of 19 km (12 mi) from Câmpeni and 98 km (61 mi) from the county seat, Alba Iulia.

Historical population
Year	Pop.	±%
2002	1,304	—
2011	1,139	−12.7%
2021	942	−17.3%
Source: Census data
