= Certiae (castra) =

- Castra of Romita, Castra of Brusturi; Cersie, Certie, Certia
- Location within Romania
- 47.1539°N 23.2160°E
- Location: Romita, Sălaj, Romania

History
- Founded: 2nd century AD
- Built: Trajan

Site notes
- Condition: Ruined

Certiae was a fort in the Roman province of Dacia. The ruins are located near the villages of Romita and Brusturi, and the fort is also called the Castra of Brusturi. It is likely that the castra was the first fortification built in the region, during the conquest of Dacia phase, and then, as the Limes developed, its central role was overtaken by Porolissum while the local defence moved to Largiana.

== See also ==
- List of castra
- Limes Porolissensis
