= Făgetu de Sus =

Făgetu de Sus may refer to several villages in Romania:

- Făgetu de Sus, a village in Poiana Vadului Commune, Alba County
- Făgetu de Sus, a village in Ghimeș-Făget Commune, Bacău County
