= Western Romanian Carpathians =

Western Carpathians
- Romanian: Carpații Occidentali
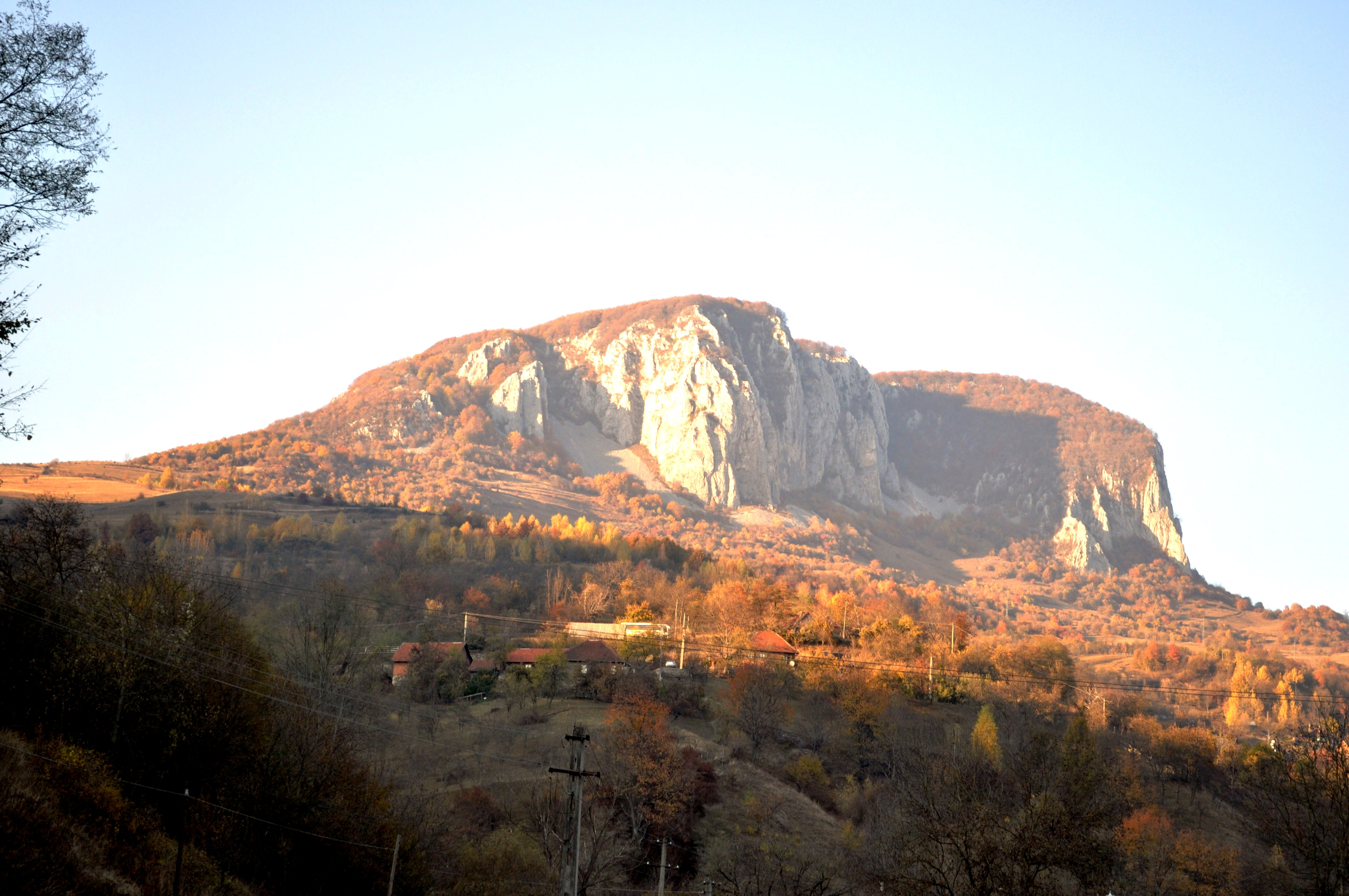
- Vulcan Mountain in Apuseni Mountains

Highest point
- Elevation: 1,849 m (6,066 ft)
- Coordinates: 46.5°N 23.0°E

Geography
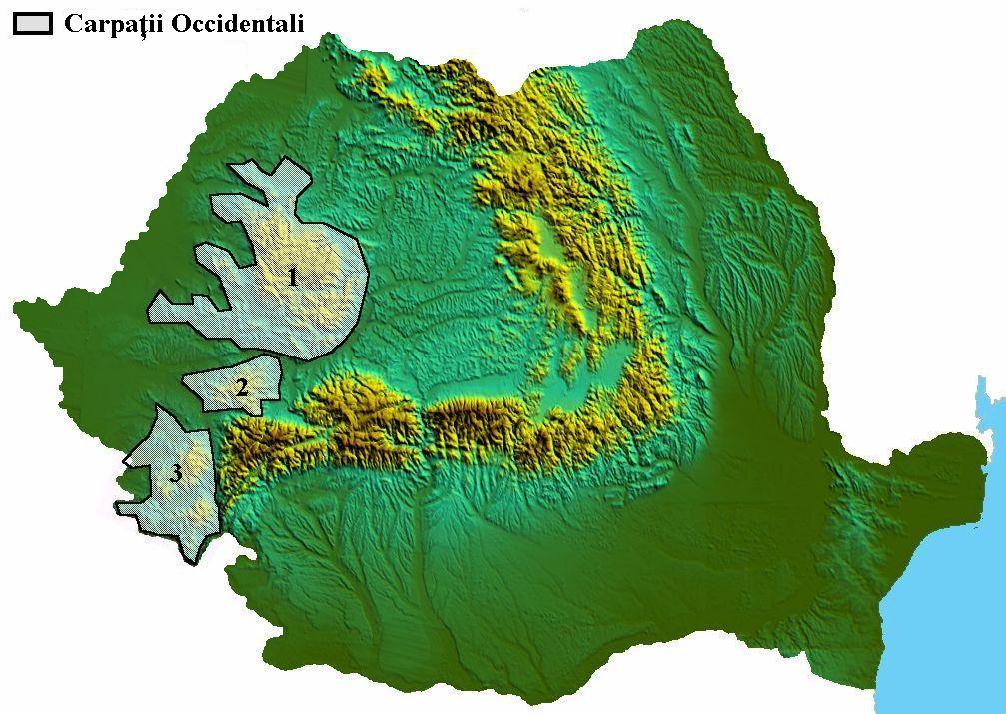
- The map shows the three groups in western Romania: the northern group of the Apuseni Mountains, the central group - Poiana Ruscă Mountains and the southern group - Banat Mountains
- Country: Romania
- Parent range: Carpathians

Geology
- Orogeny: Alpine orogeny

The Western Romanian Carpathians (Romanian: Carpații Occidentali Românești, Hungarian: Nyugati-Kárpátok), along with the Eastern Romanian Carpathians and the Southern Carpathians is one of the three main mountain ranges of Romania. Their name is given based on their geographical position, west, to the Transylvanian Plateau, which is simultaneously their eastern limits, respectively to the Timiș-Cerna Gap of the Banat Mountains, the southern group of the Western Carpathians.

The Western Carpathians are positioned between the rivers Danube, Barcău and Someș. They have a maximum elevation of 1849 m in the Bihor Mountains, Cucurbăta Mare Peak (Hungarian: Nagy-Bihar) - 1849 metres, also called Bihor Peak. Discontinuity is one of their basic characteristics. Geographical composition is varied, with a real "petrographic mosaic". (flysch, crystalline schists, limestones, igneous rocks, metamorphic rocks)

== Mountain ranges ==
From north to south, three major mountain groups can be identified, separated by different river valleys.

- Apuseni Mountains, north of Mureș
- Poiana Ruscă Mountains, south of Mureș
- Banat Mountains, the southwest corner of Romania, south of Timiș

There are 18 subgroups in total.

== See also ==
- Romanian Carpathians
