= Potaissa (castra) =

- Castra of Turda; Patavissa, Patabissa, Patauissa, Patruissa, Patrouissa, Patreuissa
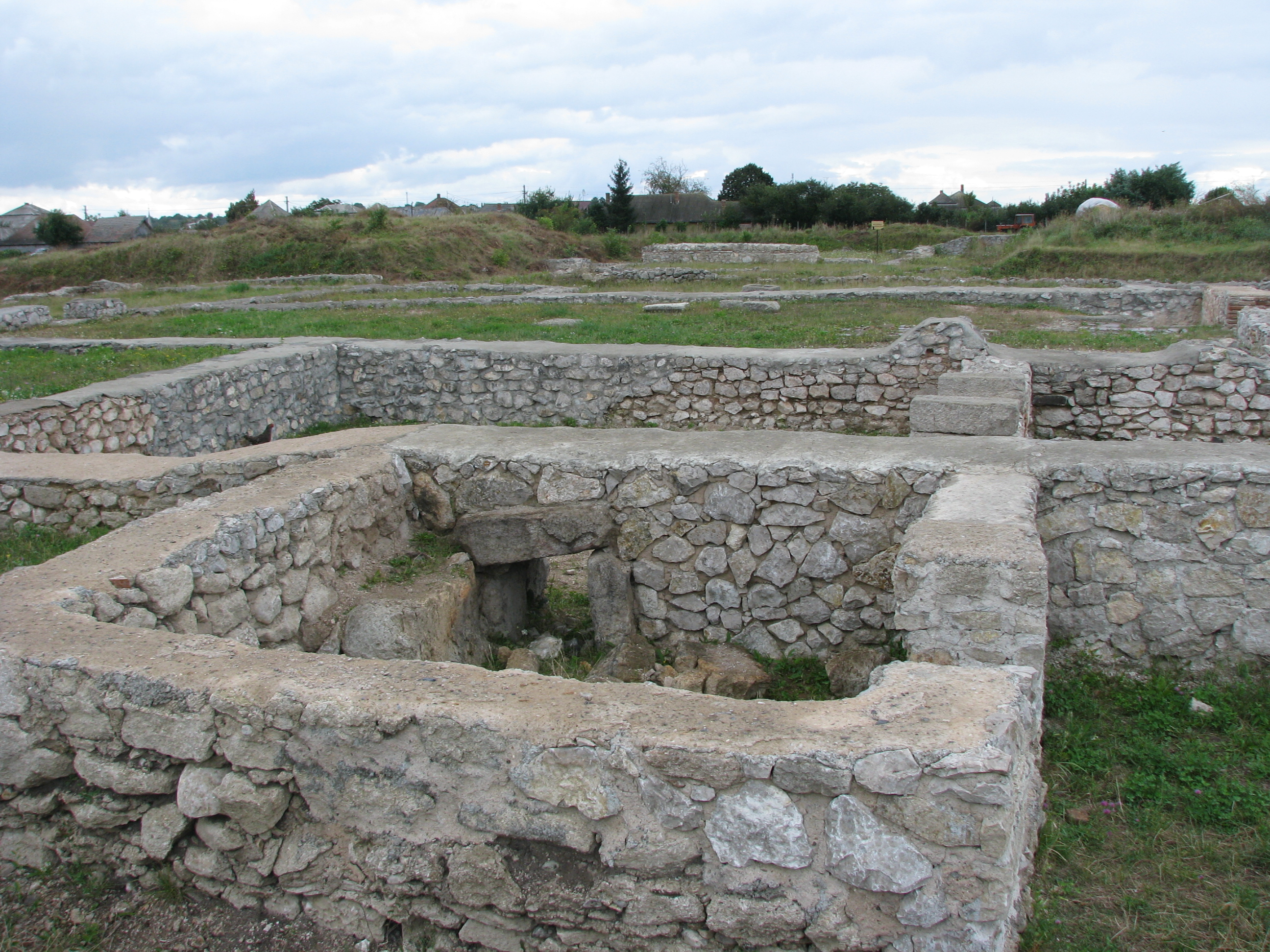

- Location within Romania
- Location: Fortress' Hill, Turda, Cluj, Romania

History
- Founded: 168
- Built: Marcus Aurelius
- Abandoned: c. 4th-5th century

Site notes
- Elevation: 369 m (1,211 ft)
- Excavation dates: 1950
- Condition: Ruined

Potaissa was a legionary fortress and later a city in the Roman province of Dacia, located in today's Turda, Romania.

It appears on the Tabula Peutingeriana (Segmentum VIII) as Patavissa between Salinae and Napoca.

Roman Dacia

== History ==
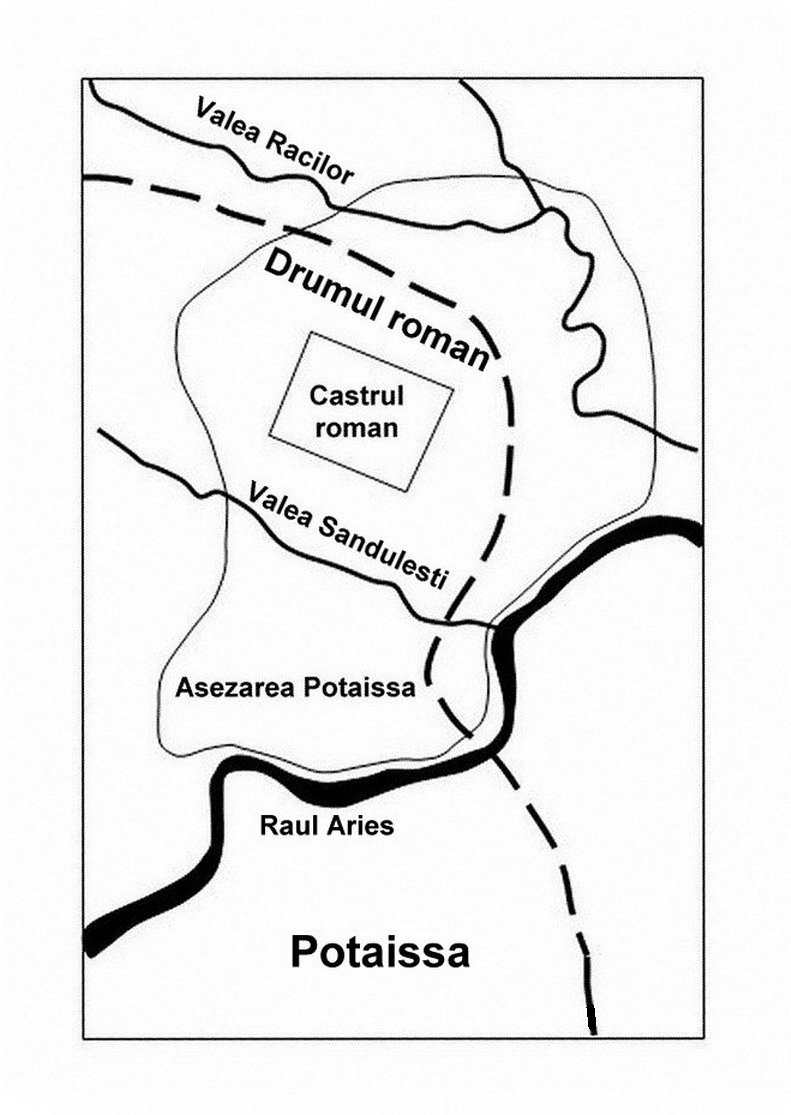
Location

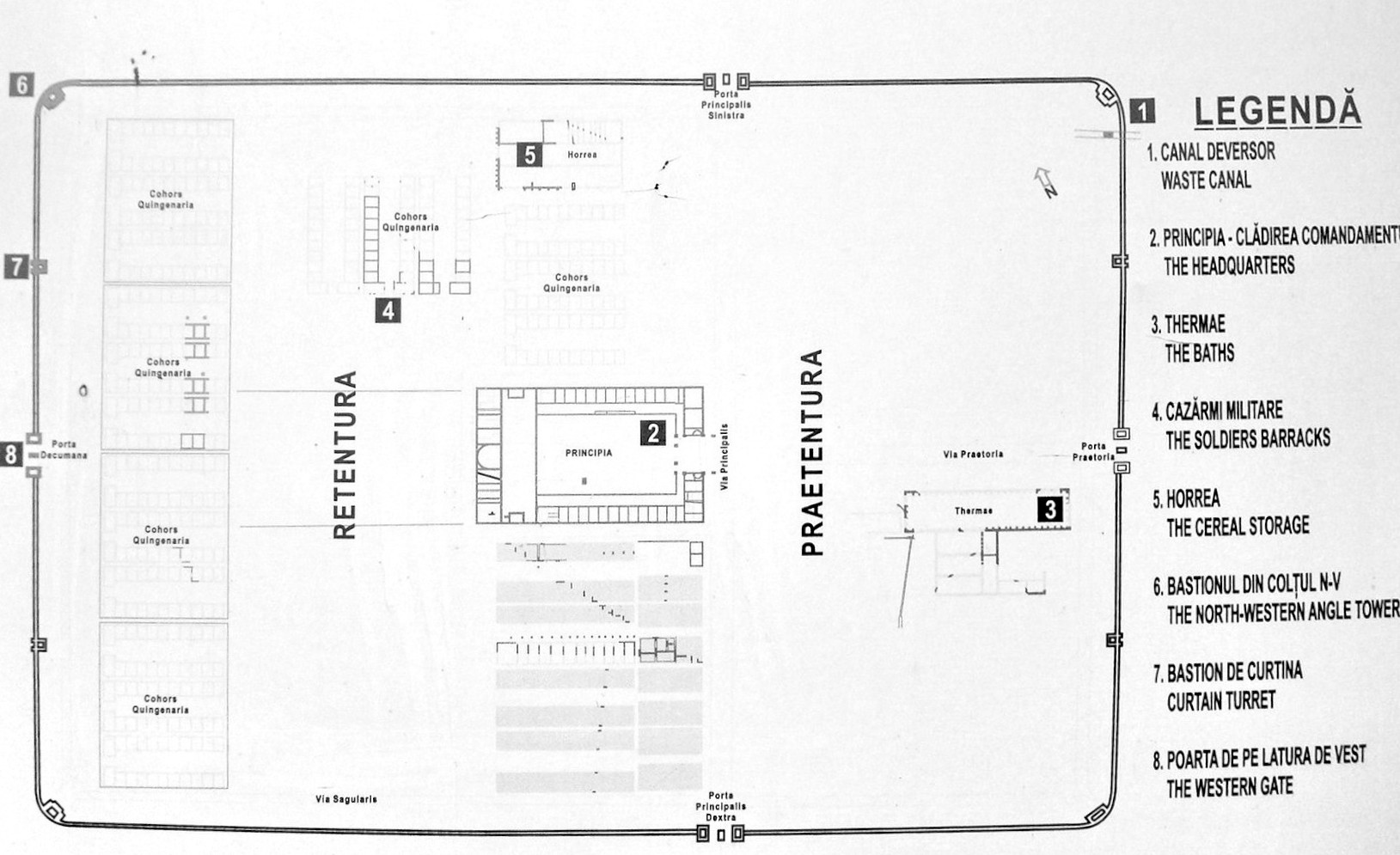
Potaissa plan

The Potaissa salt mines were worked in the area since prehistoric times.

The Dacians established a town that Ptolemy in his Geography calls Patreuissa, which is probably a corruption of Patavissa or Potaissa, the latter being more common.

It was conquered by the Romans between AD 101 and 106 in Trajan's Dacian Wars, together with parts of Decebal's Dacia. The Romans kept the name Potaissa.

The city became a municipium, then a colonia.

The start of the Marcomannic Wars and murder of the governor Calpurnius Proculus led Rome to send the Legio V Macedonica from Troesmis to Potaissa around 168 AD to strengthen the north-western defenses of Roman Dacia. They built their legionary fortress nearby on the "Cetate" Hill as their base

It was used until 274 after which the legion was moved by Aurelian to Oescus on his withdrawal from Dacia. Following this the urban life decayed and the territory ruralized. Post-Aurelian coins used between the fourth and the fifth century show a much reduced trade community. From the second half of the fifth century cultural traces of Gepid nature were found in the former Roman city territory.

== The site ==
The fortress occupies an area of 23.4 ha, belonging to the group of the medium-size legionary fortresses. The fort wall had a perimeter of almost 2 km and its construction needed circa 25000 m^{3} of stone from the quarry at Sanduleşti. In the four corners of the fortress were trapezoidal-shaped bastions, and along each side was a gate. Via principalis, which provides access to the porta principalis dextra and porta principalis sinistra, was about 10 m wide. The whole fortress area was judiciously used (the cereal warehouses/horrea, the soldier's barracks of cohorts quingenaria and milliaria, the access roads etc.) so as to ensure all the supplies for over 5000 soldiers of the legion. The most important building examined archaeologically is that of the headquarters (principia).

The thermal baths, with an area of over 2,000 m^{2}, are the biggest military thermae known in Dacia.

== Aqueducts ==
The spring supplying the fort with water is at "The Spring of the Romans" southwest of Copăceni village, on the right side of the Turda - Petreștii de Jos road. From here the water was led through an aqueduct about 5 km long to the fortress. A second aqueduct, starting from the same source, supplied water to the city of Potaissa also at a distance of about 5 km.

== Milestone ==
The name Potaissa is recorded on the Milliarium of Aiton milestone dating from 108 AD shortly after the Roman conquest of Dacia, and showing the construction of the road built by Cohors I Hispanorum miliaria from Potaissa to Napoca, by demand of the Emperor Trajan. It indicates the distance of 10,000 feet (3,000 m) to Potaissa.

The complete inscription is: "Imp(erator)/ Caesar Nerva/ Traianus Aug(ustus)/ Germ(anicus) Dacicus/ pontif(ex) maxim(us)/ (sic) pot(estate) XII co(n)s(ul) V/ imp(erator) VI p(ater) p(atriae) fecit/ per coh(ortem) I Fl(aviam) Vlp(iam)/ Hisp(anam) mil(liariam) c(ivium) R(omanorum) eq(uitatam)/ a Potaissa Napo/cam / m(ilia) p(assuum) X".

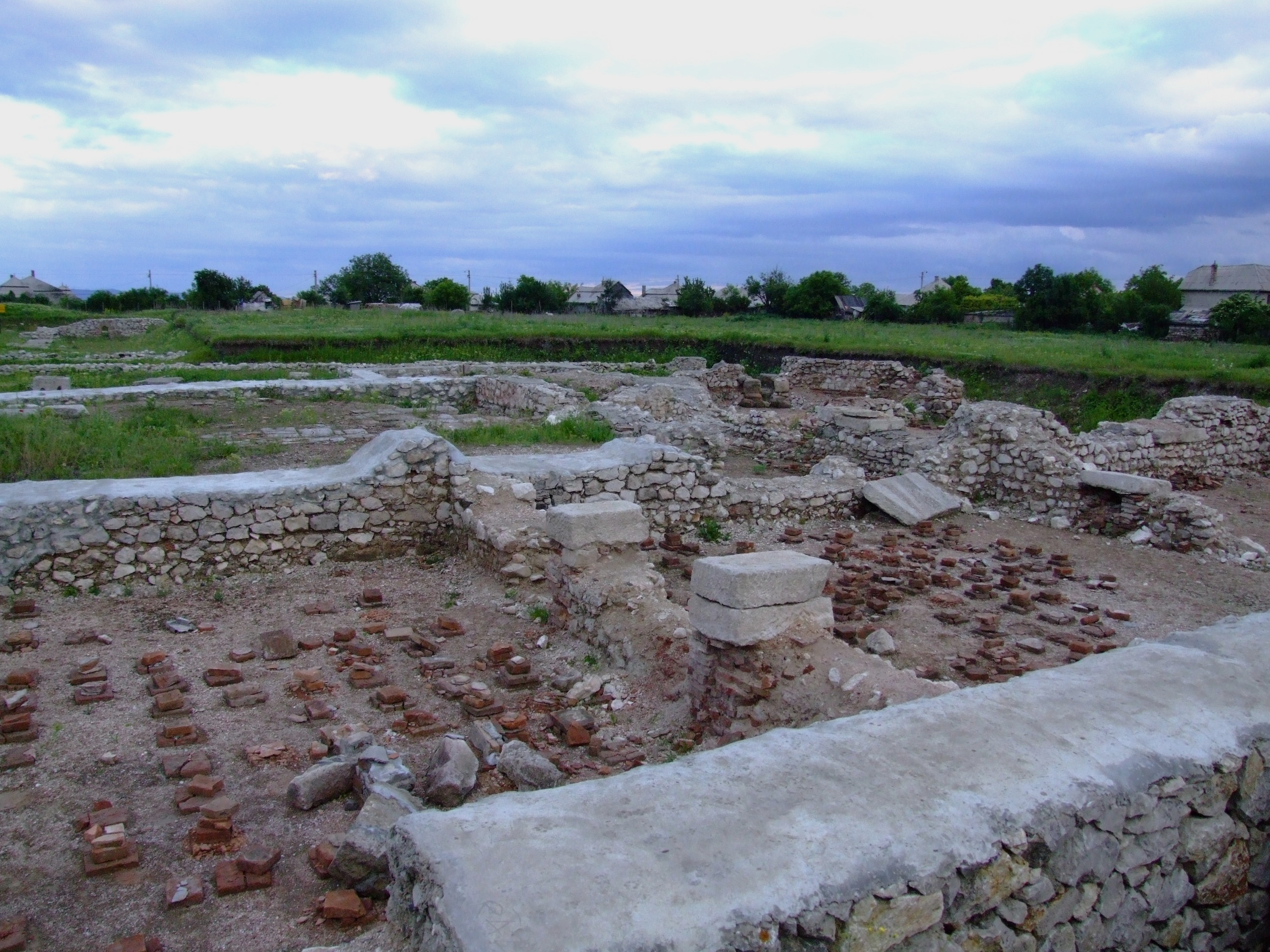
Thermal baths

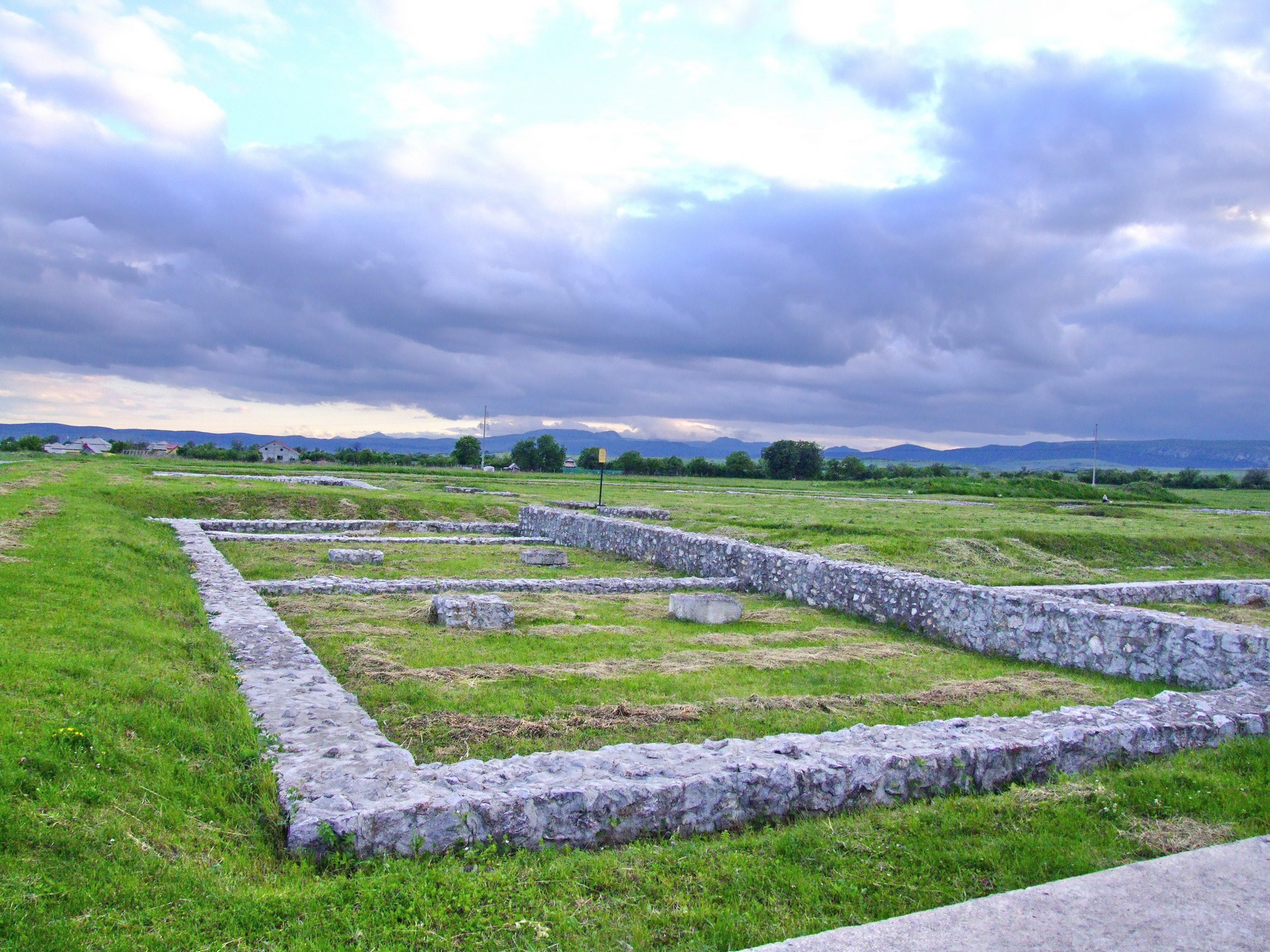

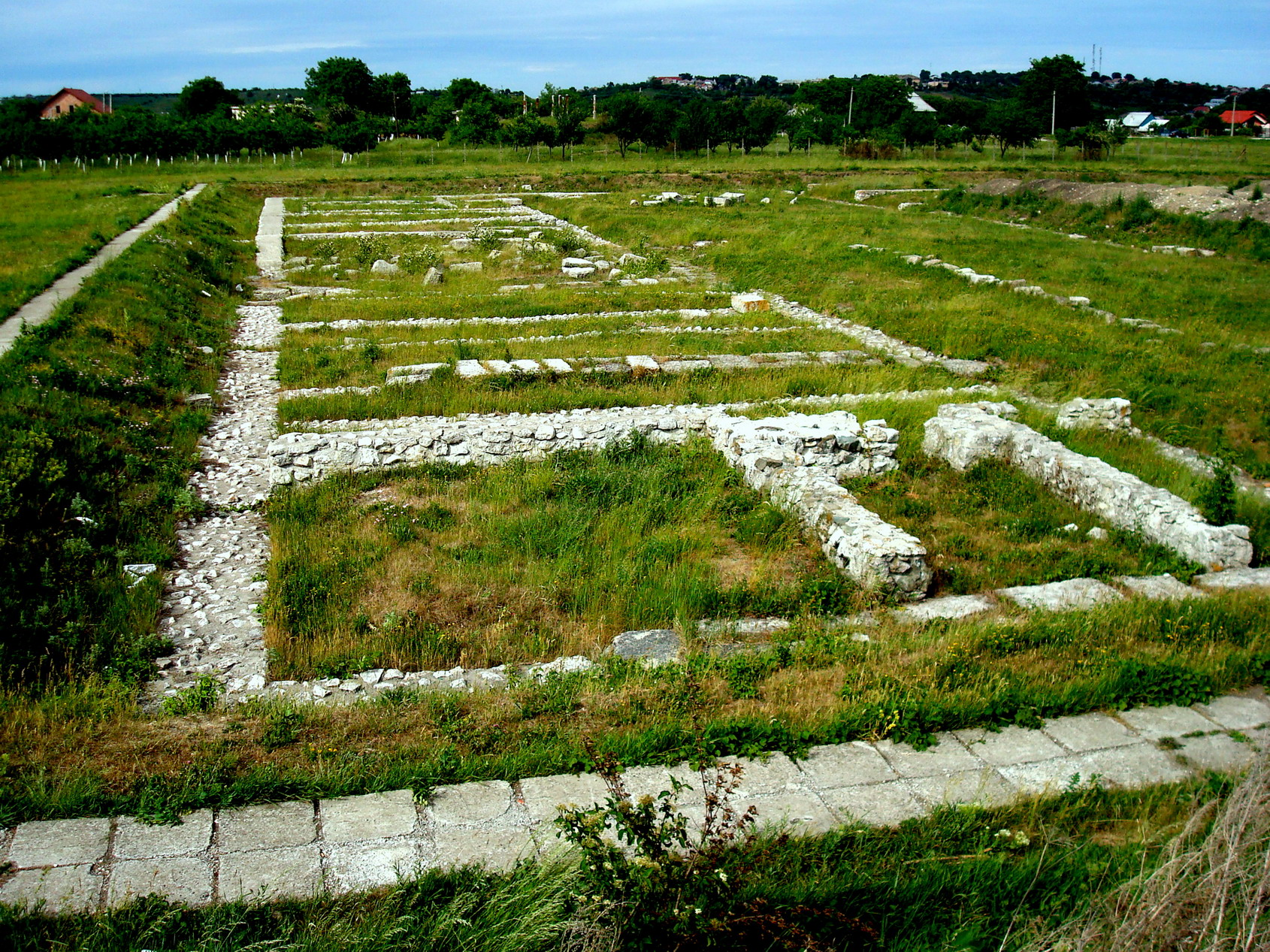

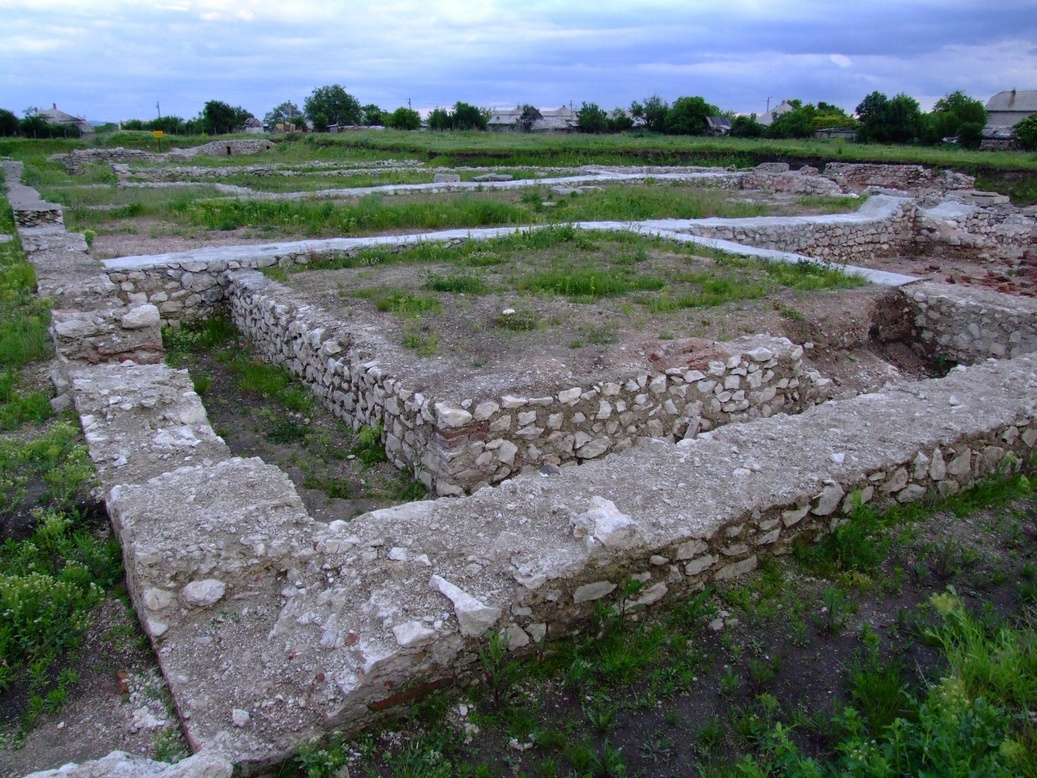
baths

== See also ==
- Porolissum
- Napoca (castra)
- Apulum (castra)
- List of castra in Dacia
- Roman Dacia
- History of Romania
