= Castra of Jac =

Fort in the Roman province of Dacia

- Castra of Creaca
- Location within Romania
- 47°10′N 23°11′E
- Location: Citera, Jac, Sălaj, Romania

History
- Founded: 2nd century AD
- Abandoned: 3rd century AD

Site notes
- Excavation dates: 1958; 2005 - 2010
- Archaeologists: Mihai Macrea; Doru Protase; Nicolae Gudea; Alexandru V. Matei; Horea Pop; Mircea Rusu
- Condition: Ruined

The Castra of Jac was a fort made of earth in the Roman province of Dacia. It was erected in the 2nd century AD. Not far from the fort, the remains of a previous fortification (built in the 1st century BC) and of a Roman watchtower were unearthed. The fort and the watchtower were abandoned in the 3rd century. Traces of the castra can be identified on Citera Hill in Jac (commune Creaca, Romania). The fort was manned by a Palmyran numerus with a detachment of horse-archers.

== See also ==
- List of castra
- Limes Porolissensis
