= Porolissum =

- *Castra of Moigrad; Castra of Mirșid; Porolisso, Porolisson, Paralisum, Paralissum
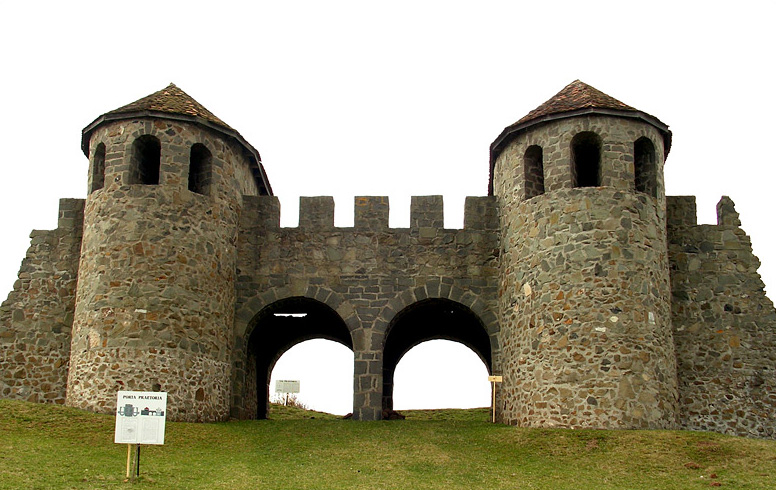
- The rebuilt Praetorian gate (Porta Praetoria)

- Location within Romania
- 47.1793°N 23.1573°E
- Location: Măgura Pomăt / Pomet, Moigrad-Porolissum, Sălaj, Transylvania, Romania

History
- Founded: c. 106 AD
- Built: Trajan

Site notes
- Elevation: 480 m (1,570 ft)
- Excavation dates: 1970 – 1977, 2009 – today
- Condition: Ruined, some parts are reconstructed

Porolissum was an ancient Roman city in Dacia. Established as a military fort in 106 during Trajan's Dacian Wars, the city quickly grew through trade with the natives and became the capital of the province Dacia Porolissensis in 124. It is one of the largest and best-preserved archaeological sites in modern-day Romania from the Roman Era. It is 8 km away from the modern city of Zalău, in Moigrad-Porolissum village, Mirsid Commune, Sălaj County.

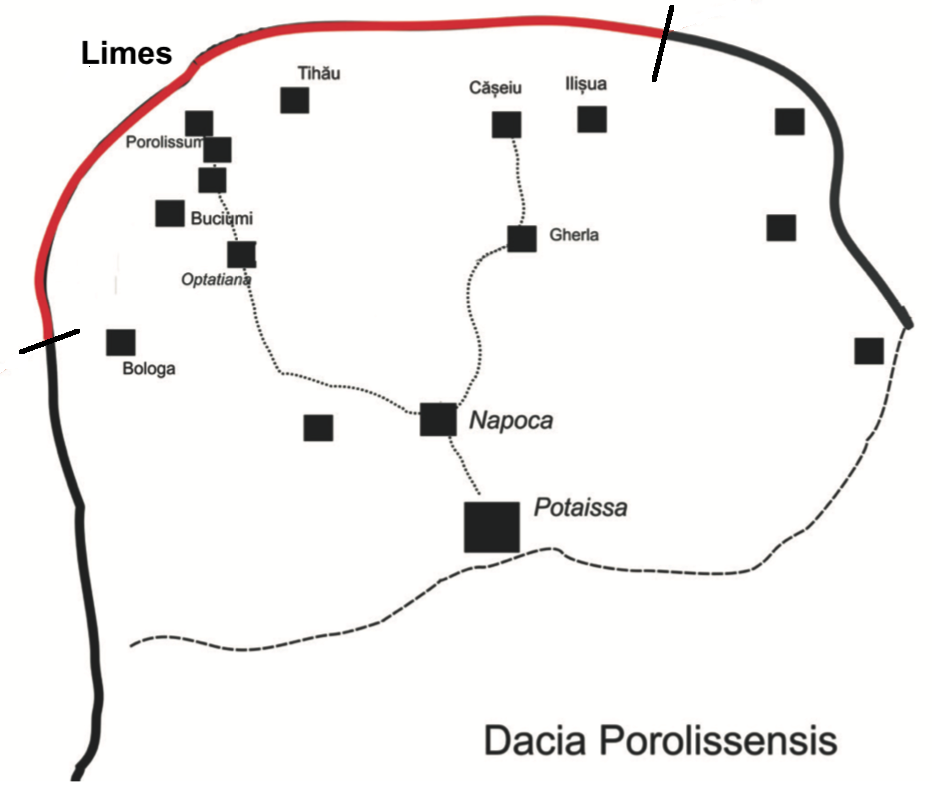
Dacia Porolissensis and Limes Porolissensis

== History ==
Plan of the fort

Two large Dacian hillforts, part of a group of fortifications in the area, were at Poguior hill and Măgura hill, near where the castra were later built.

In 106, at the beginning of his second war against the Dacians, Emperor Trajan established a military stronghold at the site to defend the main passageway through the Carpathian Mountains. It was the centre of defence of north-west Dacia and the Limes Porolissensis. The soldiers stationed here were granted Roman citizenship by Trajan.

The garrisons of Porolissum at different times were from various parts of the empire: Cohors I Brittonum milliaria Ulpia Torquata pia fidelis civium Romanorum (nominally 1000 strong), Cohors V Lingorum, Numerus Palmyrenorum Porolissensium Sagittariorum civium Romanorum (which later became Ala Palmirenorum Porolissensium) and Cohors I Palmirenorum Porolisensium.

The vicus (civilian settlement) developed on the south and west terraces of the fort. When Hadrian created the new province Dacia Porolissensis (named for the now sizable city) in 124, Porolissum became the administrative centre of the province. Under emperor Septimius Severus, the city was granted municipium status, allowing its leaders and merchants to act independently. It became an important centre of trade with the barbarians and was probably a customs station, as the main road that started at the Danube and linked the most important centres of Dacia passed to barbaricum with evidence that heavy wagons were carrying goods in and outside the province through here.

The garrison of Porolissum seems to have lived in peaceful coexistence with their immediate neighbours. At a distance of 5–15 km from the watchtowers connected to the city several villages were apparently founded on the surrounding hills. Archaeological culture findings indicate a mixture of free populations, Dacian-Germanic, possibly Buri. There are also some inscriptions mentioning city officials with Romano-Dacian names, indicating close cooperation on a political level.

== Excavations ==
Limited archaeological work at Porolissum began in the 19th century, but it was not until 1977 when Romanian archaeologists began larger-scale, systematic excavations. The excavations by a number of teams are ongoing and have uncovered remnants of both the military installations and the civilian city, including public baths, a customs house, a temple to Liber Pater, an amphitheatre, insula consisting of four buildings and a number of houses. The main gate (Porta Praetoria) of the stone fortress has been rebuilt. A joint American-Romanian team, the Porolissum Forum Project, excavated an area of the civilian settlement from 2004–2011; despite the name of the project, the team confirmed that while this area served a public function, it was not necessarily a forum.

From 2006 until 2011, another project, "Necropolis Porolissensis", was running focused on the cemetery of the municipium Porolissum, on the spot known as "Ursoies". From 2008 to 2011 a Romanian-German-Hungarian team was excavating an underground-building in the centre of the castle, probably a water cistern.

In 2015, archaeologists from Zalău County Museum unearthed a stone sarcophagus containing skeletal remains of a young person. The sarcophagus is unusual because it was not found in the cemetery, rather it was discovered by chance during restoration of another part of the ruins. The limestone lid has carvings that were common in Roman times, and it has a hole that suggests that the grave was robbed in antiquity.

== Structure and layout ==
=== The fort of Pomet hill ===
The first fort on Pomet hill is one of the largest camps (226 x 294 m) in Dacia first built with earth ramparts and rebuilt in stone during Hadrian-Antoninus Pius period. Inscriptions discovered at the gates testify to the rebuilding of the camp under Caracalla (r.198 to 217 AD), and to the hasty rebuilding again under Gallienus (253 to 268). The walls are 1.5 m thick and have two ditches.

The fort's principal gates had round-fronted towers.

=== The fort of Citera hill ===
700 m northeast on Citera hill is another smaller fort (67 x 101 m) also first built of earth and later rebuilt in stone. The gates have squared towers at every corner projecting from the interior wall with trapezoidal towers inside. There is an inner and outer ditch.

=== Amphitheatre ===
The amphitheatre, with 5000-5500 seats, was built as a wood structure during the reign of Hadrian. In 157 AD it was rebuilt in stone.

=== Sanctuary of Nemesis ===
Nemesis was the goddess of justice, fortune and destiny. It was believed that she influenced the fate of those who were frequently faced with death and danger, so she was worshipped especially by soldiers and gladiators. Thus, the goddess was closely linked to the world of amphitheatres. Places of worship dedicated to her are near amphitheatres or even embedded in the building. The sanctuary of Porolissum was built in the late 2nd century or in the beginning of the 3rd century AD. Probably it was also a place of worship of other deities which were linked in one way or another to amphitheatre activities, especially animal fighting (venatio), such as Liber Pater: god of vegetation and vines, or Silvanus: protector god of forests, pastures and wild animals.

== Post-Roman fate ==
Although the Romans withdrew from Dacia ca. 271 under Aurelian, and the monetary finds over the period between 265 and 325 are scarce the site was sporadically inhabited until late the 4th century, the inhabitants even trading with the Roman Empire. According to other studies the modifications from after 271 CE, such as walling of the space between columns in the interior of the forum and the addition of three water basins constructed with crude masonry, show that a thriving community continued to inhabit the site.

Early medieval tombs were discovered within the site, one with a coin from the time of Stephen III of Hungary.

== In popular culture ==
Porolissum is the primary setting of Harry Turtledove's science fiction novel Gunpowder Empire.

== Gallery ==
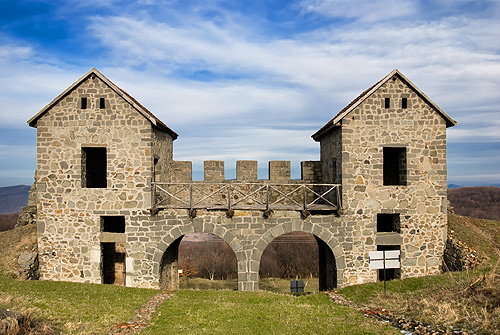
Porta Praetoria - view from inside

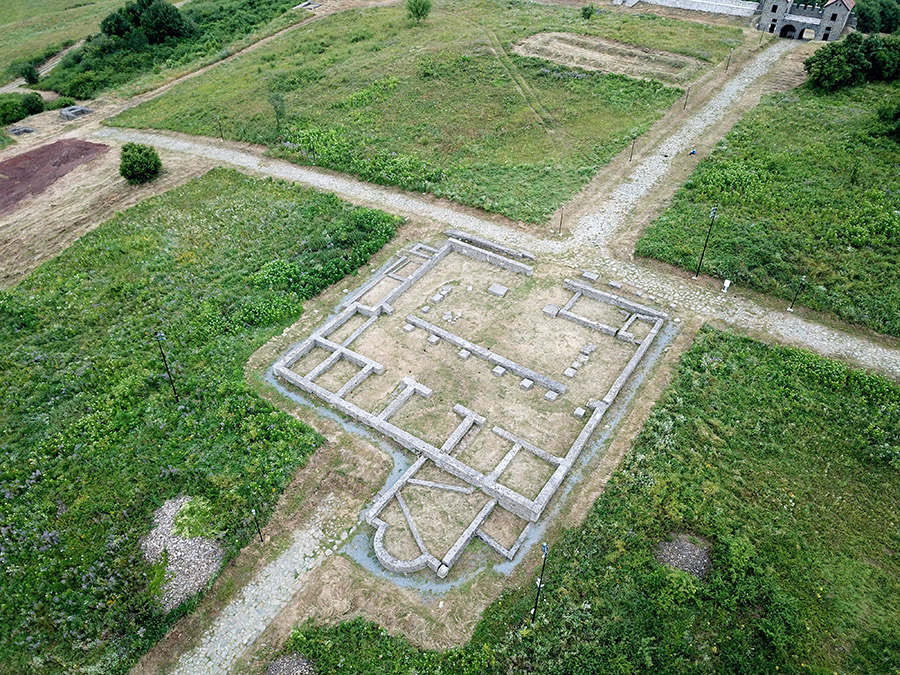
Principia

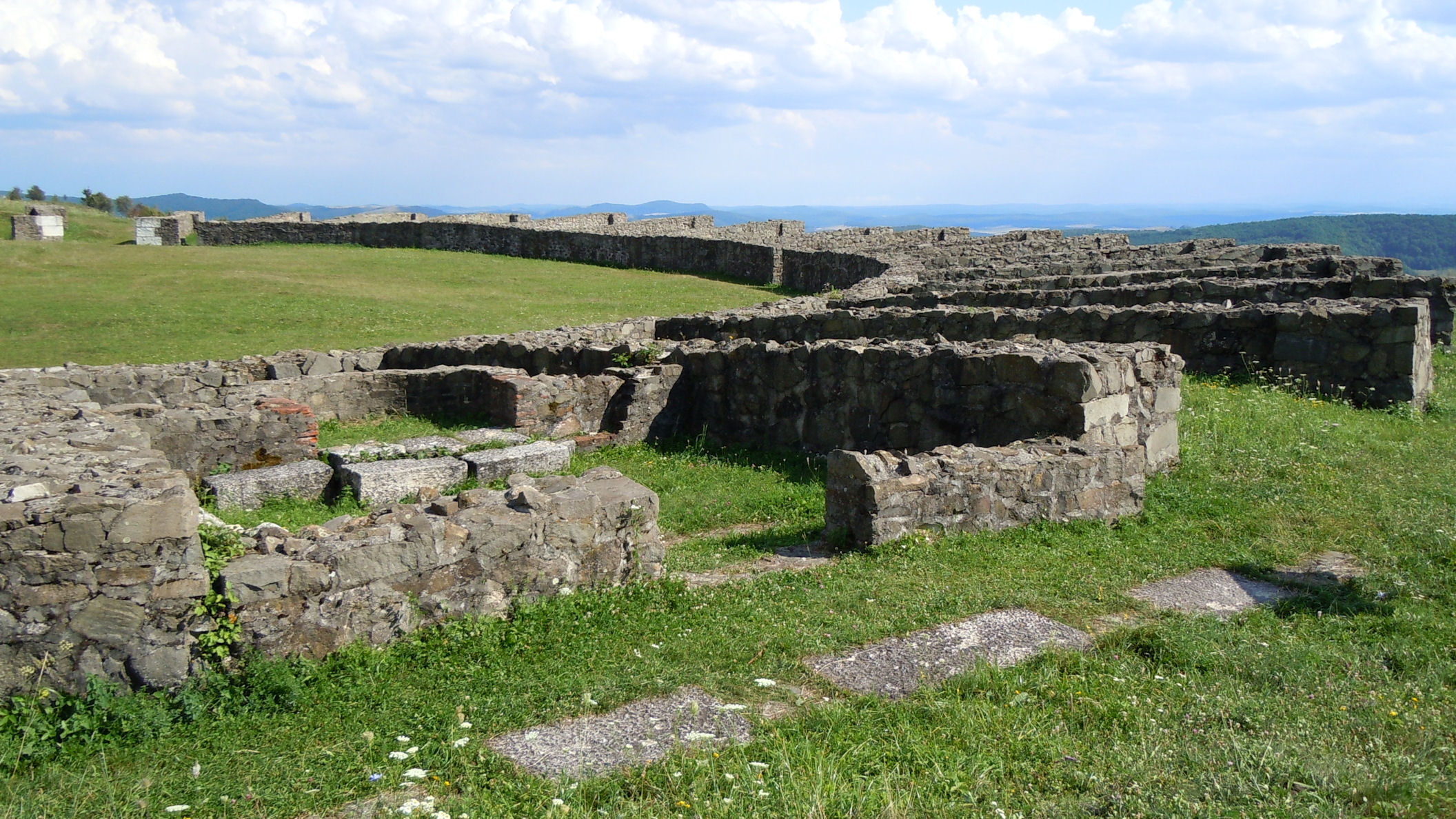
The amphitheatre viewed from the temple of Nemesis side

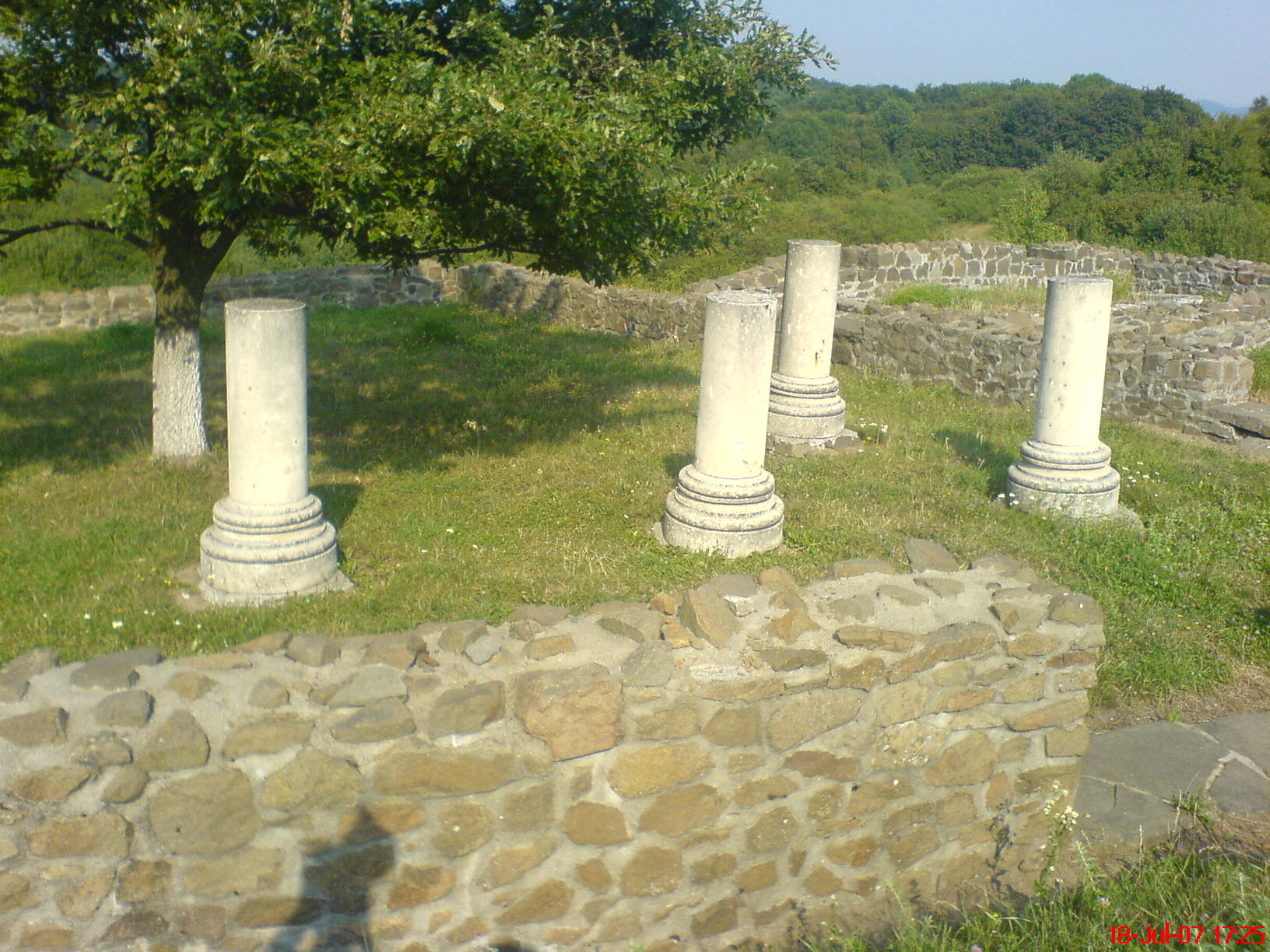
Temple of Jupiter Optimus Maximus Dolichenus

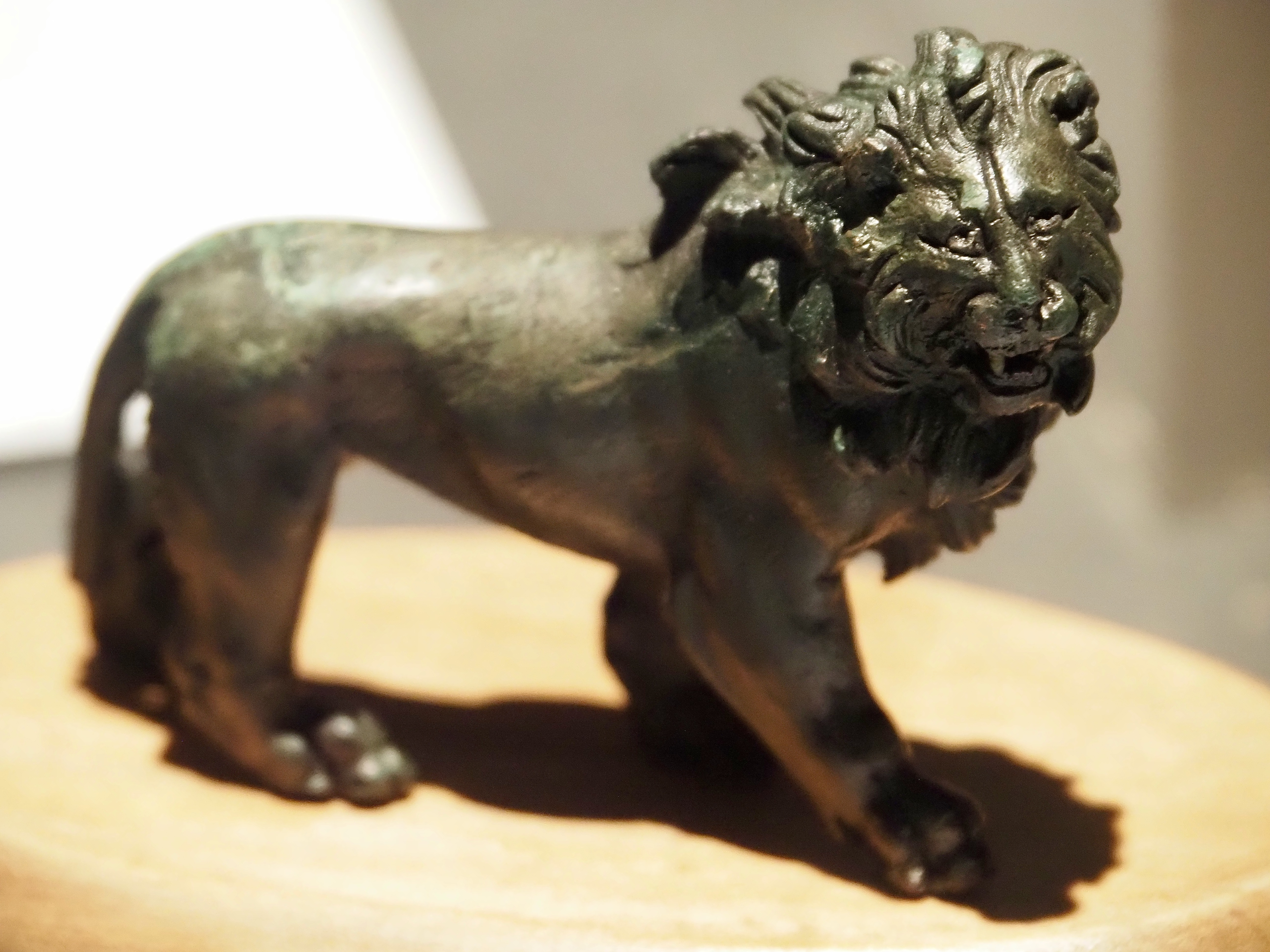
Bronze lion figurine found at the site

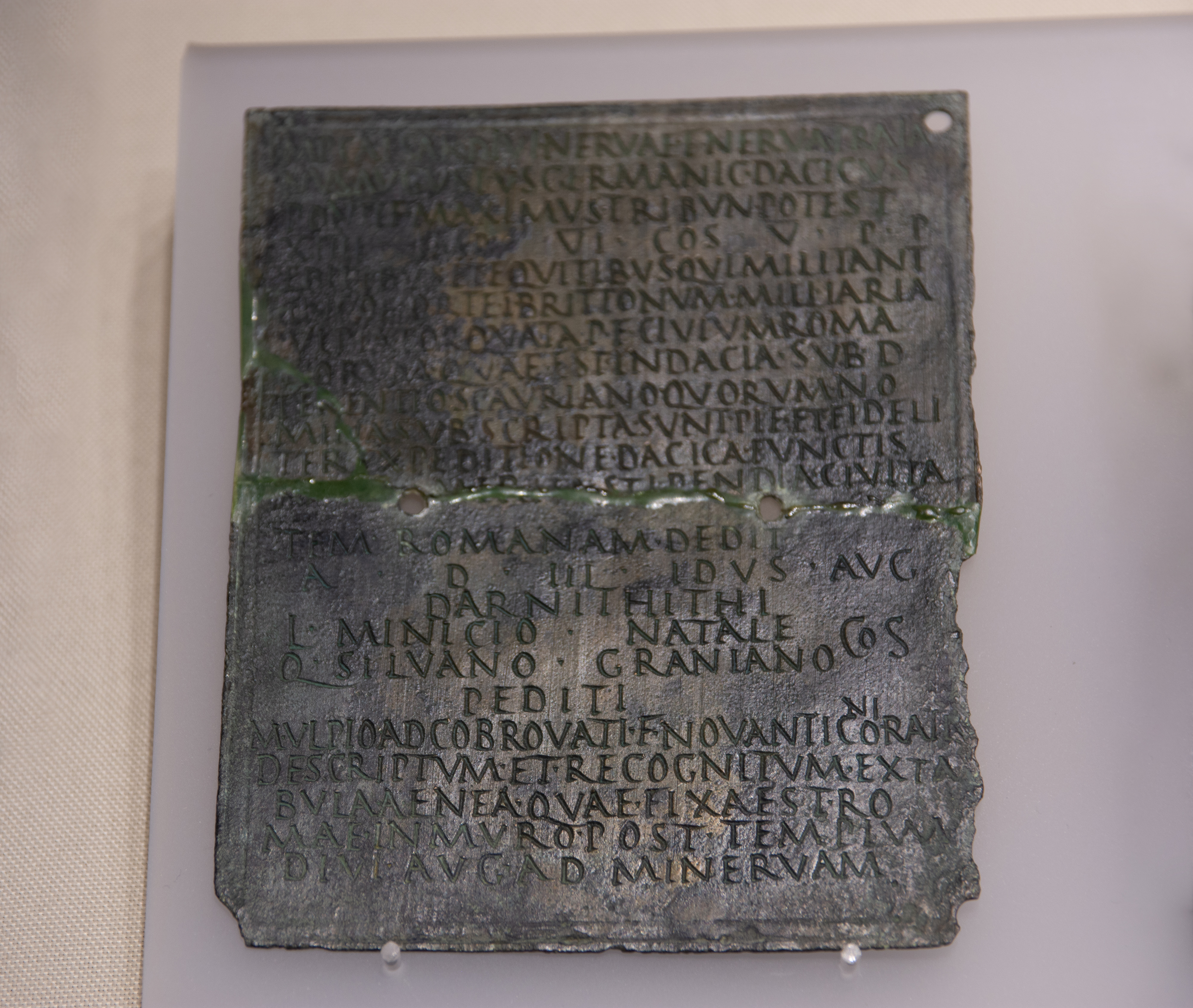
Military diploma

== See also ==
- Potaissa (castra)
- Napoca (castra)
- Apulum (castra)
- List of castra in Dacia
- Roman Dacia
- History of Romania

== Bibliography ==
- Princeton Encyclopedia of Classical Sites – Entry for Porolissum, retrieved March 29, 2006
- – an Overview of the Porolissum Forum Project archaeological excavations, retrieved April 4, 2017
- STRATEG. Strategii defensive şi politici transfrontaliere. Integrarea spaţiului Dunării de Jos în civilizaţia romană
- Romanian-German-Hungarian excavation inside the castle
- Complexul arheologic Porolissum
- Porolissum.org – an Overview of the archaeological excavations, retrieved March 29, 2006
