= Apuseni Mountains =

Mountains in Romania

Coordinates: 46°30′N 23°00′E

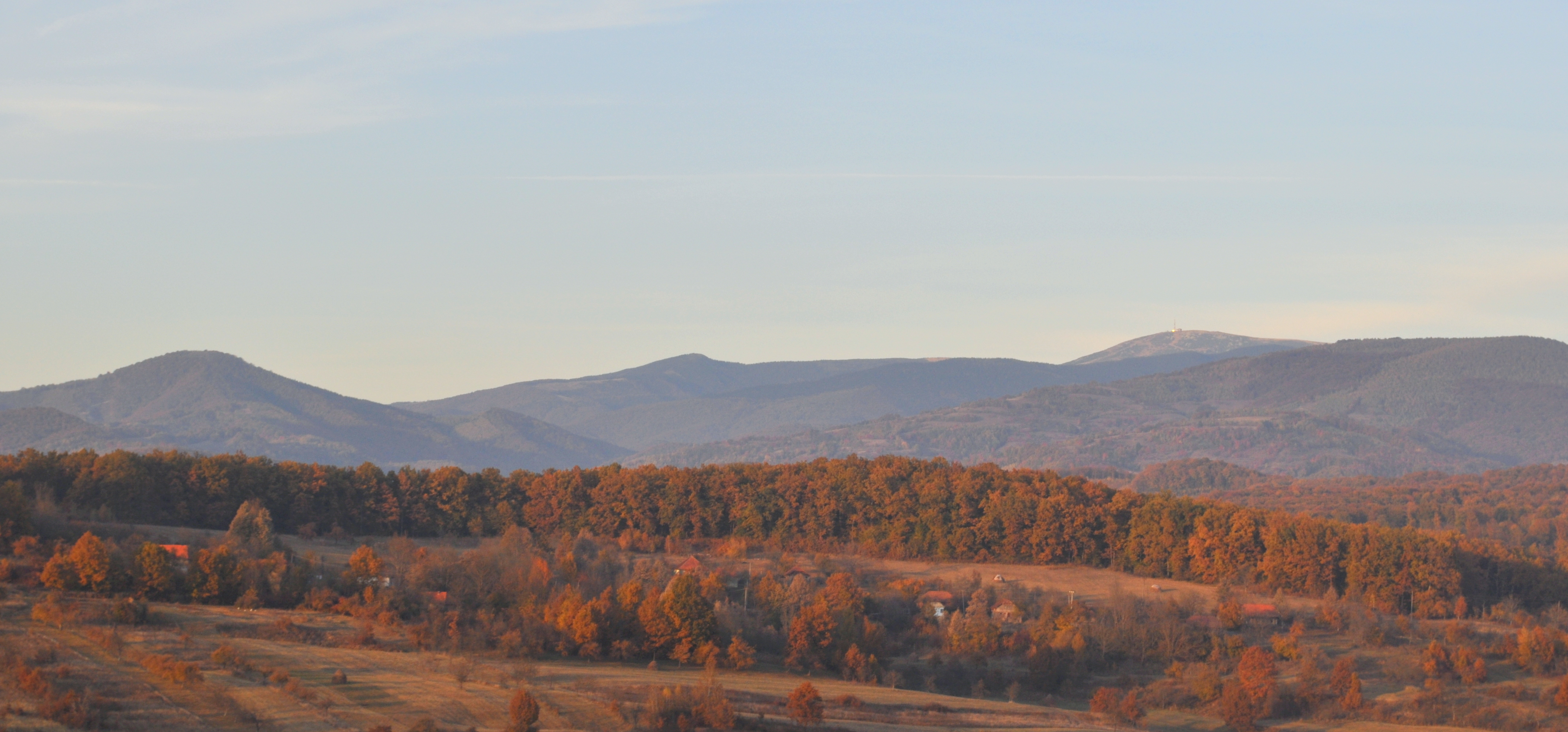
The main peaks of the Apuseni Mountains, with Bihorul on the right

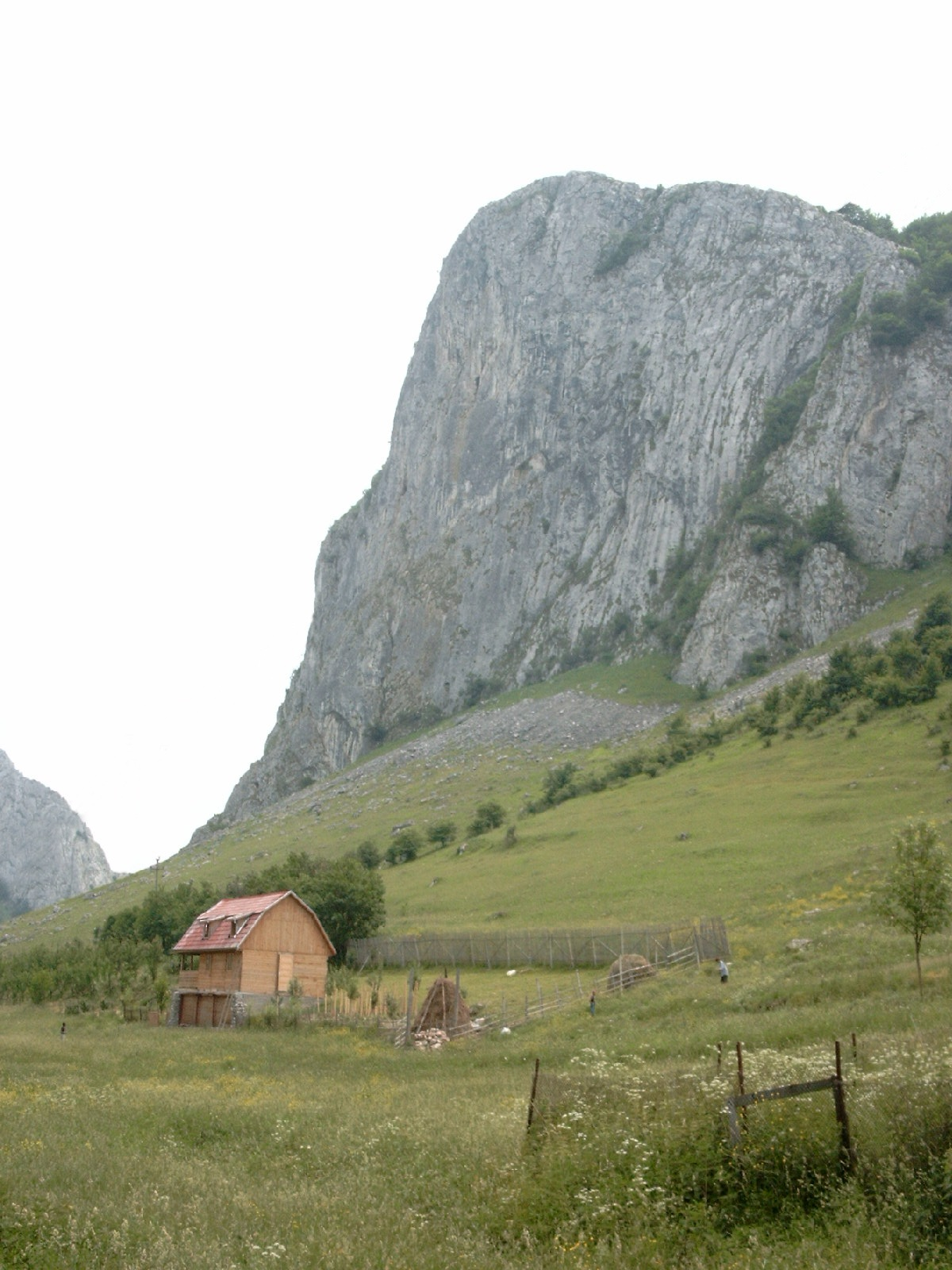
Trascău Mountains

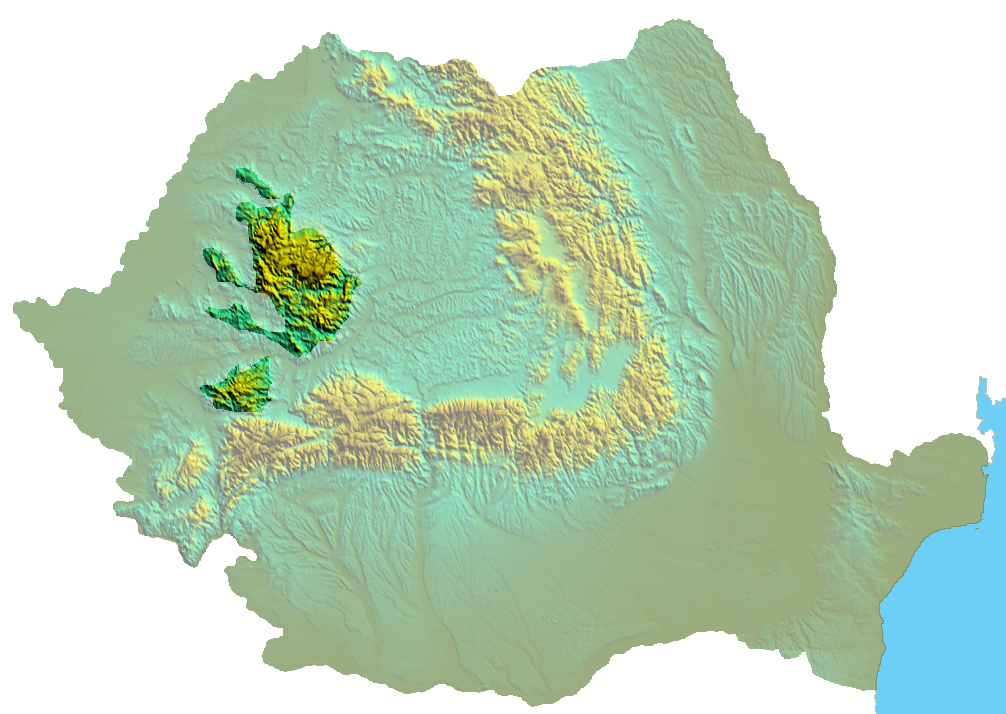
The Transylvanian Western Carpathians (Apuseni Mountains – the top ones)

The Apuseni Mountains (Romanian: Munții Apuseni, "Western Mountains"; Hungarian: Erdélyi-középhegység, "Transylvanian Mountains") are a mountain range in Transylvania, Romania, which belongs to the Western Romanian Carpathians. The highest peak is the Bihor Peak at 1,849 metres (6,066 ft). The Apuseni Mountains have about 400 caves.

== Geography ==
The Apuseni Mountains do not present an uninterrupted chain of mountains, but possess many low and easy passes towards the Crișana and the Pannonian Plain. Going from south to north the principal groups are: the Munții Metaliferi ("Ore Mountains") with the basaltic masses of the Detunata (1,148 metres (3,766 ft)) near Abrud; the Bihor Mountains, with numerous caverns, with the highest peak the Bihorul (1,849 metres (6,066 ft)); to the east of this group are the Muntele Mare (highest peak 1,820 metres (5,970 ft)), to the southwest of Cluj-Napoca; the northernmost chain is the Seș and Meseș Mountains.

The paleogeographic evolution of this mountainous area is closely linked to the evolution of the Western Carpathians and, in general, to the evolution of the entire Carpathian chain. The crystalline schists began to separate as early as the Precambrian period, becoming much more clearly defined in the Silurian period as a result of the Caledonian orogeny and, especially, in the Carboniferous period as a result of the Hercynian movements that affected the entire Carpathian chain and the mountains of Central Europe as far as Northern Dobrogea. From the Carboniferous period to the end of the Mesozoic era, the Carpathians were subjected to successive orogenic movements, volcanic and metamorphic processes with implications for natural deposits. The uplift of this area, as well as of the Carpathians, occurred in the Cretaceous period (Mesozoic) as a result of Alpine orogenesis, accompanied by subsidence movements, forming a series of depressions (Gurahonț, Brad), which functioned as lake areas where Carpathian rivers deposited sediments. After the Cretaceous period, the Apuseni Mountains underwent modeling processes, forming erosion platforms with lower altitudes than those in the Southern Carpathians (Borăscu - 2000 m; Râu-Șes- 1200 m - 1600 m; Gornovița or Predealului- 1000 m), due to the less spectacular elevation of the Western Carpathians compared to the Southern Carpathians. During the Paleogene period, numerous marine transgressions and regressions took place in the depression basins, as well as the consolidation of the Carpathian orogen. Volcanic activity in the second half of the Neogene period formed the Metaliferi Mountains.

The Apuseni Mountains reached their final elevation at the beginning of the Quaternary period. During this period, the waters receded from the depressions, forming the hydrographic network. Also during the Quaternary period, plant species began to differentiate according to altitude and the first humans appeared. They played an active role in shaping the geographical environment.

== Climate ==
The climate is temperate-continental with transitional nuances and oceanic influences. The average annual temperature is between 6 and 10°C, with precipitation of 700-1000 mm/year.

== Fauna and vegetation ==
The vegetation consists of deciduous and coniferous forests (above 1300 m). The fauna is very diverse, with species such as red foxes, grey wolves, martens, red deer, roe deer, squirrels, and brown bears. The Natural Park, which shares its name with the mountains, is home to a total of 45 species of mammals. This area is home to a variety of birds, including western capercaillie, lesser-spotted eagles, golden eagles, woodpeckers and many more.

=== Boundaries ===
- To the north: the Barcău River.
- To the south: the Mureș River.
- To the east: the Transylvanian Plateau.
- To the west: the Crișana plains.

=== Subdivisions ===
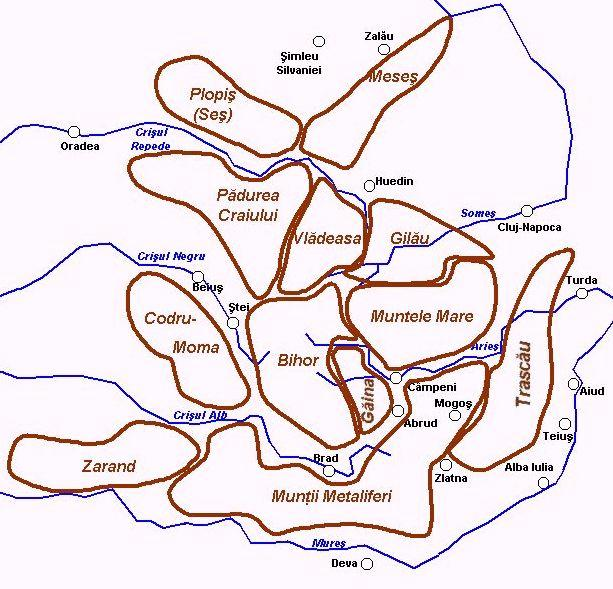

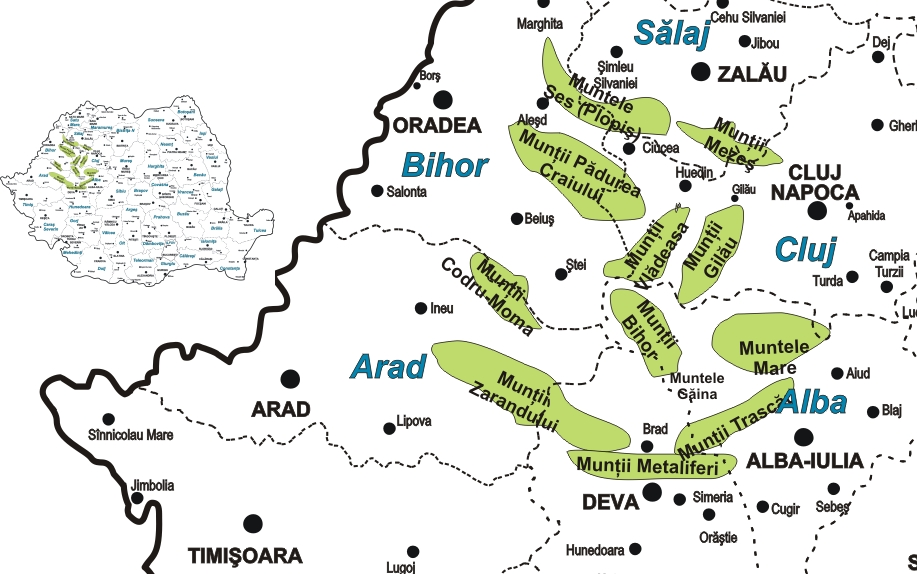

- Criș Mountains (Munţii Crișului, Hungarian: Körös-menti hegyvidék) :
  - Criș Hills (Dealurile Crișene, Hungarian: Körös-menti dombság), including the Beiuș Depression (Depresiunea Beiuș, Hungarian: Belényesi-medence) and the Vad Depression (Depresiunea Vad, Hungarian: Révi-medence)
  - Pădurea Craiului Mountains (literally:Forest of the King, Hungarian: Királyerdő-hegység)
  - Codru-Moma Mountains (Munții Codru-Moma, Hungarian: Béli-hegység)
- Seș-Meseș Mountains (Munții Seș-Meseșului):
  - Meseș Mountains (Munții Meseșului, Hungarian: Meszes-hegység)
  - Seș Mountains (Muntele Seș, Hungarian: Réz-hegység, also Plopiș)
  - Șimleu Depression (Depresiunea Șimleu Silvanei, Hungarian: Szilágysomlyói-medence), often considered part of the Transylvanian Basin-Podişul Someşan
  - Șimleu Mountains (Munții Șimleu, Hungarian: Szilágysági-dombvidék), often considered part of the Transylvanian Basin-Podişul Someşan
- Bihor Massif (Masivul Bihor, Hungarian: Bihari-havasok):
  - Bihor Mountains (Munții Bihorului, Hungarian: Bihar-hegység)
  - Vlădeasa Mountains (Munții Vlădeasa, Hungarian: Vlegyásza-hegység)
  - Muntele Mare Mountains (literally: Big Mountain), (Munții Muntele Mare, Hungarian: Öreghavas)
  - Gilău Mountains (Munții Gilăului, Hungarian: Gyalui-havasok)
- Mureș Mountains (Munții Mureșului, Hungarian: Marosmenti-hegyvidék):
  - Zarand Mountains (Munții Zarandului, Hungarian: Zarándi-hegység)
  - Metalliferous Mountains (Munții Metaliferi, Hungarian: Erdélyi-érchegység)
  - Trascău Mountains (Munții Trascăului, Hungarian: Torockói-hegység)

== Gallery ==
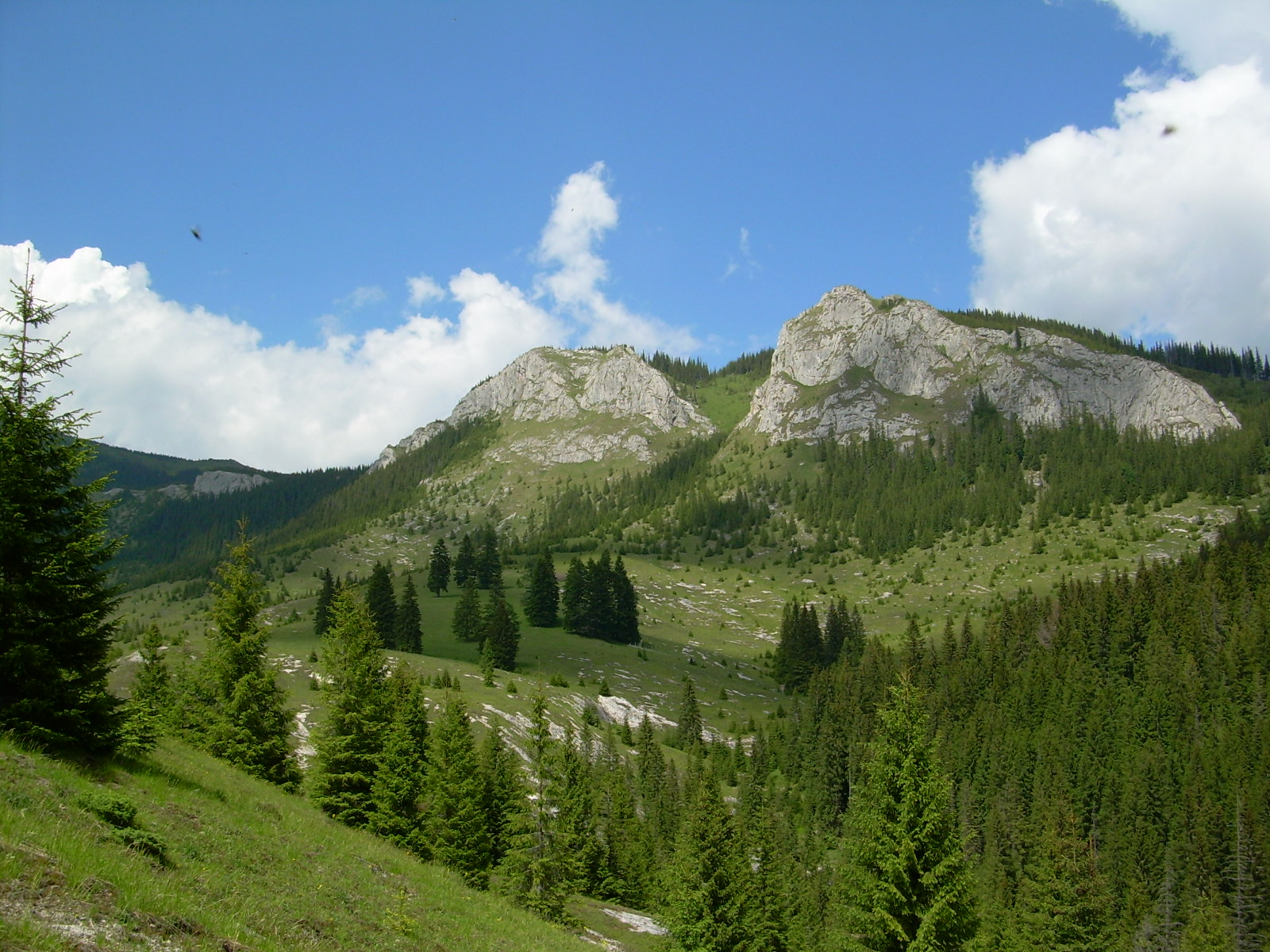
Vlădeasa

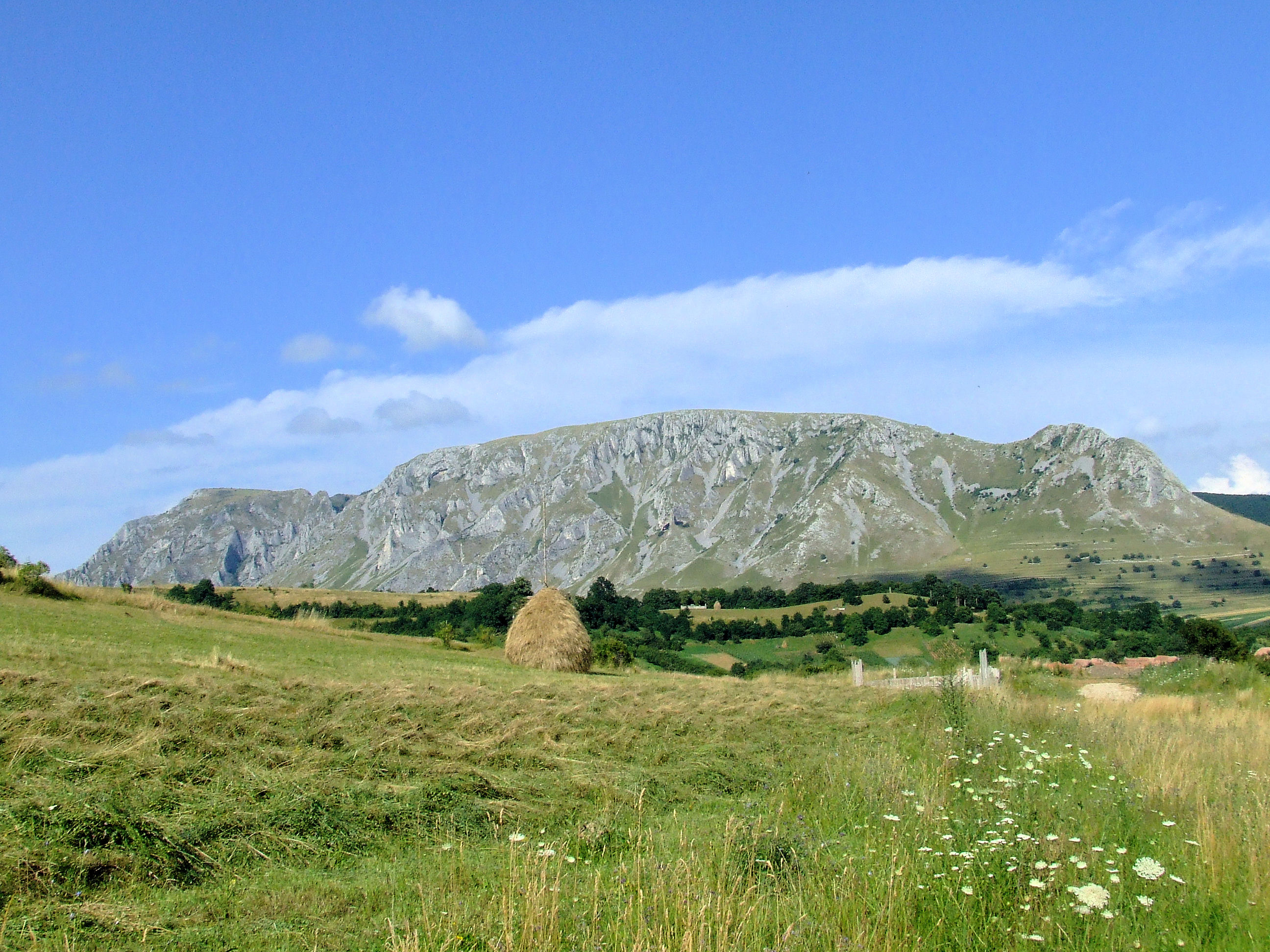
Piatra Secuiului

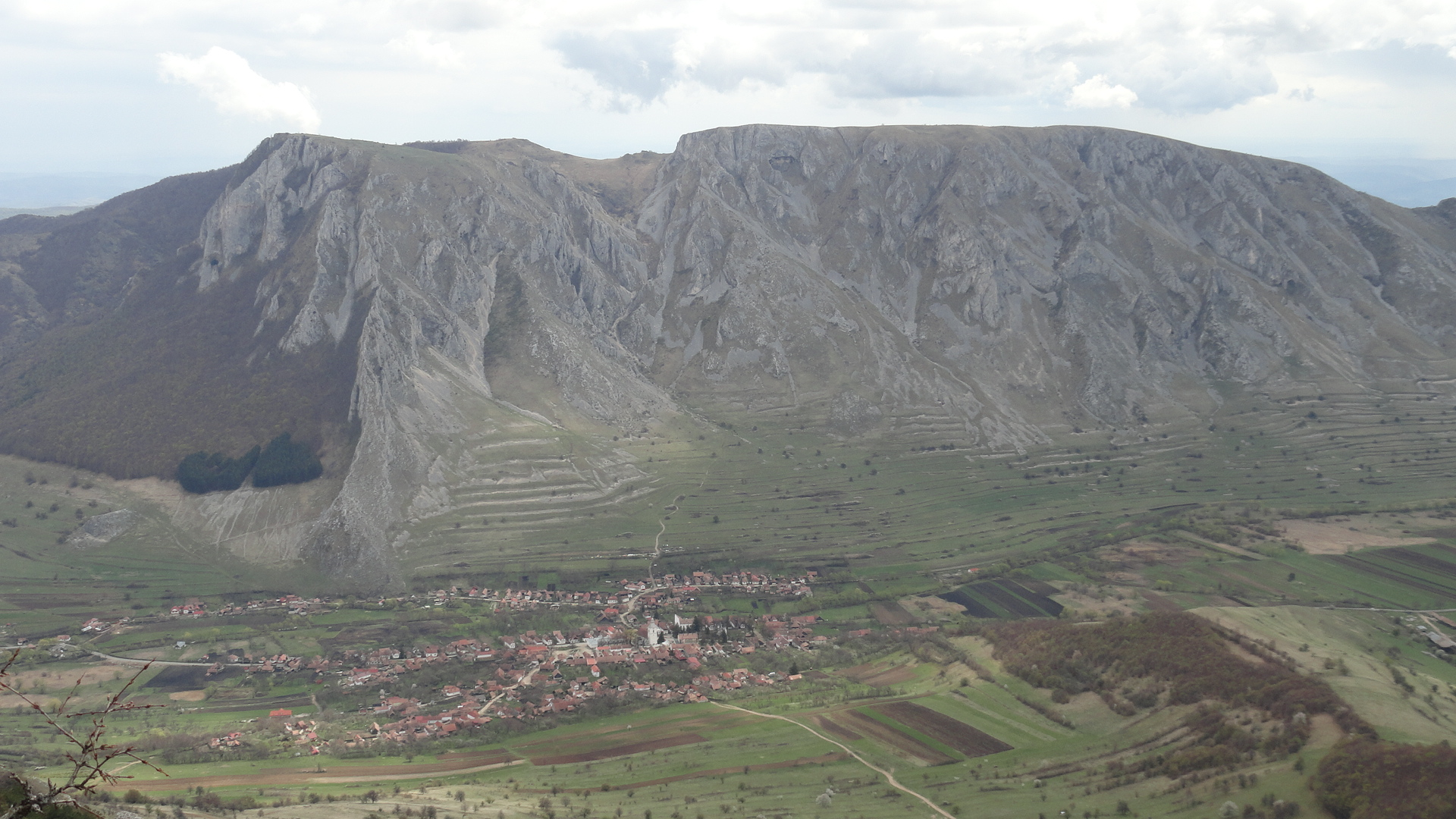

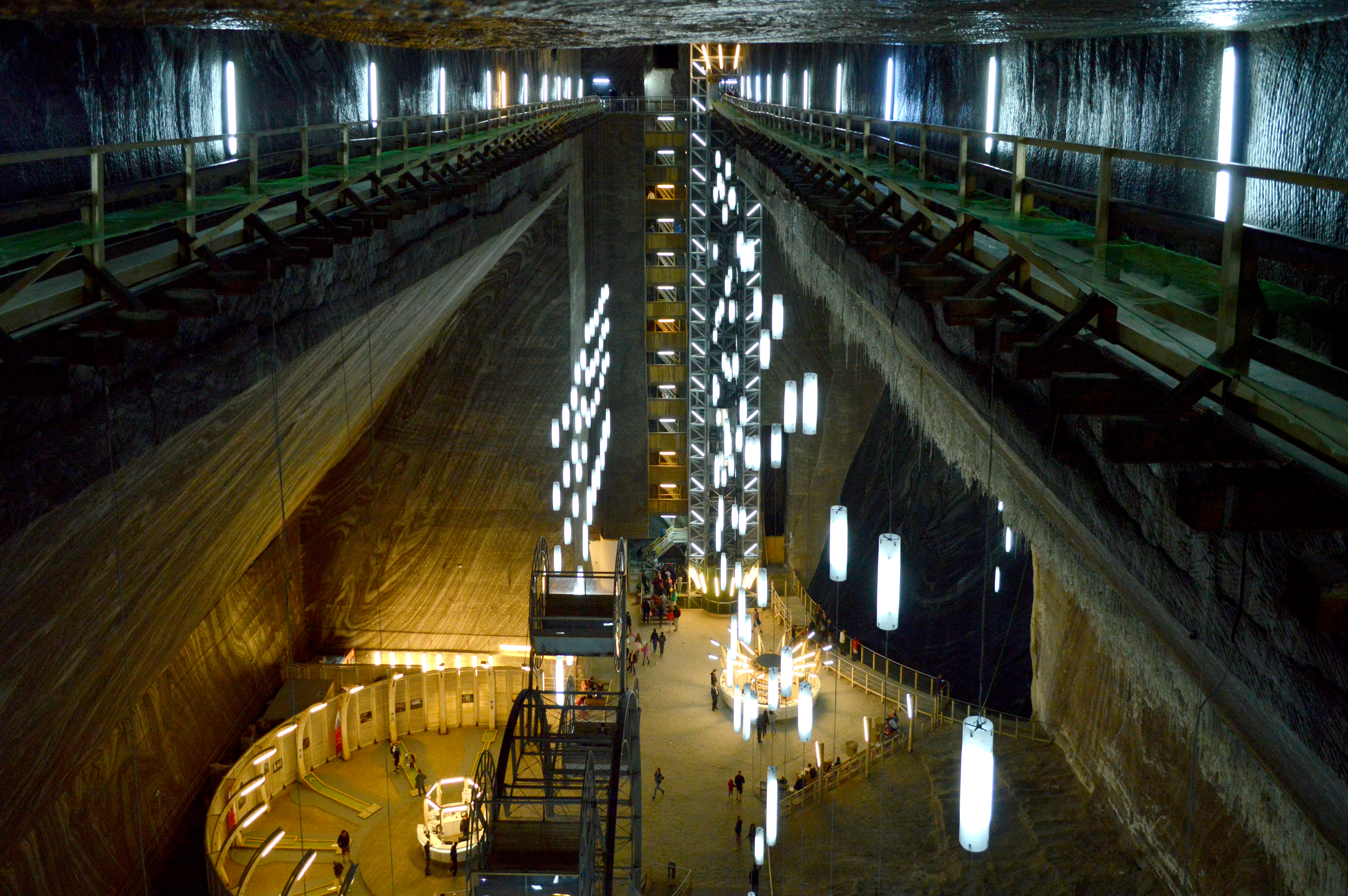
Salina Turda

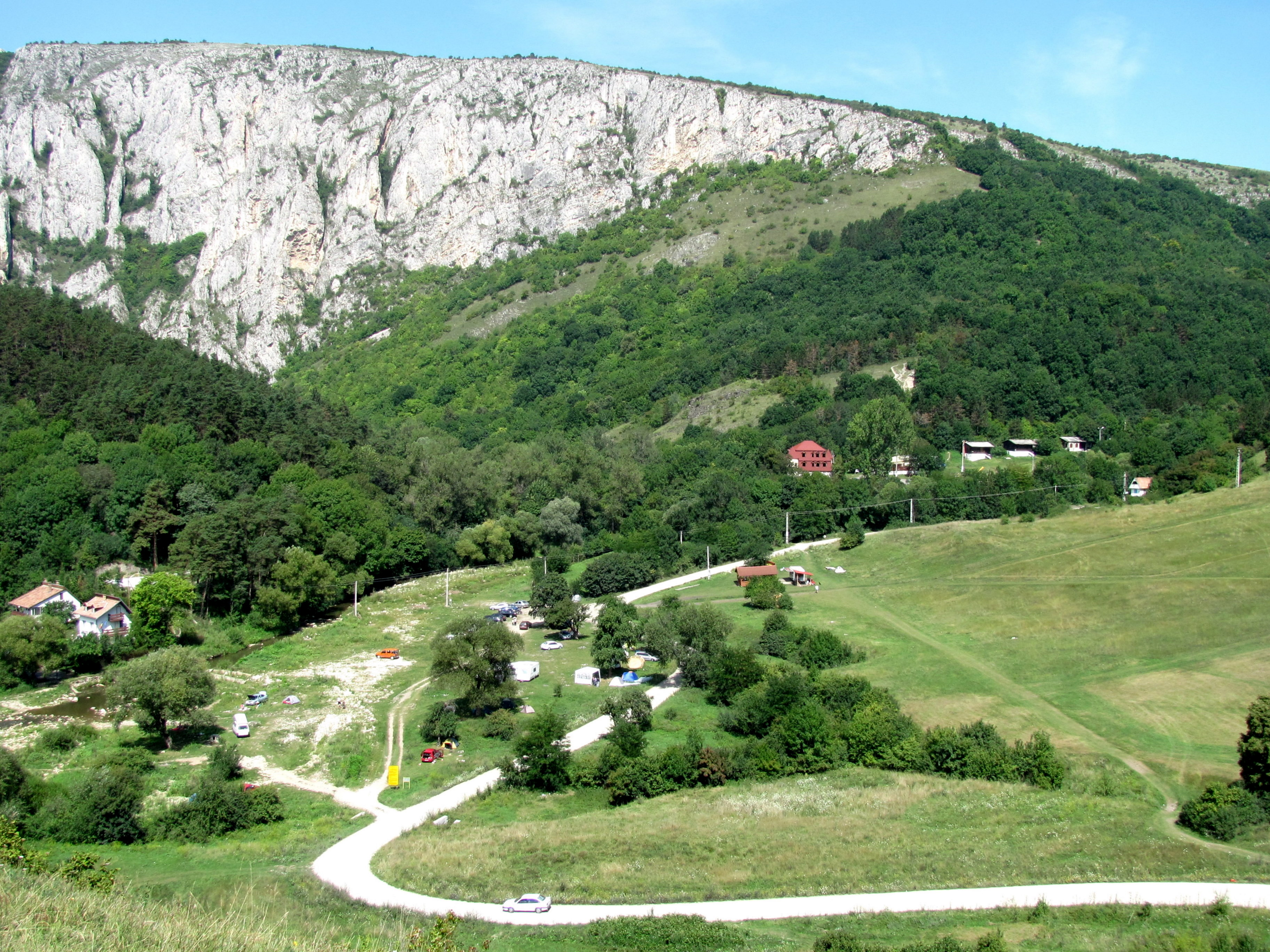
Cheile Turzii

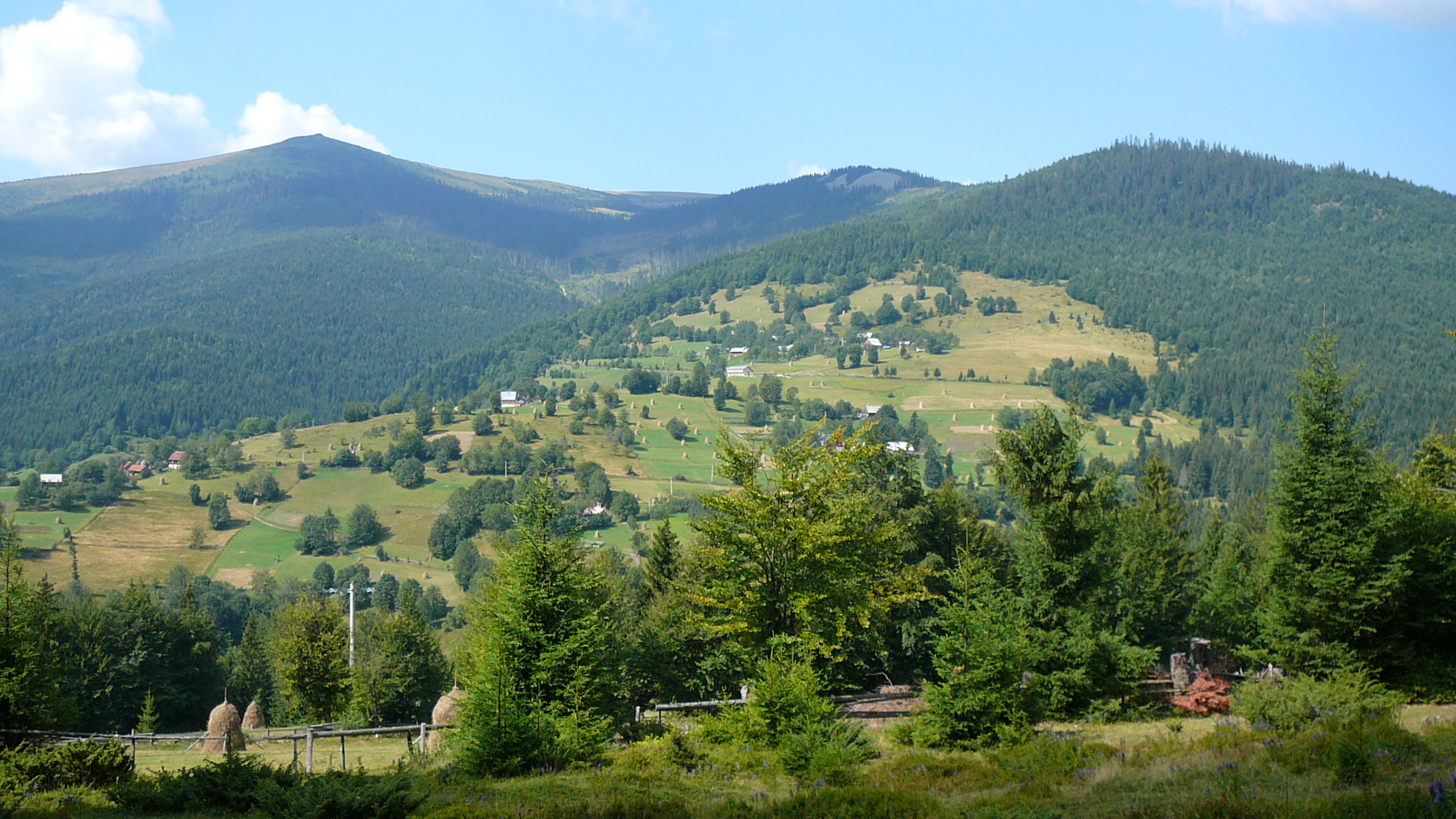
Arieșeni

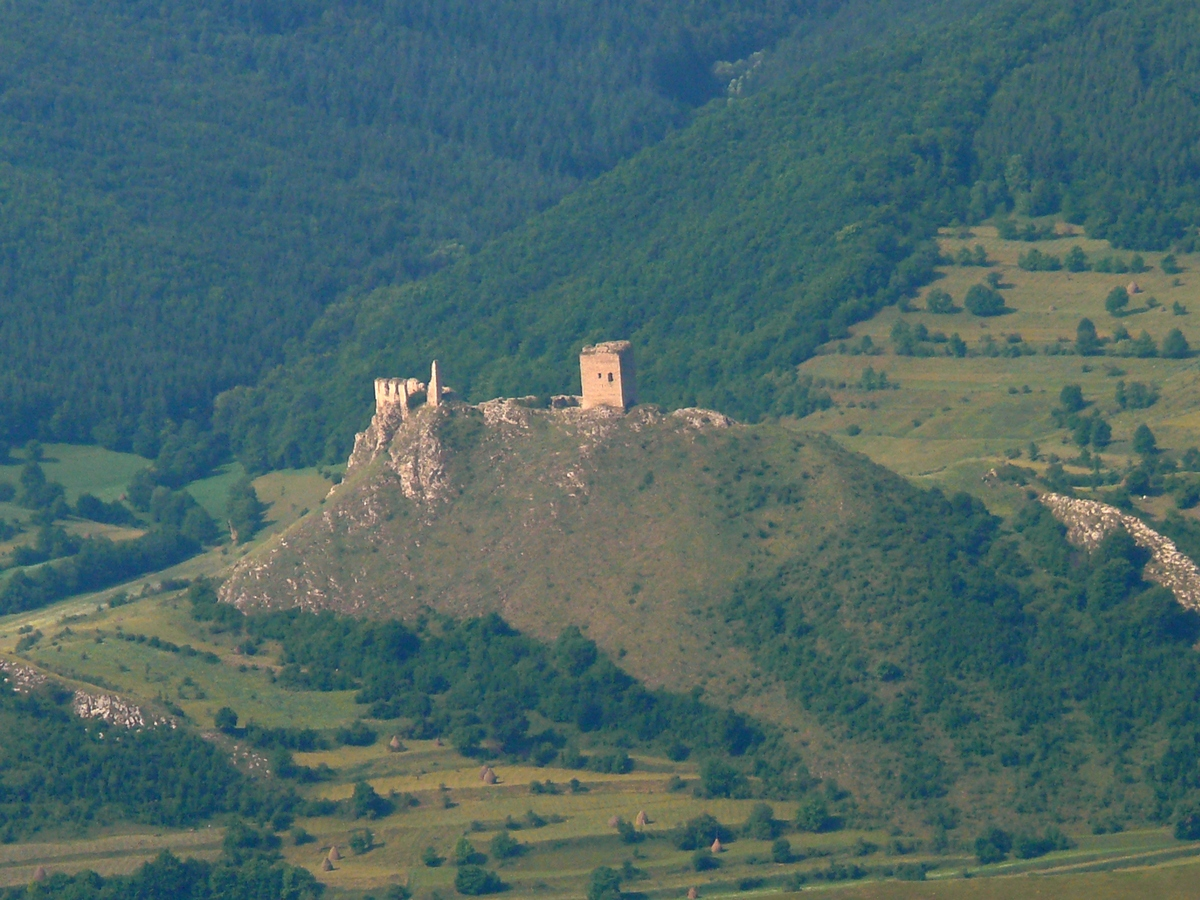
Cetatea Trascăului

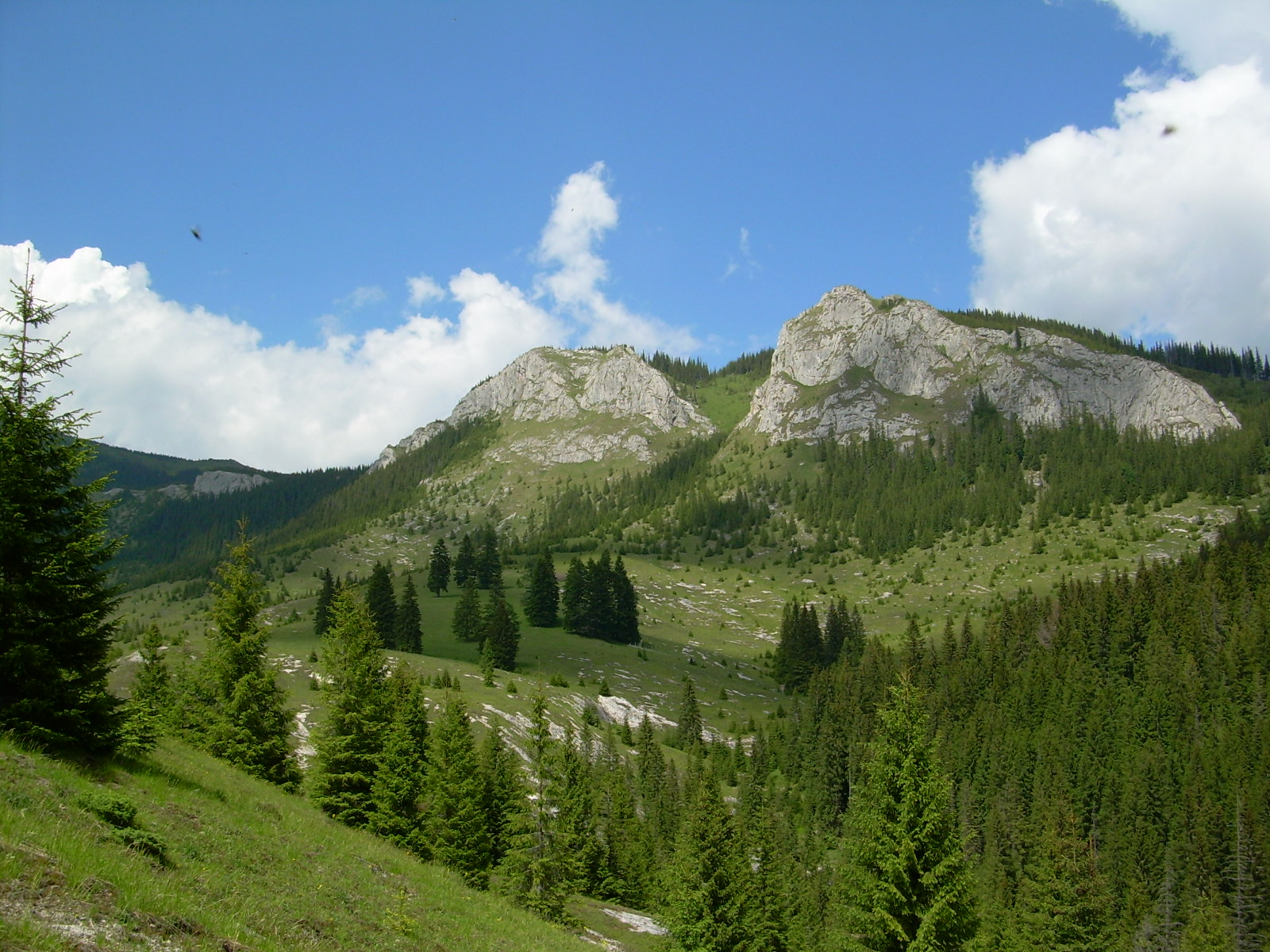
Pietrele Albe

== See also ==
- Țara Moților
- Apuseni Natural Park
