= Șimleu Mountains =

Mountain range in Romania

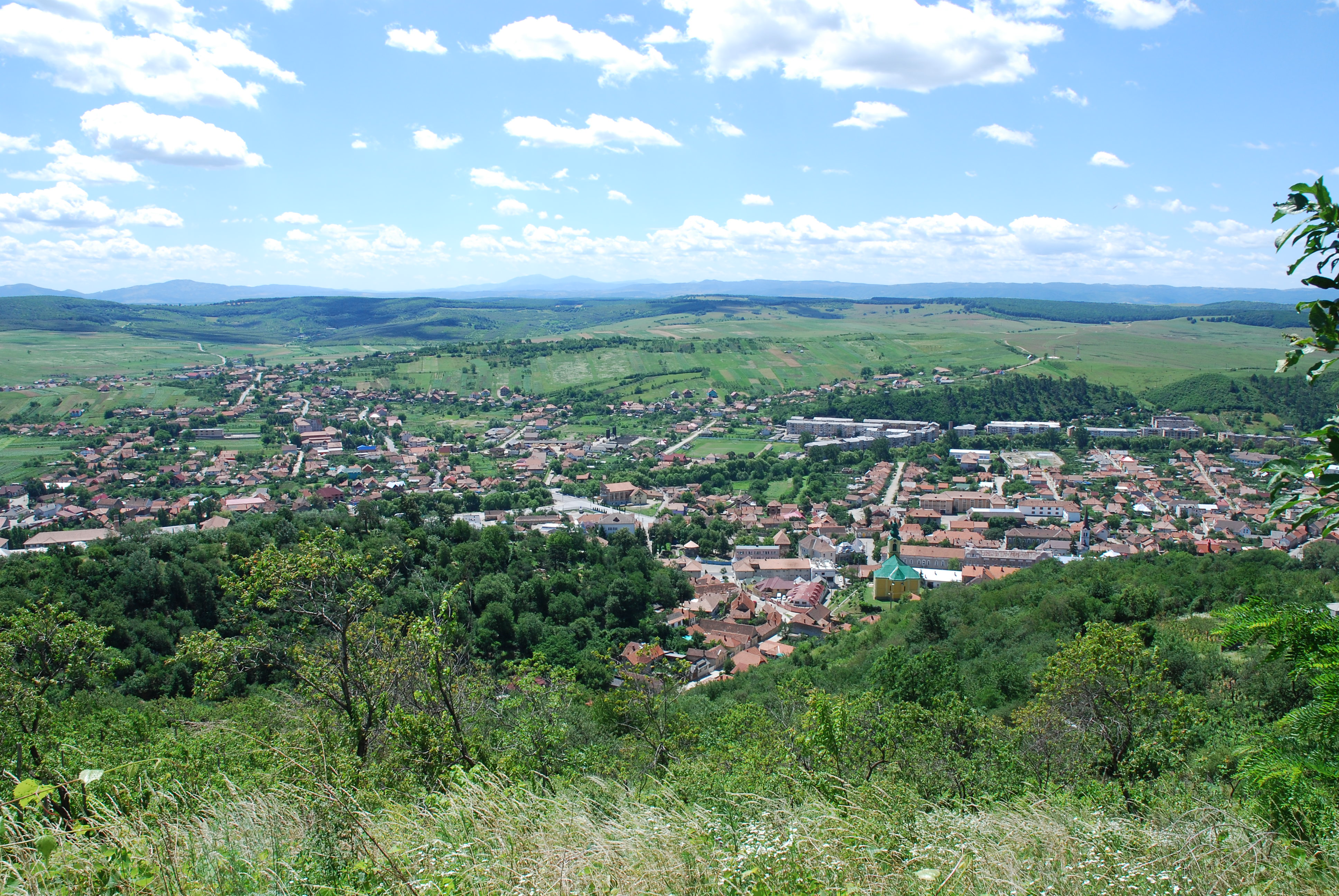
- Șimleu Mountains and Șimleu Silvaniei

Highest point
- Peak: Vârful Măgura Șimleului
- Elevation: 597 m (1,959 ft)

Naming
- Native name: Munții Șimleu (Romanian)

Geography
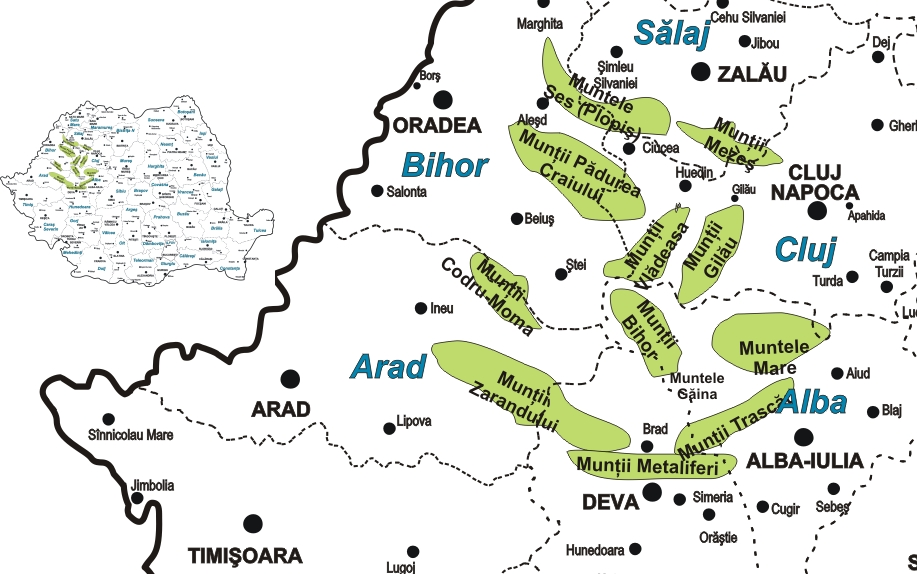
- Șimleu Mountains within the Apuseni Mountains
- Country: Romania

The Șimleu Mountains (Romanian: Munții Șimleu) is a mountain range in Transylvania, Romania, which belongs to the Apuseni Mountains. The highest peak is Vârful Măgura Șimleului, with an altitude of 597 metres (1,959 ft).
