= Milliarium of Aiton =

Ancient Roman artifact in Romania

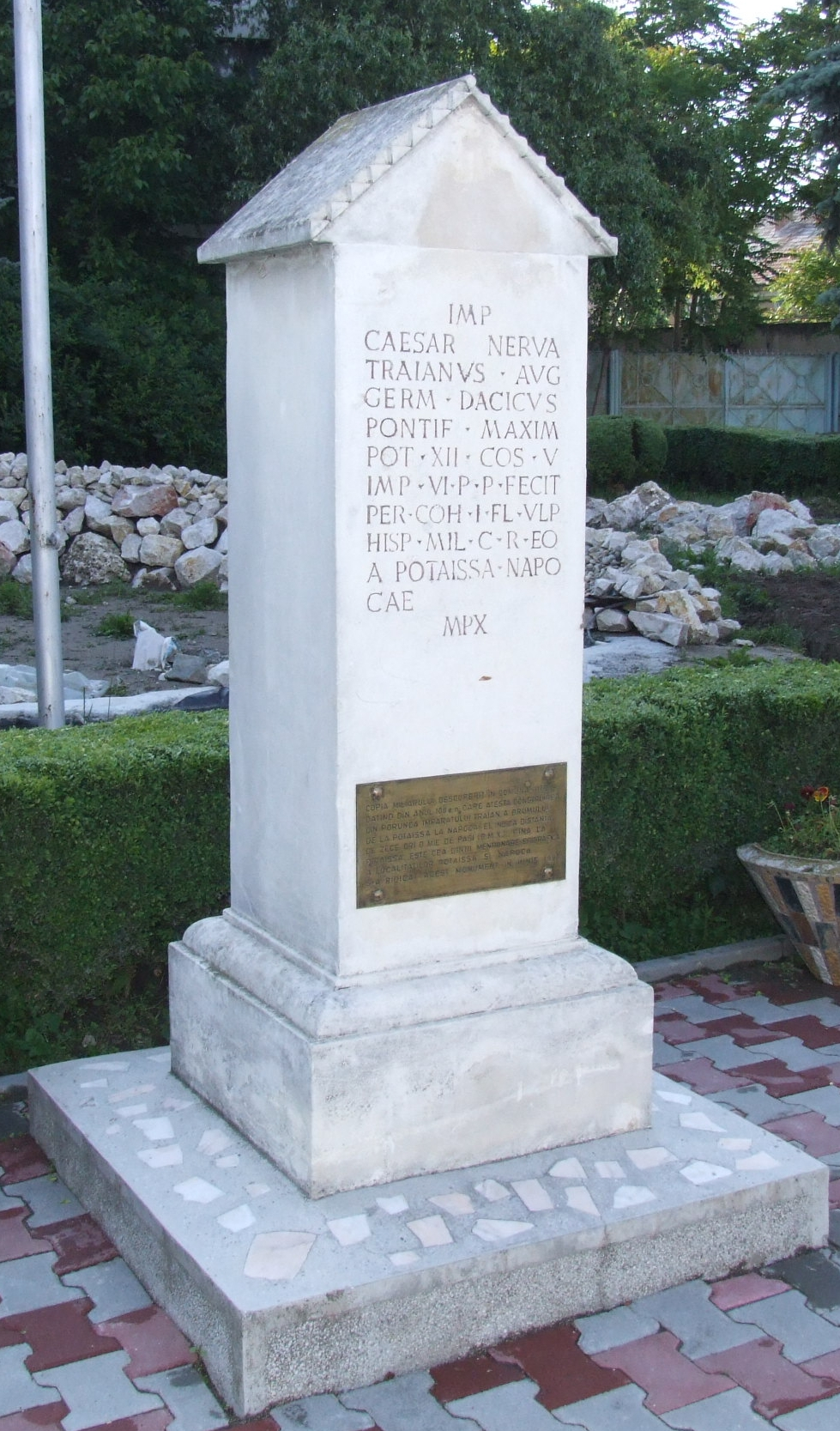
A copy of the Milliarium of Aiton erected in June 1993 in front of the Turda Post Office

The Milliarium of Aiton is an ancient Roman milliarium (milestone) discovered in the 1758 in Aiton commune, near Cluj-Napoca, Romania. Dating from 108 AD, shortly after the Roman conquest of Dacia, the milestone shows the construction of the road from Potaissa to Napoca, by demand of the Emperor Trajan. It indicates the distance of ten thousand Roman feet ("M.P.X.") to Potaissa. This is the first epigraphical attestation of the settlements of Potaissa and Napoca in Roman Dacia.

== Background ==
The complete inscription is: "Imp(erator)/ Caesar Nerva/ Traianus Aug(ustus)/ Germ(anicus) Dacicus/ pontif(ex) maxim(us)/ (sic) pot(estate) XII co(n)s(ul) V/ imp(erator) VI p(ater) p(atriae) fecit/ per coh(ortem) I Fl(aviam) Vlp(iam)/ Hisp(anam) mil(liariam) c(ivium) R(omanorum) eq(uitatam)/ a Potaissa Napo/cam / m(ilia) p(assuum) X". It was recorded in the Corpus Inscriptionum Latinarum, vol. III, the 1627, Berlin, 1863.

This milliarium is an attestation of the road known to be built by Cohors I Hispanorum miliaria.

A copy of this milliarium was erected in June 1993 in front of the Turda Post Office (1 Dec. 1918 Street). Another copy exists in the front of the Aiton School.

== Gallery ==
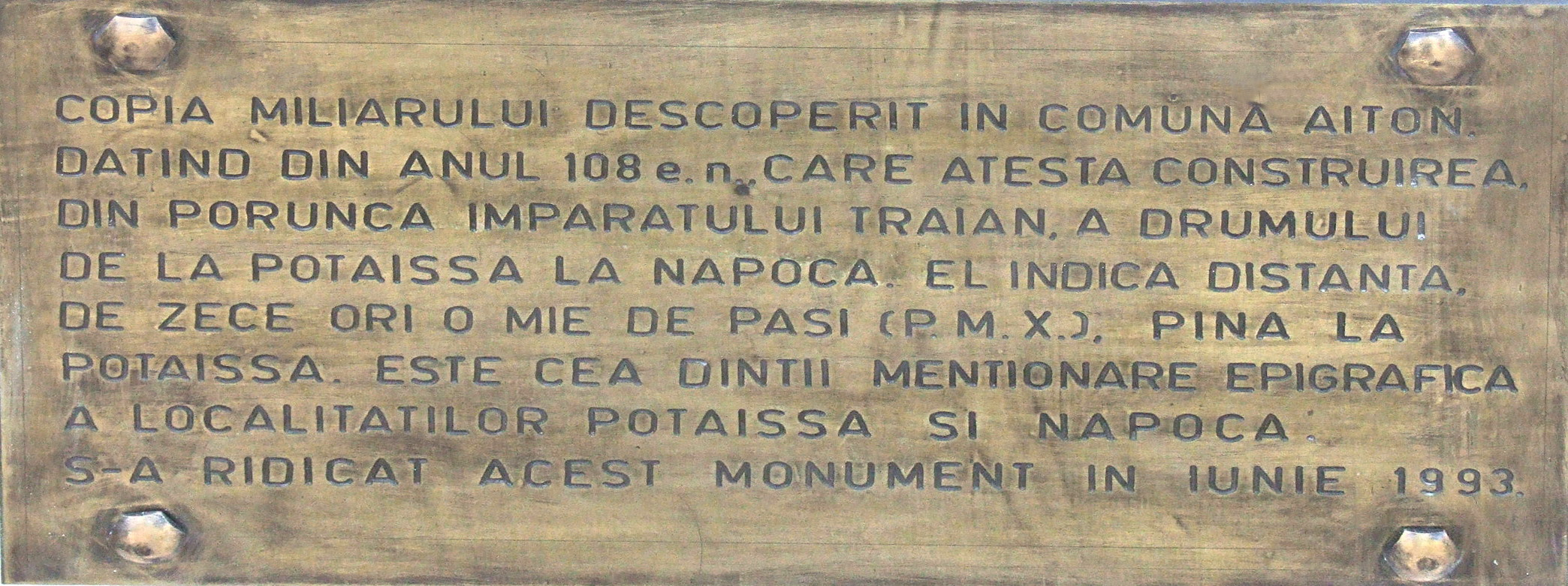
Modern plaque from the monument in Turda

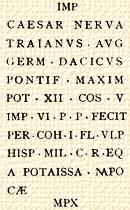
Latin inscription from the milliarium

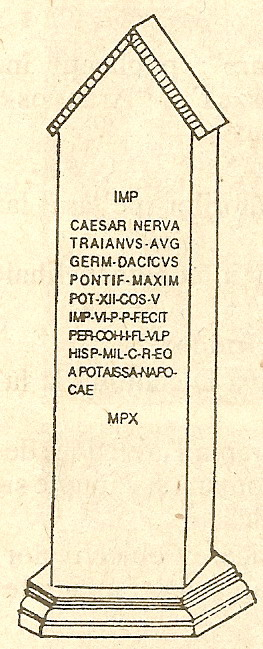
1758 Drawing of the original milliarium

== See also ==
- Napoca
- Potaissa
- Roman roads
- History of Transylvania
