= Bihor Mountains =

Mountains in Apuseni from Romania

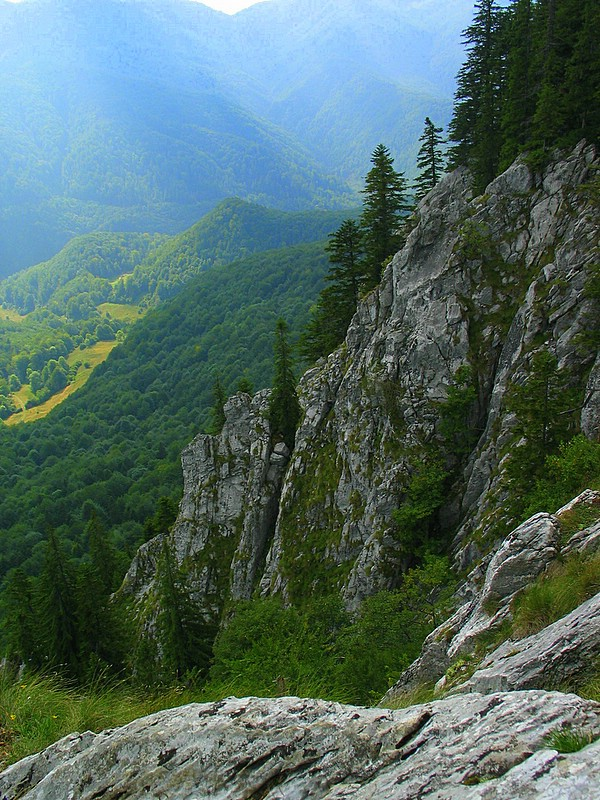
- The Galbenei Stone, Bihor Mountains

Highest point
- Peak: Cucurbăta Mare
- Elevation: 1,849 m (6,066 ft)
- Coordinates: 46°27′N 22°41′E

Dimensions
- Length: 25 km (16 mi)
- Width: 14 km (8.7 mi)

Naming
- Native name: Munții Bihorului (Romanian)

Geography
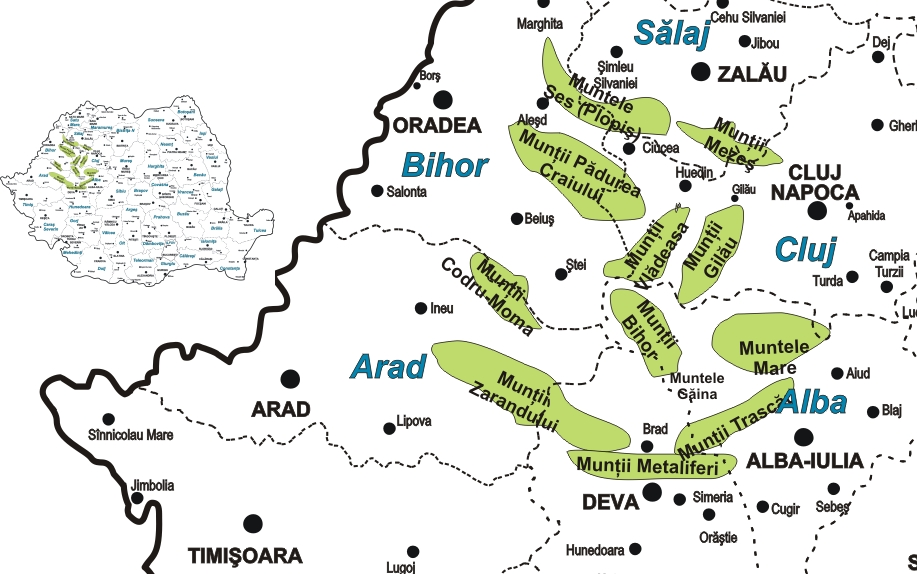
- Bihor Mountains within the Apuseni Mountains
- Country: Romania
- Region(s): Transylvania, Crișana
- Counties: Alba; Arad; Bihor; Hunedoara
- Parent range: Apuseni Mountains

Bihor Mountains (Romanian: Munții Bihorului, Hungarian: Bihar-hegység) is a mountain range in western Romania. It is the highest point of the Apuseni Mountains, which are part of the Carpathian Mountains.

The massif has a length of 25 kilometres (16 mi) from the northwest to the southeast and a width of 14 kilometres (8.7 mi). It is located east of the town Ștei, Bihor County and north of the town of Brad, Hunedoara County.

The highest peak is Cucurbăta Mare, with an elevation of 1,849 metres (6,066 ft); this also the highest peak of the Apuseni Mountains. Other high peaks are Buteasa (1,790 m), Curcubăta Mică (1769 m), and Piatra Grăitoare (1,658 m).

The Vlădeasa Massif is a volcanic range extension of the Bihor Mountains to the north, reaching a maximum height of 1,836 metres (6,024 ft).
