= Cucurbăta Mare =

Peak in the Bihor Mountains of Romania

Coordinates: 46.4409°N 22.6889°E

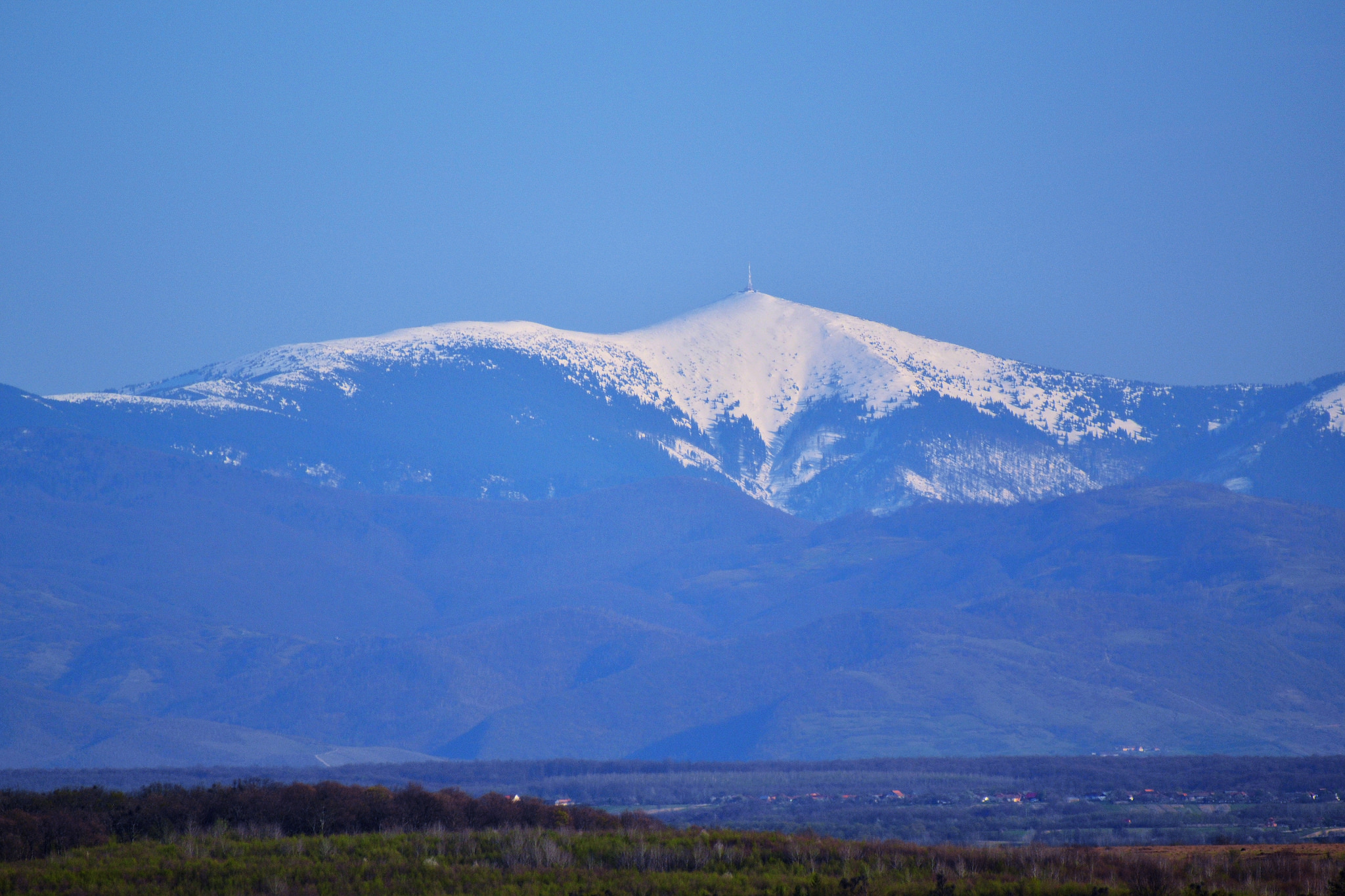

Curcubăta Mare (Hungarian: Nagy-Bihar), also known as Bihor Peak, is a mountain in the Bihor Mountains. It is located in the southeastern part of Bihor County, near the border with Alba County, in Romania. It is 1,849 metres (6,066 ft) high and the tallest mountain in the Western Romanian Carpathians.
