= CSO Ștei =

Romanian football club

- Full name: Clubul Sportiv Orășenesc Ștei
- Nicknames: Șteienii (The People from Ștei); Minerii (The Miners)
- Short name: Ștei
- Founded: 24 June 2010; 16 years ago
- Ground: Minerul
- Capacity: 800
- Owner: Ștei Town
- Chairman: Marius Junc
- Manager: Voicu Popa
- League: Liga IV
- 2025–26: Liga IV, Bihor County, 6th of 14
Home colours	Away colours	Third colours

Clubul Sportiv Orășenesc Ștei, commonly known as CSO Ștei, or simply as Ștei, is a Romanian football club based in Ștei, Bihor County. The club was founded in 2010 to continue the long history of football in town, history that was near the end with the bankruptcy of the more known Minerul Ștei and Oțelul Ștei.

== History ==
The town of Ștei is a relatively young one, being founded only in 1952, near the former village, which had the same name. The small settlement was projected to be an important town, during the presence of Nazi Germany in Romania, during the early 1940s, due to the uranium deposits that were found at Băița mine near Ștei. Subsequently, as a consequence of the World War II, the Germans left Romania and the Soviets took control and built the dreamed town in only four years.

The new town was projected to have 25,000 inhabitants, also dozens of blocks and barracks, an administrative palace, five cinemas, three dance rings, two schools (a Romanian one and a Russian one), a dispensary, a sports base, a restaurant and shops were built. Ștei was thus included in the category of working-class cities along with other localities such as Uricani, Ciudanovița, Victoria or Scornicești, also being named as Dr. Petru Groza, between 1958 and 1996, after the Romanian Socialist leader, who had died in 1958.

=== Minerul and Oțelul (1954–2010) ===
As part of the town's development, the Soviets founded the first football club in 1954 and named it Minerul (The Miner), playing its home matches on Minerul Stadium, built also in the early 1950s, with a capacity of 800 people.

Minerul won Divizia D – Bihor County in 1964, 10 years after its foundation, and promoted for the first time in its history in the Divizia C. "The miners" spent four seasons at the level of the third tier, before relegating, with a 6th place (at the end of the 1966–67 edition) as the best ranking. The team from Bihor Mountains promoted again in 1972, but this time spent no less than seven seasons in the third league, before relegating again, now with a best ranking achieved at the end of the 1974–75 season, a 5th place.

The other team of the town, Oțelul (The Steel) was founded in the 1970s and was owned by the Mechanical Factory of Ștei. In contrast to its rival, Oțelul was a much constant presence at the level of the third tier, promoting for the first time in 1976 and relegating only at the end of the 1991–92 season, after 16 consecutive years in the league. The best ranking for "the metalsmiths" (as they were known) was a 2nd place obtained in 1991, classification that is also the best in the history of football from Ștei. Oțelul used to play its home matches on Oțelul Stadium, built in the 1980s, with a capacity of 5,000 seats, now a ruin, after years of negligence.

During the 1980s, an intense rivalry was born between Minerul Bihor and Oțelul Bihor (as they were known before 1996), with very disputed matches at the level of Divizia C. The victory was sometimes claimed by "the miners", other times by "the metalsmiths", but finally in 1992, after the fall of communism in Romania, both teams encountered financial problems and were relegated to the fourth division. Minerul took the leadership in the 1990s and promoted back to Divizia C, equaling the best ranking in the history of the club, a 3rd place, in 1997 and having a last sparkle, under private ownership, during the 2003–04 season, when they finished 6th in their series of Divizia C, but then withdrew due to financial difficulties. Oțelul had a last appearance at the level of Divizia C during the 2000–01 edition, but ended on the 12th place and relegated, then evolving only in the County Championship.

Decline of mining in Romania and the mostly failed privatization of the Mechanical Factory, brought both clubs near to collapse in the middle 2000s, first club that decided to withdraw and declare its bankruptcy being Minerul, in 2008, followed two years later by Oțelul.

Overall, the town of Ștei, spent 30 seasons at the level of Divizia C, in the 11 of them, both teams being members. The best ranking was the 2nd place obtained by Oțelul in 1991, followed by a 3rd place achieved by the same team in 1989 and by the rival Minerul on two occasions, 1983 and 1997.

=== Football refuses to die (2010–present) ===
The 2008 financial crisis and the already poor economical situation of the little industrial town, which remained basically without its first economical engine, the industry, resulted in bankruptcy. The withdrawal of Oțelul in the middle of the 2009–10 season, made the Local Council to take action and on 24 June 2010, it was approved the foundation of CSO Ștei, a team meant to continue the rich history of football from Ștei.

CSO was enrolled in the Liga V and promoted at the end of the 2010–11 season, then remaining at the level of Liga IV, for the moment, without the financial capacity of hoping for more. The new team from Ștei, obtained the following rankings: 6th (2012–13), 6th (2013–14), 5th (2014–15), 6th (2015–16), 10th (2016–17), 14th (2017–18) and 11th (2018–19).

== Grounds ==
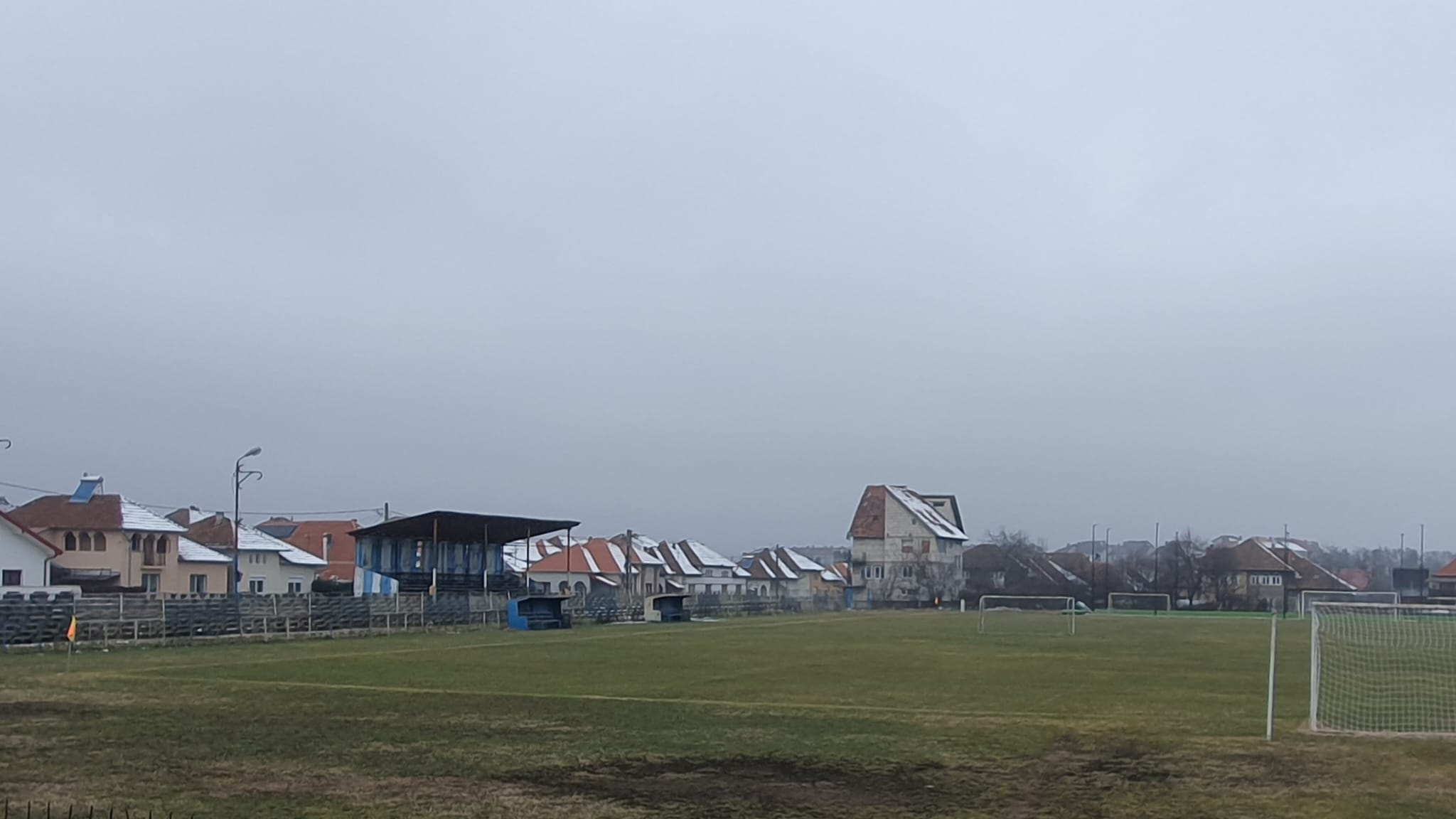
Minerul Stadium

The two main football grounds in Ștei are Minerul Stadium and Oțelul Stadium.

Minerul Stadium was built by the Soviets in the early 1950s and was opened in 1954, being the home ground of Minerul Ștei for 54 years, until its dissolution in 2008. The stadium has a capacity of 800 people and was owned after 1989 by the National Uranium Company, reaching a precarious state in the early 2010s.

Oțelul Stadium was built by the Mechanical Factory and inaugurated in the early 1980s, being the home ground of Oțelul Ștei for more than 35 years, until its dissolution in 2010. The stadium has a capacity of 5,000 people and it is owned by Transilvania GIE, company that bought the old factory. The stadium is now basically a ruin, being totally neglected since 2010.

When CSO Ștei was founded the problem of a home ground appeared, both stadiums being in a state of degradation and none in the administration of the Town of Ștei. Finally, the National Uranium Company agreed to allow the new football club to play on Minerul Stadium, which started to be the home ground of the newly formed football team.

== Support ==
CSO Ștei has many supporters in Ștei and especially in Beiuș Depression. The fanbase of the team is formed of former supporters of Minerul and Oțelul and they are well known in Bihor County for their high attachment to the team, most of the time putting a lot of pressure on their opponents.

=== Rivalries ===
The club's main rivalries are especially against teams based in the Beiuș Depression. Bihorul Beiuș is considered to be the bitter rival, as it is based in the most important city of the region and at only 20 km away from Ștei.

In the past it was a great industrial rivalry in Ștei, rivalry that moved on the football pitch and gave birth in the 1980s to a confrontation known as Derby of Ștei. The derby was disputed between Minerul Ștei (representing the mining industry) and Oțelul Ștei (representing the steel industry), the matches were always very tense, regardless of the level at which they took place.

== Honours ==
- Liga V – Bihor County
  - Winners (1): 2010–11

== Current squad ==
As of 1 March 2025

Note: Flags indicate national team as defined under FIFA eligibility rules; some limited exceptions apply. Players may hold more than one non-FIFA nationality.

No.	Pos.	Nation	Player
1	GK	ROU	George Ștef
2	MF	ROU	George Bogdan (Vice-Captain)
3	MF	ROU	Andrei Nistor
4	DF	ROU	Dacian Gheban
5	FW	ROU	Rareș Vulciu
6	MF	ROU	Rareș Vuluga
7	FW	ROU	Ionuț Oncică
8	MF	ROU	Alexandru Clepcea
9	FW	ROU	Mario Junc (on loan from Oșorhei)
10	MF	ROU	Andrei Grosu
11	MF	ROU	Andrei Prața
13	MF	ROU	Sergiu Ban (on loan from Oșorhei)
14	MF	ROU	Antonio Mir
15	MF	ROU	Mihai Isai

No.	Pos.	Nation	Player
16	DF	ROU	Cristian Bilă
17	DF	ROU	Andrei Gruie
18	MF	ROU	Lucian Junc (Captain)
19	MF	ROU	Robert Pădurean
20	DF	ROU	Coriolan Chiș
23	FW	ROU	Adrian Tat
24	MF	ROU	Andrei Secui
28	MF	ROU	Alexandru Raț
55	GK	ROU	David Negrea
—	DF	ROU	Paul Ienciu
—	DF	ROU	Florin Treabă
—	MF	ROU	Darius Costea
—	MF	ROU	Laurențiu Criste

== Club officials ==
=== Board of directors ===
Role	Name
Owner	(Romania) Ștei Town
President	(Romania) Marius Junc
Vice-presidents	(Romania) Dănuț Pașca (Romania) Lucian Moș
Secretary	(Romania) Radu Sere

=== Current technical staff ===
Role	Name
Manager	(Romania) Voicu Popa
Assistant coach	(Romania) Sandu Balaj
Storeman	(Romania) Florin Raț

== League history ==
Season	Tier	Division	Place	Cupa României
2019–20	4	Liga IV (BH)	4th	
2018–19	4	Liga IV (BH)	11th	
2017–18	4	Liga IV (BH)	14th	
2016–17	4	Liga IV (BH)	10th	
2015–16	4	Liga IV (BH)	6th	

Season	Tier	Division	Place	Cupa României
2014–15	4	Liga IV (BH)	5th	
2013–14	4	Liga IV (BH)	6th	
2012–13	4	Liga IV (BH)	6th	
2011–12	4	Liga IV (BH)	10th	
2010–11	5	Liga V (Seria III)	1st (C, P)	
