= Crișul Băița =

Crișul Băița Crișul Băiței
- Location within Romania

Location
- Country: Romania
- Counties: Bihor County
- Villages: Băița, Nucet, Fânațe, Câmpani, Lunca

Physical characteristics
- Mouth: Crișul Negru
  - location: Ștei
  - coordinates: 46.5430°N 22.4427°E
- Length: 21.2 km (13.2 mi)
- Basin size: 90 km^{2} (35 sq mi)

Basin features
- Progression: Crișul Negru→ Körös→ Tisza→ Danube→ Black Sea
- Tributaries
  - right: Sighiștel

The Crișul Băița (also: Crișul Băiței) is a right tributary of the river Crișul Negru in Romania. Its length is 21.2 km (13.2 mi) and its basin size is 90 km^{2} (35 sq mi). It flows into the Crișul Negru in the town Ștei.
