= Murder of Anca Broscățeanu =

Romanian murder

Anca Broscățeanu was a Romanian 19-year-old girl who suddenly disappeared on July 6, 1977. A taxi driver, Gheorghe Samoilescu was convicted and pressed by authorities to make a false confession, and he was sentenced to 26 years in prison. Later, a witness reported that Romca Cozmici (c. 1956–1981) bragged about murdering someone. Cozmici, son of Securitate officer Efitimie Cozmici, former cell-mate with Romanian communist leaders Gheorghe Gheorghiu-Dej and Nicolae Ceaușescu, confessed to the murder and also confessed to murdering another young woman in 1980. Romca was sentenced to death for his crimes and was executed in 1981.

== Background ==
A 19-year-old, Anca Broscățeanu, went missing on July 6, 1977. Two days later, her severed hands were found. Eventually, the investigation concluded she was raped and strangled, several jewels being stripped from her possession.

== First arrest ==
Gheorghe Samoilescu, a 26-year-old taxi driver was considered the primary suspect. He was forced by the Securitate to make a false conffesion, and he was sentenced to 26 years in prison in February 1979.

== Second arrest ==
Not long after Samoilescu's sentencing, a witness claimed a man was bragging about murdering a woman. That man was identified as Romca Cozmici, roughly 21 at the time of Anca's murder, who worked at as an unqualified worker and had aspirations to be a painter. Cozmici was also the son of Eftimie Cozmici, Securitate officer and former cell-mate of Gheorghe Gheorghiu-Dej and Nicolae Ceaușescu, the former and at the time current dictators of Romania respectively. Romca confessed to murdering Broscățeanu, and also to murdering another woman in 1980. Cozmici was sentenced to death and executed in 1981.

== See also ==
- Ion Rîmaru
- Romulus Vereș
- Crime in Romania
