= Crime in Bucharest =

Crime in Bucharest is quite low in comparison to other European capital cities, with the number of total offences declining by 51% between 2000 and 2004, and by 7% between 2012 and 2013. Violent and organised crime is low (accounting for only 16% of total crimes committed), with petty crime and institutional corruption being more widespread.

== Violent and organised crime ==
The violent crime rate in Bucharest remains very low in comparison with other EU capitals. In 2007, 11 murders and 983 other violent offenses took place. In 2013, violent crimes fell by 13% from 2012, however there was a slight increase in murders compared to 2007 with 19 recorded murders (with suspects being arrested for 18 of them). Yet, considering the city's population of approximately 2 million, the number of violent crimes are considered low without a notable impact on public life.

Although there have been a number of police crackdowns on organised crime gangs, such as the Cămătaru clan and Babubudu gang, organised crime generally has a very much reduced impact on public life.

== Petty crime ==
Petty crime, however, is more common, particularly in the form of pickpocketing, which occurs mainly on the city's public transport network. Additionally, confidence tricks such as the Maradona scam are sometimes common, especially in regard to tourists. Levels of crime are higher in the southern districts of the city, particularly in Ferentari, a socially-disadvantaged area.

In Bucharest, there were almost 19,000 theft crimes in 2022, which increased by 5.9 percent since 2021. Nearly one third of theft was committed on the streets. Theft, however, has been on a downward trend for many years.

== Institutional and financial crimes ==
A significant problem in the city remains institutional corruption, which is seen as the most important justice-and-law related problem in the city. While corruption in Romania has declined in recent years due to various government efforts, Bucharest's level of institutional corruption remains somewhat higher than the Romanian average.

== See also ==
- Crime in Romania
