= Stadionul Minerul (Ștei) =

Romanian stadium

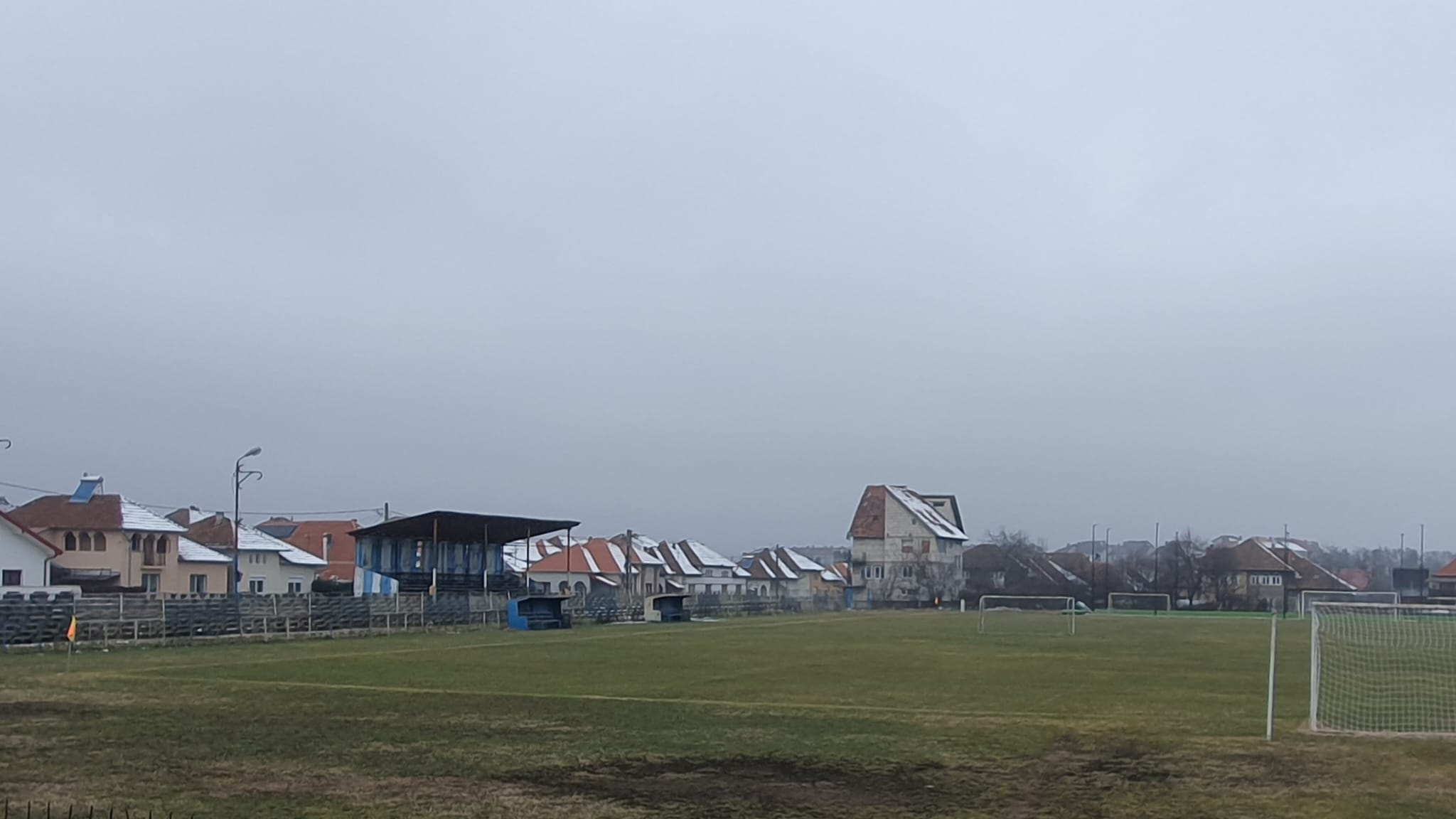
- Interactive map of Stadionul Minerul
- Address: Str. Crinului
- Location: Ștei, Romania
- Coordinates: 46°32′24.1″N 22°27′43.5″E
- Owner: Town of Ștei
- Operator: CSO Ștei
- Capacity: 800 seated
- Surface: Grass

Construction
- Opened: 1954

Tenants
- Minerul Ștei (1954–2008); CSO Ștei (2010–present)

Stadionul Minerul is a multi-purpose stadium in Ștei, Romania. It is currently used mostly for football matches, is the home ground of CSO Ștei and holds 800 people. The stadium was opened in 1954, being built by the Soviets during the town construction and was the home ground of Minerul Ștei until 2008, when the club was dissolved.

In 2015 the Town of Ștei started the procedure to get in the administration of the stadium, owned by the Uranium National Company.
