= Crime in Romania =

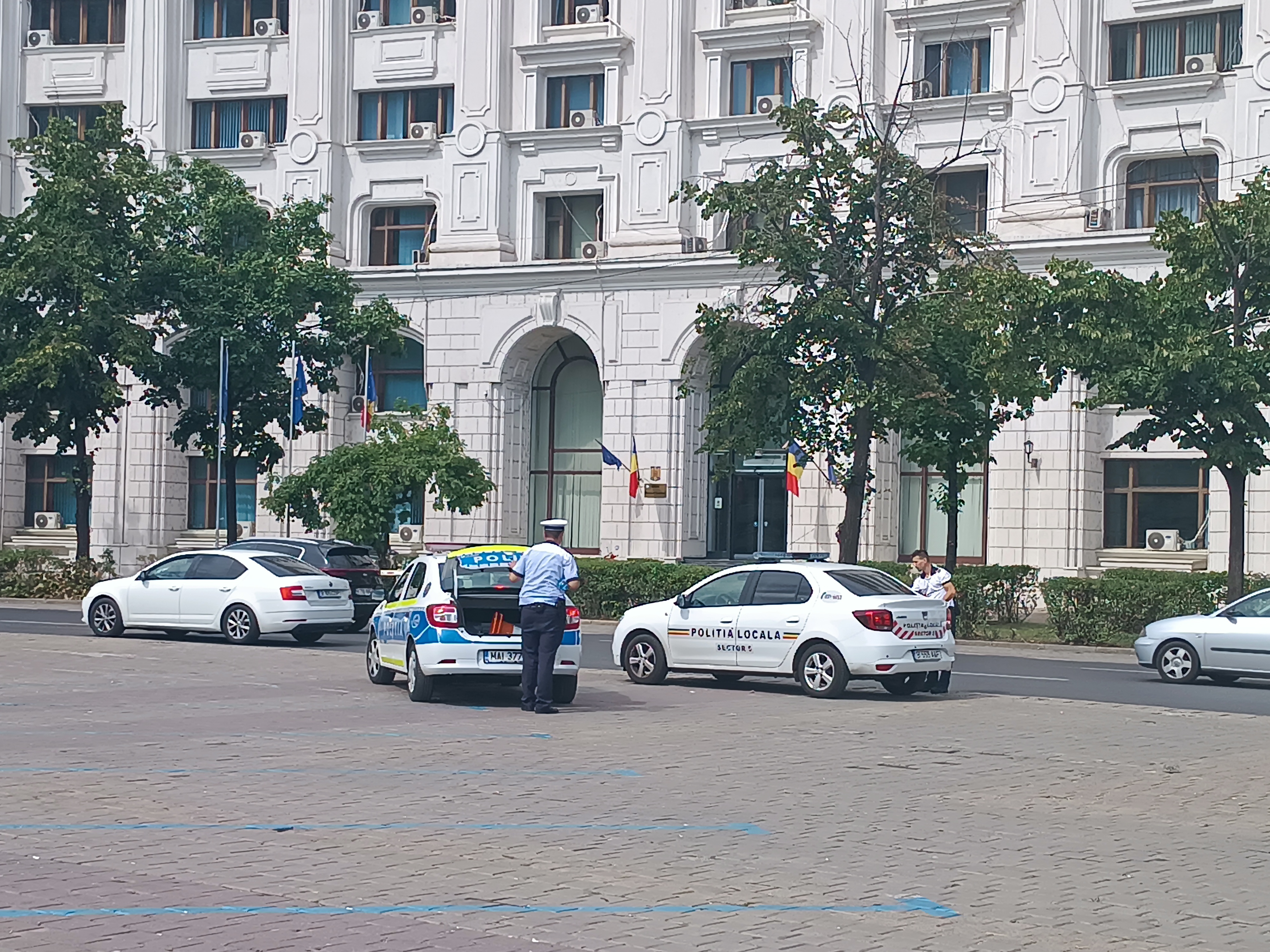
A car of the National Romanian Police and a car of the Local Police of Sector 5, in Bucharest

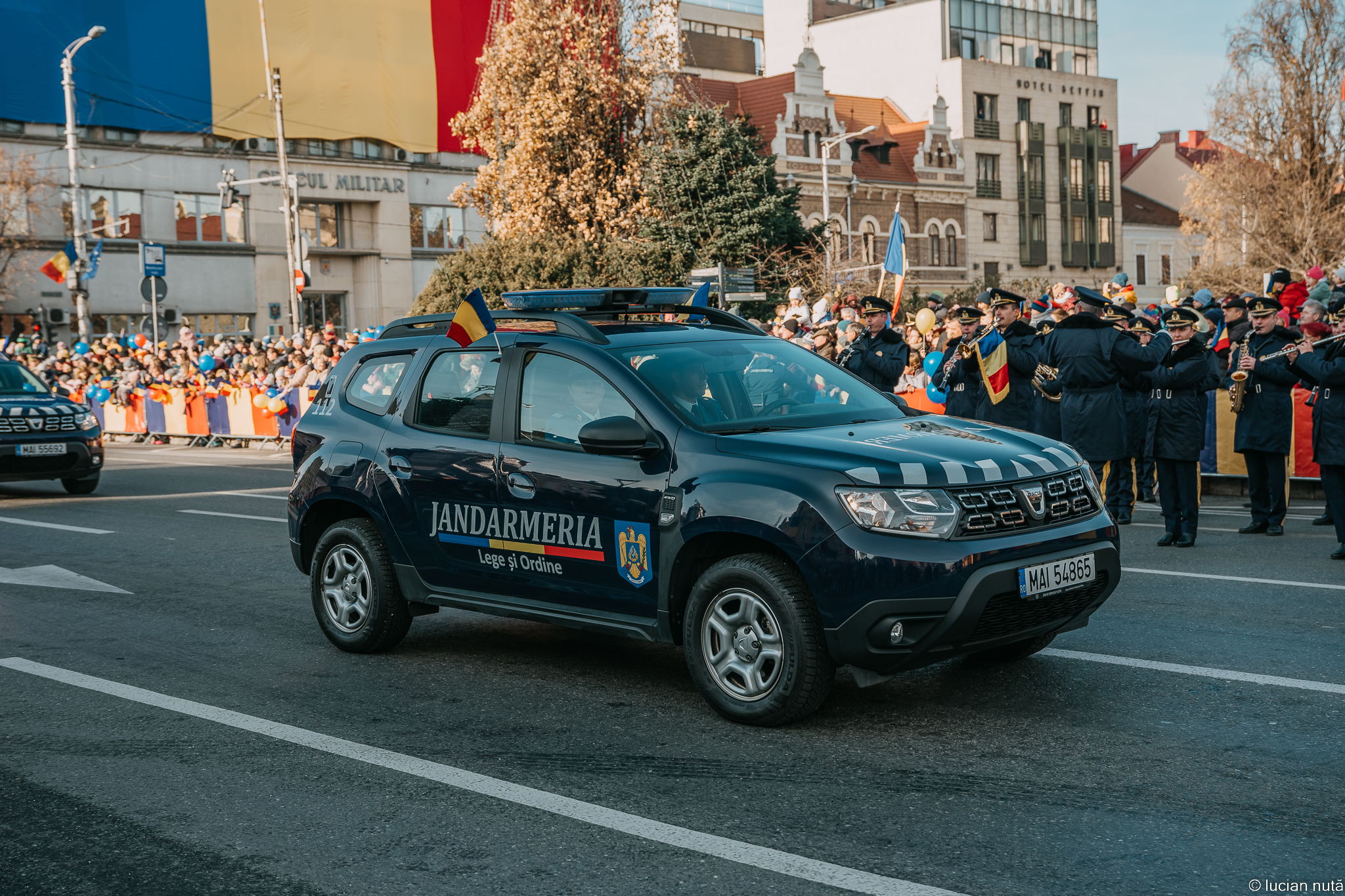
Romanian Gendarmerie car

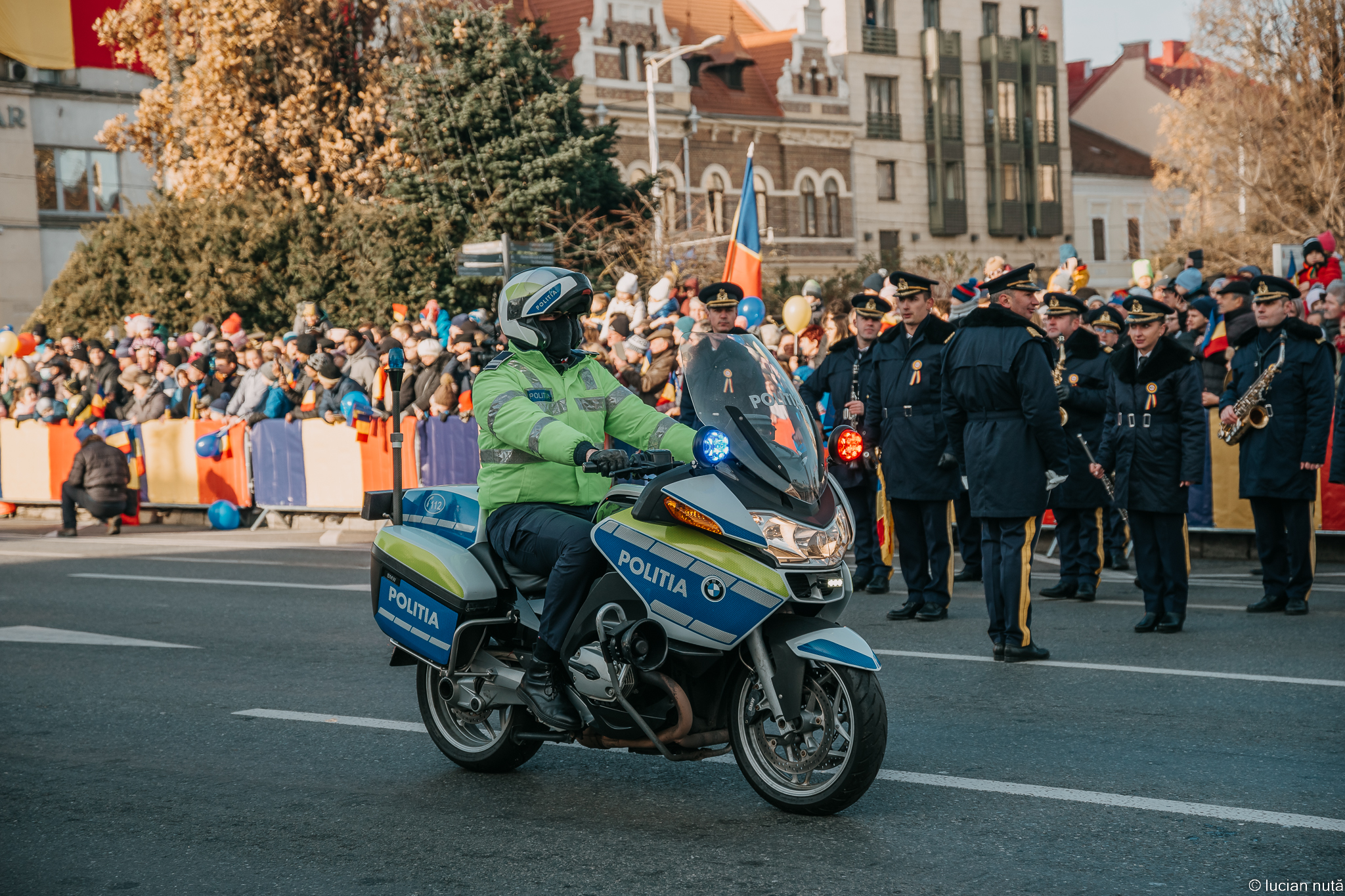
A motorcycle of the National Romanian Police

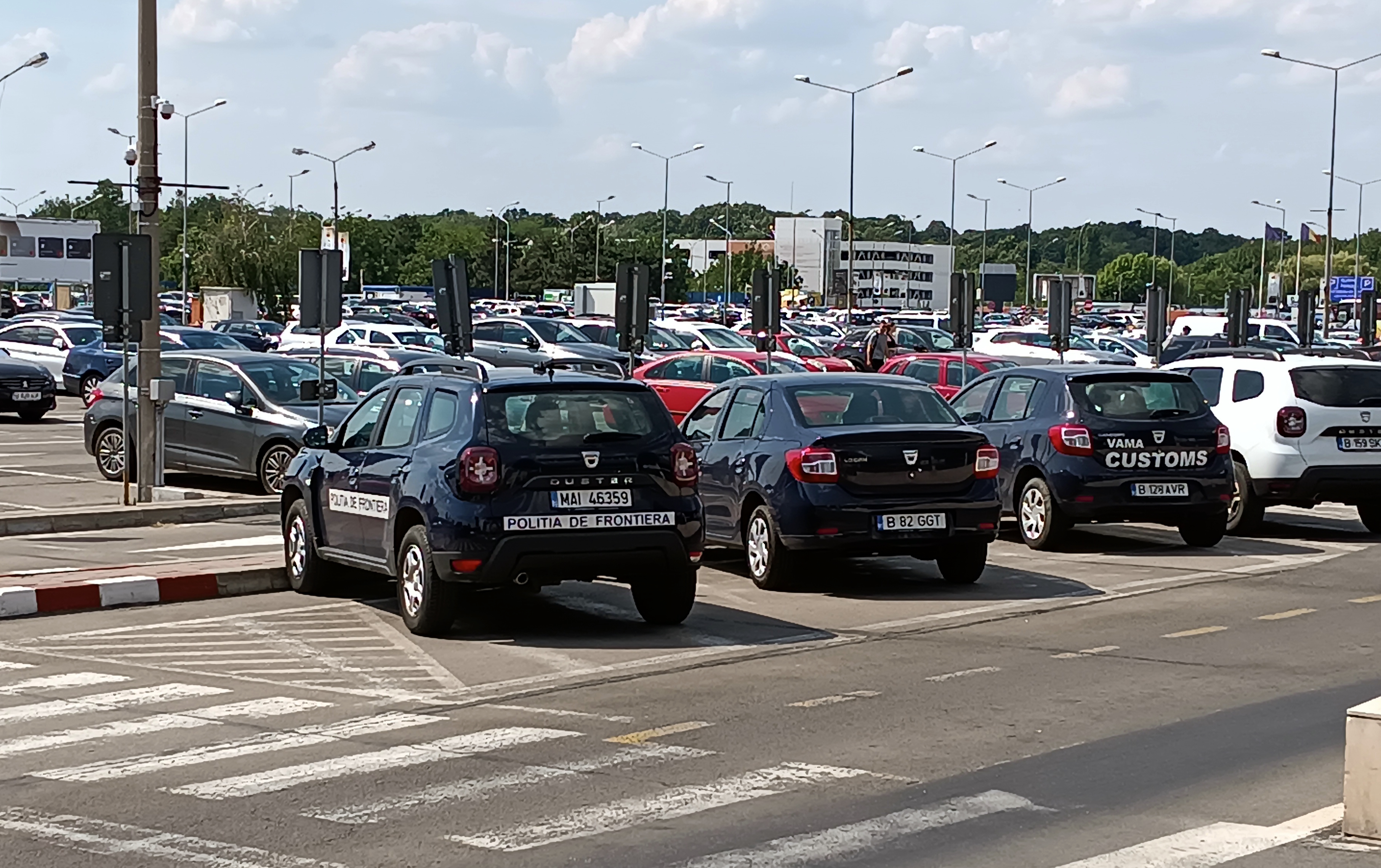
Cars of the Romanian Border Police at Henri Coandă International Airport

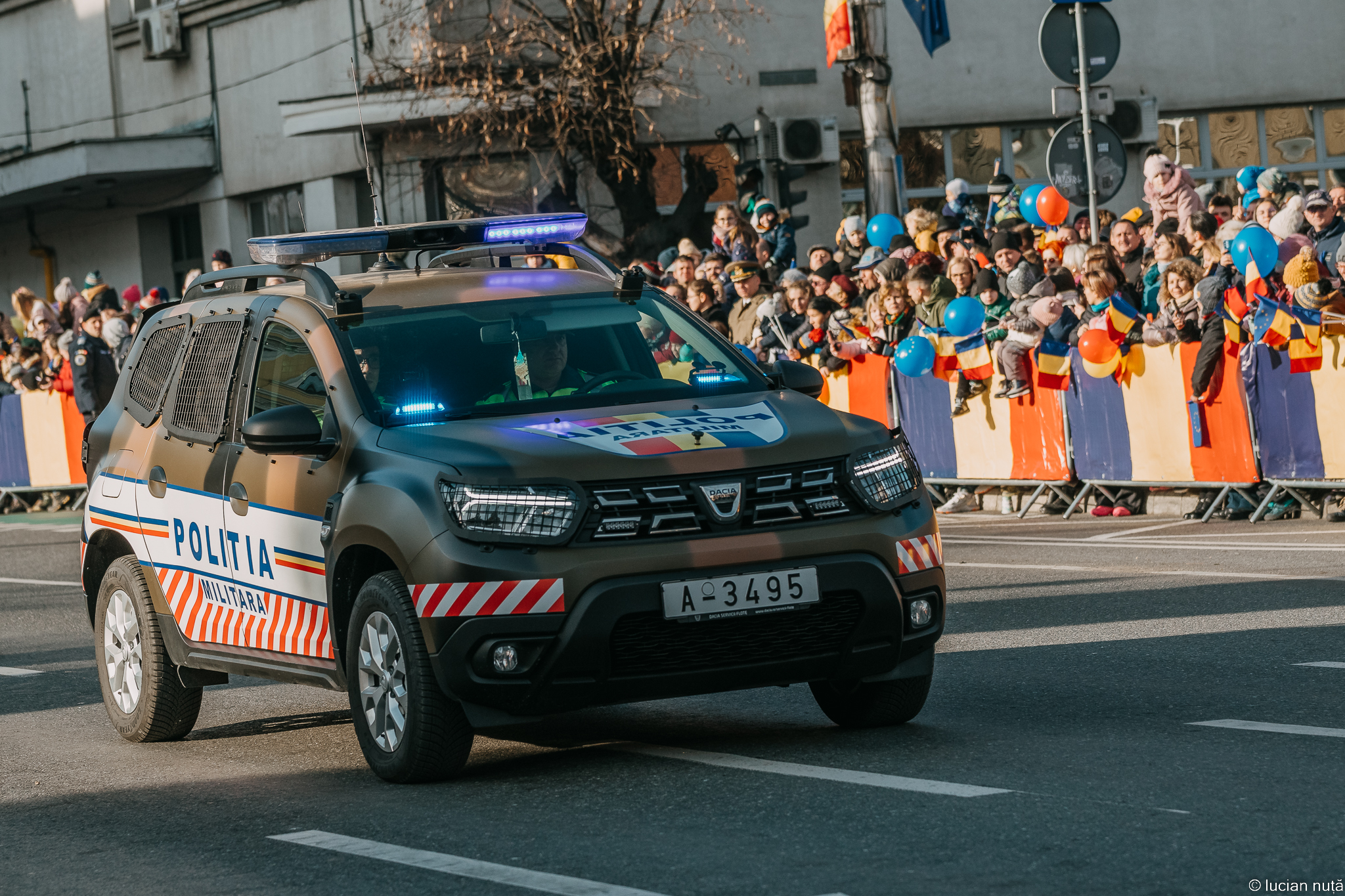
A car of the Romanian Military Police

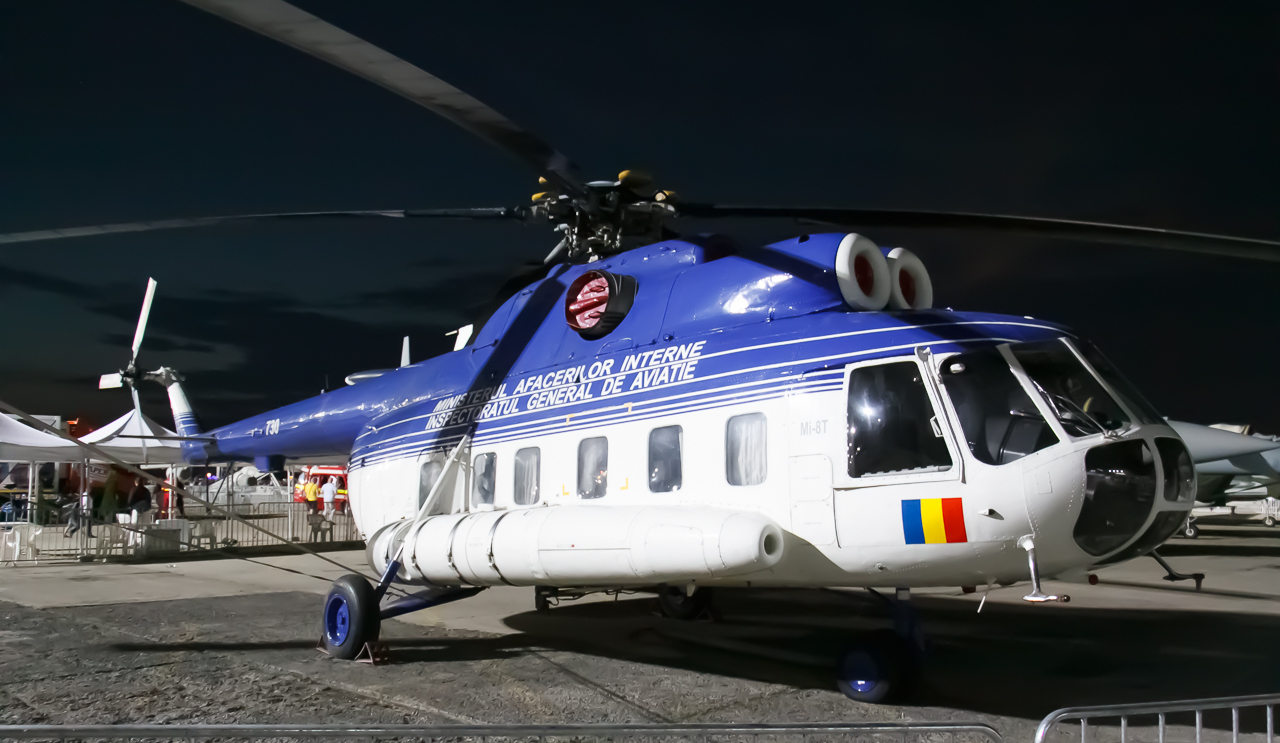
A Mil Mi-8 of the IGAv

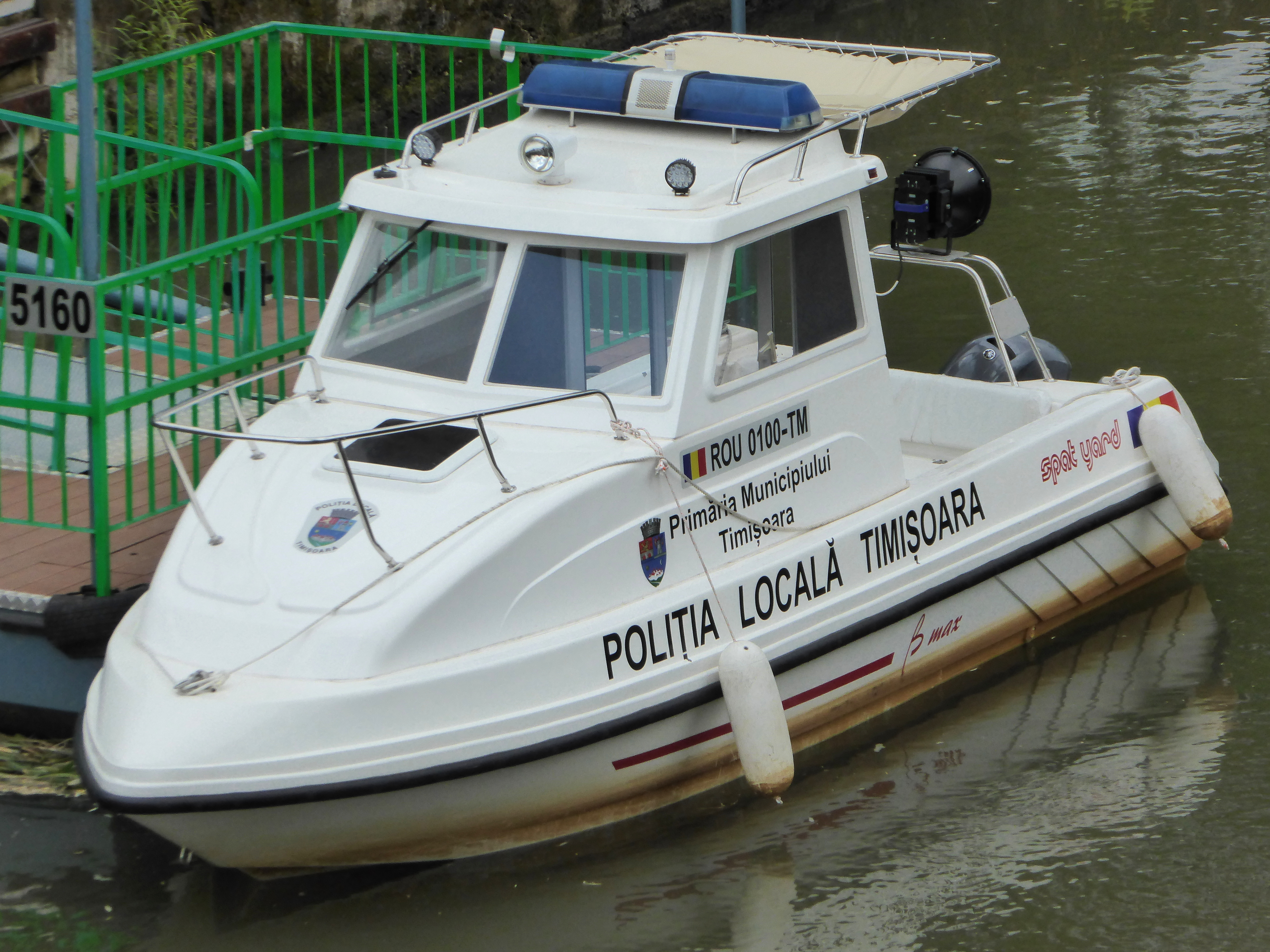
A boat of the Local Police of Timișoara

Crime in Romania is combated by the Romanian Police, Gendarmerie and other agencies.

== Crime by type ==
=== Violent crime ===
Romania differs from many countries in that violent crime is more likely to occur in rural areas than in cities, due to the socioeconomic problems of many parts of the countryside. Such rural areas often suffer from poverty, low levels of education of the population, and unemployment. For instance, Romania's Nord-Est development region is one of the poorest areas of the EU. By contrast, cities are very safe; in 2023 five Romanian cities, namely Cluj-Napoca, Timișoara, Brașov, Bucharest, and Iași, were ranked in the top 100 safest cities in the world.

Another peculiarity of Romania is that gun violence is exceptionally rare due to Romania having some of the strictest gun laws in the world. Most homicides are committed with sharp objects such as axes or knives. Among homicides in 2012, only 2% were by firearms, and among suicides in 2015, only 1% were by firearms. Violent crime was much higher in the 1990s.

=== Murder ===
In 2023, Romania had a murder rate of 1.09 per 100,000 population. There were a total of 213 murders in Romania in 2024.

=== Corruption ===
Due to Romania's entry into the EU, Romania has been forced to improve transparency and accountability in the public sector. However, citizens and businesses still consider the government's reform weak and slow due to poor implementation of laws on transparency of information and decision-making process. The EU Commission's latest Cooperation and Verification Mechanism report has however lauded the National Anticorruption Directorate and various other agencies in improving the fight against corruption, which has recently brought a number of high-profile convictions ranging from a former prime minister and parliamentarians to mayors and businessmen.

=== Crimes against tourists ===
The United States Department of State Bureau of Diplomatic Security stated in the Romania 2017 Crime & Safety Report that "Most crimes against visitors are limited to crimes of opportunity or scams." The report describes crimes such as individuals posing as plainclothes police officers, approaches of "quick friendship", pick-pocketing in crowded areas and public transportation, aggressive panhandlers, fraudulently charging exorbitant prices, and crimes against train passengers which cross rural areas. It also warned about avoiding areas with a higher frequency of crime such as the neighborhood of Ferentari in Bucharest. However, the report argued that it was driving which was "perhaps the biggest safety concern that visitors will encounter", due to disregard of driving laws.

=== Domestic violence ===
In the 2010 Eurobarometer poll on violence against women, 39% of Romanian respondents said that they thought DV in their country was "very common", 45% "fairly common", 8% "not very common", 0% "not at all common", and 8% did not know/did not answer.

Victim blaming attitudes are common in Romania. In a 2013 Romanian survey, 30.9% of respondents agreed with the assertion that "women are sometimes beaten due to their own fault". In the 2010 Eurobarometer survey, 58% of Romanians agreed that the "provocative behaviour of women" was a cause of violence against women.

In 2016, Romania ratified the Council of Europe Convention on preventing and combating violence against women and domestic violence (Istanbul Convention).

=== Theft ===
Pick-pocketing and stealing bags often take place in crowded areas, near exchange shops and hotels, on public transportation, in railway stations and inside airport terminals; and such acts are a very serious problem in Romania. A group of people (often including children - see section below) surround a person that appears wealthy, distract their attention, while one or more members of the group attempt to snatch money, watches or jewellery from pockets or from around the neck and wrist. Some thieves take advantage of the lack of attention of the victims and snatch bags and quickly run away. Tourists can also fall victims to thieves who present themselves as plain-clothes policemen, flash a badge and ask to see passports and wallets, after which they steal money from the wallet.

=== Crimes committed by children ===
Crimes committed by children peaked in the 1990s when the social context of the time (closing of many Romanian orphanages and economic insecurity due to the collapse of the planned communist economy after the Romanian Revolution) resulted in large numbers of street children. However, the situation has greatly improved since then. Nevertheless, there are still children and teenagers committing petty crimes on the streets and engaging in aggressive begging. According to the US Romania 2017 Crime & Safety Report: "Panhandlers -- often groups of teenagers -- can be aggressive and have resorted to grabbing/tearing clothing to distract and steal from their target (...) Organized groups of thieves and pickpockets (including very young children and well-dressed young adults) operate in train stations and on public transportation." Roma (Gypsy) children are the most vulnerable particularly to sex trafficking, pickpocketing, forced begging and forced stealing.

== Combating crime ==
=== Romanian Police ===
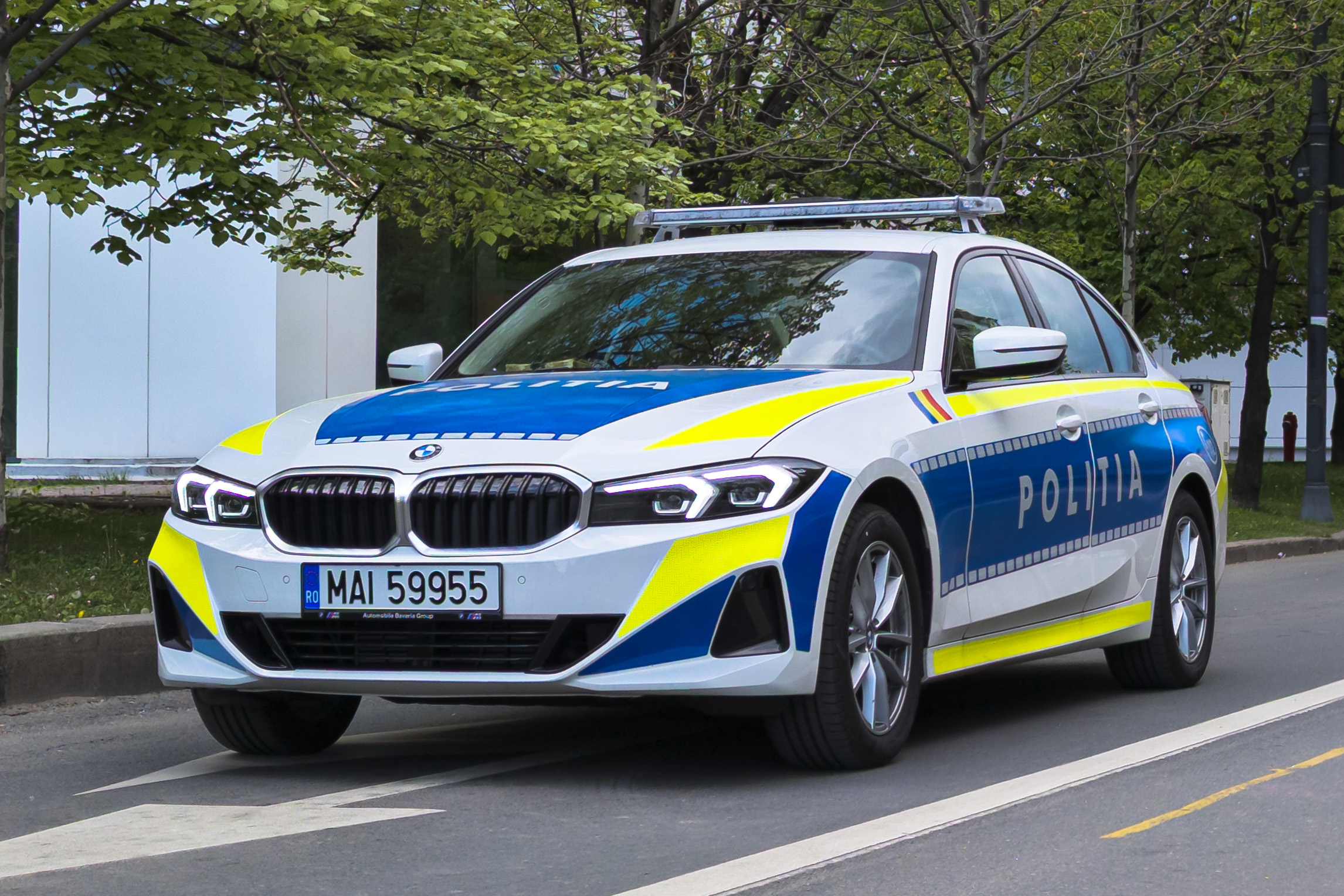
A car of the Romanian Police

The Romanian Police (Romanian: Poliția Română) is the national police force and main law enforcement agency in Romania. It is subordinated to the Ministry of Internal Affairs. During the communist era it was called miliția. Following the fall of communism, it has undergone numerous changes and reorganizations, the most important of which took place in 2002, when the police was demilitarized, becoming a civilian police force.

=== Gendarmerie ===
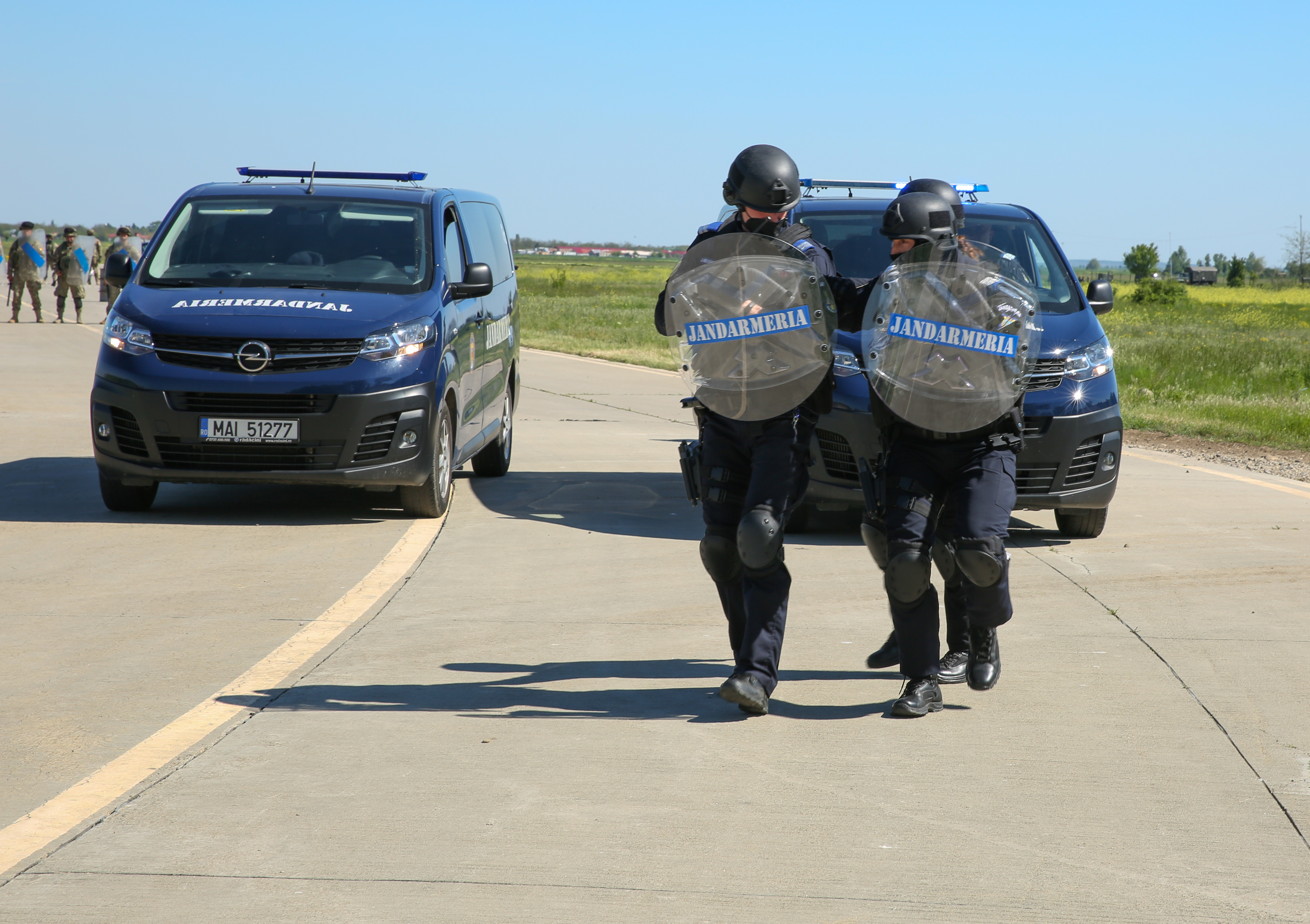
Romanian Gendarmerie during a training exercise

The Romanian Gendarmerie (Romanian: Jandarmeria Română) is a military police force of Romania tasked with high-risk and specialized law enforcement duties. It is one of the two main police forces in Romania (the other one being the Romanian Police), both having jurisdiction over the civilian population. Like the Romanian Police, the Gendarmerie is subordinated to the Ministry of Internal Affairs and does not have responsibility for policing the Romanian Armed Forces (this duty lies with the Military Police subordinated to the Romanian Land Forces).

== Reporting and investigating crime ==
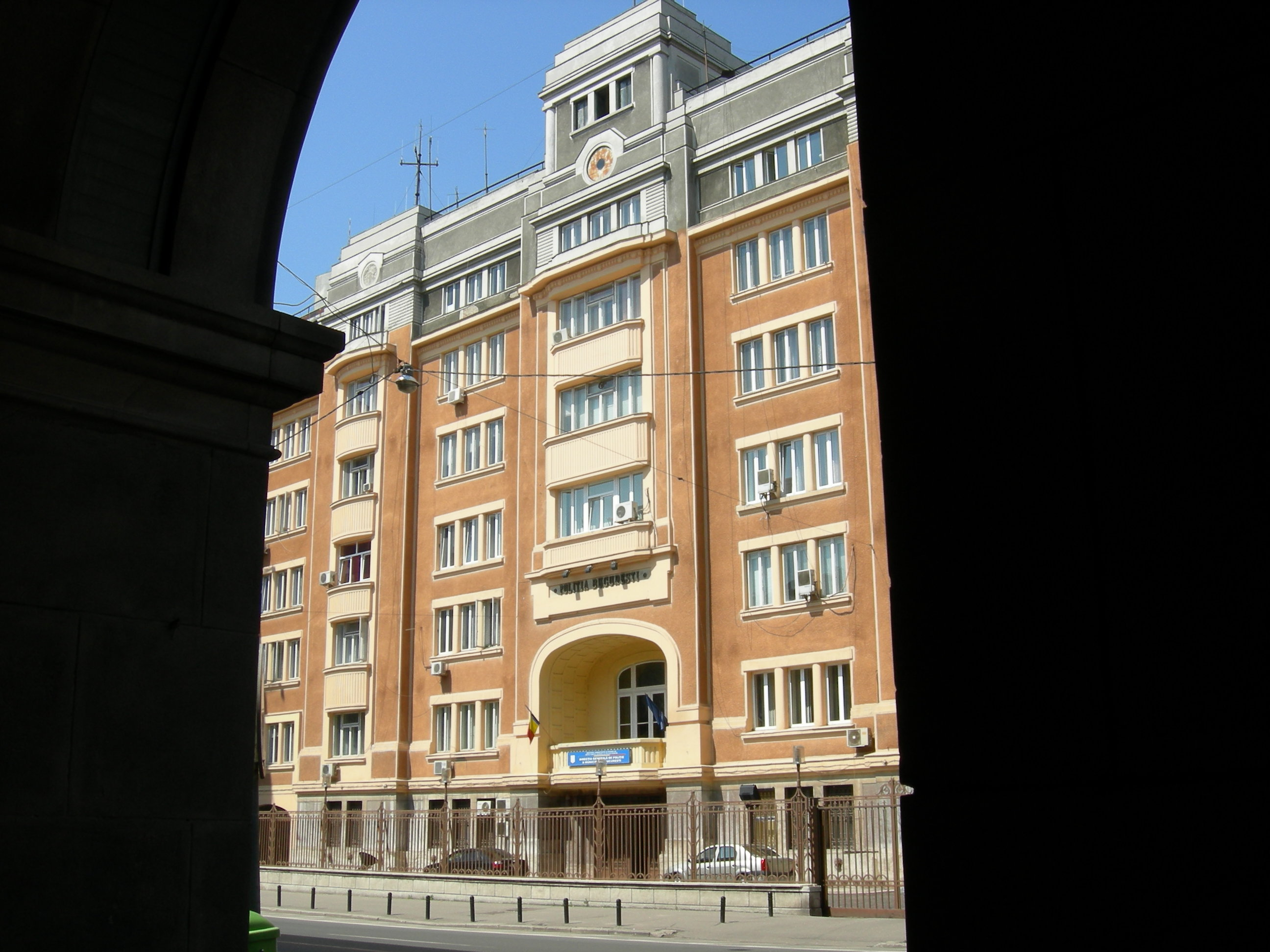
Police headquarters, Bucharest

According to the US Romania 2017 Crime & Safety Report: "Romanian police do have the capability to conduct complex criminal investigations but are heavily burdened with petty crimes". One crucial aspect of Romanian system of dealing with victims - at all levels of investigating and punishing crimes - is the "medico-legal certificate" (Romanian: certificat medico-legal) which is obtained from a medical doctor specialized in medical jurisprudence (Romanian: medic legist). It is also called "certificat de la IML". This certificate is used as proof for violent crimes.

Crime is prosecuted in accordance with the law. The current Romanian Penal Code came into effect on 1 February 2014. The current criminal code was preceded by The Penal Code of 1969 (in force from 1 January 1969), which in turn was preceded by The Penal Code of 1936.

The 1936 penal code was the first criminal code to apply nationwide, providing for the first time a unitary legislation on the territory of Romania, replacing the Hungarian Penal Code (known as The Csemegi Code) which had been in force in Transylvania since 1880, the Austrian Penal Code (promulgated under Emperor Franz Josef I) which had been in force in Bukovina since 1852, and the Penal Code of 1865 (known as The Cuza Code) which applied in the rest of the territory since 1865. When the communists came into power after World War II, they made several changes to the 1936 Code, in accordance with communist ideology, but the Code remained in force until January 1, 1969, when the new Ceaușescu Penal Code replaced it. Similarly, after the 1989 Revolution, many changes were made to the 1969 code, but the code remained in force until 1 February 2014, when it was replaced by the new criminal code.

== Historical crimes ==
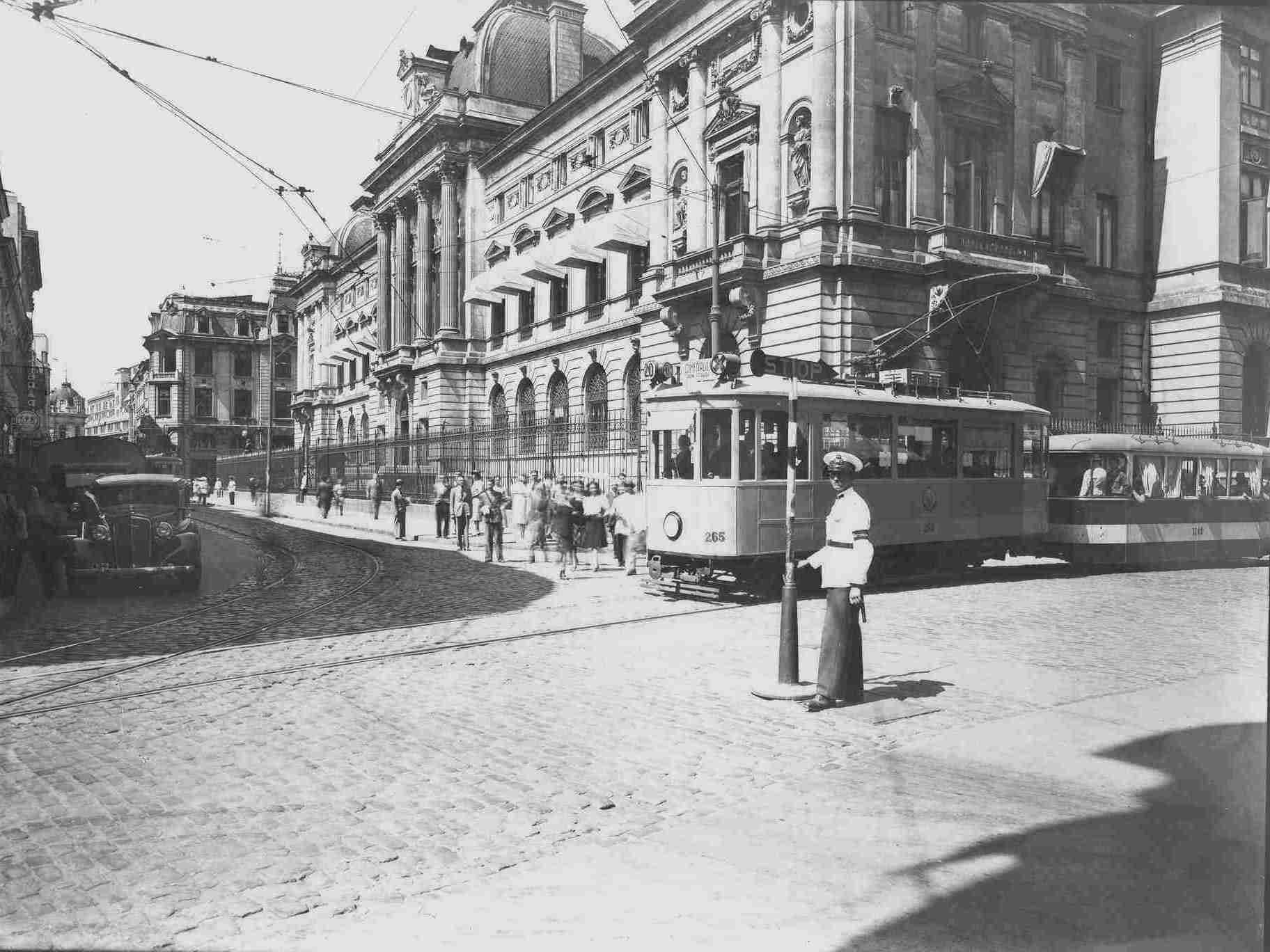
A policeman standing near a traffic sign, in the interwar era, in Bucharest

Perhaps the most notorious criminal in Romania was Ion Rîmaru, a serial killer who in 1970-1971 murdered and attacked several women in Bucharest. He was sentenced to death and executed in May 1971. In Transylvania, in the 1970s, Romulus Vereș, known as "the man with the hammer", murdered and attempted to murder several women; he was charged with five murders and several attempted murders, but was never imprisoned due to grounds of insanity having been diagnosed with schizophrenia, blaming the devil for his actions - instead, he was institutionalised in the Ștei psychiatric facility in 1976.

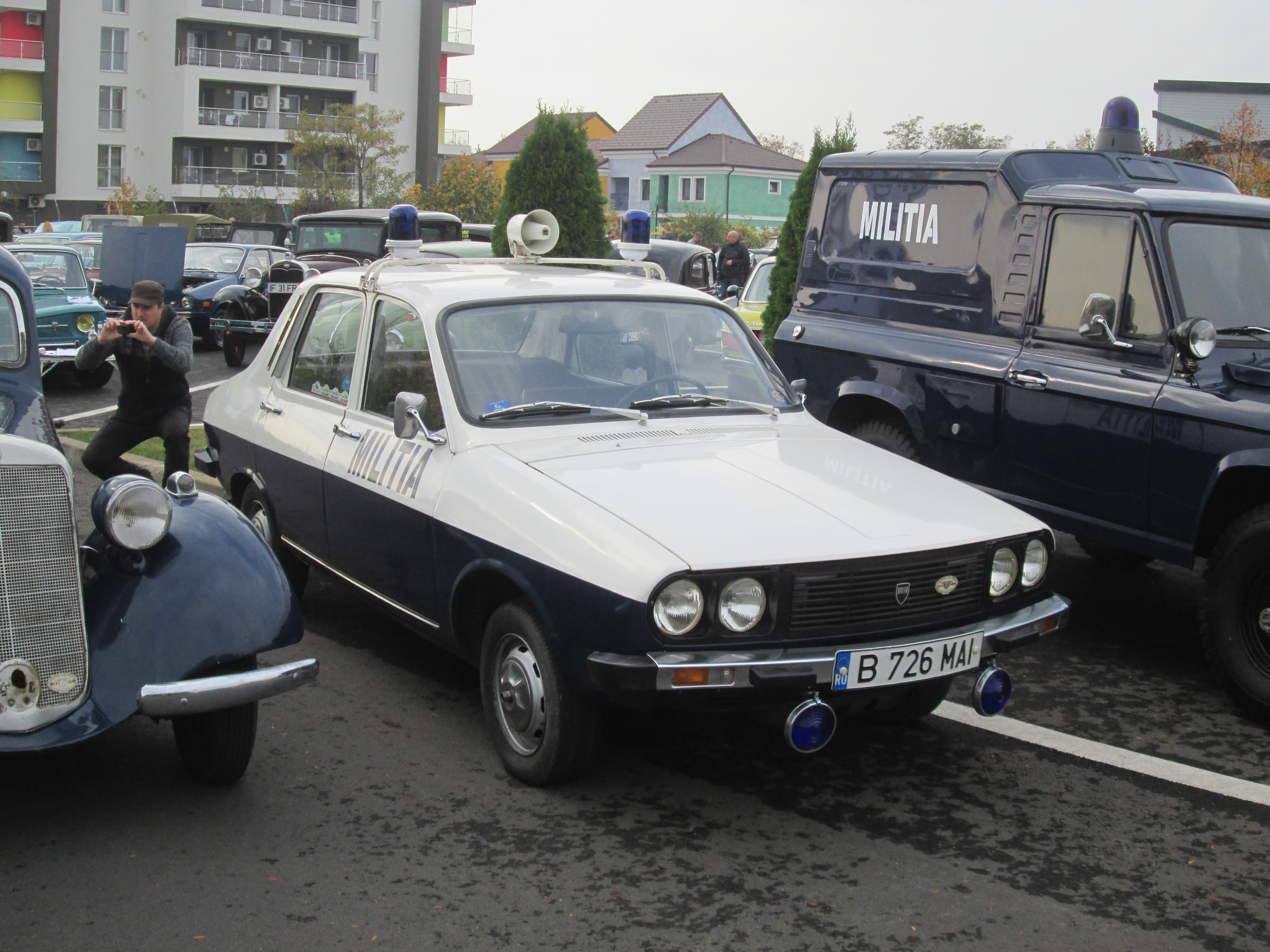
A Dacia 1310 militsiya car used in the 1980s, displayed at a 2018 show.

In 1977, in Bucharest, the Anca case (Cazul Anca) would later prove to be one of the worst miscarriages of justice of Romania. A taxi driver was forced, under torture inflicted on him by Miliția officers and prosecutors, to admit to a murder that he did not commit, after communist authorities ordered the case to be quickly solved. In 1981, the real murderer, Romca Cozmici, was caught: he admitted to the crime for which the taxi driver was convicted - a gruesome murder of an 18-year-old woman, and the dismembering of her body, and also admitted to a second similar murder. He was sentenced to death and executed.

== See also ==
- Human trafficking in Romania
- List of prisons in Romania
