= Stadionul Oțelul (Ștei) =

Romanian stadium

- Interactive map of Stadionul Oțelul
- Address: Aleea Stadionului
- Location: Ștei, Romania
- Coordinates: 46°32′15.3″N 22°28′3.7″E
- Owner: Transilvania GIE
- Capacity: 5,000 seated
- Surface: Grass

Construction
- Opened: 1980s
- Closed: 2010

Tenant
- Oțelul Ștei (1980–2010)

Stadionul Oțelul is a multi-purpose stadium in Ștei, Romania. It was used mostly for football matches, was the home ground of Oțelul Ștei and holds 5,000 people. The stadium was opened in the early 1980s, being built by the Mechanical Factory of Ștei, being one of the most expensive sports bases in the country, built in its own right by a state-owned company. The stadium had a covered main stand and next to the stadium, was built a modern sports hall. Both were the victims of a failed privatization and currently are in ruin, being totally neglected since 2010.
