= Câmpani =

Coordinates: 46°31′N 22°31′E

- Commune
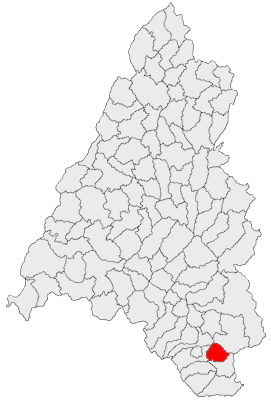
- Câmpani in Bihor County

- Location in Romania
- Coordinates
- Country: Romania
- County: Bihor

Government
  - Mayor (2020–2024): Victorica-Valentina Țoța (PSD)
- Area: 44.49 km^{2} (17.18 sq mi)
- Population (2011-10-31): 2,427
  - Density: 54.55/km^{2} (141.3/sq mi)
- Time zone: EET/EEST (UTC+2/+3)
- Vehicle reg.: BH

Câmpani (Hungarian: Felsőmezős) is a commune in Bihor County, Crișana, Romania. Its earliest attested documentation dates to 1600. It is situated in the southern part of the county, near the Apuseni Mountains, on the banks of the Băița River. Câmpani is situated at roughly equal distances to 3 towns: Nucet (5 km), Ștei (6 km), Vașcău (8 km), and 88 km from the county capital Oradea.

== Administration ==
The commune is composed of five villages: Câmpani, Fânațe (Fonóháza), Hârsești (Herzafalva), Sighiștel (Kisszegyesd) and Valea de Sus (Felsőfeketevölgy).

The central village itself is divided into Câmpani de Jos (Lower Câmpani) and Câmpani de Sus (Upper Câmpani); these names are received from where the houses are situated, on the upper or lower course of the river. From the administrative point of view, there is only commune. In the past there were two villages. Now the only difference is that there are 2 bus stops, one in every part. Theoretically there is only one street in the commune, the Main street, most of which is situated along the DN 75 road. However, there are some streets not connected to the road, that received name from the inhabitants, two of which are Mierăști and Hânicău.

== Education ==
Câmpani has 6 kindergartens, 6 elementary schools and one secondary school. All schools underwent rehabilitation in the past years and they are now very modern. The local council provides a bus and a bus driver, which picks up the children from home and takes them to school every morning. Most of the highschool students study in Ștei, a nearby town which has two highschools. Special buses are set on the route for their departure and arrival with the fees supported by the government.

== Institutions ==
The commune contains several institutions:

- 5 Orthodox churches
- 2 Protestant churches
- Town hall
- Pharmacy
- Police department
- Small hospital
- Primary and secondary schools
- Community centres

There are further plans for building a village museum.

== Economy ==
The commune does not have any large or midsized business open. Besides few grocery shops and some bars some wood production units are available. While in the past, most of the inhabitants worked at the uranium mine in Băița or at the local factory (uzină) in Ștei. Today most of them work at the European Drinks or European Food factories in Rieni, Sudrigiu or Ștei. Agriculture was an important branch of the economy in the past, but nowadays the trend had fallen. Every house had a microfarm, with at least 2 cows, 2 pigs, 20 chicken and 1 horse. Nowadays most still own 1 or 2 pigs and some chicken; but there are some that make money from agriculture owning larger farms with 10 cows and many pigs. Some of them are shepherds with tens of sheep per herd.

== Tourism ==
The Natural Reservation of the Sighiștel Valley is a major tourist attraction, the valley having a beautiful and wild canyon and numerous caves. In each summer you can find tens of tourists camping there, with tents.

Another tourist attraction is the old wooden church in Fânațe, which is more than 300 years old.

== Sister commune ==
Câmpani has a sister commune in France: Saint-Jean-en-Royans. Every year French come to Câmpani or Romanians go to France. An organisation “Europrietenia” (Eurofriendship) is dealing with the departures, being funded by its members and by the European Union.
