= Domestic violence in Romania =

Domestic violence in Romania constitutes a social issue.

Domestic violence (DV) in the country was largely ignored during the Communist era, and development has been slow during the transition period in the 1990s, but it has started to be addressed, socially and legally, in the 21st century. In 2016, Romania ratified the Council of Europe Convention on preventing and combating violence against women and domestic violence (Istanbul Convention).

About 76% to 80% of reported victims are women, while men account for only 20% to 24%, they are far less likely to report domestic abuse and they can face severe domestic abuse at home.

== History ==
Before 1990, DV was not treated as a social issue. Public awareness of the problem of DV is a relatively recent development, which stated to develop in the mid-1990s, with the most prominent issue at that time being that of child abandonment.

The Penal Code was amended by Law no. 197/2000 creating sanctions for persons who perpetrate acts of violence against family members; and stipulating that in case of the rape of a family member, the punishment is harsher. Since the law acknowledged that rape can be committed by a family member, with a family member being defined as including a spouse, this had the effect to criminalize marital rape. Other important changes that were made to the rape law were the removal of the stipulation that a perpetrator could escape punishment if, after the rape, he married the victim.

Law no. 217/2003 on the prevention of family violence was Romania's first specific law dealing with DV. This law was substantially amended in 2012.

The current 2012 DV law brought important new changes, especially in regard to protection orders. This law describes seven types of DV:

a) verbal violence (aggressive language, insults, threats, humiliation)

b) psychological violence (includes controlling behavior, provoking psychological harm and tensions on the victim, endangering animals, destroying property, threats, displaying weapons, excessive jealousy, and other controlling behaviors)

c) physical violence (several acts are described by the law, including hitting, punching, poisoning)

d) sexual violence (coercion and harassment into sexual activity, including marital rape. Marital rape, in Romanian viol conjugal, is explicitly listed as sexual violence)

e) economic violence (includes the prohibition of working outside the home, depriving family members of food or clothes, as well as forced child labor of a minor child)

f) social violence (includes isolating the victim, forbidding them to see family or friends, it also includes stopping family members from attending school)

g) spiritual violence (stopping family members from pursuing cultural, ethic or religious interests, or forcing them to pursue certain beliefs/spiritual practices)

== Current situation ==
In Romania, 800 people were killed in DV incidents between 2004 and 2011. The laws on DV are not strictly enforced - one year after the 2012 law, there had been 1009 files for protection orders; only 23% ended in criminal proceedings as they were supposed to.

== Social views ==
In the 2010 Eurobarometer poll on violence against women, 39% of Romanian respondents said that they thought DV in their country was "very common", 45% "fairly common", 8% "not very common", 0% "not at all common", and 8% did not know/did not answer. Victim blaming attitudes are common in Romania. In a 2013 Romanian survey, 30.9% of respondents agreed with the assertion that "women are sometimes beaten due to their own fault". In the 2010 Eurobarometer survey, 58% of Romanians agreed that the "provocative behaviour of women" was a cause of violence against women.

== See also ==
- Crime in Romania
