= Sighiștel =

- Location within Romania

Location
- Country: Romania
- Counties: Bihor County

Physical characteristics
- Source: Mount Pietrele Negre
  - location: Bihor Mountains
  - coordinates: 46°30′49″N 22°37′11″E
  - elevation: 1,062 m (3,484 ft)
- Mouth: Crișul Băița
  - location: Ștei
  - coordinates: 46°32′29″N 22°27′33″E
  - elevation: 248 m (814 ft)
- Length: 15.7 km (9.8 mi)
- Basin size: 25 km^{2} (9.7 sq mi)

Basin features
- Progression: Crișul Băița→ Crișul Negru→ Körös→ Tisza→ Danube→ Black Sea

The Sighiștel is a right tributary of the river Crișul Băița in Romania. It flows into the Crișul Băița in Ștei. Its length is 15.7 km (9.8 mi) and its basin size is 25 km^{2} (9.7 sq mi).
