= Grațianite =

General
- Category: sulfide
- Formula: MnBi_{2}S_{4}
- IMA symbol: Gți
- Strunz classification: 2.HA.20
- Crystal system: monoclinic
- Crystal class: 2/m prismatic
- Space group: C2/m
- Unit cell: a = 12.677(3) Å, b = 3.9140(8) Å, c = 14.758(3) Å β = 115.31(3)°

Identification
- Color: grey
- Luster: metallic
- Diaphaneity: opaque
- Density: 6.031 (measured) g/cm^{3}
- Solubility: insoluble

Grațianite is a mineral with the chemical formula MnBi_{2}S_{4} and the IMA symbol Gți.

It was first identified in 2014, being found in Băița in Bihor County, Romania.

It is being investigated as having applications in energy-efficient data storage.
