= Nucet =

- Town
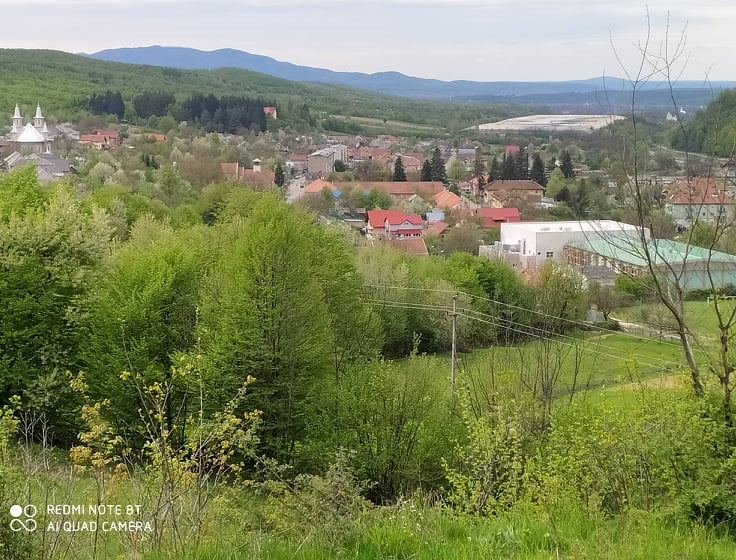
- View of Nucet from a hill

- Coat of arms

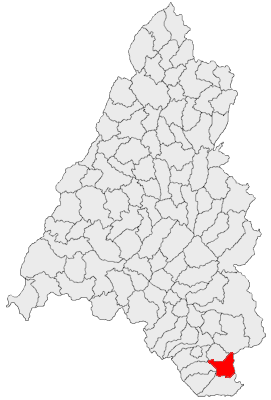
- Location within Bihor County

- Location in Romania
- Coordinates: 46°29′3″N 22°33′41″E
- Country: Romania
- County: Bihor

Government
  - Mayor (2024–2028): Dănuț Lazea (PNL)
- Area: 41.11 km^{2} (15.87 sq mi)
- Elevation: 410 m (1,350 ft)
- Population (2021-12-01): 1,987
  - Density: 48.33/km^{2} (125.2/sq mi)
- Time zone: UTC+02:00 (EET)
  - Summer (DST): UTC+03:00 (EEST)
- Postal code: 415400
- Area code: (+40) 02 59
- Vehicle reg.: BH
- Website: primarianucet.ro

Nucet (Romanian pronunciation: [nuˈtʃet]; Hungarian: Diófás) is a town in Bihor County, western Transylvania, Romania. Its name means "walnut trees" both in Romanian and Hungarian. It administers two villages, Băița (Rézbánya) and Băița-Plai.

== Geography ==
The town is situated at an altitude of 410 m (1,350 ft), on the banks of the river Crișul Băița. It lies in the western foothills of the Bihor Mountains, at the edge of the Apuseni Natural Park. It is located at the southern extremity of Bihor County, 90 km (56 mi) southeast of the county seat, Oradea, on the border with Alba County. Nucet is crossed by national road DN75, which starts near Ștei, 10 km (6.2 mi) to the northwest, and runs to Câmpeni (the capital of Țara Moților), 62 km (39 mi) to the southeast, and on to Turda, where it joins DN1.

The uranium-producing Băița mine is located on the territory of Nucet.

== Demographics ==
Historical population
Year	Pop.	±%
1880	807	—
1890	785	−2.7%
1900	902	+14.9%
1910	689	−23.6%
1920	644	−6.5%
1930	779	+21.0%
1941	772	−0.9%
1956	9,879	+1179.7%
1966	2,768	−72.0%
1977	2,345	−15.3%
1992	2,531	+7.9%
2002	2,851	+12.6%
2011	2,148	−24.7%
2021	1,987	−7.5%
Source: Census data

Nucet is the smallest town in Bihor County and the second smallest town in Romania; only Băile Tușnad is smaller than Nucet. At the 2011 census, it had a population of 2,148, made up of Romanians (89.57%), Hungarians (3.44%), Roma (3.77%), and Germans (0.27%). At the 2021 census, the town had a population of 1,987; of those, 89.03% were Romanians and 3.72% Roma.

== See also ==
- Grațianite
