= Velo Vercors =

Coordinates: 45.013869°N 5.288141°E

Velo Vercors is a French cycling holiday company that offers self-catered routes, B&Bs, bike hires, and guided or independent routes. Based in the town of Saint-Jean-en-Royans in the south of France, it is within the Vercors Regional Natural Park.

== Awards ==
In June 2010 it was featured as one of the "50 best Activity Holidays" in the Sunday Times. On 14 March 2010, it won "Featured Holiday" in the Irish Independent, and on 14 February 2010, it won "Company of the Week" in the Sunday Independent's Tips and Deals section. It was also recommended by The Guardian on 29 June 2011.
