= Kamelia (Romanian singer) =

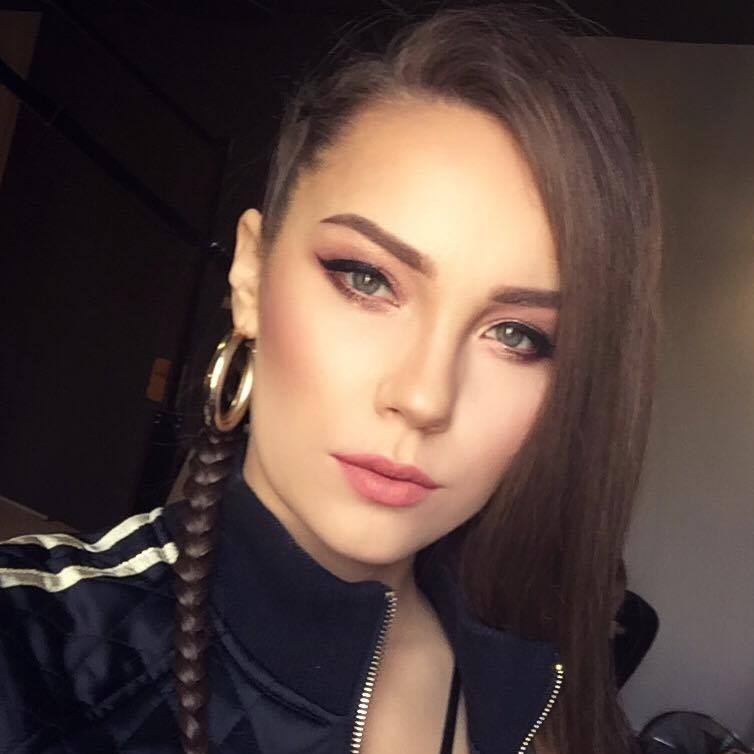

Background information
- Born: 5 September 1986 (age 39); Ștei, Bihor County, Romania
- Genres: Pop, reggaeton, dance
- Occupations: Singer, songwriter
- Years active: 2000–present

Camelia Adina Hora (born 5 September 1986), also known as Kamelia, is a Romanian pop-dance singer and songwriter.

== Career ==
Born in Ștei and raised in Timișoara, she started to sing when she was 14 years old and had a band called D.G.TAL, with her brother, the composer and producer George Hora, with whom she owns a music studio (Studio 66).

Kamelia participated at the Megastar contest (2006–2007), and took part in one of the tours of the Romanian band Simplu.

Kamelia became widely known in Romania after a collaboration with the rapper Puya and George Hora. In 2009, the song "Change" reached position 19 among top 100 most rotated songs in Romania, and in 2010 the same song reached position 48. In the same year, 2010, song "V.I.P." in collaboration with Puya reached position 21.

In 2014, Kamelia was present in top 100 most rotated songs in Romania, on position 30 with the song "Piesa mea preferată" feat. Vescan. After that, in 2013, with the same song they reached position 77.

In 2014 Kamelia was nominated as one of 'top 100 sexiest women of the year in Romania' by FHM, where she ranked on position 12. In August 2014, Kamelia was nominated for Fans Like Award at Media Music Awards.

Between 2010 and 2017 Kamelia released several songs that became a real success, including "Change", "V.I.P.", "Come again", "Prima oara", "Vara rece", "Piesa mea preferata", "Amor".

== Discography ==
Singles

- 2009: "Change" (feat. Puya & George Hora)
- 2010: "VIP" (feat. Puya)
- 2010: "Dreamin'"
- 2011: "Come again"
- 2011: "Prima oara"
- 2012: "U can do it" (vs. Dj Asher & ScreeN)
- 2012: "I don't care"
- 2012: "Break it down"
- 2012: "Vara rece"
- 2012: "Voltaj-Lumea e a mea" (feat. Kamelia)
- 2012: "Am invatat" (feat. Voxis)
- 2012: "Trecem peste" (feat. Blazon)
- 2012: "Ai aparut" (feat. George Hora)
- 2013: "Piesa mea preferata" (feat. Vescan)
- 2013: "Bolnav cu Muzica" (feat. Alan & Kepa)
- 2014: "Film de iubire" (feat. Stres)
- 2014: "Ramas bun" (feat. Andrew & Blazon)
- 2014: "Inima ta" (feat. Junior High)
- 2014: "Never Let You Go" (feat. Voxlight)
- 2014: "Te rog"
- 2015: "Stiu ca esti al meu"
- 2015: "Dependentza" (feat. Bitza)
- 2015: "Piesa noastra" (feat. Colin)
- 2015: "Amor"
- 2016: "Imi voi aminti" (feat. Bibanu MixXL)
- 2017: "Suave"
