= Saint-Jean-en-Royans =

- Commune
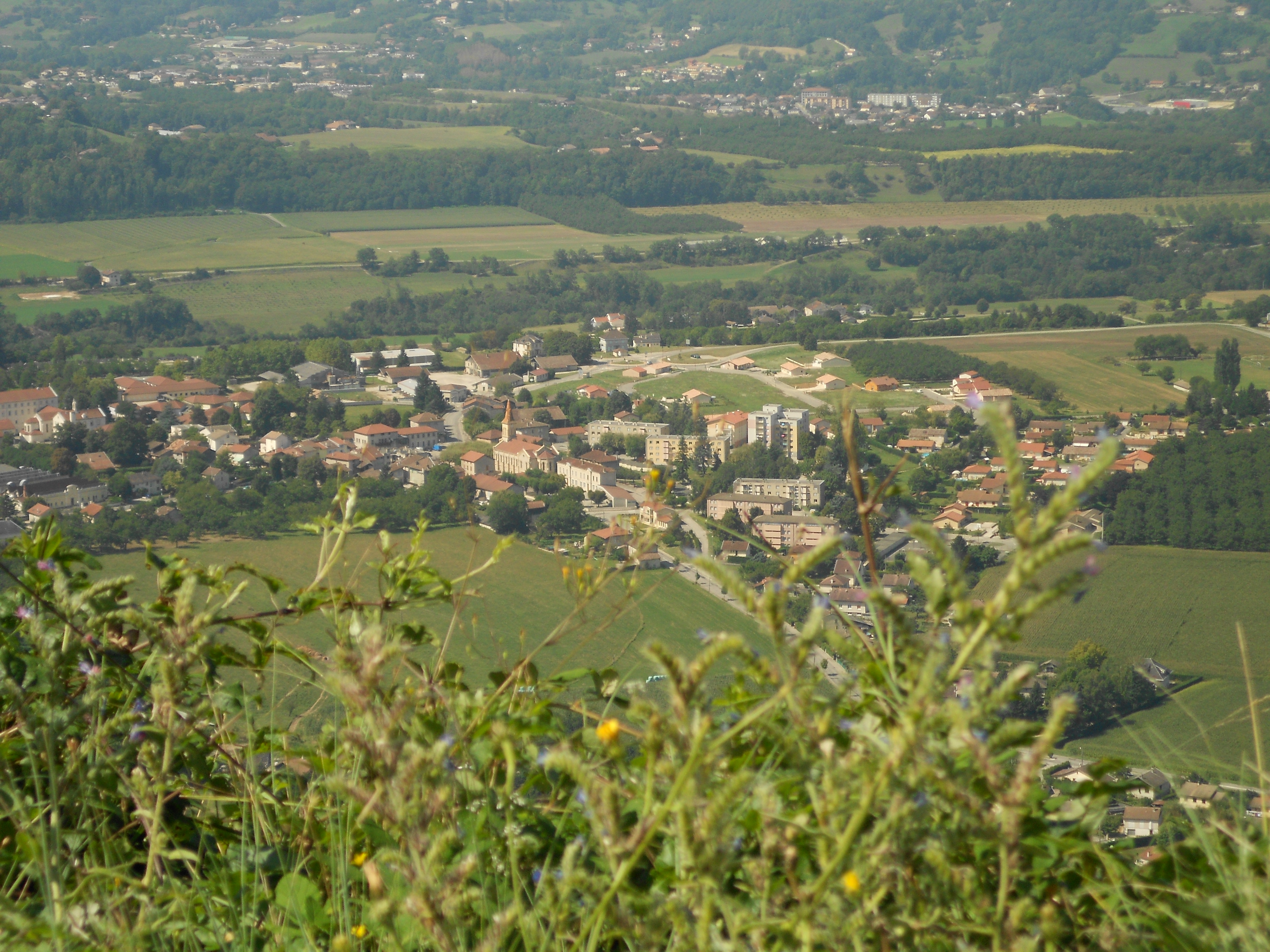
- Saint-Jean-en-Royans seen from the east

- Coat of arms
- Location of Saint-Jean-en-Royans
- Location within France Location within Auvergne-Rhône-Alpes
- Coordinates: 45°01′10″N 5°17′35″E
- Country: France
- Region: Auvergne-Rhône-Alpes
- Department: Drôme
- Arrondissement: Die
- Canton: Vercors-Monts du Matin
- Intercommunality: Royans-Vercors

Government
  - Mayor (2020–2026): Christian Morin
- Area^{1}: 27.86 km^{2} (10.76 sq mi)
- Elevation: 255 m (837 ft)
- Highest elevation: 1,292 m (4,239 ft)
- Lowest elevation: 196 m (643 ft)
- Population (2023): 2,874
  - Density: 103.2/km^{2} (267.2/sq mi)
- Time zone: UTC+01:00 (CET)
  - Summer (DST): UTC+02:00 (CEST)
- INSEE/Postal code: 26307 /26190
- ^{1} French Land Register data, which excludes lakes, ponds, glaciers > 1 km^{2} (0.386 sq mi or 247 acres) and river estuaries.

Saint-Jean-en-Royans (French pronunciation: [sɛ̃ ʒɑ̃ ɑ̃ ʁwajɑ̃]; Vivaro-Alpine: Sant Joan de Roians) is a commune in the Drôme department in southeastern France.

== Population ==
Historical population

Year	Pop.	±% p.a.
1793	2,232	—
1800	2,008	−1.50%
1806	2,525	+3.89%
1821	2,555	+0.08%
1831	2,710	+0.59%
1836	2,541	−1.28%
1841	2,516	−0.20%
1846	2,629	+0.88%
1851	2,661	+0.24%
1856	2,721	+0.45%
1861	2,563	−1.19%
1866	2,742	+1.36%
1872	2,788	+0.28%
1876	2,546	−2.24%
1881	2,689	+1.10%
1886	2,815	+0.92%
1891	2,965	+1.04%
1896	2,888	−0.52%
1901	2,959	+0.49%

Year	Pop.	±% p.a.
1906	2,858	−0.69%
1911	2,800	−0.41%
1921	2,470	−1.25%
1926	2,769	+2.31%
1931	2,814	+0.32%
1936	2,649	−1.20%
1946	2,775	+0.47%
1954	2,705	−0.32%
1962	2,849	+0.65%
1968	2,897	+0.28%
1975	2,708	−0.96%
1982	2,945	+1.21%
1990	2,895	−0.21%
1999	2,895	+0.00%
2007	3,011	+0.49%
2012	2,953	−0.39%
2017	2,868	−0.58%
2023	2,874	+0.03%

Source: EHESS and INSEE (1968-2023)

== International relations ==
Saint-Jean-en-Royans is twinned with:

- Câmpani, Romania
- Roccagorga, Italy

== See also ==
- Communes of the Drôme department
- Parc naturel régional du Vercors
- Velo Vercors
