= European Drinks & Foods =

Romanian food production company

- Company type: Private
- Industry: Food processing
- Founded: 1993; 33 years ago
- Headquarters: Ştei, Romania
- Area served: Worldwide
- Key people: Ioan Micula (CEO); Viorel Micula (CEO)
- Products: crop and livestock, food and beverages
- Revenue: ▲€ 340 million (2015)
- Number of employees: 4,500 (2015)
- Website: http://www.europeandrinks.ro/

European Drinks & Foods is one of the largest Romanian food companies located in Ştei, Bihor County. The holding is formed by several companies including European Drinks, European Foods, Scandic Distilleries, Rieni Drinks and Transilvania General Import Export and is specialised in producing food and drink products.

The company produces a wide variety of products like carbonated water, mineral water, energy drink, beer and various soft drinks through its European Drinks division. Two of the company's soft drinks Adria and Frutti Fresh are the main competitors for the Coca-Cola and Pepsi brands on the Romanian market. Other successful brands include the Izvorul Minunilor mineral water and the Bürger beer.

European Drinks & Foods also owns an agribusiness division Westgrain which owns nearly 8,700 ha of arable land in the Bihor County located in north-western Romania. In 2011 Westgrain sold a grain silo with a 44,000 tonne capacity located on the Danube river near Drobeta-Turnu Severin, Mehedinți County, Romania to the US based trading giant Cargill for an undisclosed fee.
