= Băița mine =

Uranium mine in Romania

- Location in Romania

Location
- Location: Nucet, Bihor County, Romania; 46°28′48″N 22°37′42″E

Production
- Products: Uranium
- Production: 0.1 tonnes of uranium
- Financial year: 2008

History
- Opened: 1955

Owner
- Company: CNU

The Băița mine is a large open pit mine in the northwest of Romania in Bihor County, close to Ștei, 123 km (76 mi) southeast of Oradea and 737 km (458 mi) northwest of the capital, Bucharest. Băița represents the largest uranium reserve in Romania having estimated reserves of 90 million tonnes of ore grading 0.5% uranium metal.

The Băița mine uranium reserve represents the largest surface uranium deposit in the world.

== History ==
Sovromcuarț was a SovRom (a Soviet-Romanian joint venture established on Romanian territory during the Soviet occupation of Romania) which started its operations in 1950 at the Băița mine, under a name that was meant to conceal the true object of its activity. Its initial workforce consisted of 15,000 political prisoners; after most of them died of radiation poisoning, they were replaced by local villagers, who were completely unaware of the fact that they were working with radioactive material. Almost two thousand miners were working day and night, in four shifts; there was no concern for labor safety or environmental protection.
