= Romulus Vereș =

Romanian serial killer

- Born: Romulus Vereș; 23 January 1929; Cluj, Romania
- Died: 13 December 1993 (aged 64); Ștei, Romania
- Other name: The Man with the Hammer
- Conviction: Murder
- Penalty: Not guilty by reason of insanity

Details
- Victims: 5
- Span of crimes: 11 September 1972 – 14 February 1974
- Country: Romania
- Date apprehended: 14 February 1974

Romulus Vereș (23 January 1929 in Cluj – 13 December 1993 in Ștei) was a notorious serial killer from Romania, known as "The Man with the Hammer".

During the 1970s, he was charged with five murders and several attempted murders, but never imprisoned on grounds of insanity; he had schizophrenia, blaming the Devil for his actions. Instead, he was institutionalised in the Ștei psychiatric facility in 1976, following a three-year-long forensic investigation during which four thousand people were questioned.

Urban myths brought the number of victims up to 200 women, but the actual number was much smaller. This confusion probably is explained by the lack of attention this case received, despite its magnitude, in the Communist press of the time.

== Before Murders ==
Romulus Vereș was born on 23 January 1929. He worked as a locomotive mechanic and got married at 19 years old to his first wife, which whom he had a son. They divorced after 6 years, and he remarried immediately after. His second marriage lasted 4 years, with his second wife later accusing him of verbal abuse and physical abuse.

== Murders ==
Between 1972 and 1974, he attacked 8 women and girls, of whom 3 died, and was convicted only of 5. He attacked victims by hitting them with a hammer, iron bar or anything similar. He didn't have a clear Modus Operandi, as some victims were attacked in public and some in their own home, some victims were raped, and he also stole some valuable items from some victims.

Chronologically, his victims were:

- Cornelia Vaida, 25, killed and thrown in a river on the night of 11 September 1972.
- Ibolya Covaci, 15, attacked in her own house on 7 October 1972, survived.
- Maria Mărgineanu, 35, attacked in her own house while pregnant on 16 October 1972, survived
- Ana Valentina Florea, 8, attacked in her own house and raped on 5 December 1972, survived.
- Ana Biro, 48, attacked in a store on 12 December 1972, survived.
- Ileana Olteanu, 46, attacked in an apartment complex on 12 December 1972, survived.
- Aurelia Ciulea, 16, killed and raped in her own home on 16 December 1972
- Ilona Szilagy, 68, killed on 14 January 1974.

== Arrest and Conviction ==
He was arrested on 26 February 1974, 12 days after he killed his last victim. While in custody, he claimed to be controlled by two devils, which he called Bere (Romanian word for beer) and Puiu (Romanian word for chicken). Doctors noted he was an extremely dangerous criminal, as he couldn't remember when he attacked or killed his victims, and he was convicted to life in a mental institution, dying there on 13 December 1993.

== See also ==
- List of serial killers by country
