= Ion Rîmaru =

Romanian serial killer

- Born: Ion Rîmaru; 12 October 1946; Corabia, Kingdom of Romania
- Died: 23 October 1971 (aged 25); Jilava Prison, Socialist Republic of Romania
- Resting place: Unmarked grave in Jilava Prison
- Other names: The Vampire of Bucharest; The Wolf-Man
- Convictions: Aggravated murder (4 counts), Theft (1 count)
- Penalty: Execution by firing squad

Details
- Victims: 4 (confirmed), 10+ (suspected)
- Span of crimes: 8 April 1970 – 4 May 1971
- Country: Romania
- State: Bucharest
- Date apprehended: 27 May 1971

Ion Rîmaru ([iˈon rɨˈmaru]; modern spelling Râmaru; 12 October 1946 – 23 October 1971) was an infamous Romanian serial killer, serial raptist, and necrophile, who was popularly known as the Vampire of Bucharest (Vampirul din București) or the Blondes' Killer (criminalul blondelor). Rîmaru terrorized Bucharest between 1970 and 1971, killing four women and attacking more than ten others. Authorities had made over 2,500 arrests before his capture. The women were attacked with an axe, bitten on their breasts and thighs, and raped after they were already dead.

== Biography ==
=== Early life ===
Ion Rîmaru was the oldest of three boys born to parents who married in Caracal. His parents argued almost daily; the couple eventually separated and his father, Florea, moved to Bucharest, taking a job as a night tram driver. After his death years later, Florea himself was discovered to have been a serial killer.

Rîmaru performed poorly academically and was forced to repeat the ninth grade. From adolescence, he exhibited an uncontrollable libido and caused a public scandal in his hometown when he was found to be having a sexual relationship with the underage daughter of his teacher. At age 18, he was convicted of aggravated theft. Nevertheless, during high school, Rîmaru always received a perfect grade in conduct.

=== Education ===
Rîmaru entered the Faculty of Veterinary Medicine in 1966 with a grade of 5.33 (out of 10). He repeated his second year there. At the time of his arrest, Rîmaru was in the course of repeating his third year.

Although he had entered a university, one of Rîmaru's professors described him as shy and semi-literate, with a very poor vocabulary and an extremely narrow range of interests. His roommates reported that he behaved strangely, so they avoided him. When he became enraged, Rîmaru would harm himself; he was found to have over twenty cuts on his arms and legs. A university classmate reported that one night, at the dormitory, Rîmaru did not sleep but instead prowled outside a room where he knew a girl had come to visit a classmate. Doctors diagnosed him with esophageal spasm, reactive nervous syndrome and mental problems in 1967.

=== Crimes ===
In late 1970 and early 1971, Bucharest was shaken by a series of crimes committed by an unknown individual who would use a hammer, a small axe, and an iron bar or a knife to attack restaurant waitresses who were alone and returning from work. He struck after midnight during unusual weather conditions such as snowstorms, driving rain, high winds, freezing cold or fog. Many women would not go outside after 9:00 pm except in large groups or with men. Their terror was heightened by the police's reluctance to release details, leading to wildly exaggerated rumours. The country's police force, which was at the time the Miliția, eventually realized that they were dealing with a serial killer; a yearlong investigation, with the help of victims who had survived, led to Rîmaru's arrest on 27 May 1971.

However, the clue which led directly to Rîmaru's arrest was a medical diagnosis sheet. On 4 March 1971, a group of six doctors found that he had "suspected periodic epilepsy"; the doctors' note was found beneath the body of Mihaela Ursu, whom he murdered in an especially brutal fashion two months later. Between her fingers, she had strands of his hair that were used to identify him (some have suggested that he went to the doctors to eventually be able to claim insanity at trial). Because the note was wet and bloody, only the letterhead from the Bucharest Students' Hospital was visible.

At this point the criminal began acting more randomly, not attacking waitresses exclusively and even going after two women who were together. On 15 May specialists determined that the note had been produced in Octavian Ieniște's office in March 1971. He had seen 83 students that month, of whom 15, including Rîmaru, had not deposited their diagnoses with university officials. The Miliția closely monitored each suspect and three officers went to his dormitory on 27 May; he was not home but while they searched his room he came back at 1:00 pm. In his sack he had an axe and a knife; tests on the hair and bite marks he left and the testimony of witnesses left no reasonable doubt as to his guilt.

The 16 gravest offences of which Rîmaru was convicted are, chronologically:

- 8/9 April 1970 – Elena Oprea – premeditated murder (not raped because a neighbour scared him away)
- 1/2 June 1970 – Florica Marcu – rape (knocked unconscious in front of her house, carried to Sfânta Vineri cemetery, pushed hard off the fence there, raped, stabbed and had her blood sucked while walking home with him, saved by a truck driver)
- 19/20 July 1970 – OCL Confecția store – theft of public property
- 24 July 1970 – Margareta Hanganu – aggravated theft
- 22/23 November 1970 – Olga Bărăitaru – aggravated attempted murder, rape and aggravated theft
- 15/16 February 1971 – Gheorghița Sfetcu – aggravated attempted murder and aggravated theft
- 17/18 February 1971 – Elisabeta Florea – aggravated attempted murder
- 4/5 March 1971 – Fănica Ilie – aggravated premeditated murder, rape and aggravated theft
- 8/9 April 1971 – Gheorghița Popa – aggravated murder, rape and aggravated theft (48 stab wounds to the head, chest, groin and legs, five blows to the head, ribs crushed by stomping, genitalia bitten out)
- 1/2 May 1971 – Stana Saracin – attempted rape
- 4/5 May 1971 – Mihaela Ursu – aggravated murder, rape (he was interrupted in the act and left unsatisfied, leading him to seek a new victim)
- 4/5 May 1971 – Maria Iordache – aggravated attempted murder (attacked two hours after Ursu; escaped when he dropped the metal bar with which he was beating her while she was running)
- 6/7 May 1971 – Viorica Tatu – aggravated attempted murder
- 6/7 May 1971 – Elena Buluci – aggravated attempted murder
- May 1971 – Iuliana Funzinschi – aggravated theft of public property and aggravated theft of private property.

After the murder of Popa, a waitress, the authorities went on high alert, launching "Operation Vulture", named after the street where she had been murdered. 6,000 men from various law-enforcement agencies patrolled the streets of Bucharest each night, as well as 100 cars and 40 motorcycles. Medical personnel, night bus and tram operators, hotel and bar employees – all were mobilized, not to mention great numbers of Miliția, Securitate, and Interior Ministry staff. 2,565 arrests were made and over 8,000 individuals were asked for identification, but Rîmaru would commit one more murder and attempt to commit several more before being arrested.

Authorities rated Rîmaru's modus operandi as ferocious and cruel, based on his propensity for cutting off clothes, biting off flesh, dragging his victims, and hacking away at them with his weapons, also raping them while they were unconscious. Rîmaru was judged to be aggressive, impulsive and sadistic. He showed signs of vampirism; for instance, he poked several holes into the flesh of Florica Marcu, who later related how he sucked blood out of them. Cannibalism was also present; he would bite off women's vaginas, pubic areas and breasts, and the missing pieces of flesh were no longer found at the crime scenes. Additionally, he had necrophiliac tendencies, continuing his rapes after his victims had died and also beating and stabbing their corpses.

=== Investigation, trial and execution ===
After his arrest, Rîmaru remained completely silent, staring expressionlessly into space. The investigators went into an office to decide on a plan; they introduced a Miliția officer who pretended to be a thief into his cell and got him to talk.

After two months of interrogations, Rîmaru admitted to 23 very serious crimes. In fact, he had been arrested for only three murders; the rest (another murder, six attempted murders, five rapes, one attempted rape, and seven thefts of various degrees) he or his father confessed to. On one hand, he tried to convince the authorities that he was not responsible on the grounds of insanity, and that he did not realize the women would die; on the other hand, he insisted he was guilty, asking to be taken to the scenes of his crimes. During police lineups, victims brought in to identify him would tremble when their eyes met his, despite there being no danger to them now. Allegedly, for the public at large, Rîmaru's name itself inspired a vague dread; rîmă/râmă means "earthworm" in Romanian.

The authorities believed that suggestive remarks from his father, who knew all about his son's crimes, had led him to commit violence. During the investigation, his father was arrested three times but released because close relatives could not be forced to testify against other family members. After Ion's last crime, when he robbed a cashier, his mother visited him and found the money under his pillow. His father made him go to the crime scene and showed him what he had done. He then took the money and placed it in his Caracal home, intending to use it to buy a new house. His father was first brought into the police station during one of Ion's silent phases; the son merely gave his father an ugly look, prompting the latter to say "How should I know what you did? How?" But he had reason to suspect it, as he had been washing his son's bloody clothes after the attacks. After Ion robbed the cashier, Florea confiscated the axe and knife and it was with these that he was secretly returning when he was arrested.

Rîmaru, whose trial drew significant public attention, thought he had convinced investigators of his insanity defence. He was apparently shocked when he read the report stating that his judgment was not impaired by mental illness, and that he did not suffer from hallucinations, delirium, or similar conditions. He immediately changed his plea, recanting his previous confessions in their entirety; thenceforth, he refused to answer even his lawyer's questions.

Eventually, Rîmaru was sentenced to death by judge Theodor Câmpeanu. The courtroom erupted in applause when the penalty was pronounced. He appealed, but the Supreme Tribunal upheld the sentence.

On 23 October 1971, Rîmaru was taken to Jilava Prison in a van. He had to be dragged to the place of execution from the moment he left the van. Until he was dead, he was in a rage and vigorously tried to escape. The three officers charged with shooting him tied him to a post in the prison yard. Asked, in accordance with the law, if he had any last wishes, he said no. The men noticed him become more agitated, trying to bite off his clothes and twisting around the post. He yelled, "Call my father, so he can see what's happening to me! Make him come! He's the only guilty one!" and "I want to live!" Because of his constant movement, it was difficult to aim accurately and in the end, his backside was riddled with bullets (as he had turned all the way around). He was buried in the town cemetery; his grave remains unmarked.

== Possible motives ==
A psychologist, Tudorel Butoi, viewed tapes of Rîmaru's interrogations several years after his execution. In Butoi's opinion, Rîmaru's crimes were a form of compensation for the inferiority complex he had felt since his youth: he was relatively poor, a social misfit, and had had dysfunctional relations with women.

At the time, Rîmaru was labelled a "wolf-man", and Butoi theorizes that he suffered from a form of clinical lycanthropy. As evidence, he cites his solitary nocturnal prowling and stalking, the instinctual animalistic energy he drew from unusual weather conditions, and how he considered his victims as prey. Rîmaru would figure out his victims' route, following them home several nights in a row, and attack them when they were almost home. Butoi rejects Rîmaru's claim to have tried to engage a woman in ordinary conversation one night as "merely dissimulations, perverse excuses".

=== A family affair ===
Rîmaru's father Florea was also a serial killer. In the summer of 1944, a string of four murders rocked wartime Bucharest. Each victim (all were female) lived in a basement apartment, where the criminal would enter at night during a storm and bash their heads with a blunt object. Each time, the killer left fingerprints and footprints from military boots of size 42 or 43. On 23 October 1972, a year after his son's execution, Florea Rîmaru died at age 53 after falling off a train. This was officially an accident, but some authors suggest he might have been eliminated by Securitate agents, though the reason for this alleged assassination remains unclear. His body was brought to the Medico-Legal Institute, where the man's height of 174 cm and his shoe size of 42 attracted attention: the 1944 fingerprints matched his. Both their first victims even had similar names: Florea first killed Elena Udrea, while his son Ion killed first Elena Oprea. Butoi, the psychologist, theorised that a gene predisposing one to violent crimes was passed from father to son, as the murders happened under remarkably similar circumstances.

== See also ==
- List of serial killers by country
