= Ștei =

- Town
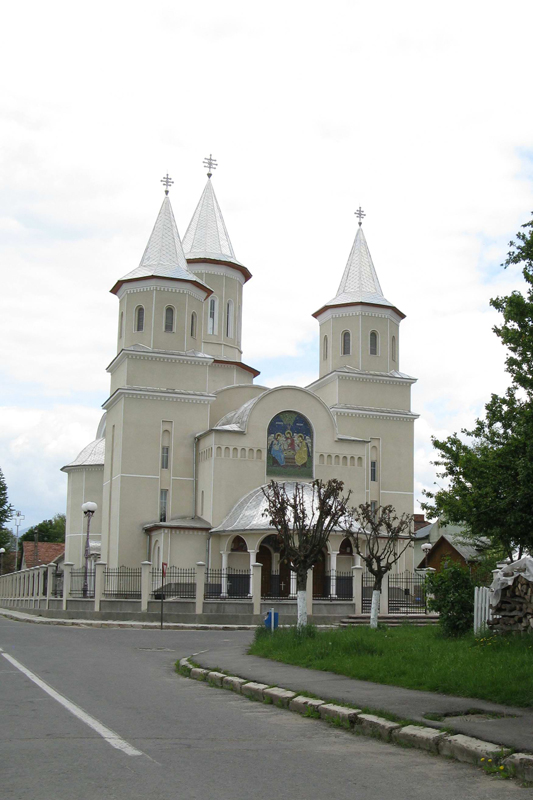

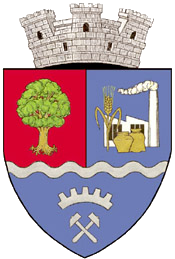
- Coat of arms

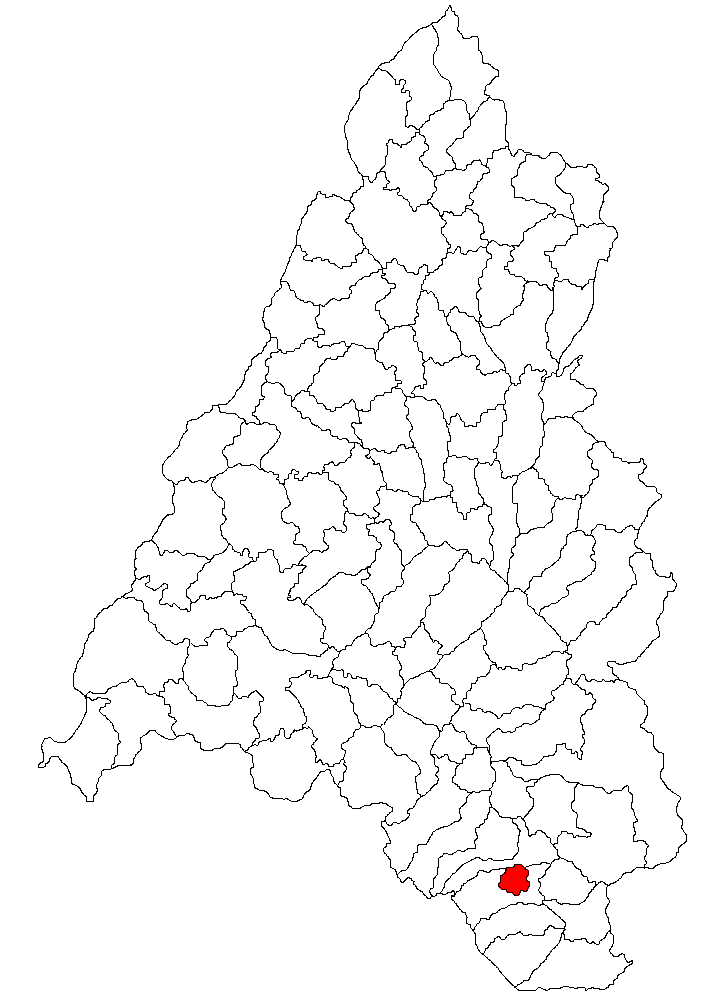
- Location in Bihor County

- Location in Romania
- Coordinates: 46°32′24″N 22°28′12″E
- Country: Romania
- County: Bihor

Government
  - Mayor (2024–2028): Iulian Balaj (PNL)
- Area: 6.57 km^{2} (2.54 sq mi)
- Elevation: 275 m (902 ft)
- Population (2021-12-01): 6.371
  - Density: 0.970/km^{2} (2.51/sq mi)
- Time zone: UTC+02:00 (EET)
  - Summer (DST): UTC+03:00 (EEST)
- Postal code: 415600
- Area code: (+40) 02 59
- Vehicle reg.: BH
- Website: www.stei.ro

Ștei (Hungarian: Vaskohsziklás) is a town in Bihor County, Crișana, Romania. Between 1958 and 1996, it was named Dr. Petru Groza, after the Romanian socialist leader who died in 1958.

== Geography ==
The town is located in the southeastern part of the county, and lies on the banks of the river Crișul Negru. It has an average of 285 meters above sea level.

With an average annual temperature of 9.8°C, the lowest recorded temperature is -24°C (18 January, 1963), highest is 38.5°C (2 August, 1961).

== History ==
The town was founded in 1952, by the Soviet occupiers near a village of the same name, as an industrial centre for the grinding of uranium mined at the nearby Băița mine, serving the intensive mining development set as an imperative by the Romanian Communist regime as part of a Soviet-Romanian joint venture during the Soviet occupation of Romania. Over 300,000 tons of ore was mined from the mine.

The uranium reserves in the Apuseni Mountains were discovered by a Romanian geologist named Muntean who worked in the gold mines in Brad. Samples were taken and sent to a mineralogy lab in Cluj for analysis. Germans gained administration of this lab during World War II, and decided to build an access road to exploit the deposits. They were later forced to abandon the work due to events on the front forces.

After the defeat of Germany, the Soviets possessed the information about the reserves. They decided to build a town in the village of Ștei, which had roughly five hundred inhabitants, near a railway which gave access to Bucharest. By 1956, they had managed to build numerous blocks of flats and barracks, an administrative palace, five cinemas, three dance floors, two schools, a sports base, a restaurant and some shops. Between 1952 and 1956, the town had a population of over 25,000 inhabitants.

Ștei was designed in Moscow by a Russian architect, which is why its streets are unique to those in other towns of Romania, being long and parallel.

Romulus Vereș, the notorious Romanian serial killer, was institutionalised in the Ștei psychiatric facility in 1976, and died there in 1993.

== Population ==
Historical population
Year	Pop.	±%
1880	377	—
1890	361	−4.2%
1900	417	+15.5%
1910	506	+21.3%
1920	504	−0.4%
1930	586	+16.3%
1941	545	−7.0%
1956	5,874	+977.8%
1966	5,754	−2.0%
1977	7,794	+35.5%
1992	10,415	+33.6%
2002	9,466	−9.1%
2011	6,144	−35.1%
2021	5,398	−12.1%
Source: Census data

At the census from 2011, there were 6,144 people living within the city; of those, 96.6% were ethnic Romanians, while 2.88% were ethnic Hungarians, and 0.5% others. According to the 2021 census, Ștei has a population of 5,398, of which 87.87% were Romanians and 1.43% Hungarians.

== Natives ==
- Irina Bara, tennis player (born 1995)
- Camelia Adina Hora, singer (born 1986)

== Sights ==
- Miron Pompiliu Memorial House
- Orthodox Church & the Monument of the Unknown Soldier
- The Cathedral
- The Bears' Cave
- The Ethnographic Museum at Butterflies

== Gallery ==
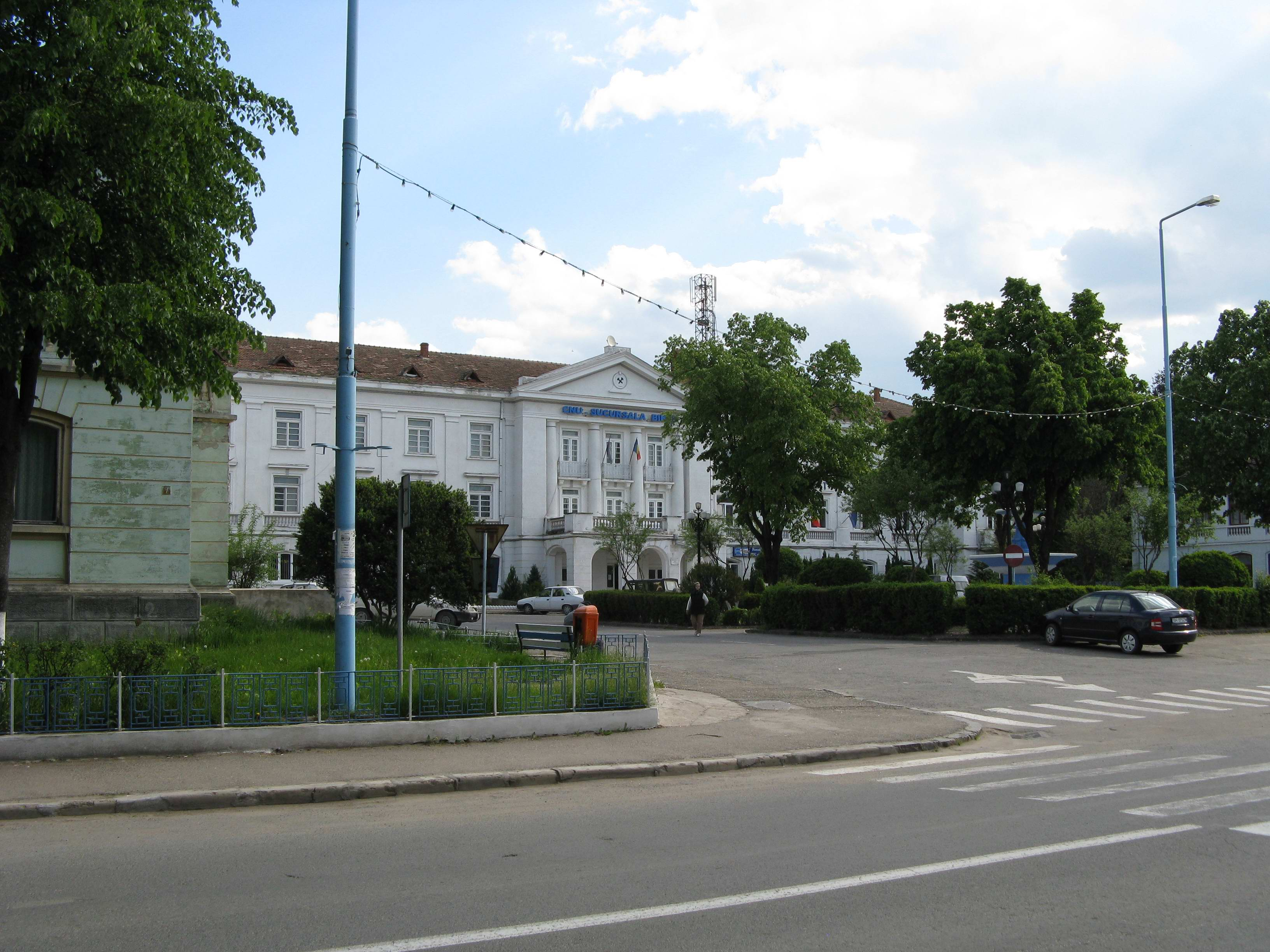
IMB Palace

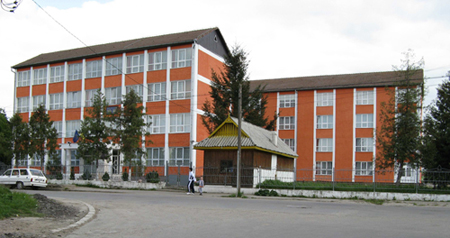
Colegiul National Avram Iancu Stei - National College

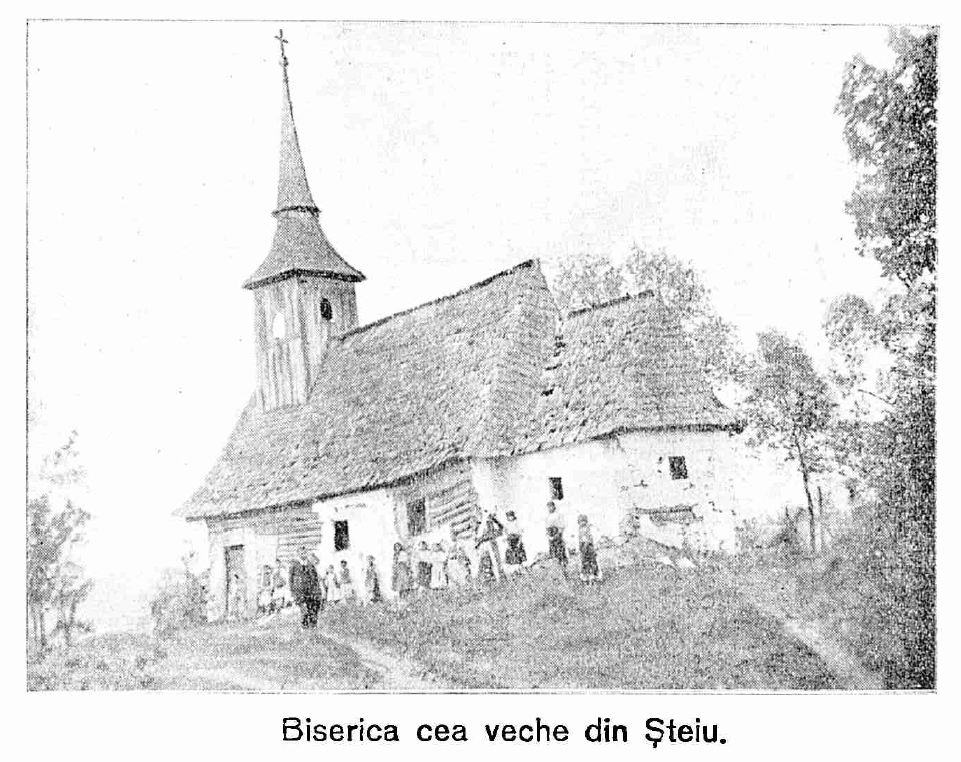
Wooden church from 1847-1897. No longer around.

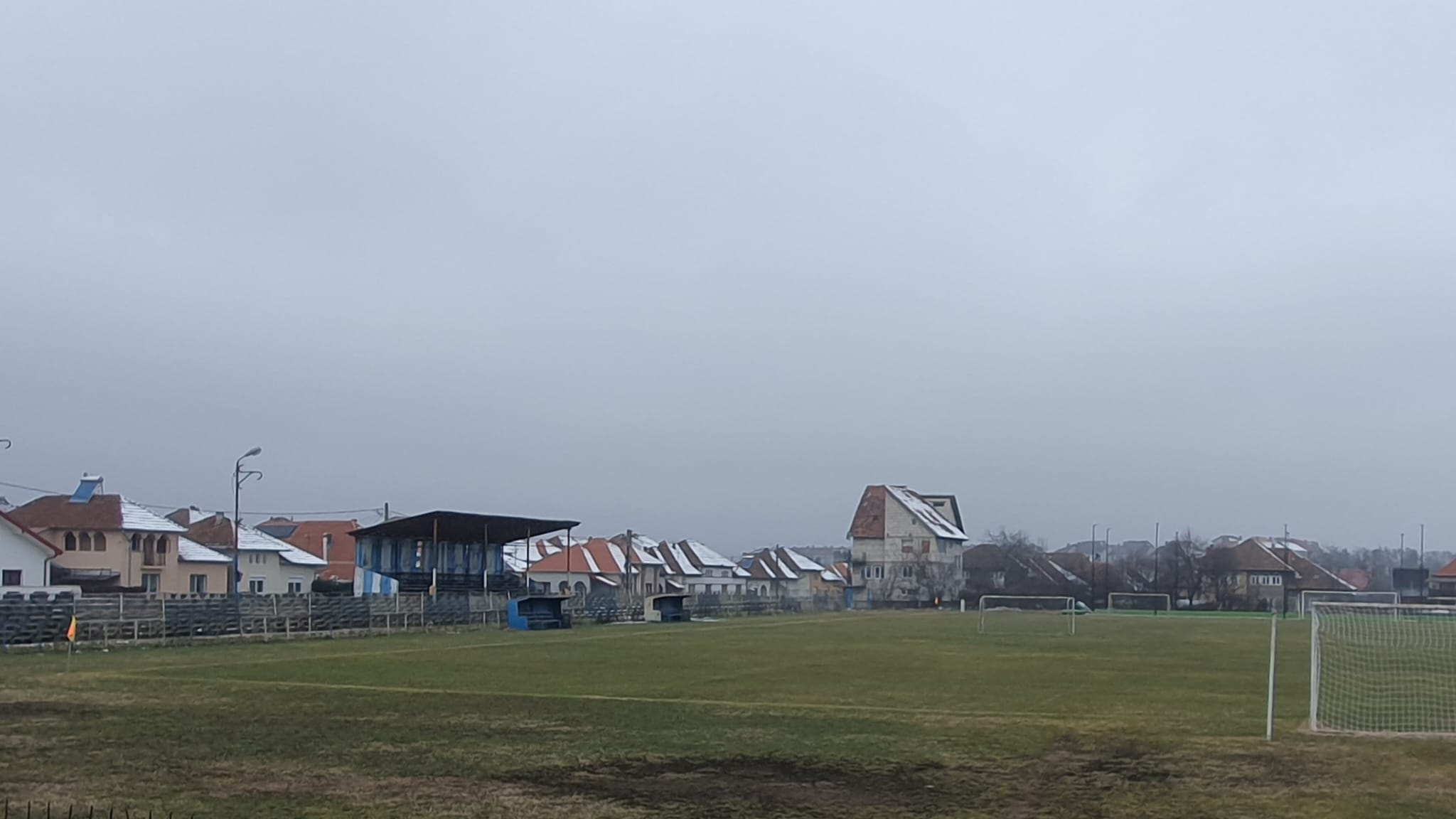
Minerul Stadium
