= List of rivers of Romania: L–O =

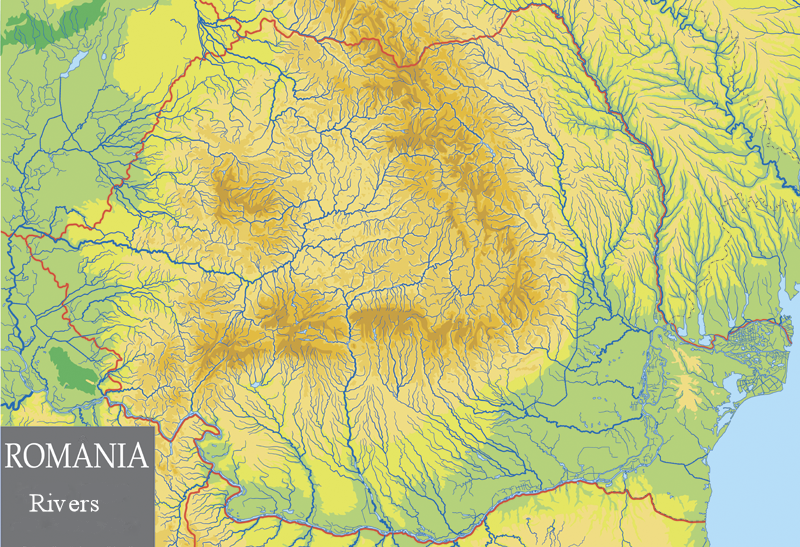
Map of Romania's hydrographic network

== L ==
River	Tributary of
Lădăuți	Buzău
Lanca Birda	Timiș
Lăpugiu	Valea Mare
Lăpuș	Someș
Lăpușnic	Nera
Lăpușnicul Mic	Râul Mare
Laslea	Târnava Mare
Latorița	Lotru
Laz	Sebiș
Lăzarea	Mureș
Lăzești	Neagra
Lazu	Mureș
Leaotul	Teleajen
Lechincioara	Valea Rea

River	Tributary of
Lechința	Dipșa
Lechința	Mureș
Leica	Siret
Lemnia	Râul Negru
Lepșa	Putna
Lesmânița	Podriga
Leșnic	Mureș
Leșu	Ilva
Leșunțul Mare	Oituz
Liborajdea	Danube
Lighidia	Miniș
Limbășel	Azuga
Limpedea	Trebeș
Lipău	Someș
Lipova	Tutova

River	Tributary of
Lișava	Caraș
Lișcov	Horincea
Lisnău	Râul Negru
Lodzova	Taița
Lohan	Crasna
Lonea	Someșul Mic
Lopatna	Matița
Lotrioara	Olt
Lotrișor	Olt
Lotru	Olt
Lozna	Rusca
Lozna	Someș
Lozova	Bârlădel
Lucșoara	Valea Mare

River	Tributary of
Lueriu	Mureș
Luica	Argeș
Lujerdiu	Someșul Mic
Lunca	Olt
Lunca Mare	Olt
Luncavăț	Olt
Luncavița	Danube
Luncavița	Mehadica
Luncoiu	Crișul Alb
Luncșoara	Hălmăgel
Lungșoara	Cibin
Lupoaia	Motru
Lupșa	Olt
Lupul	Tazlău
Luț	Mureș

== M ==
River	Tributary of
Măcicaș	Timiș
Mădărașul Mare	Olt
Mag	Săliște
Măgheruș	Bega Veche
Măgheruș	Mureș
Măgura	Bahlui
Măieruș	Olt
Maja	Crasna
Mala	Danube
Mălaia	Lotru
Mălâncrav	Laslea
Maleia	Jiul de Est
Mălina	Siret
Mamu	Oporelu Canal, Olt
Mănăileasa	Lotru
Mănăstirea	Gârboveta
Mănăstirea	Râul Târgului
Mândra	Olt
Mara	Iza
Mărăloiu	Someșul Mic
Mărcușa	Râul Negru
Măreasca	Sighișoara
Marga	Bistra
Mărgăuța	Săcuieu

River	Tributary of
Mârghia	Cotmeana
Măria	Someșul Mare
Marița	Cerna
Marpod	Hârtibaciu
Mărtinia	Sebeș
Martonca	Mureș
Matița	Cricovul Sărat
Medeș	Crișul Repede
Medgidia	Danube–Black Sea Canal
Mehadica	Belareca
Meleș	Someșul Mare
Merețel	Raznic
Merișoara	Jiul de Vest
Meziad	Valea Roșie
Micești	Râul Doamnei
Micuș	Hășdate
Mideș	Beliu
Mihăiasa	Jijia
Mihona	Elan
Milcov	Olt
Milcov	Putna
Milcovăț	Glavacioc
Milei	Bâsca

River	Tributary of
Miletin	Jijia
Milotina	Vânăta
Milova	Mureș
Miloveanu	Iminog
Mineu	Sălaj
Minezel	Sebiș
Miniș	Bega
Miniș	Nera
Misir	Crișul Repede
Mislei	Telega
Mitoc	Suceava
Mizieș	Crișul Negru
Mnierea	Crișul Repede
Moara	Siret
Moașa	Sebeș
Mociu	Fizeș
Mociur	Bega
Modicea	Olt
Moișa	Râșca
Moisea	Seaca
Moldova	Siret
Moldovița	Moldova
Molnița	Siret

River	Tributary of
Moneasa	Sebiș
Monoroștia	Mureș
Moravița	Bârzava (lower course)
Moravița	Bârzava (upper course)
Moreni	Tazlău
Morișca	Sitna
Mortăuța	Crasna
Moșna	Prut
Moșna	Târnava Mare
Mostiștea	Danube
Motnău	Râmnicul Sărat
Motru	Jiu
Motrul Sec	Motru
Mouca	Salcia
Mozacu	Dâmbovnic
Mraconia	Danube
Muereasca	Olt
Muncel	Crivadia
Murători	Becaș
Mureș	Tisza
Mușcel	Dâmbovița
Mustești	Crișul Alb

== N ==
River	Tributary of
Nadăș	Cigher
Nadăș	Someșul Mic
Nadeș	Târnava Mică
Nădrab	Govăjdia
Nădrag	Timiș
Năianca	Sărata
Nămolești	Danube
Năndreasca	Bega
Nanov	Vedea
Năruja	Zăbala
Neagra	Arieșul Mare
Neagra	Bistrița

River	Tributary of
Neagra Broștenilor	Bistrița
Neajlov	Argeș
Neajlovel	Neajlovel
Neamț	Moldova
Nechit	Bistrița
Negel	Trebeș
Negostina	Siret
Negraș	Doftana
Negrea	Lozova
Negreasca	Călmățui
Negreni	Amaradia

River	Tributary of
Negrileasa	Suha
Negrișoara	Dorna
Negrișoara	Neagra Broștenilor
Negrișoara	Plapcea
Nemțișor	Neamț
Nera	Danube
Nerganița	Nera
Nermed	Gelug
Netezi	Topolița
Nicolina	Bahlui
Nieregiș	Bega
Nimăiești	Crișul Negru

River	Tributary of
Niraj	Mureș
Nirajul Mare	Niraj
Nirajul Mic	Niraj (upper course)
Nirajul Mic	Niraj (middle course)
Nișcov	Buzău
Nisipari	Danube–Black Sea Canal
Nisipoasa	Olt
Nistru	Someș
Novăț	Vaser
Nuntași	Black Sea

== O ==
River	Tributary of
Oanțu	Bistrița
Oarba	Horincea
Oarța	Sălaj
Obârșa	Crișul Alb
Obârșia	Crușov
Ociu	Crișul Alb
Ocoliș	Arieș
Ocolișel	Arieș

River	Tributary of
Ohaba	Secaș
Ohaba	Strei
Oituz	Trotuș
Ojdula	Râul Negru
Olănești	Olt
Olanul	Cerna
Olpret	Someș

River	Tributary of
Olt	Danube
Olteț	Olt
Oltișor	Balta Dascălului
Orășa	Tazlău
Orăștie	Mureș
Oravița	Lișava
Ordâncușa	Gârda Seacă
Oreavu	Râmna

River	Tributary of
Orevița	Danube
Orlat	Săliște
Orlea	Tismana
Orman	Someșul Mic
Orșova	Gurghiu
Ortelec	Agrij
Otăsău	Bistrița
Ozunca	Baraolt
