= Horincea =

- Location within Romania

Location
- Country: Romania
- Counties: Vaslui, Galați
- Villages: Lupești, Aldești, Cavadinești, Rogojeni

Physical characteristics
- Mouth: Prut
  - location: Rogojeni
  - coordinates: 45.9719°N 28.1015°E
- Length: 35 km (22 mi)
- Basin size: 253 km^{2} (98 sq mi)

Basin features
- Progression: Prut→ Danube→ Black Sea
- Tributaries
  - left: Zoiteana, Lișcov
  - right: Oarba
- River code: XIII.1.23

The Horincea is a right tributary of the river Prut in Romania. It flows into the Prut in Rogojeni. Its length is 35 km (22 mi) and its basin size is 253 km^{2} (98 sq mi).
