= Ocoliș (disambiguation) =

Ocoliș may refer to the following places in Romania:

- Ocoliș, a commune in Alba County
- Ocoliș, a village in the commune Groși, Maramureș County
- Ocoliș (Arieș), a tributary of the Arieș in Alba County
- Ocoliș, a tributary of the Valea Luncanilor in Hunedoara County
