= Blăgești River =

Blăgești River may refer to:

- Blăgești, a tributary of the Bistrița in Bacău County
- Blăgești River (Elan)
