= Trebeș =

River in Romania

- Location within Romania

Location
- Country: Romania
- Counties: Bacău County
- Villages: Podiș, Luncani, Valea Budului, Trebeș, Mărgineni

Physical characteristics
- Mouth: Bistrița
  - location: Downstream of Bacău Dam
  - coordinates: 46°34′19″N 26°55′24″E
  - elevation: 141.5 m (464 ft)
- Length: 28 km (17 mi)
- Basin size: 184 km^{2} (71 sq mi)

Basin features
- Progression: Bistrița→ Siret→ Danube→ Black Sea
- Tributaries
  - left: Limpedea
  - right: Slatina, Cârligați, Negel

The Trebeș is a right tributary of the river Bistrița in Romania. It discharges into the Bistrița in Bacău. Its length is 28 km (17 mi) and its basin size is 184 km^{2} (71 sq mi).
