= Manolache =

Manolache may refer to several entities in Romania:

- Manolache, a village in Glina Commune, Ilfov County
- Odaia Manolache, a village in Vânători Commune, Galați County
- Valea Manolache River
- Manolache Costache Epureanu (1823–1880), politician
- Cicerone Manolache (1936–2024), footballer
- Ionela Târlea (born 1976), formerly Ionela Târlea-Manolache, track and field athlete
- Luca Manolache (2005–2025), footballer
