= Lotrișor =

Lotrișor may refer to the following rivers in Romania:

- Lotrișor (Călimănești), a right tributary of the Olt near Călimănești
- Lotrișor, a left tributary of the Olt (river) near Călinești
