= Cârligați =

- Location within Romania

Location
- Country: Romania
- Counties: Bacău County
- Villages: Pădureni

Physical characteristics
- Mouth: Trebeș
  - location: Mărgineni
  - coordinates: 46°35′32″N 26°50′06″E
  - elevation: 189 m (620 ft)
- Length: 9 km (5.6 mi)
- Basin size: 15 km^{2} (5.8 sq mi)

Basin features
- Progression: Trebeș→ Bistrița→ Siret→ Danube→ Black Sea

The Cârligați is a right tributary of the river Trebeș in Romania. It flows into the Trebeș near Mărgineni. Its length is 9 km (5.6 mi) and its basin size is 15 km^{2} (5.8 sq mi).
