= Valeamare =

Valeamare is the Hungarian name for two villages in Romania:

- Valea Mare village, Ceru-Băcăinți Commune, Alba County
- Valea Mare de Criș village, Tomești Commune, Hunedoara County
