= Prihodiște =

Prihodişte (Hungarian: Prihodest) may refer to several villages in Romania:

- Prihodişte, a village in Boșorod Commune, Hunedoara County
- Prihodişte, a village in Vața de Jos Commune, Hunedoara County
