= Galbenu River =

Galbenu River may refer to the following rivers in Romania:

- Galbenu, a tributary of the Latorița in Vâlcea County
- Galbenu, a tributary of the Lotrișor in Vâlcea County
- Galbenu, a tributary of the Vâja in Gorj County

== See also ==
- Galbena River (disambiguation)
