= Lunca Largă =

Lunca Largă may refer to several villages in Romania:

- Lunca Largă, a village in Bistra, Alba Commune, Alba County
- Lunca Largă, a village in Ocoliș Commune, Alba County
