= Plaiuri =

Plaiuri may refer to several villages in Romania:

- Plaiuri, a village in Pianu Commune, Alba County
- Plaiuri, a village in Petreștii de Jos Commune, Cluj County
