= Birtin =

Birtin may refer to several villages in Romania:

- Birtin, a village in Vadu Crișului Commune, Bihor County
- Birtin, a village in Vața de Jos Commune, Hunedoara County
