= Hășdate =

Hășdate may refer to several places in Romania:

- Hășdate, a village in the town of Gherla, Cluj County
- Hășdate, a village in Săvădisla Commune, Cluj County
- Hășdate (river), a river in Cluj County
