= Oarba =

- Location within Romania

Location
- Country: Romania
- Counties: Galați County
- Villages: Suceveni

Physical characteristics
- Mouth: Horincea
  - coordinates: 45.9722°N 28.0951°E
- Length: 17 km (11 mi)
- Basin size: 48 km^{2} (19 sq mi)

Basin features
- Progression: Horincea→ Prut→ Danube→ Black Sea
- River code: XIII.1.23.3

The Oarba is a right tributary of the river Horincea in Romania. It flows into the Horincea in Rogojeni. Its length is 17 km (11 mi) and its basin size is 48 km^{2} (19 sq mi).
