= Nicolae Matei =

Romanian politician

- Born: 1863; Bogdănești, Romanian United Principalities
- Died: 1933 (aged 69–70); Bogdănești, Bacău County, Kingdom of Romania
- Occupation(s): Politician, jurist, landowner

Nicolae Matei (1863–1933) was a Romanian politician who served as Deputy from 1905 to 1914 and as Senator from 1914 to 1933.

He married first Aglaia Popovici in 1893 and second time Smaranda Tașcă in 1920. His first wife died in 1917 during World War I in a shrapnel blast. His second wife was an agriculturist who had been trained in Germany under a special scholarship program sponsored by Queen Elisabeth of Romania.

Matei was also owner of the Bogdănești estate in Bacău County, which besides the mansion, also included farmland, a vineyard, two mills and some 57.5 hectares (142 acres) of woodlands. The estate was inherited by his male offspring, Virgiliu, but was expropriated in March 1949 after the rise to power of the communist regime. Eventually his offspring moved to Cork, Ireland where both his granddaughter, Ruxandra Colan Petcu, and his great-granddaughter Ioana Petcu-Colan, have pursued careers as musicians.
