= Galbena River =

Galbena River may refer to:

- Galbena River (Jiu)
- Râul Galben, in Hunedoara County

== See also ==
- Galbenu River (disambiguation)
