= Obârșa =

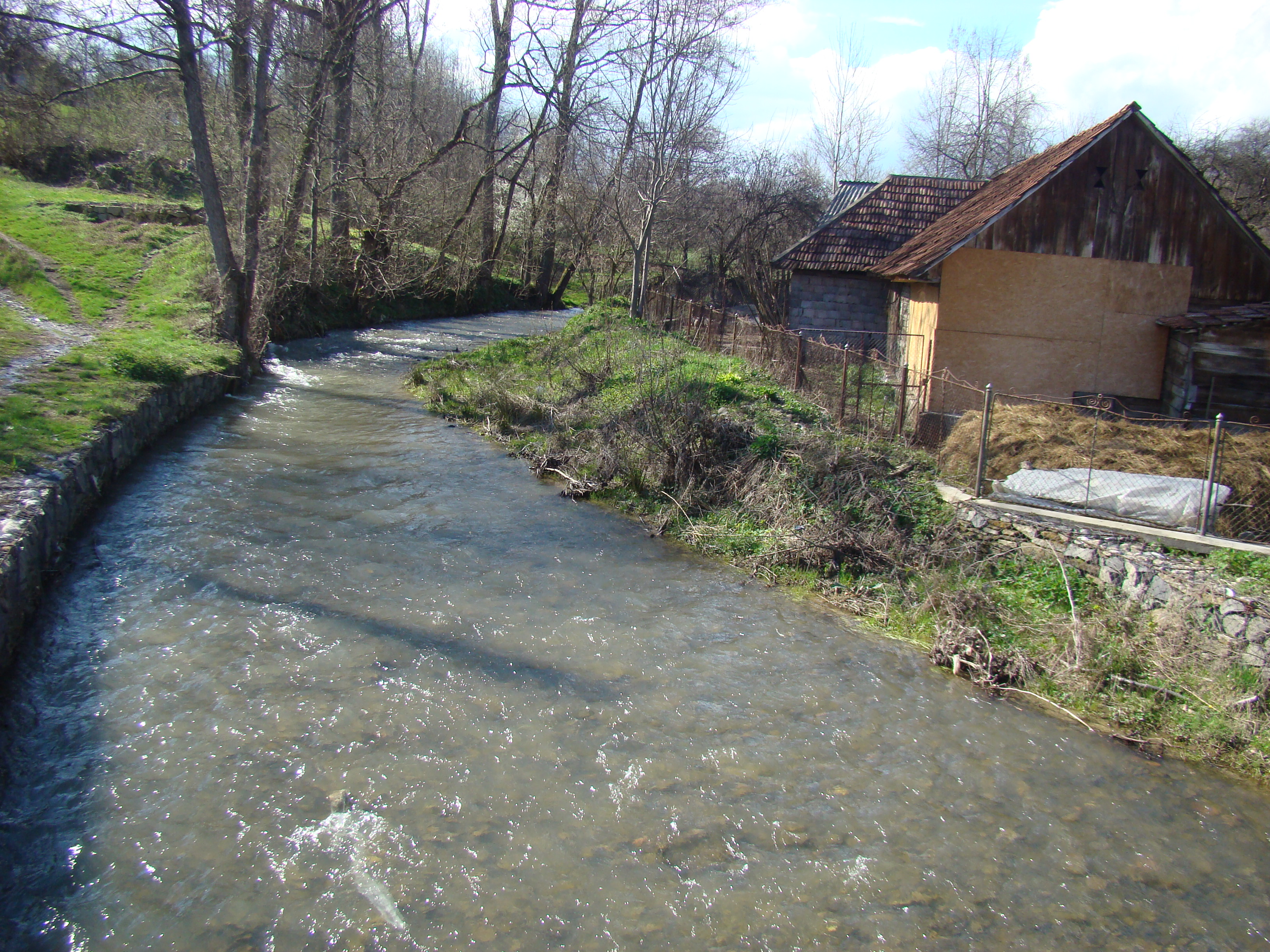

- Location within Romania

Location
- Country: Romania
- Counties: Hunedoara County
- Villages: Obârșa, Dobroț, Leauț, Tiulești, Șteia, Tomești, Târnava de Criș

Physical characteristics
- Source: Apuseni Mountains
- Mouth: Crișul Alb
  - location: Târnava de Criș
  - coordinates: 46.1871°N 22.6049°E
- Length: 23 km (14 mi)
- Basin size: 63 km^{2} (24 sq mi)

Basin features
- Progression: Crișul Alb→ Körös→ Tisza→ Danube→ Black Sea

The Obârșa is a right tributary of the river Crișul Alb in Romania. It discharges into the Crișul Alb in Târnava de Criș. Its length is 23 km (14 mi) and its basin size is 63 km^{2} (24 sq mi).
