= Ioan Măric =

Modern Romanian painter

- Born: 1945 (age 80–81); Luncani, Bacău County, Romania
- Other names: Bădiță Chagall (nickname, meaning roughly "Old Man Chagall")
- Occupation: Painter

Ioan Măric (born 1945) is a Romanian painter. He is an exponent of naïve art.

== Art ==
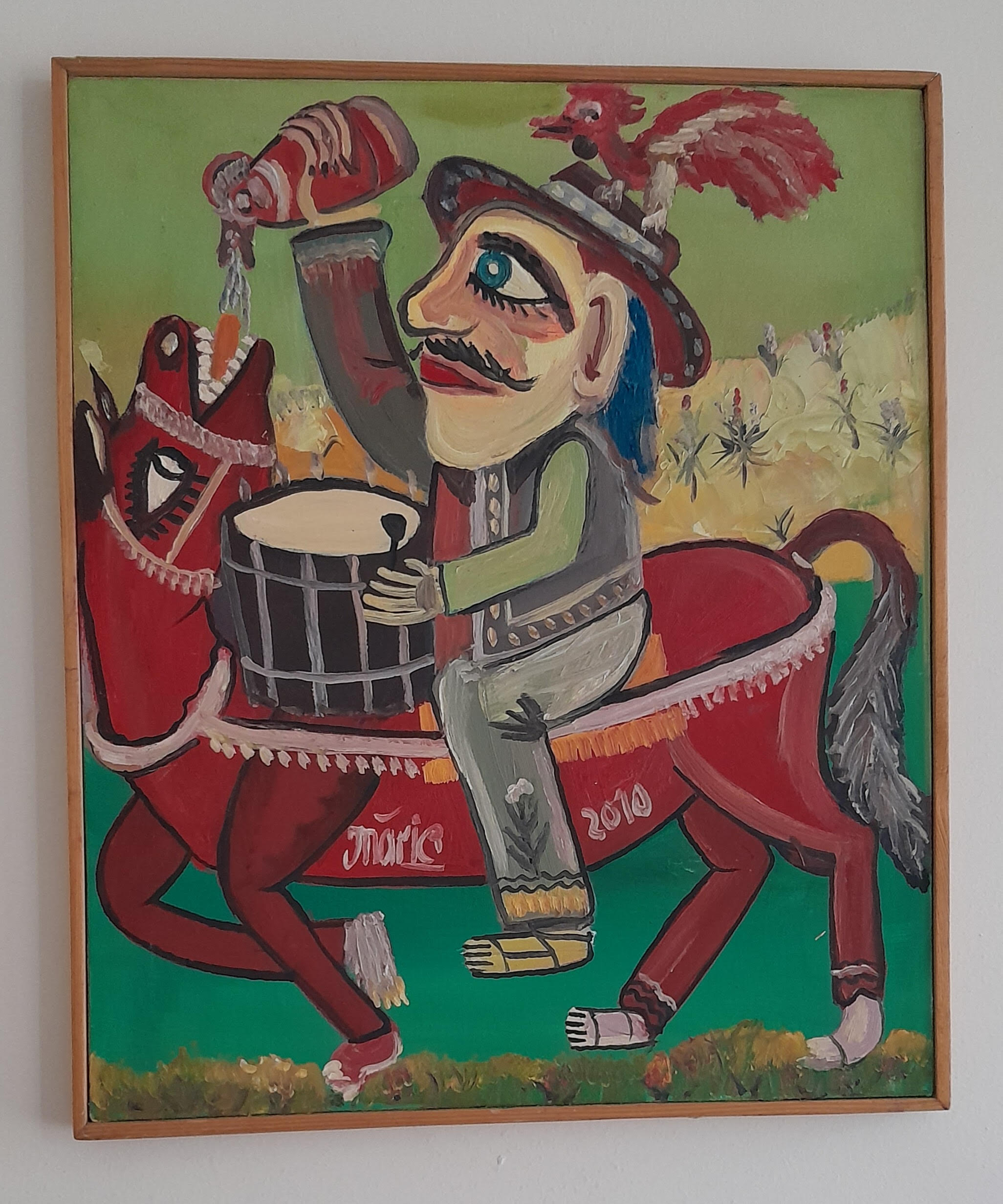
Vornicelu: Ioan Maric (2010)

Măric is a painter in the naive style, of which he is one of Romania's leading exponents. His work sometimes depicts scenes from proverbs and fairy tales, in compositions deeply rooted in Romanian peasant life. His pictures frequently show carnivalesque scenes of play and festivities, centred around moments of social gathering and joy. The paintings are characterised by a vivacious and exuberant use of colour, creating a sense of optimism.

Măric has devised his own colour and measurement rules, employing rich bright dyes and often comically grotesque and asymmetrical figures. Alongside the colour, he makes use of thick confident brushstrokes in black and white.

His style has earned him the nickname Bădiță Chagall, due to a perceived similarity to the work of Marc Chagall.

== Early life ==
Măric was born in 1945 to a peasant family in the village of Luncani, in the Romanian county of Bacău, and began to paint at the age of six. As an adolescent, he became an agricultural mechanic, and in 1967 became an employee at a wood factory, where he would continue to work until 1999.

Around the time he was employed at the factory, he started to study part time at the school of art in Bacău, where he was noticed by a prominent teacher and artist, Ilie Boca, who recommended him for the residential art camps which flourished during the Communist regime. After finishing his studies at the Bacău school, he stayed on to become an instructor in naïve art. Shortly after this, he began his relationship with his wife Niculina.

== Artistic career ==
During the Ceaușescu period, Măric was able to work without impediment. His chosen field, naive art, was supported by the regime, who viewed it as celebratory of the indigenous national Romanian peasant culture, and as such in keeping with the nationalist aspects of their ideology. His work was displayed at the Cîntarea României ("Singing of the Romanians") festivals, in which Romanian Communist Party functionaries promoted promising artists.

Măric‘s success continued in the post-Communist era; he was frequently awarded prizes, with one, in 1999, commending him "for the remarkable manner of reflecting through naïve art the Romanian peasant’s spirituality."

However, despite his critical success, Măric was undergoing financial difficulties in the early 2000s. Living in an apartment in Bacău, he received a small pension, and made a precarious living selling his works for low prices at craft fairs in Bucharest.

From 2006, Măric participated in a range of national and international exhibitions, including the Quinzaine culturelle franco–roumaine (Strasbourg, 2006), the Biennale d’Arte Naïf (Brussels, 2009–2010), and the Festival d’Arte Naïf, Verneuil-sur-Avre (2010). At the same time, Măric continued to sell his paintings in the national circuit of folk fairs, held at museums and municipal festivals, as well as Romanian tourist festivals.

Măric published a pictorial book entitled Lada de Zestre (Dowry Chest) in 2012, which was launched at St Mary's Fair festival at the Village Museum in Bucharest. It was a collection of photos and accompanying texts displaying members of his family, celebrities from across Romania and Europe, and tableaus featuring his work.

In 2014, at the age of 69, Măric made the decision to study at the George Enescu National University of Arts in Iași. His experience at the university, and the conflict with other naive artists arising from it, was the subject of a 2018 documentary entitled Comoara Naivă ("Naive Treasure") directed by Moscu Copel. According to Copel, Măric‘s motivation to study was his view that talent and quality are not appreciated unless recognised with a degree. Copel states that Măric told him: “I don't want to die a fool. Write on the cross that a teacher has died!"

In 2018, there was an exhibition of Măric‘s work at the New Gallery of the Romanian Institute of Culture and Humanistic research in Venice.

As of 2023, more than 200 solo exhibitions of his work had been held, and his work had been displayed in over 2,000 collective exhibitions.
