= Hășdate (river) =

River in Romania

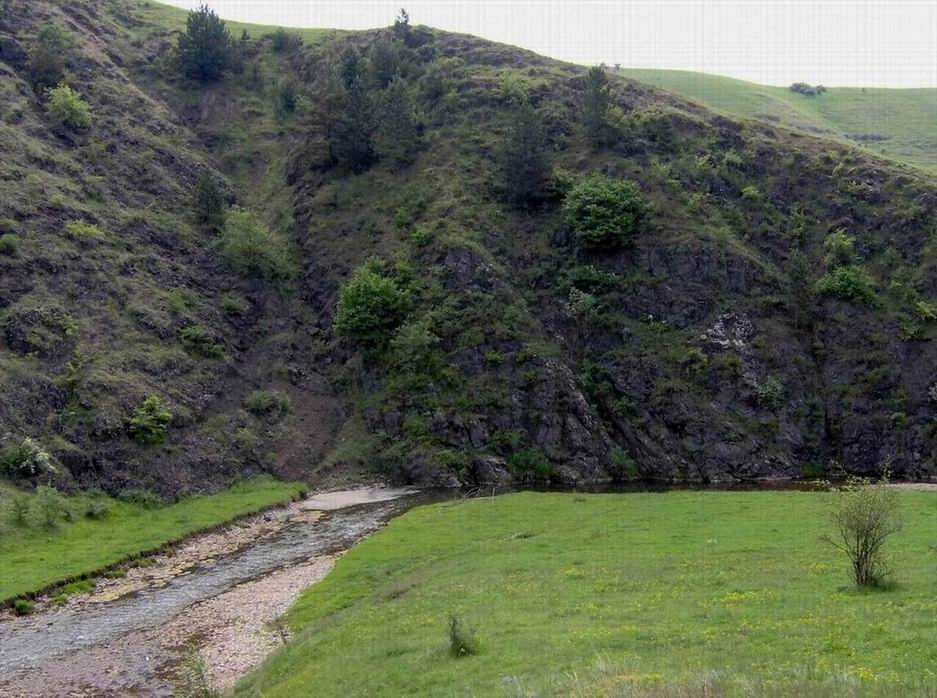
- The Hășdate Gorge between Cheile Turzii and Cornești

- Location within Romania

Location
- Country: Romania
- Counties: Cluj County
- Villages: Hășdate, Ciurila, Petreștii de Jos

Physical characteristics
- Mouth: Arieș
  - location: Corneşti
  - coordinates: 46.526°N 23.686°E
- Length: 32 km (20 mi)
- Basin size: 213 km^{2} (82 sq mi)

Basin features
- Progression: Arieș→ Mureș→ Tisza→ Danube→ Black Sea
- Tributaries
  - left: Micuș

The Hășdate (also: Hăjdate, Hungarian: Hesdát-patak) is a small river in the Apuseni Mountains, Cluj County, western Romania. It is a left tributary of the river Arieș. It flows through the municipalities Săvădisla, Ciurila and Petreștii de Jos, and joins the Arieș at Corneşti, near Turda. Its length is 32 km (20 mi) and its basin size is 213 km^{2} (82 sq mi). It formed the Cheile Turzii, a narrow river gorge.

== Tributaries ==
The following rivers are tributaries to the river Hășdate (from source to mouth):

- Left: Sălicea, Săliște, Micuș, Negoteasa
- Right: Filea, Livada, Petridul
