= Prăvăleni =

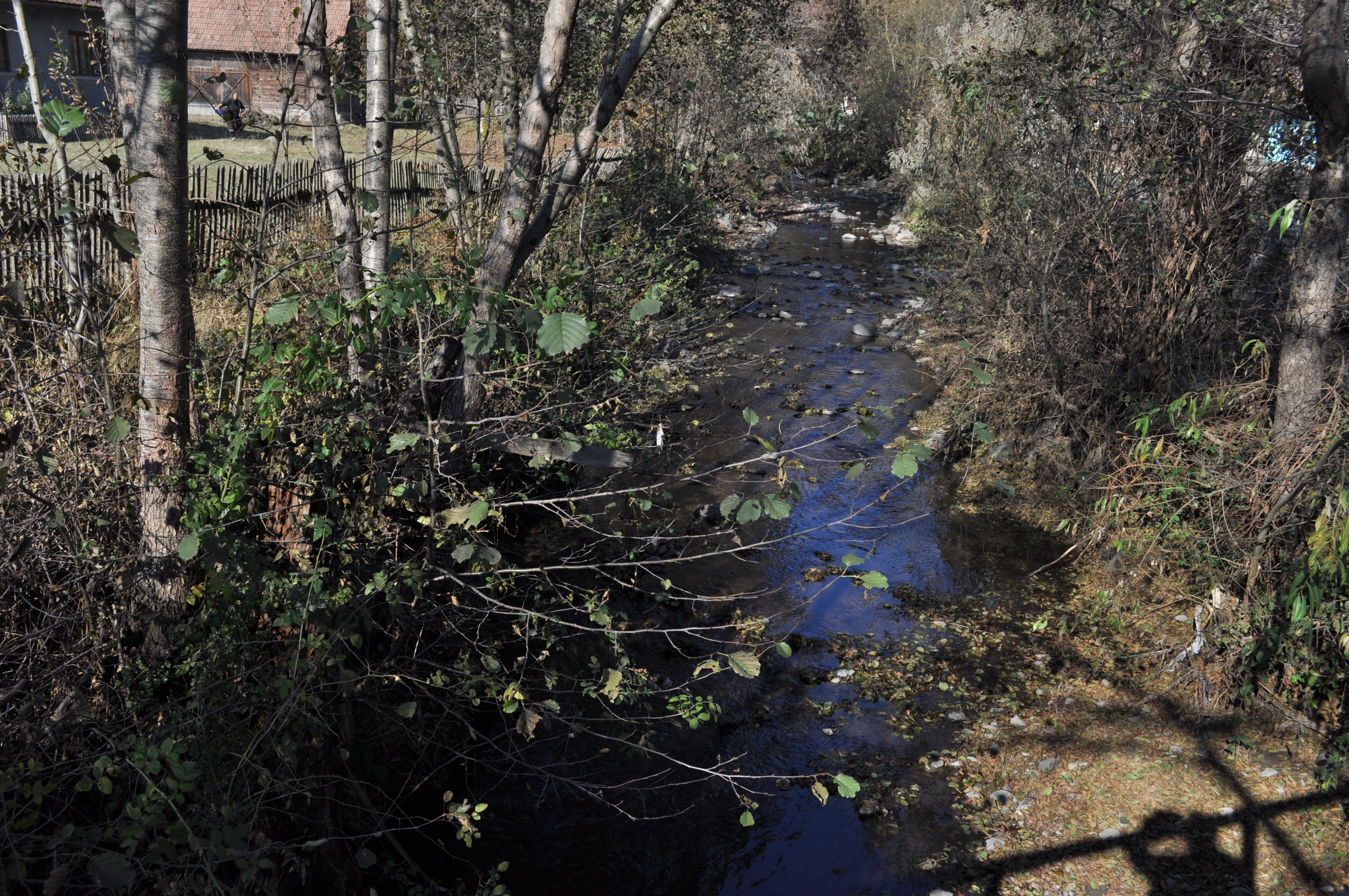

- Location within Romania

Location
- Country: Romania
- Counties: Hunedoara County
- Villages: Ciungani, Prăvăleni, Basarabasa

Physical characteristics
- Mouth: Crișul Alb
  - location: Târnava de Criș
  - coordinates: 46.1966°N 22.5915°E
- Length: 12 km (7.5 mi)
- Basin size: 50 km^{2} (19 sq mi)

Basin features
- Progression: Crișul Alb→ Körös→ Tisza→ Danube→ Black Sea
- Tributaries
  - left: Basarabița

The Prăvăleni is a left tributary of the river Crișul Alb in Romania. It discharges into the Crișul Alb in Târnava de Criș. Its length is 12 km (7.5 mi) and its basin size is 50 km^{2} (19 sq mi).
