= Bogdănești, Bacău =

Bogdănești
- Commune
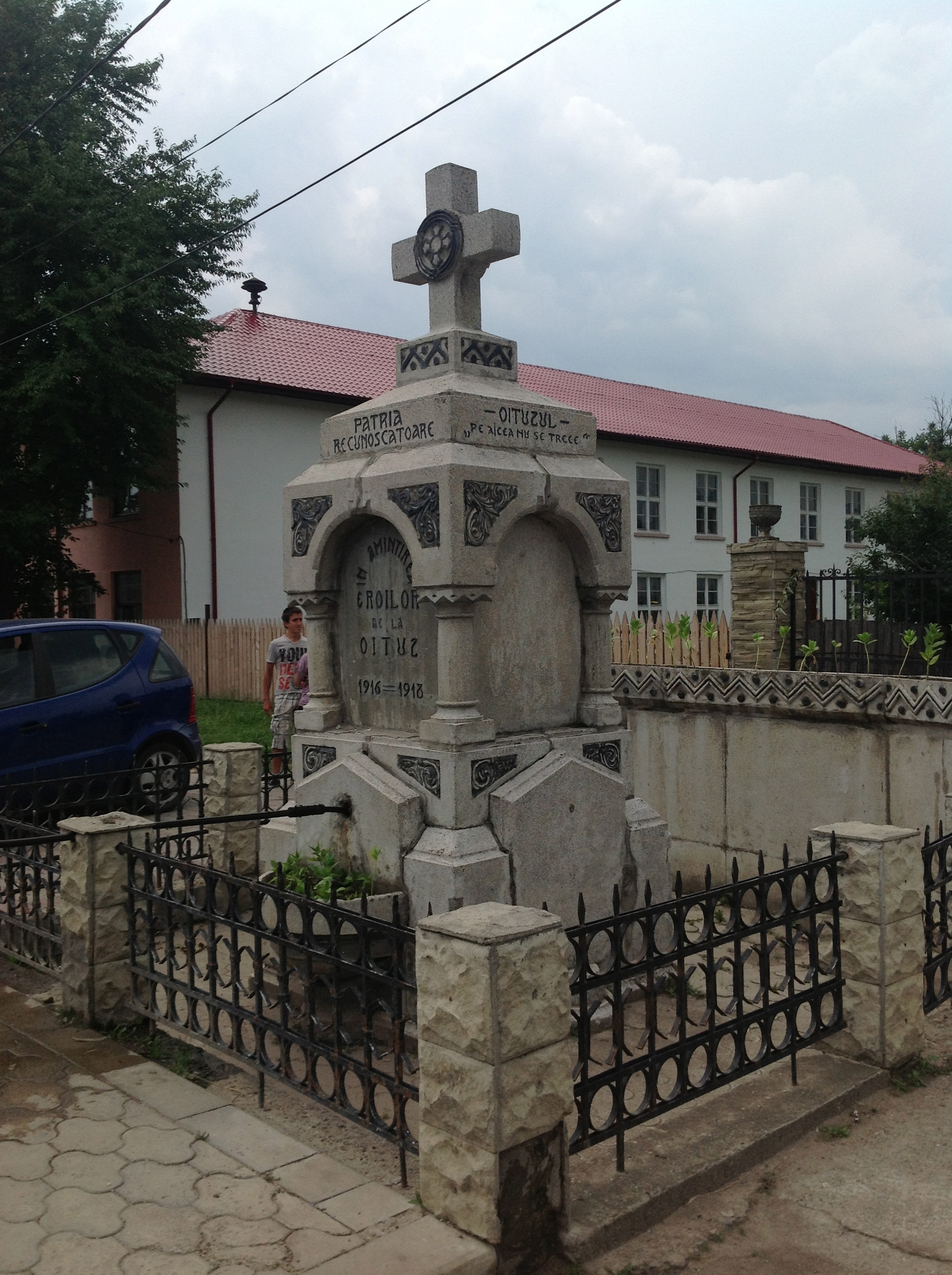
- World War I heroes monument in Bogdănești

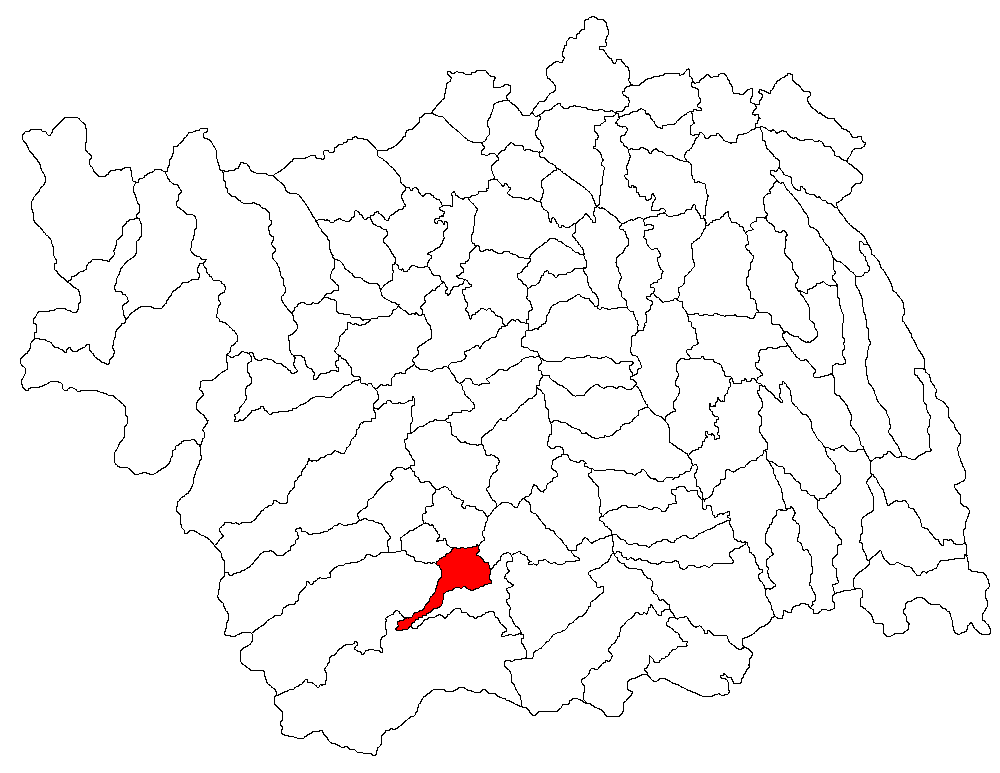
- Location in Bacău County

- Location in Romania
- Coordinates: 46°13′N 26°41′E
- Country: Romania
- County: Bacău

Government
  - Mayor (2020–2024): Nicolae Andrușcă (PSD)
- Area: 32.04 km^{2} (12.37 sq mi)
- Elevation: 272 m (892 ft)
- Population (2021-12-01): 2,399
  - Density: 74.88/km^{2} (193.9/sq mi)
- Time zone: UTC+02:00 (EET)
  - Summer (DST): UTC+03:00 (EEST)
- Postal code: 607070
- Area code: +(40) 234
- Vehicle reg.: BC
- Website: www.primariabogdanestibacau.ro

Bogdănești is a commune in Bacău County, Western Moldavia, Romania located on the Oituz River valley. It is composed of two villages, Bogdănești and Filipești.

The commune is situated on the Moldavian Plateau, at an altitude of 272 m (892 ft), on the banks of the Oituz River. It is located in the southwestern part of the county, 10.7 km (6.6 mi) from Onești municipality and 56 km (35 mi) from the county seat, Bacău. Bogdănești is traversed by the national road DN11, which connects Onești with Târgu Secuiesc, crossing the Carpathian Mountains through the Oituz Pass.

Historical population
Year	Pop.	±%
2002	2,764	—
2011	2,550	−7.7%
2021	2,399	−5.9%
Source: Census data

== Natives ==
- Nicolae Matei (1863–1933), politician
