= Sebeș (Sibiu) =

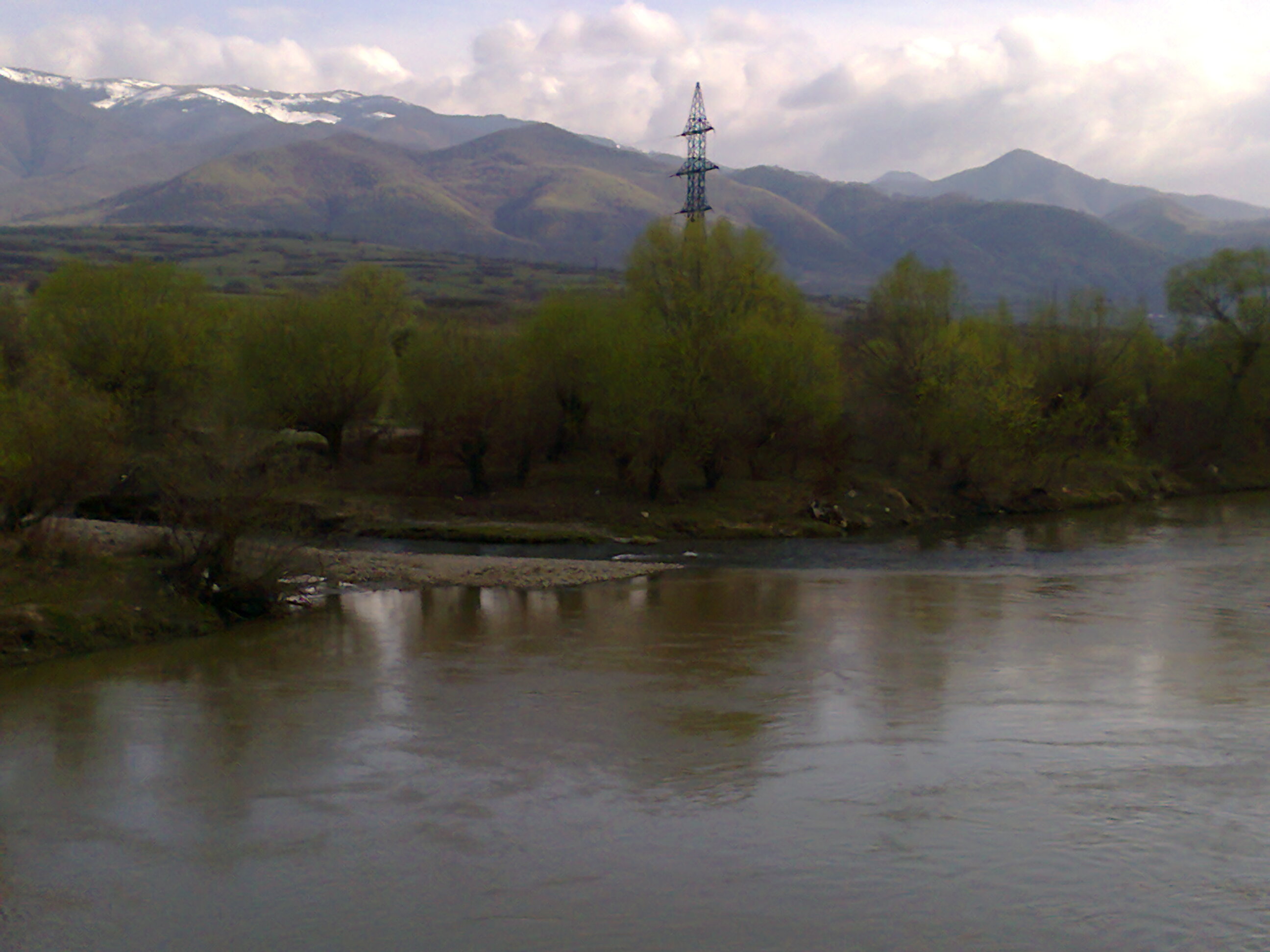
- The confluence of the Sebeș with the Olt

- Location within Romania

Location
- Country: Romania
- Counties: Sibiu County
- Villages: Sebeșu de Jos

Physical characteristics
- Source: Făgăraș Mountains
- Mouth: Olt
  - coordinates: 45.6684°N 24.3153°E
- Length: 11 km (6.8 mi)
- Basin size: 44 km^{2} (17 sq mi)

Basin features
- Progression: Olt→ Danube→ Black Sea
- Tributaries
  - right: Valea lui Fătu, Moașa

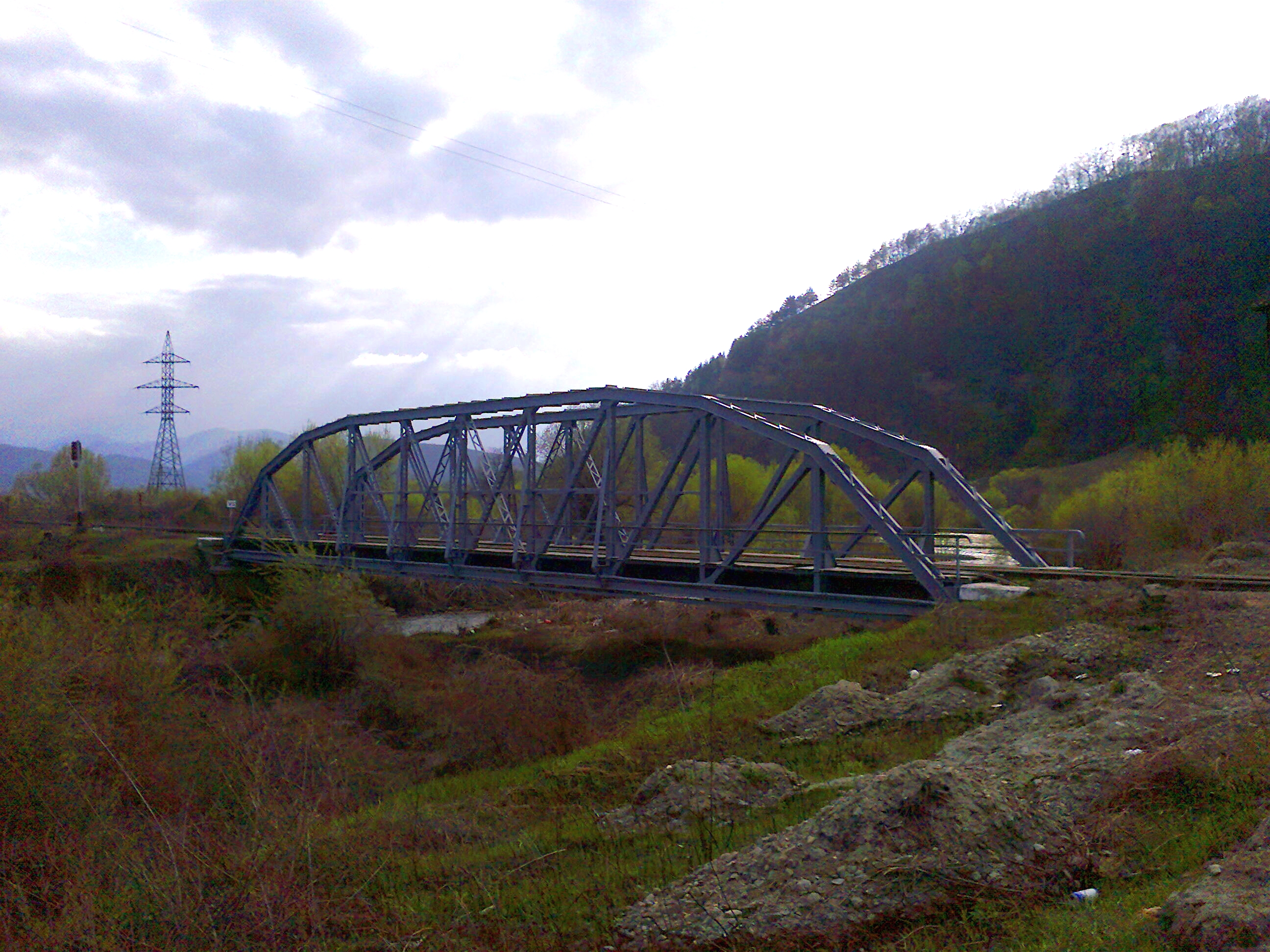
The railway bridge over the Sebeș

The Sebeș is a left tributary of the river Olt in Romania. It originates in the northwestern part of the Făgăraș Mountains. It discharges into the Olt near Sebeșu de Jos. Its length is 11 km (6.8 mi) and its basin size is 44 km^{2} (17 sq mi).
