= Caraslău =

- Location within Romania

Location
- Country: Romania
- Counties: Covasna, Bacău

Physical characteristics
- Mouth: Oituz
  - coordinates: 46.1032°N 26.4081°E
- Length: 7 km (4.3 mi)
- Basin size: 18 km^{2} (6.9 sq mi)

Basin features
- Progression: Oituz→ Trotuș→ Siret→ Danube→ Black Sea

The Caraslău is a left tributary of the river Oituz in Romania. It flows into the Oituz north of the village Oituz. Its length is 7 km (4.3 mi) and its basin size is 18 km^{2} (6.9 sq mi).
