= Măieruș =

- Commune
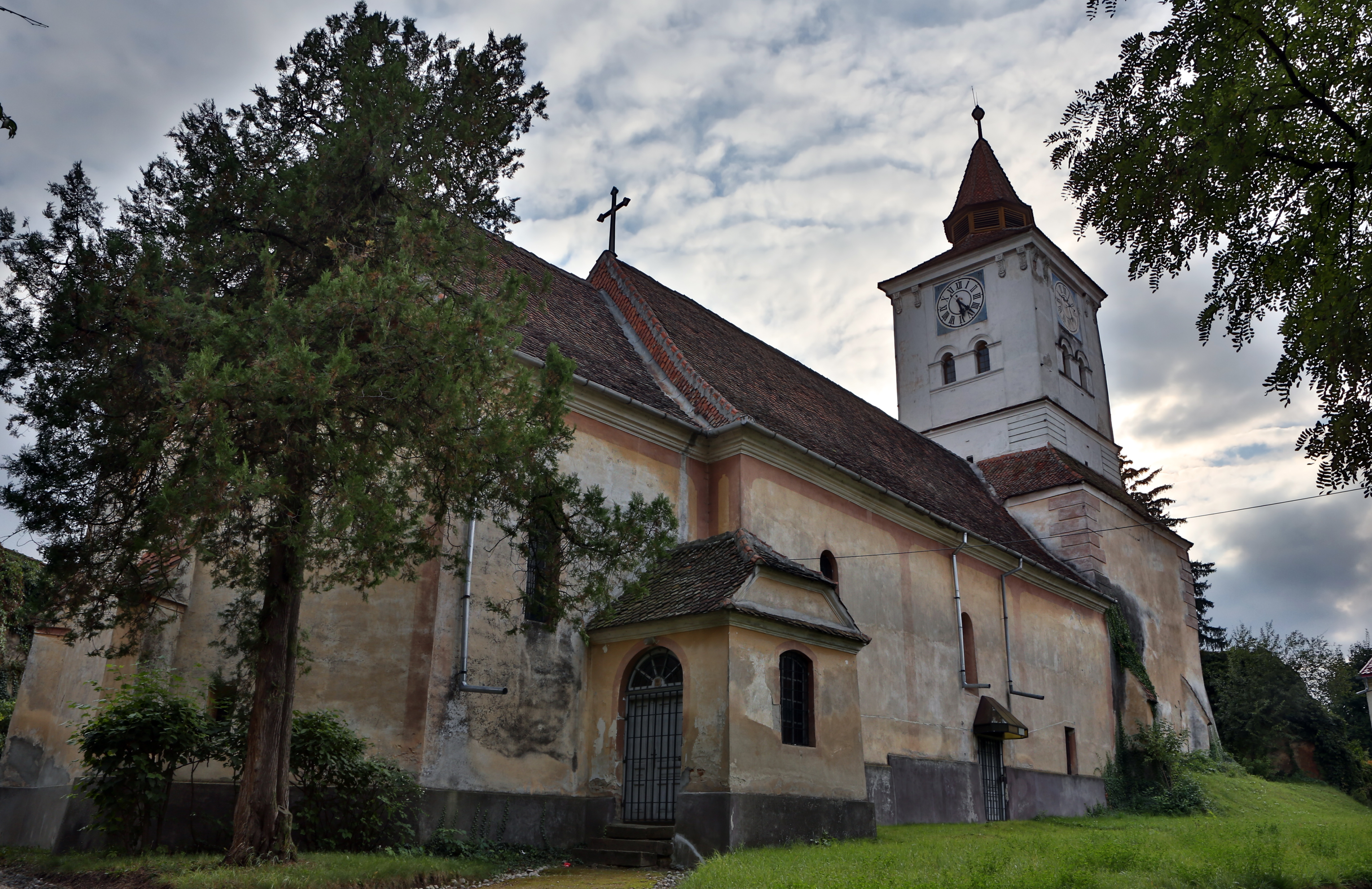
- Măieruș fortified church

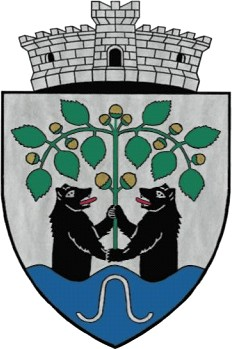
- Coat of arms

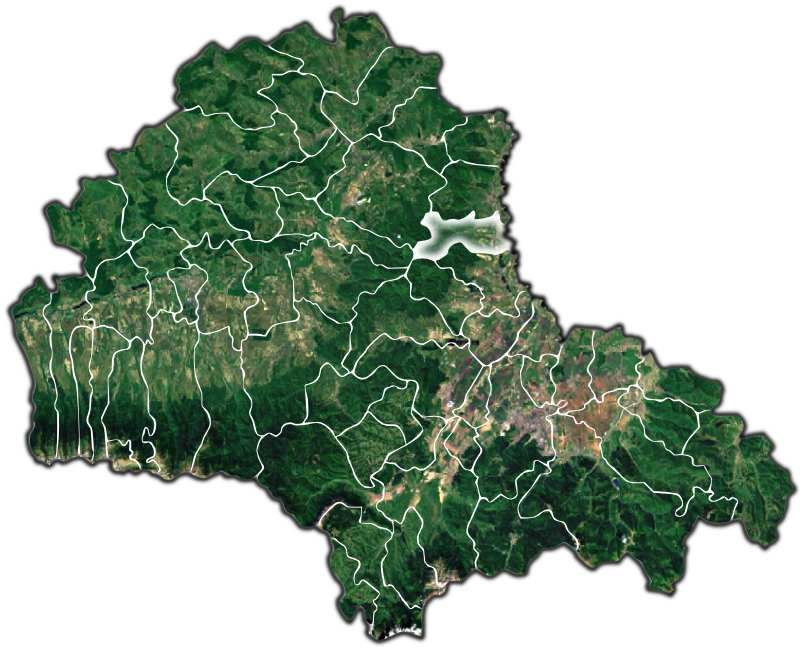
- Location within the county

- Location in Romania
- Coordinates: 45°54′N 25°32′E
- Country: Romania
- County: Brașov

Government
  - Mayor (2020–2024): Nistor Boricean (PNL)
- Area: 65.07 km^{2} (25.12 sq mi)
- Elevation: 496 m (1,627 ft)
- Population (2021-12-01): 3,138
  - Density: 48.22/km^{2} (124.9/sq mi)
- Time zone: UTC+02:00 (EET)
  - Summer (DST): UTC+03:00 (EEST)
- Postal code: 507120
- Area code: (+40) 02 68
- Vehicle reg.: BV
- Website: comunamaierus.ro

Măieruș (German: Nußbach; Hungarian: Szászmagyarós) is a commune in Brașov County, Transylvania, Romania. It is composed of two villages, Arini (Lüget) and Măieruș. The settlement was mentioned for the first time in 1377 as "villa nucum".

== Geography ==
Măieruș is situated at an altitude of about 500 m (1,600 ft), on the left bank of the Olt River; the river Măieruș flows into the Olt in the village Măieruș. The Perșani Mountains are to the west and the Baraolt Mountains to the east.

The commune is located in the central part of Brașov County, 30 km (19 mi) north of the county seat, Brașov, on the border with Covasna County. It was considered to be the most northern commune in the historical Burzenland region, although Apața is nowadays the northern limit of the region. Măieruș borders the following communes: Apața to the north; Belin and Hăghig to the east and southeast; Feldioara to the south; and Comăna and Hoghiz to the west.

== Transportation ==
The commune is crossed by national road DN13, which links Brașov with Sighișoara and Târgu Mureș. The Măieruș train station and the Vadu Roșu halt serve the CFR Main Line 300, which connects Bucharest with the Hungarian border near Oradea.

== Demographics ==
Historical population
| Year | Pop. | ±% |
|---|---|---|
| 1869 | 1,469 | — |
| 1930 | 1,625 | +10.6% |
| 2002 | 2,527 | +55.5% |
| 2011 | 2,920 | +15.6% |
| 2021 | 3,138 | +7.5% |
Source: Census data

At the 2011 census, Măieruș had 2,920 inhabitants; of those, 56.1% were Romanians, 40.3% Roma, 2.6% Germans, and 0.9% Hungarians. At the 2021 census, the commune had a population of 3,138, of which 49.04% were Romanians, 40.63% Roma, and 1.37% Germans.
