= Micuș =

- Location within Romania

Location
- Country: Romania
- Counties: Cluj County
- Villages: Micești, Deleni, Petreștii de Jos

Physical characteristics
- Mouth: Hășdate
  - location: Petreștii de Jos
  - coordinates: 46.5851°N 23.6489°E
- Length: 16 km (9.9 mi)
- Basin size: 40 km^{2} (15 sq mi)

Basin features
- Progression: Hășdate→ Arieș→ Mureș→ Tisza→ Danube→ Black Sea

The Micuș is a left tributary of the river Hășdate in Romania. It flows into the Hășdate in Petreștii de Jos. Its length is 16 km (9.9 mi) and its basin size is 40 km^{2} (15 sq mi).
