= Turda Gorge =

Gorge and protected area in Romania

Coordinates: 46°33′50″N 23°40′45″E

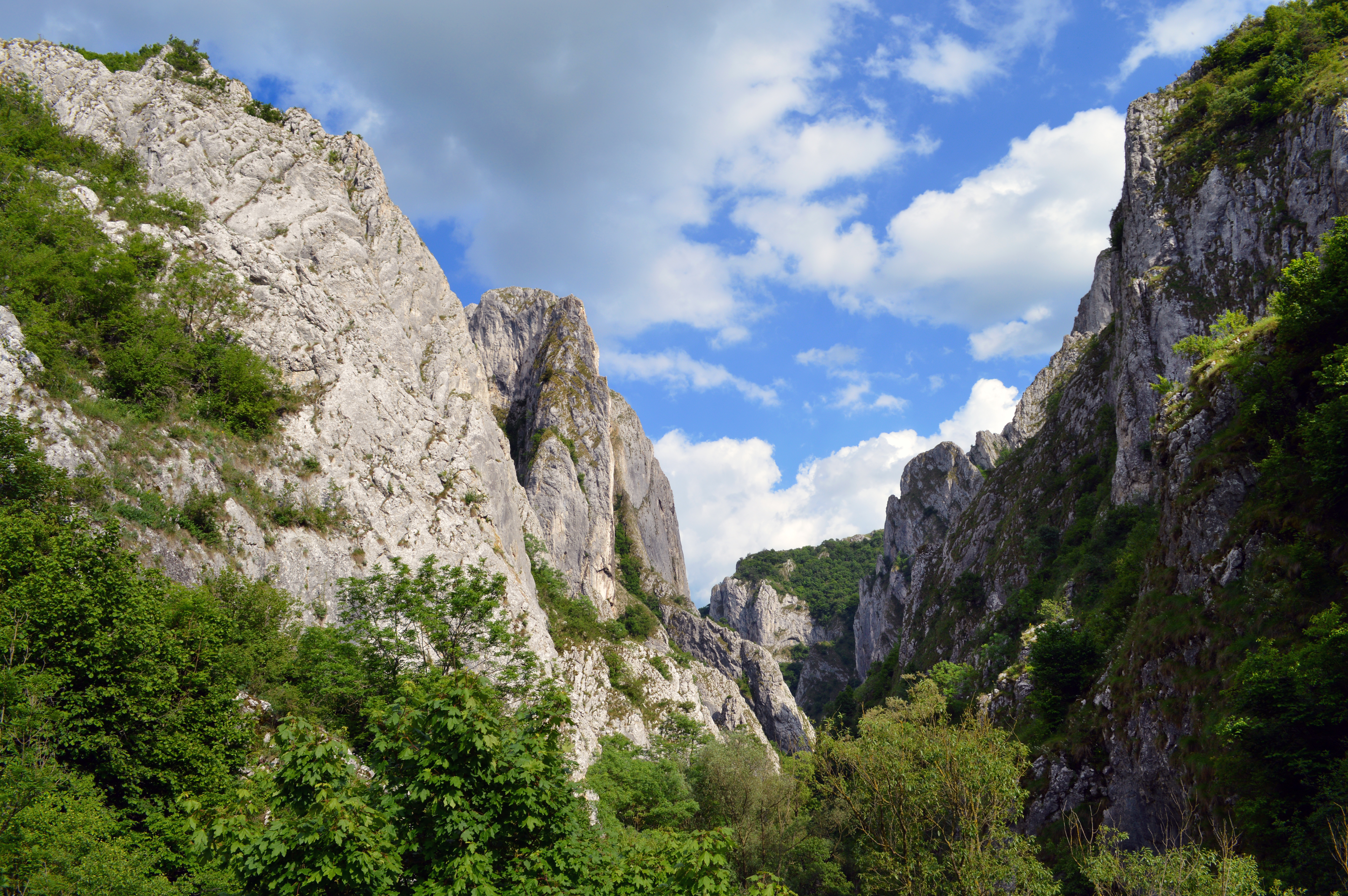
Turda Gorges seen from the west end

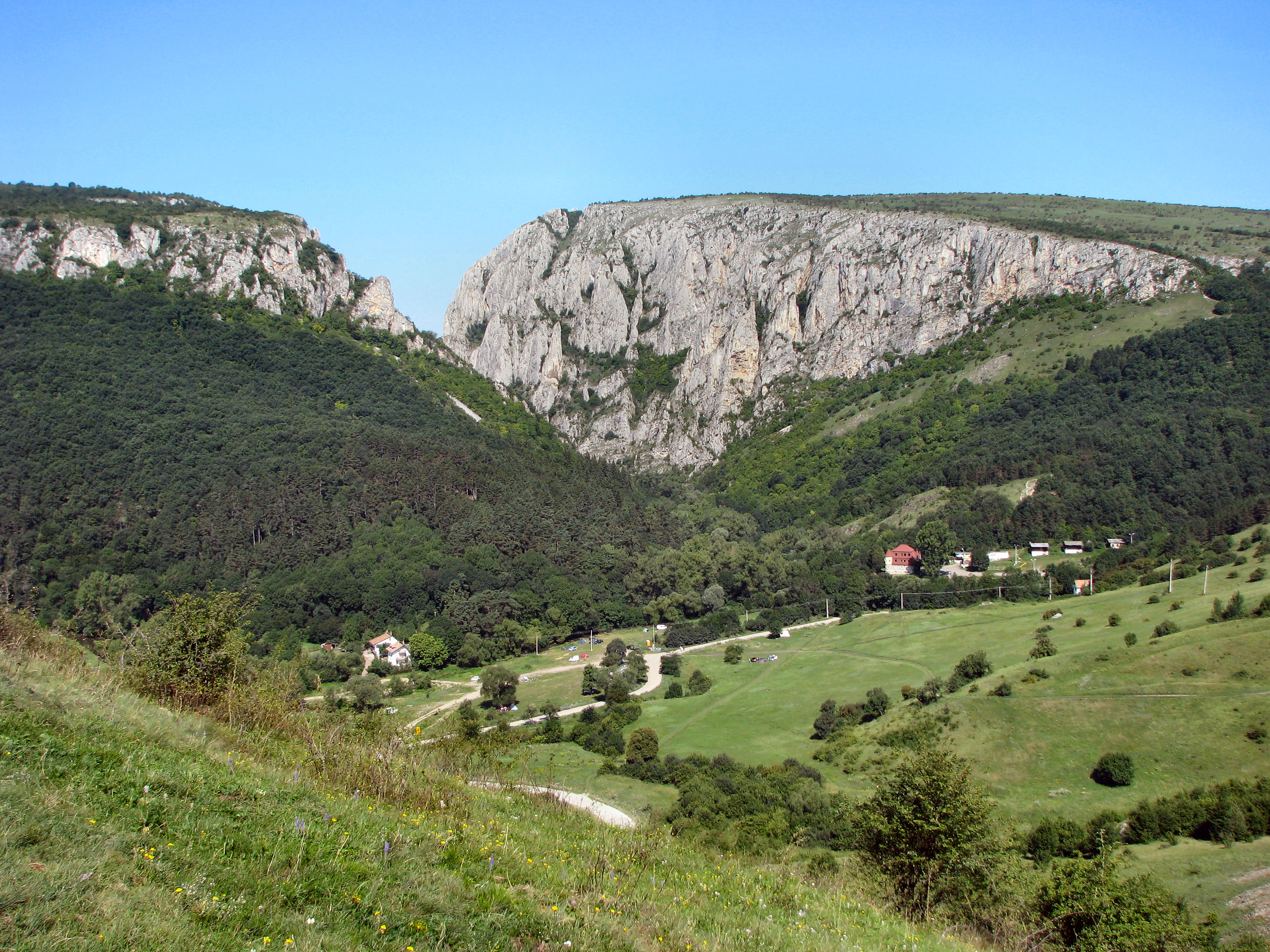
Turda Gorge seen from the east end

Turda Gorge (Romanian: Cheile Turzii, Hungarian: Tordai-hasadék) is a natural reserve (on Hășdate River) situated 6 km west of Turda and about 15 km south-east of Cluj-Napoca, in Transylvania, Romania.

== Geography ==
The canyon, formed through the erosion of the Jurassic limestone of the mountain, is 2 900 m long and the walls have heights reaching 300 m. The total surface of the canyon is of 324 ha.

More than 1000 plant and animal species (some of them rare or endangered, like the wild garlic or some species of eagle) live here.

== History ==
The site has been inhabited since the Neolithic.

== Flora ==
More than 1,000 plant species can be found in the reservation, including Allium obliquum, Dianthus integripetalus, Viola jobi.

== Fauna ==
67 species of birds, butterflies (Eublema, Heterogynis, Dysauxes, Phybalopterix etc.) fish, amphibians and some mammals (foxes, weasels, martens, wild boars etc.

== Caves ==
There are some 60 known caves, almost all of them being of small size (the longest one is 120 m).

== Other tourist attractions ==
Cheile Turzii are just a few km away from two other canyons (Cheile Turului and Cheile Borzești) as well as from Ciucaș waterfall.

Cheile Turzii is one of the main rock climbing sites in Romania.

== Picture gallery ==
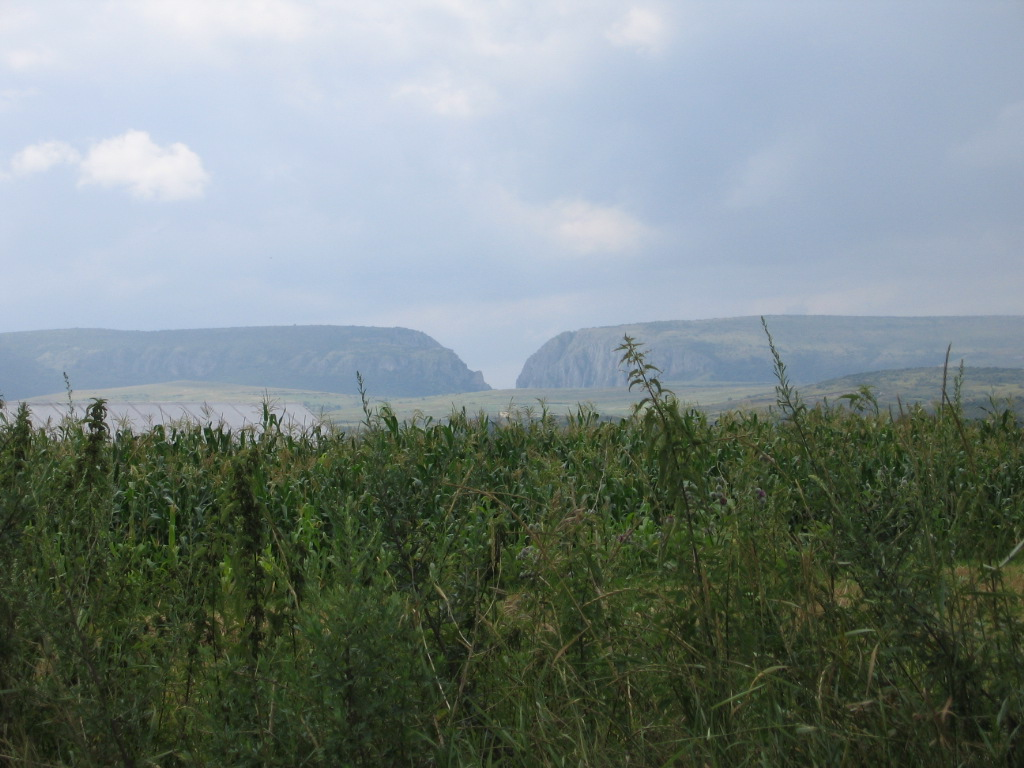
Turda Gorges seen from the west end

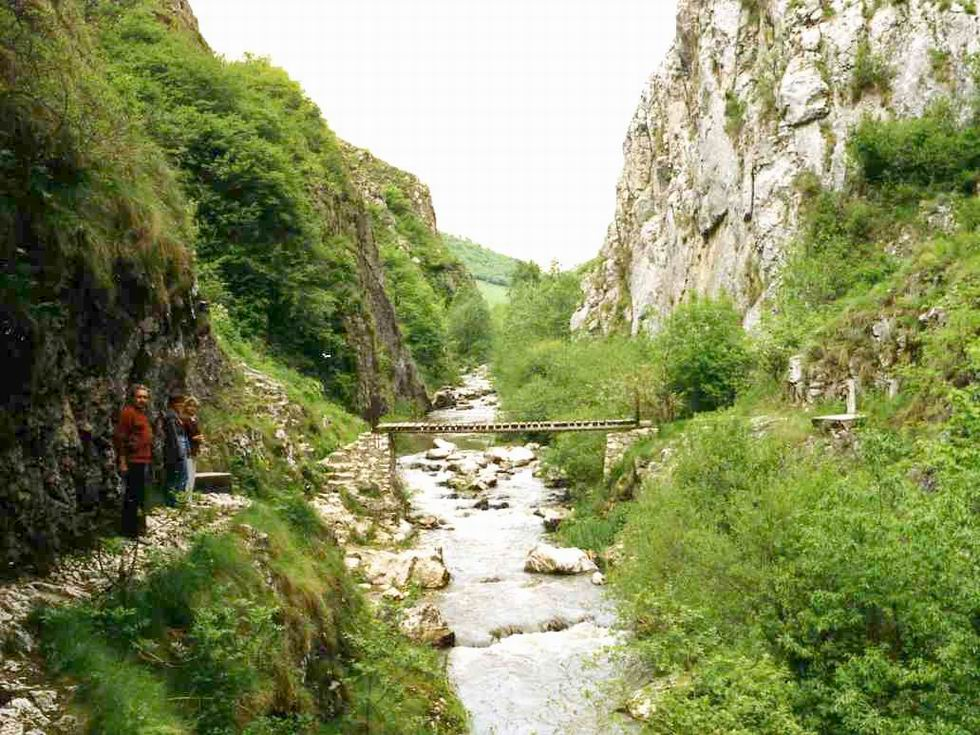
Cheile Turzii

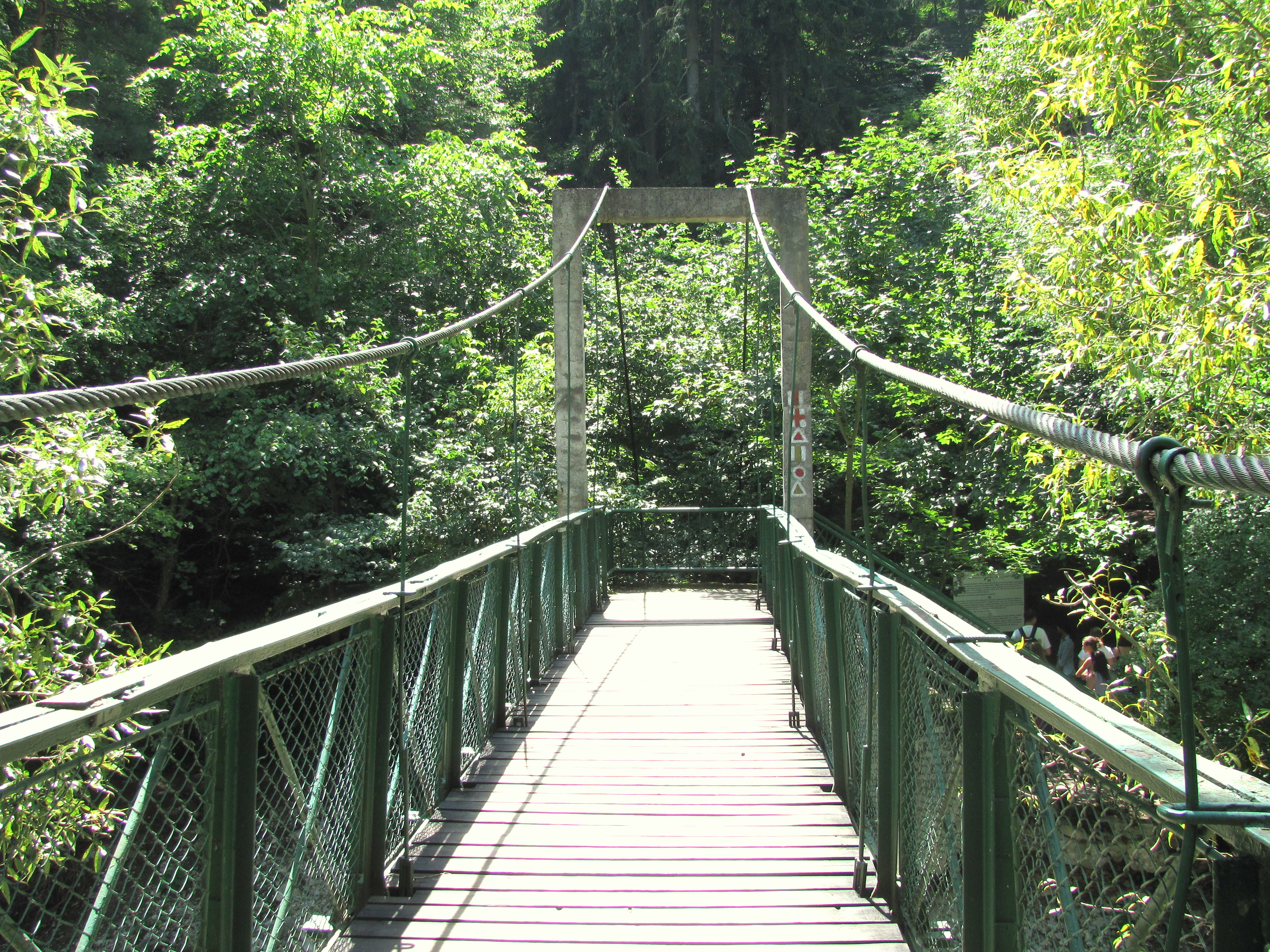
One of the bridges of Cheile Turzii

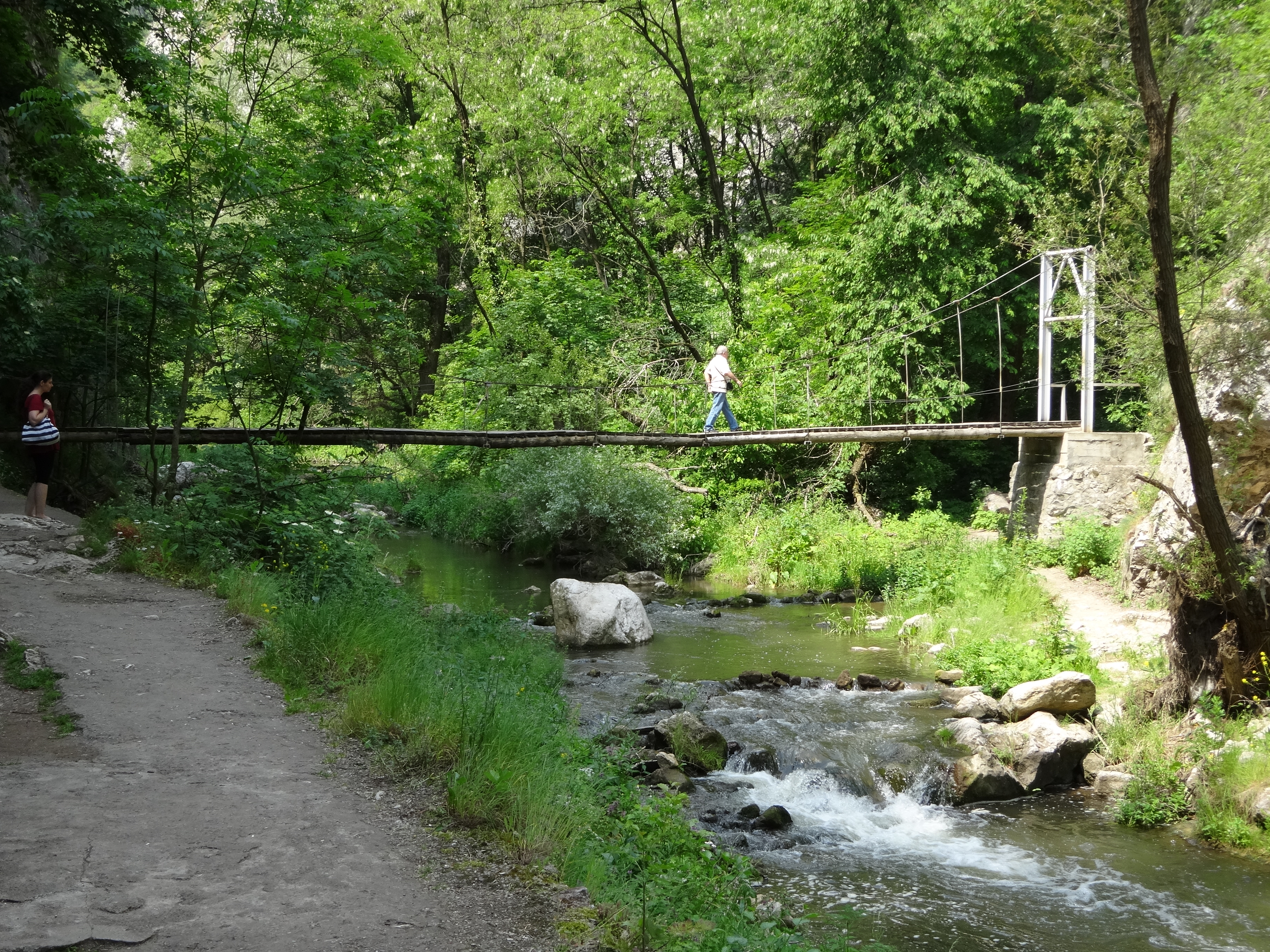

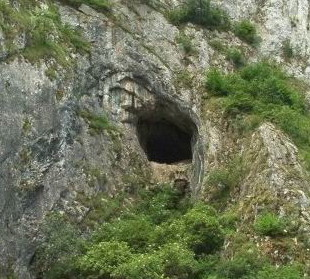
"Balica's Cave" in Cheile Turzii

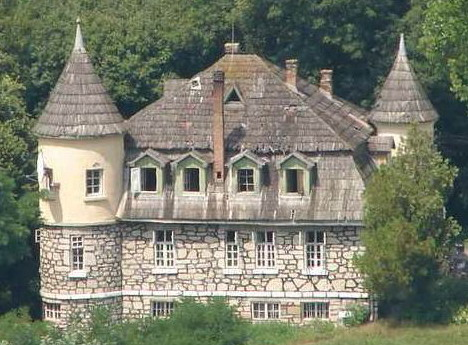
The chalet

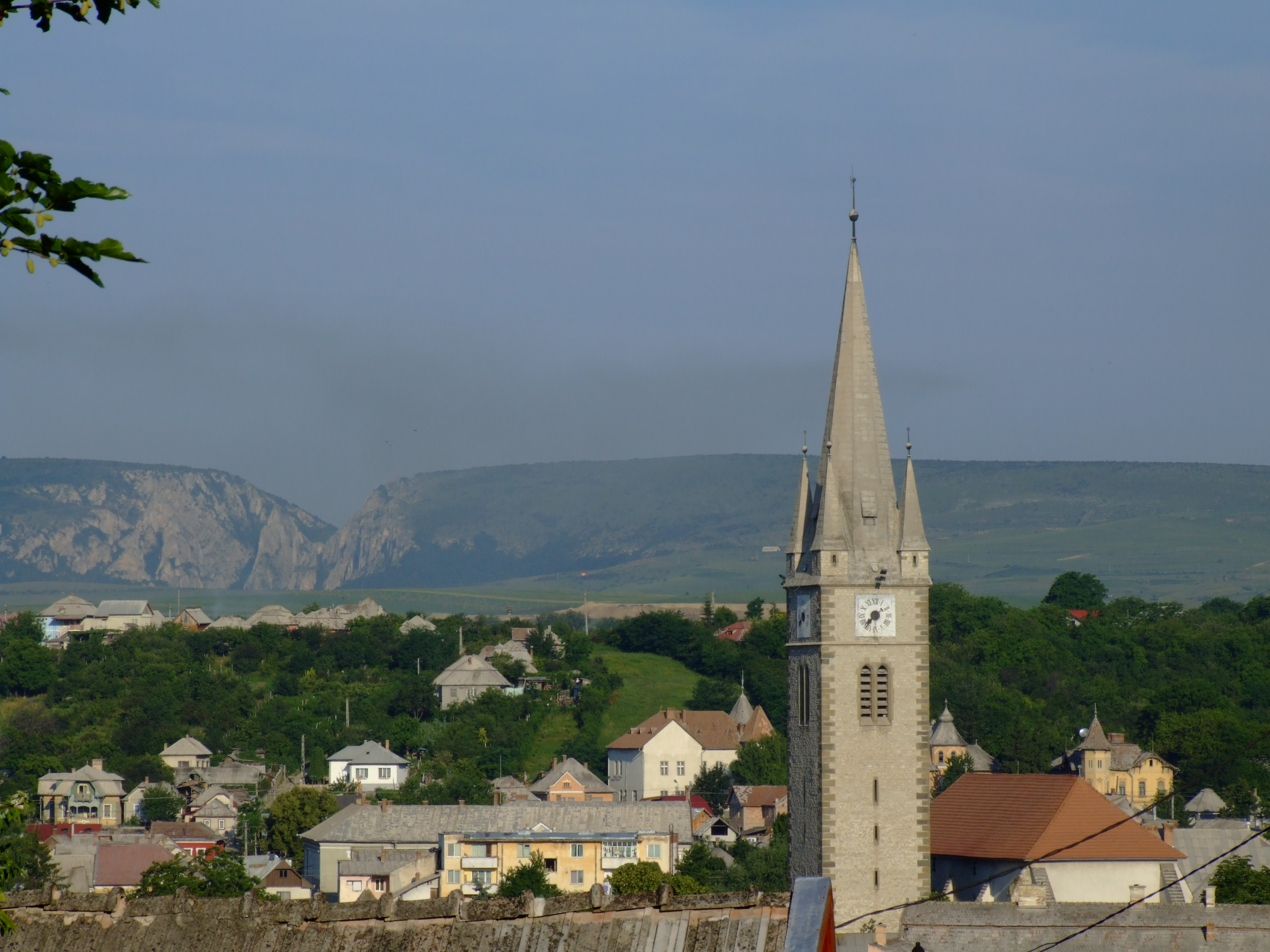
Cheile Turzii seen from Turda

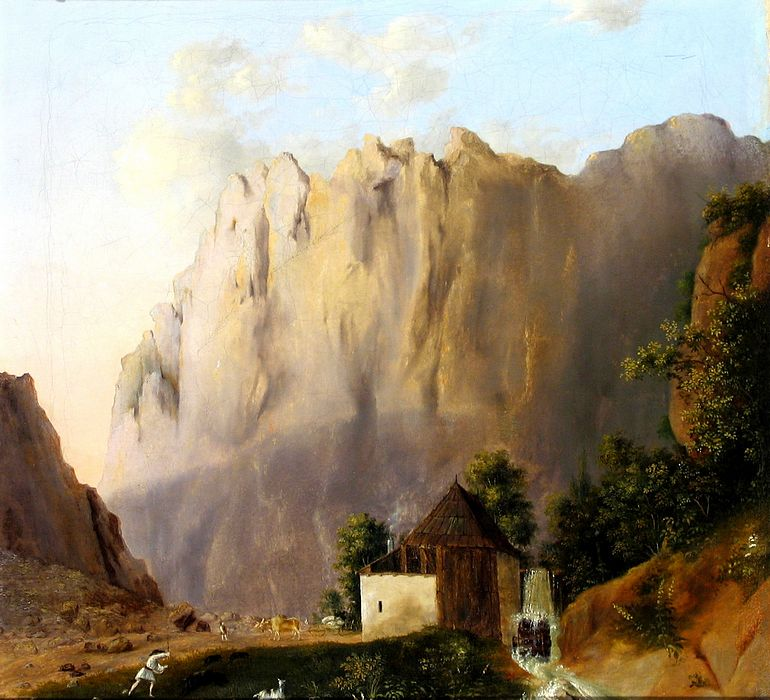
Henric Trenk's painting of Cheile Turzii

== See also ==
- Cheile Bicazului
- Salina Turda
- Tourism in Romania
- Huda lui Papara Cave
