= Negel (river) =

- Location within Romania

Location
- Country: Romania
- Counties: Bacău County
- Villages: Măgura, Mărgineni

Physical characteristics
- Mouth: Trebeș
  - location: Mărgineni
  - coordinates: 46°34′39″N 26°52′33″E
  - elevation: 178 m (584 ft)
- Length: 13 km (8.1 mi)
- Basin size: 26 km^{2} (10 sq mi)

Basin features
- Progression: Trebeș→ Bistrița→ Siret→ Danube→ Black Sea

The Negel is a right tributary of the river Trebeș in Romania. It flows into the Trebeș near Mărgineni. Its length is 13 km (8.1 mi) and its basin size is 26 km^{2} (10 sq mi).
