= Lueriu =

- Location within Romania

Location
- Country: Romania
- Counties: Mureș County
- Villages: Săcalu de Pădure, Luieriu

Physical characteristics
- Mouth: Mureș
  - coordinates: 46.8248°N 24.7483°E
- Length: 13 km (8.1 mi)
- Basin size: 31 km^{2} (12 sq mi)

Basin features
- Progression: Mureș→ Tisza→ Danube→ Black Sea

The Lueriu is a right tributary of the Mureș in Mureș County, Romania. It flows into the Mureș near Suseni. Its length is 13 km (8.1 mi) and its basin size is 31 km^{2} (12 sq mi).
