= Lupșa (Olt) =

- Location within Romania

Location
- Country: Romania
- Counties: Brașov County
- Villages: Lupșa, Cuciulata

Physical characteristics
- Mouth: Olt
  - location: Cuciulata
  - coordinates: 45.9323°N 25.2347°E
- Length: 14 km (8.7 mi)
- Basin size: 28 km^{2} (11 sq mi)

Basin features
- Progression: Olt→ Danube→ Black Sea

The Lupșa is a left tributary of the river Olt in Romania. It flows into the Olt near Cuciulata. Its length is 14 km (8.7 mi) and its basin size is 28 km^{2} (11 sq mi).
