= Orevița =

- Location within Romania

Location
- Country: Romania
- Counties: Caraș-Severin County
- Villages: Valea Orevița

Physical characteristics
- Mouth: Danube
  - location: Liubcova
  - coordinates: 44.6531°N 21.8870°E
- Length: 25 km (16 mi)
- Basin size: 102 km^{2} (39 sq mi)

Basin features
- Progression: Danube→ Black Sea
- Tributaries
  - right: Orevița Seacă

The Orevița is a small left tributary of the river Danube in Romania. It discharges into the Danube in Liubcova. Its length is 25 km (16 mi) and its basin size is 102 km^{2} (39 sq mi).
