= Moșna (Prut) =

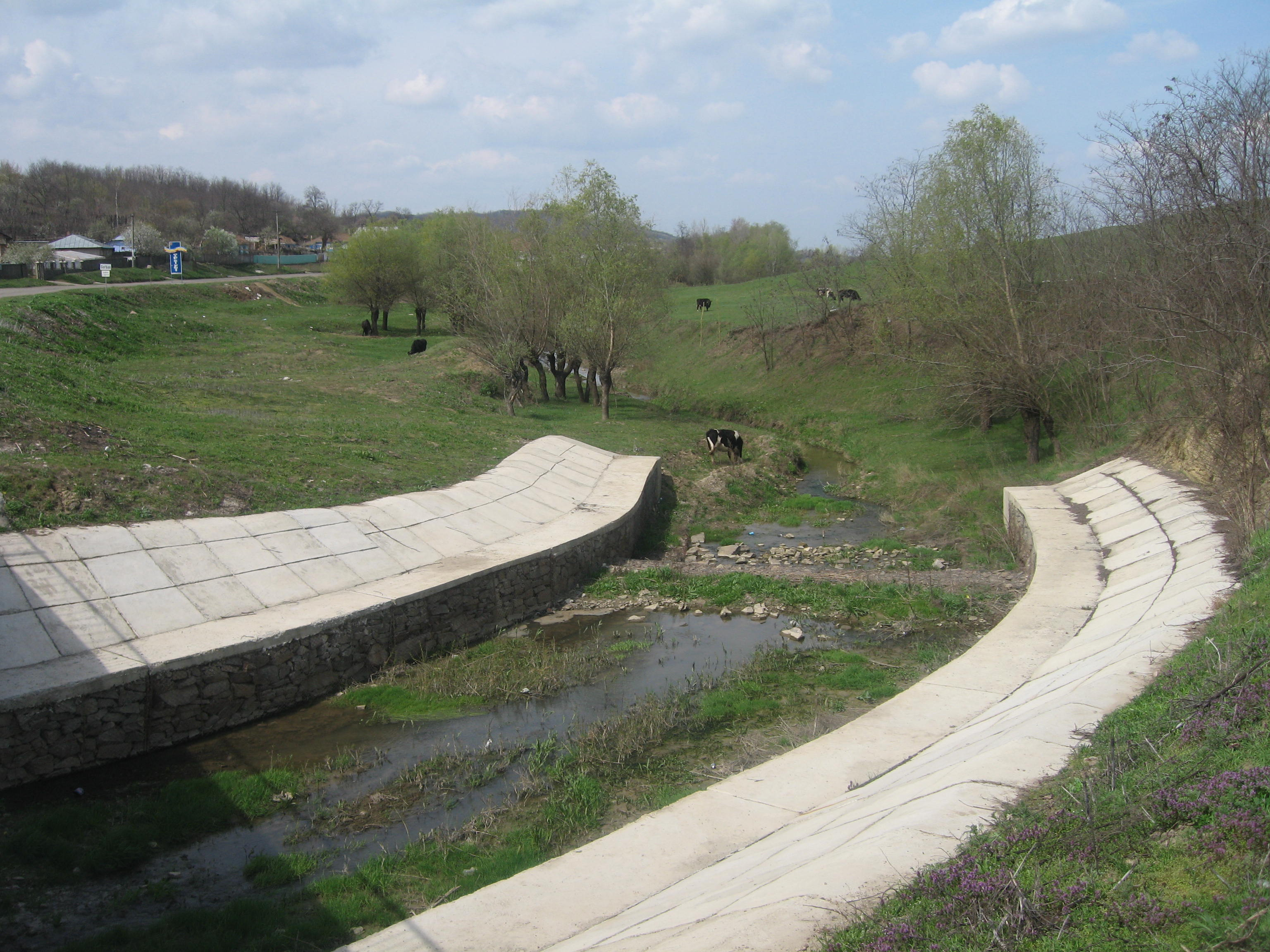

- Location within Romania

Location
- Country: Romania
- Counties: Iași County
- Villages: Moșna, Cozmești, Podu Hagiului

Physical characteristics
- Mouth: Prut
  - coordinates: 46.8696°N 28.0983°E
- Length: 18 km (11 mi)
- Basin size: 80 km^{2} (31 sq mi)

Basin features
- Progression: Prut→ Danube→ Black Sea
- Tributaries
  - left: Moșnișoara
- River code: XIII.1.17

The Moșna is a right tributary of the river Prut in Romania. It flows into the Prut near Gorban. Its length is 18 km (11 mi) and its basin size is 80 km^{2} (31 sq mi).
