= Mădărașul Mare =

- Location within Romania

Location
- Country: Romania
- Counties: Harghita County

Physical characteristics
- Mouth: Olt
  - coordinates: 46.4967°N 25.7507°E
- Length: 17 km (11 mi)
- Basin size: 62 km^{2} (24 sq mi)

Basin features
- Progression: Olt→ Danube→ Black Sea
- Tributaries
  - right: Șingai

The Mădărașul Mare is a right tributary of the river Olt in Romania. It discharges into the Olt in the village Mădăraș. Its length is 17 km (11 mi) and its basin size is 62 km^{2} (24 sq mi).
