= Leșunțul Mare =

- Location within Romania

Location
- Country: Romania
- Counties: Bacău County

Physical characteristics
- Mouth: Oituz
  - coordinates: 46.2005°N 26.5765°E
- Length: 11 km (6.8 mi)
- Basin size: 48 km^{2} (19 sq mi)

Basin features
- Progression: Oituz→ Trotuș→ Siret→ Danube→ Black Sea
- Tributaries
  - left: Leșunțul Mic

The Leșunțul Mare is a right tributary of the river Oituz in Romania. It discharges into the Oituz in Ferestrău-Oituz. Its length is 11 km (6.8 mi) and its basin size is 48 km^{2} (19 sq mi).
