= Oituz (river) =

- Location within Romania

Location
- Country: Romania
- Counties: Covasna, Bacău

Physical characteristics
- Source: Brețcu Mountains
- Mouth: Trotuș
  - location: Onești
  - coordinates: 46.2534°N 26.7571°E
- Length: 62 km (39 mi)
- Basin size: 337 km^{2} (130 sq mi)

Basin features
- Progression: Trotuș→ Siret→ Danube→ Black Sea
- Tributaries
  - left: Caraslău, Ghergheanoș, Brezoaia
  - right: Lupchianu, Haloș, Leșunțul Mare, Manciuc

The Oituz (Hungarian: Ojtoz) is a right tributary of the river Trotuș in Romania. It discharges into the Trotuș in Onești. The following towns and villages are situated along the river Oituz, from source to mouth: Oituz (CV), Poiana Sărată, Oituz (BC), Bogdănești and Onești. Its length is 62 km (39 mi) and its basin size is 337 km^{2} (130 sq mi).
