= Măieruș (river) =

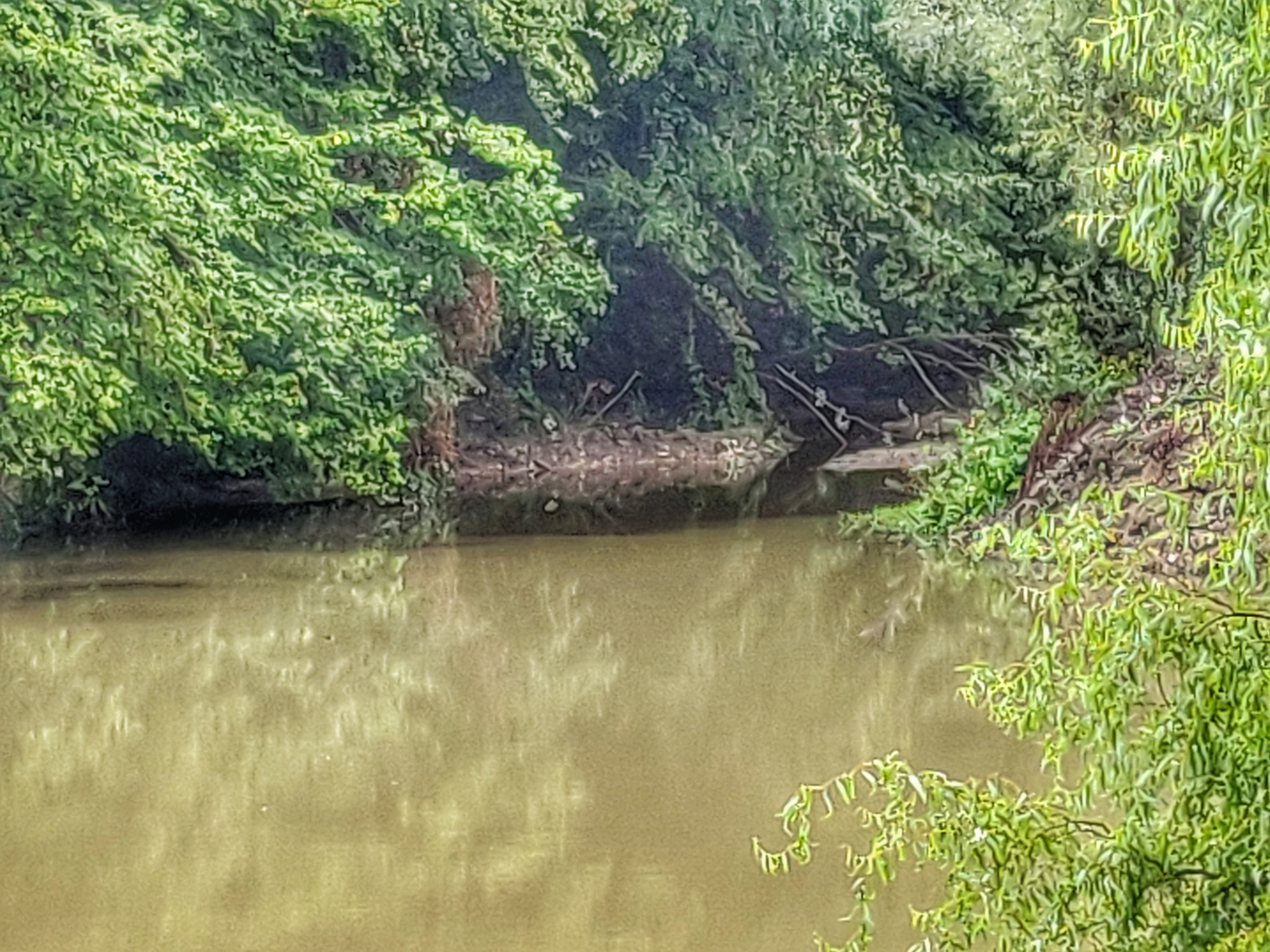

- Location within Romania

Location
- Country: Romania
- Counties: Brașov County
- Villages: Măieruș

Physical characteristics
- Mouth: Olt
  - location: Măieruș
  - coordinates: 45.8974°N 25.5460°E
- Length: 14 km (8.7 mi)
- Basin size: 27 km^{2} (10 sq mi)

Basin features
- Progression: Olt→ Danube→ Black Sea

The Măieruș is a left tributary of the river Olt in Romania. It flows into the Olt in the village Măieruș. Its length is 14 km (8.7 mi) and its basin size is 27 km^{2} (10 sq mi).
