= Nuntași =

- Location within Romania

Location
- Country: Romania
- Counties: Constanța County
- Villages: Fântânele, Tariverde, Nuntași

Physical characteristics
- Mouth: Lake Nuntași
  - coordinates: 44.5255°N 28.6927°E
- Length: 22 km (14 mi)
- Basin size: 145 km^{2} (56 sq mi)

Basin features
- Progression: Lake Nuntași→ Lake Sinoe→ Black Sea
- Tributaries
  - right: Cogealac
- River code: XV.1.7

The Nuntași is a river in Constanța County, Romania. Near the village Nuntași it flows into Lake Nuntași, which is connected with Lake Sinoe, a lagoon of the Black Sea. Its length is 22 km (14 mi) and its basin size is 145 km^{2} (56 sq mi).
