= Liborajdea =

- Location within Romania

Location
- Country: Romania
- Counties: Caraș-Severin County
- Villages: Liborajdea

Physical characteristics
- Mouth: Danube
  - coordinates: 44.6661°N 21.7761°E
- Length: 8 km (5.0 mi)
- Basin size: 39 km^{2} (15 sq mi)

Basin features
- Progression: Danube→ Black Sea

The Liborajdea is a small left tributary of the Danube in Romania. It flows into the Danube near the village Liborajdea. Its length is 8 km (5.0 mi) and its basin size is 39 km^{2} (15 sq mi).
