= Ociu =

- Location within Romania

Location
- Country: Romania
- Counties: Arad, Hunedoara
- Villages: Țohești, Ocișor

Physical characteristics
- Mouth: Crișul Alb
  - location: Ocișor
  - coordinates: 46.2242°N 22.5610°E
- Length: 11 km (6.8 mi)
- Basin size: 16 km^{2} (6.2 sq mi)

Basin features
- Progression: Crișul Alb→ Körös→ Tisza→ Danube→ Black Sea

The Ociu is a right tributary of the river Crișul Alb in Romania. It discharges into the Crișul Alb in Ocișor. Its length is 11 km (6.8 mi) and its basin size is 16 km^{2} (6.2 sq mi).
