= Nămolești =

- Location within Romania

Location
- Country: Romania
- Counties: Constanța County

Physical characteristics
- Mouth: Danube
  - coordinates: 44.7844°N 28.0689°E
- Length: 20 km (12 mi)
- Basin size: 104 km^{2} (40 sq mi)

Basin features
- Progression: Danube→ Black Sea
- River code: XIV.1.47a

The Nămolești is a right tributary of the Danube in Romania. It flows into the Danube near Gârliciu. Its length is 20 km (12 mi) and its basin size is 104 km^{2} (40 sq mi).
