= Molnița =

- Location within Romania Location within Chernivtsi Oblast

Location
- Country: Ukraine, Romania
- Counties: Chernivtsi O., Botoșani C.

Physical characteristics
- Mouth: Siret
  - coordinates: 47.8971°N 26.2271°E
- Discharge
  - location: *
  - minimum: 0 m^{3}/s (0 cu ft/s)
  - maximum: 15.30 m^{3}/s (540 cu ft/s)

Basin features
- Progression: Siret→ Danube→ Black Sea
- Tributaries
  - left: Vlădeni

The Molnița is a left tributary of the river Siret in Ukraine and Romania. Its source is located near the village Stanivtsi, Chernivtsi Oblast, Ukraine. The Molnița crosses the border into Romania, and discharges into the Siret near Talpa. In Romania, its length is 15 km (9.3 mi) and its basin size is 48 km^{2} (19 sq mi).
