= Leșnic =

Leșnic Lesnyek-patak
- Location within Romania

Location
- Country: Romania
- Counties: Hunedoara County
- Villages: Leșnic

Physical characteristics
- Mouth: Mureș
  - location: Leșnic
  - coordinates: 45.9243°N 22.7388°E
- Length: 13 km (8.1 mi)
- Basin size: 31 km^{2} (12 sq mi)

Basin features
- Progression: Mureș→ Tisza→ Danube→ Black Sea

The Leșnic (Hungarian: Lesnyek-patak) is a left tributary of the river Mureș in Romania. It discharges into the Mureș in the village Leșnic. Its length is 13 km (8.1 mi) and its basin size is 31 km^{2} (12 sq mi).
