= Martonca =

Martonca Martonka-patak
- Location within Romania

Location
- Country: Romania
- Counties: Harghita County
- Villages: Făgețel, Martonca

Physical characteristics
- Source: Gurghiu Mountains
- Mouth: Mureș
  - coordinates: 46.8487°N 25.4486°E
- Length: 14 km (8.7 mi)
- Basin size: 24 km^{2} (9.3 sq mi)

Basin features
- Progression: Mureș→ Tisza→ Danube→ Black Sea
- Tributaries
  - right: Lucaci

The Martonca (Hungarian: Martonka-patak, from the name "Martin") is a left tributary of the river Mureș in Transylvania, Romania. It discharges into the Mureș near Subcetate. Its length is 14 km (8.7 mi) and its basin size is 24 km^{2} (9.3 sq mi).
