= Lișcov =

- Location within Romania

Location
- Country: Romania
- Counties: Vaslui, Galați
- Villages: Mânăstirea, Blăgești, Cavadinești

Physical characteristics
- Mouth: Horincea
  - coordinates: 46.0488°N 28.0458°E
- Length: 21 km (13 mi)
- Basin size: 37 km^{2} (14 sq mi)

Basin features
- Progression: Horincea→ Prut→ Danube→ Black Sea
- River code: XIII.1.23.2

The Lișcov is a left tributary of the river Horincea in Romania. It flows into the Horincea near Cavadinești. Its length is 21 km (13 mi) and its basin size is 37 km^{2} (14 sq mi).
