= Lunca (Olt) =

- Location within Romania

Location
- Country: Romania
- Counties: Harghita County

Physical characteristics
- Mouth: Olt
  - location: Cârța
  - coordinates: 46.5375°N 25.7597°E
- Length: 12 km (7.5 mi)
- Basin size: 35 km^{2} (14 sq mi)

Basin features
- Progression: Olt→ Danube→ Black Sea
- Tributaries
  - right: Rața

The Lunca is a right tributary of the river Olt in Romania. It discharges into the Olt in Cârța. Its length is 12 km (7.5 mi) and its basin size is 35 km^{2} (14 sq mi).
