= Monoroștia =

Monoroștia Monorostyai-patak
- Location within Romania

Location
- Country: Romania
- Counties: Arad County
- Villages: Monoroștia

Physical characteristics
- Mouth: Mureș
  - location: Monoroștia
  - coordinates: 46.0913°N 22.0102°E
- Length: 12 km (7.5 mi)
- Basin size: 31 km^{2} (12 sq mi)

Basin features
- Progression: Mureș→ Tisza→ Danube→ Black Sea

The Monoroștia (Hungarian: Monorostyai-patak) is a right tributary of the river Mureș in Romania. It discharges into the Mureș in the village Monoroștia. Its length is 12 km (7.5 mi) and its basin size is 31 km^{2} (12 sq mi).
