= Limpedea =

- Location within Romania

Location
- Country: Romania
- Counties: Bacău County
- Villages: Gârleni, Hemeiuș

Physical characteristics
- Mouth: Trebeș
  - location: near Bacău
  - coordinates: 46.5909°N 26.9017°E
- Length: 16 km (9.9 mi)
- Basin size: 47 km^{2} (18 sq mi)

Basin features
- Progression: Trebeș→ Bistrița→ Siret→ Danube→ Black Sea

The Limpedea is a left tributary of the river Trebeș in Romania. It flows into the Trebeș near the city Bacău. Its length is 16 km (9.9 mi) and its basin size is 47 km^{2} (18 sq mi).
