= Moașa =

Moașa Moașa Sebeșului
- Location within Romania

Location
- Country: Romania
- Counties: Sibiu County
- Villages: Sebeșu de Sus

Physical characteristics
- Mouth: Sebeș
  - coordinates: 45.6684°N 24.3185°E
- Length: 13 km (8.1 mi)
- Basin size: 23 km^{2} (8.9 sq mi)

Basin features
- Progression: Sebeș→ Olt→ Danube→ Black Sea
- Tributaries
  - left: Valea Tătarului

The Moașa (also: Moașa Sebeșului) is a right tributary of the river Sebeș in Romania. It discharges into the Sebeș close to its outflow into the Olt, near Racovița. Its length is 13 km (8.1 mi) and its basin size is 23 km^{2} (8.9 sq mi).
