= Ocoliș (Arieș) =

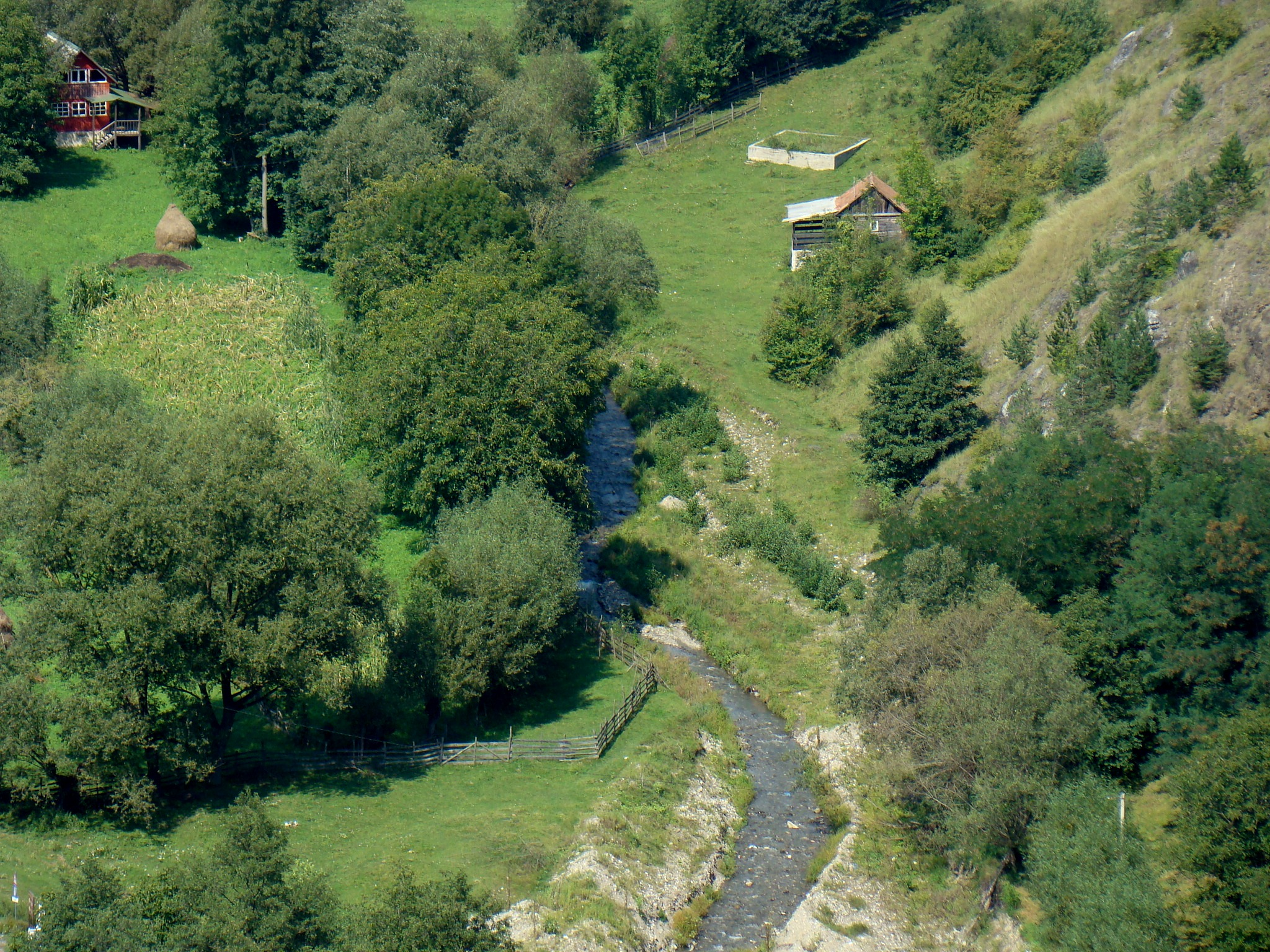

- Location within Romania

Location
- Country: Romania
- Counties: Alba County
- Villages: Lunca Largă, Runc, Ocoliș

Physical characteristics
- Mouth: Arieș
  - location: Ocoliș
  - coordinates: 46.468°N 23.477°E
- Length: 14 km (8.7 mi)
- Basin size: 67 km^{2} (26 sq mi)

Basin features
- Progression: Arieș→ Mureș→ Tisza→ Danube→ Black Sea
- Tributaries
  - right: Tisa, Pociovaliștea, Craca

The Ocoliș is a small river in the Apuseni Mountains, Alba County, western Romania. It is a left tributary of the river Arieș. It flows through Ocoliș commune, and joins the Arieș in the village Ocoliș. It is fed by several smaller streams, including Tisa, Pociovaliștea, and Craca. Its length is 14 km (8.7 mi) and its basin size is 67 km^{2} (26 sq mi).
