= Mălina =

- Location within Romania

Location
- Country: Romania
- Counties: Galați County
- Villages: Smârdan

Physical characteristics
- Mouth: Siret
  - location: Șendreni
  - coordinates: 45.4042°N 27.9532°E
- Length: 33 km (21 mi)
- Basin size: 183 km^{2} (71 sq mi)

Basin features
- Progression: Siret→ Danube→ Black Sea
- Tributaries
  - left: Jorea, Valea lui Manolache

The Mălina is a left tributary of the river Siret in Romania. It discharges into the Siret in Movileni, near the city of Galați. The basin size of the 33 km (21 mi) long Mălina is 183 km^{2} (71 sq mi).
