= Suceveni =

- Commune
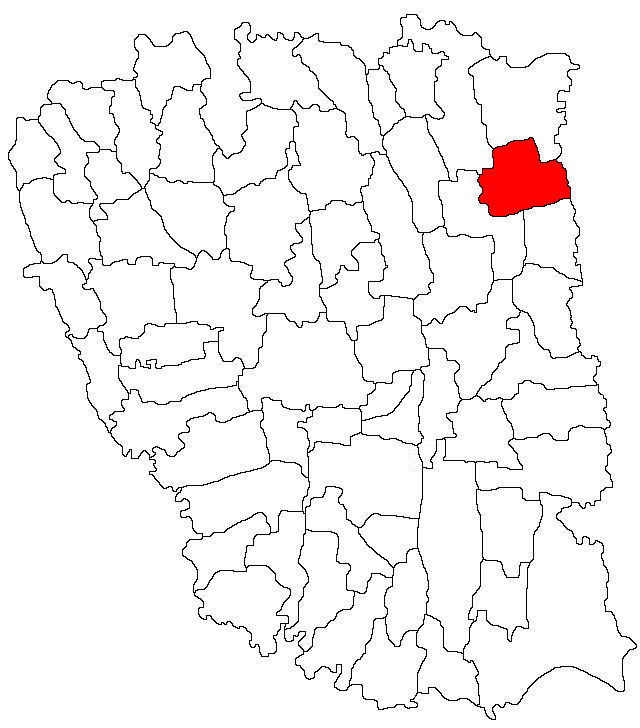
- Location in Galați County

- Location in Romania
- Coordinates: 46°1′N 28°2′E
- Country: Romania
- County: Galați
- Population (2021-12-01): 1,491
- Time zone: EET/EEST (UTC+2/+3)
- Vehicle reg.: GL

Suceveni is a commune in Galați County, Western Moldavia, Romania with a population of 1,819 people. It is composed of two villages, Rogojeni and Suceveni.

== Natives ==
- Spiridon Popescu
