= Vața de Jos =

- Commune
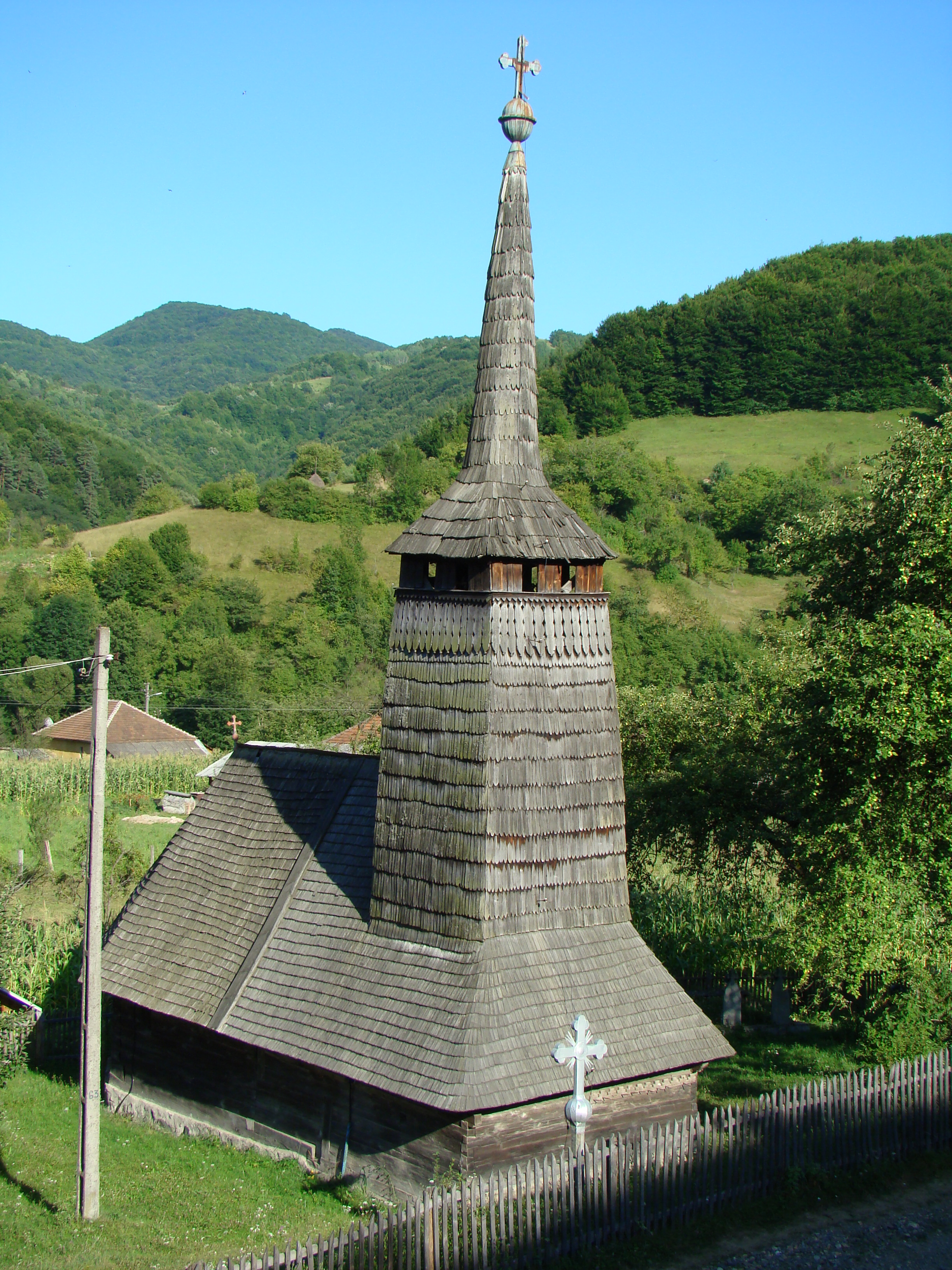
- Wooden church of the Pentecost in Căzănești

- Location in Hunedoara County

- Location in Romania
- Coordinates: 46°11′N 22°36′E
- Country: Romania
- County: Hunedoara

Government
  - Mayor (2024–2028): Liviu Ioan Lință (PNL)
- Area: 202.63 km^{2} (78.24 sq mi)
- Elevation: 233 m (764 ft)
- Population (2021-12-01): 3,163
  - Density: 15.61/km^{2} (40.43/sq mi)
- Time zone: UTC+02:00 (EET)
  - Summer (DST): UTC+03:00 (EEST)
- Postal code: 337514
- Area code: (+40) 02 54
- Vehicle reg.: HD
- Website: primariavatadejos.ro

Vața de Jos (Hungarian: Alváca) is a commune in Hunedoara County, Transylvania, Romania. It is composed of thirteen villages: Basarabasa (Baszarabásza), Birtin (Birtin), Brotuna (Brotuna), Căzănești (Kazanesd), Ciungani (Csungány), Ocișor (Ócsisor), Ociu (Olcs), Prăvăleni (Prevaleny), Prihodiște (Prihodest), Tătărăștii de Criș (Tataresd), Târnava de Criș (Ternáva), Vața de Jos, and Vața de Sus (Felváca).

The commune is located in the northern part of Hunedoara County, about 19 km (12 mi) west of the town of Brad and 56 km (35 mi) northwest of the county seat, Deva, on the border with Arad County. It is traversed by the European route E79.

Vața de Jos is situated in a hilly area northeast of the northeast of the Zarand Mountains, in the upper reaches of the Crișul Alb River. It is crossed by several tributaries of this river: the Prăvăleni flows through Ciungani, Prăvăleni, and Basarabasa villages and discharges into the Crișul Alb in Târnava de Criș, as does the Obârșa, while the Ociu discharges into the Crișul Alb in Ocișor village.

Historical population
Year	Pop.	±%
1910	7,421	—
2002	4,293	−42.2%
2011	3,728	−13.2%
2021	3,163	−15.2%
Source: Census data

== Natives ==
- Arsenie Boca (1910–1989), priest, theologian, mystic, and artist
- Roman Codreanu (1952–2001), super-heavyweight Greco-Roman wrestler
