= Tomești, Hunedoara =

Tomești
- Commune
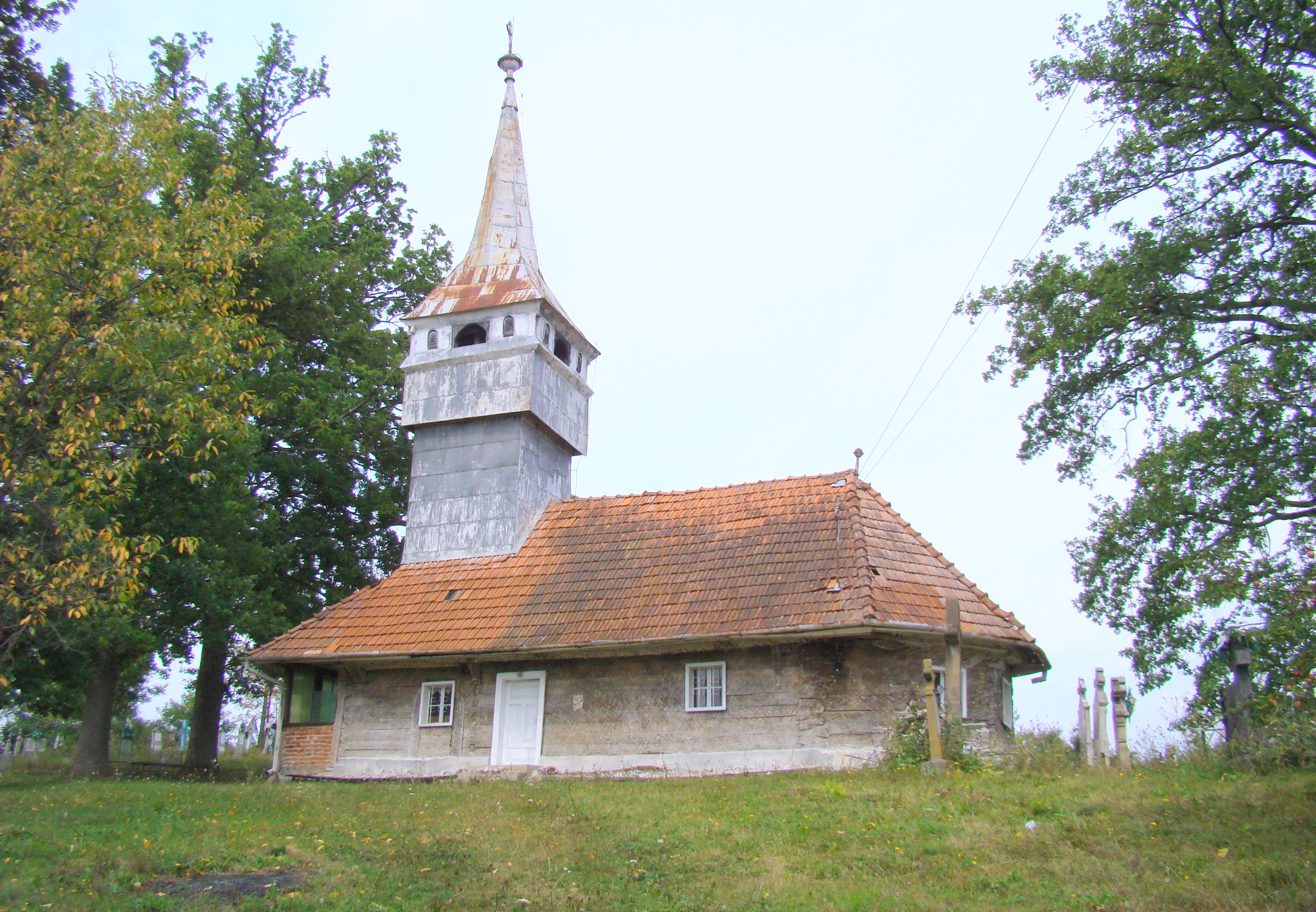
- Wooden church in Tiulești

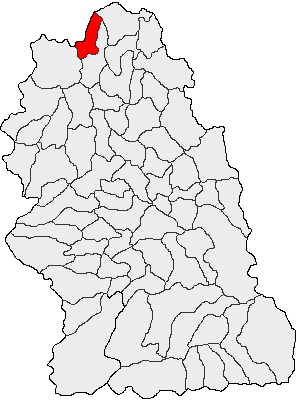
- Location in Hunedoara County

- Location in Romania
- Coordinates: 46.215°N 22.665°E
- Country: Romania
- County: Hunedoara

Government
  - Mayor (2024–2028): Adrian Viorel Vasiu (PNL)
- Area: 59.42 km^{2} (22.94 sq mi)
- Elevation: 264 m (866 ft)
- Population (2021-12-01): 912
  - Density: 15.3/km^{2} (39.8/sq mi)
- Time zone: UTC+02:00 (EET)
  - Summer (DST): UTC+03:00 (EEST)
- Postal code: 337470
- Area code: (+40) 0254
- Vehicle reg.: HD
- Website: primariatomestihd.ro

Tomești (Hungarian: Tomesd, German: Thomsdorf) is a commune in Hunedoara County, Transylvania, Romania. It is composed of eight villages: Dobroț (Dobroc), Leauț (Lyauc), Livada (Sztrimba), Obârșa (Obersia), Șteia (Steja), Tiulești (Tyiulesd), Tomești, and Valea Mare de Criș (Valeamare).

Historical population
Year	Pop.	±%
1941	2,644	—
2002	1,298	−50.9%
2011	1,075	−17.2%
2021	912	−15.2%
Source: Census data
