= Ocoliș =

- Commune
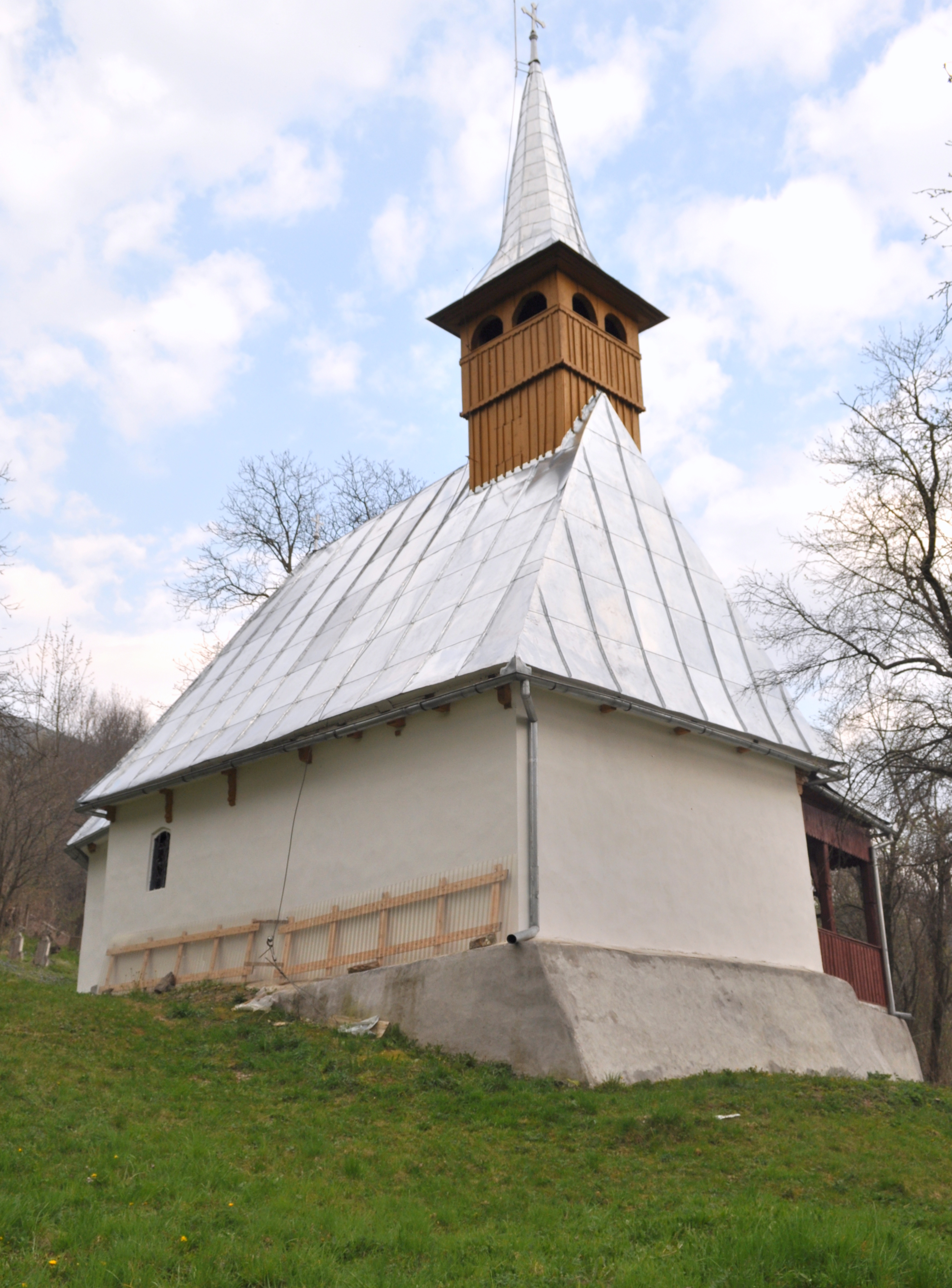
- Church in Runc

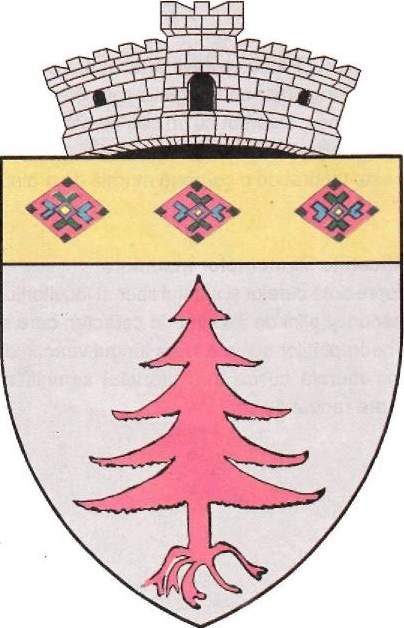
- Coat of arms

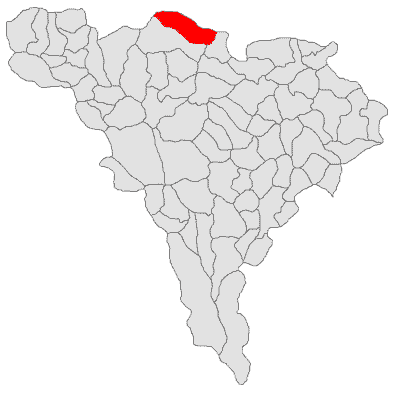
- Location in Alba County

- Location in Romania
- Coordinates: 46.4764°N 23.4681°E
- Country: Romania
- County: Alba

Government
  - Mayor (2020–2024): Alin Alexandru Jucan (PNL)
- Area: 85.79 km^{2} (33.12 sq mi)
- Elevation: 569 m (1,867 ft)
- Population (2021-12-01): 479
  - Density: 5.58/km^{2} (14.5/sq mi)
- Time zone: UTC+02:00 (EET)
  - Summer (DST): UTC+03:00 (EEST)
- Postal code: 517525
- Area code: (+40) 02 58
- Vehicle reg.: AB
- Website: ocolis-ab.ro

Ocoliș (German: Zaundorf; Hungarian: Alsóaklos) is a commune located in Alba County, Transylvania, Romania. It is composed of four villages: Lunca Largă (Lunkalárga), Ocoliș, Runc (Aronyosronk), and Vidolm (Vidaly).

The commune is situated in the northern part of the county, between the Trascău Mountains and Muntele Mare. It lies on the border with Cluj County, some 20 km (12 mi) from Baia de Arieș and 100 km (62 mi) from the county seat, Alba Iulia.

The river Arieș flows through Vidolm village for a length of 5 km (3.1 mi). The river Ocoliș is a left tributary of the Arieș; it flows through the commune, and joins the Arieș in Ocoliș village.

In July 2021, rains and storms destroyed three houses and severely damaged another 20 in Ocoliș. More than 220 liters of precipitation per square meter fell in the area in five hours. Dozens of people had to be evacuated because of the resulting floods.

Historical population
Year	Pop.	±%
2002	846	—
2011	616	−27.2%
2021	479	−22.2%
Source: Census data

At the 2021 census, the commune had a population of 479, of which 92.69% were Romanians. As of 2025, there have been no births registered since then in Ocoliș.
