= Cavadinești =

- Commune
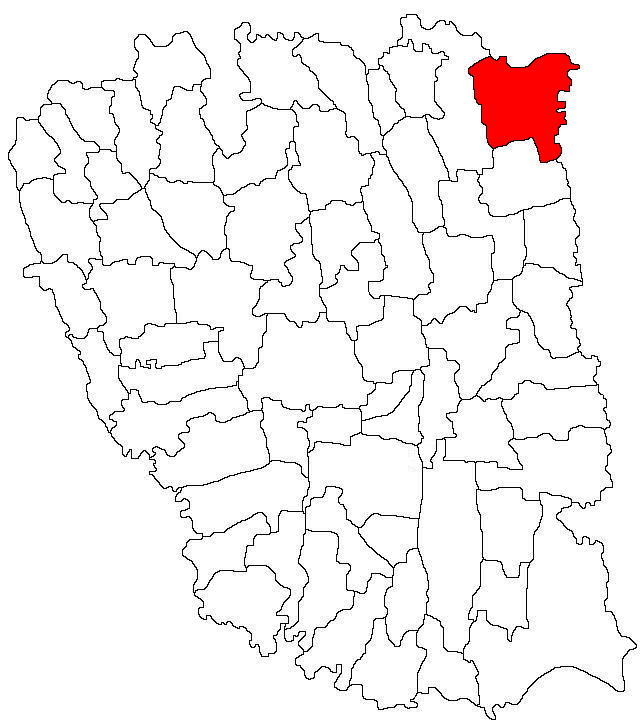
- Location in Galați County

- Location in Romania
- Coordinates: 46°4′N 28°1′E
- Country: Romania
- County: Galați

Government
  - Mayor (2024–2028): Benone Ichim (PSD)
- Area: 110.86 km^{2} (42.80 sq mi)
- Elevation: 90 m (300 ft)
- Population (2021-12-01): 2,445
  - Density: 22.05/km^{2} (57.12/sq mi)
- Time zone: UTC+02:00 (EET)
  - Summer (DST): UTC+03:00 (EEST)
- Postal code: 807065
- Area code: (+40) 0236
- Vehicle reg.: GL
- Website: primariacavadinesti.ro

Cavadinești is a commune in Galați County, Western Moldavia, Romania. It is composed of four villages: Cavadinești, Comănești, Gănești, and Vădeni.

Historical population
Year	Pop.	±%
2002	3,557	—
2011	3,125	−12.1%
2021	2,445	−21.8%
Source: Census data

At the 2021 census, the commune had a population of 2,445; of those, 90.59% were Romanians and 1.1% Roma.
