= Mărgineni, Bacău =

Mărgineni
- Commune
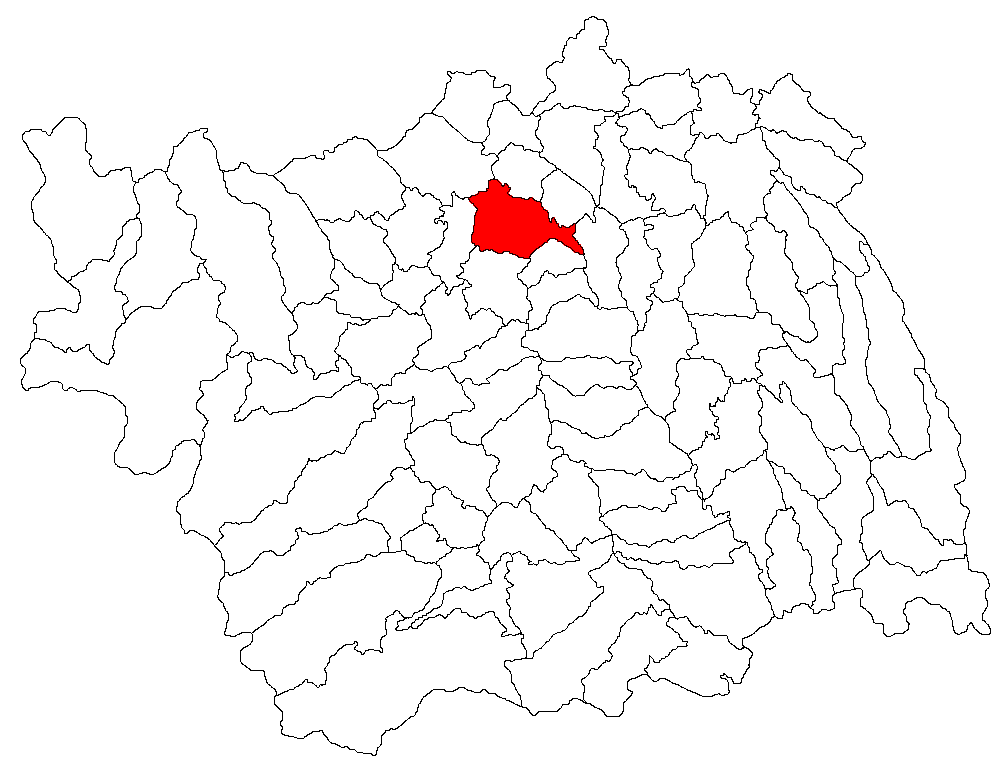
- Location in Bacău County

- Location in Romania
- Country: Romania
- County: Bacău

Government
  - Mayor (2024–2028): Ioan Gheorgheș (PNL)
- Area: 83.48 km^{2} (32.23 sq mi)
- Elevation: 194 m (636 ft)
- Population (2021-12-01): 9,594
  - Density: 114.9/km^{2} (297.7/sq mi)
- Time zone: UTC+02:00 (EET)
  - Summer (DST): UTC+03:00 (EEST)
- Postal code: 607315
- Area code: +(40) 234
- Vehicle reg.: BC
- Website: primaria-margineni.ro

Mărgineni (Hungarian: Marzsinén) is a commune in Bacău County, Western Moldavia, Romania. It is composed of eight villages: Barați (Barát), Luncani (Lunkány), Mărgineni, Pădureni, Podiș, Poiana, Trebeș (Terebes), and Valea Budului.

At the 2002 census, the commune had 8,132 inhabitants, 99.8% of which were ethnic Romanians; 57.5% were Roman Catholic and 41.9% Romanian Orthodox. At the 2011 census, the population had decreased to 7,993, while at the 2021 census, it had increased to 9,594.

== Natives ==
- Constantin Cândea (1887 – 1971), chemist, Rector of the Polytechnic University of Timișoara
- Ioan Măric (born 1945 in Luncani), painter
- Alexandru Piru (1917 – 1993), literary critic and historian
