= Petreștii de Jos =

- Commune
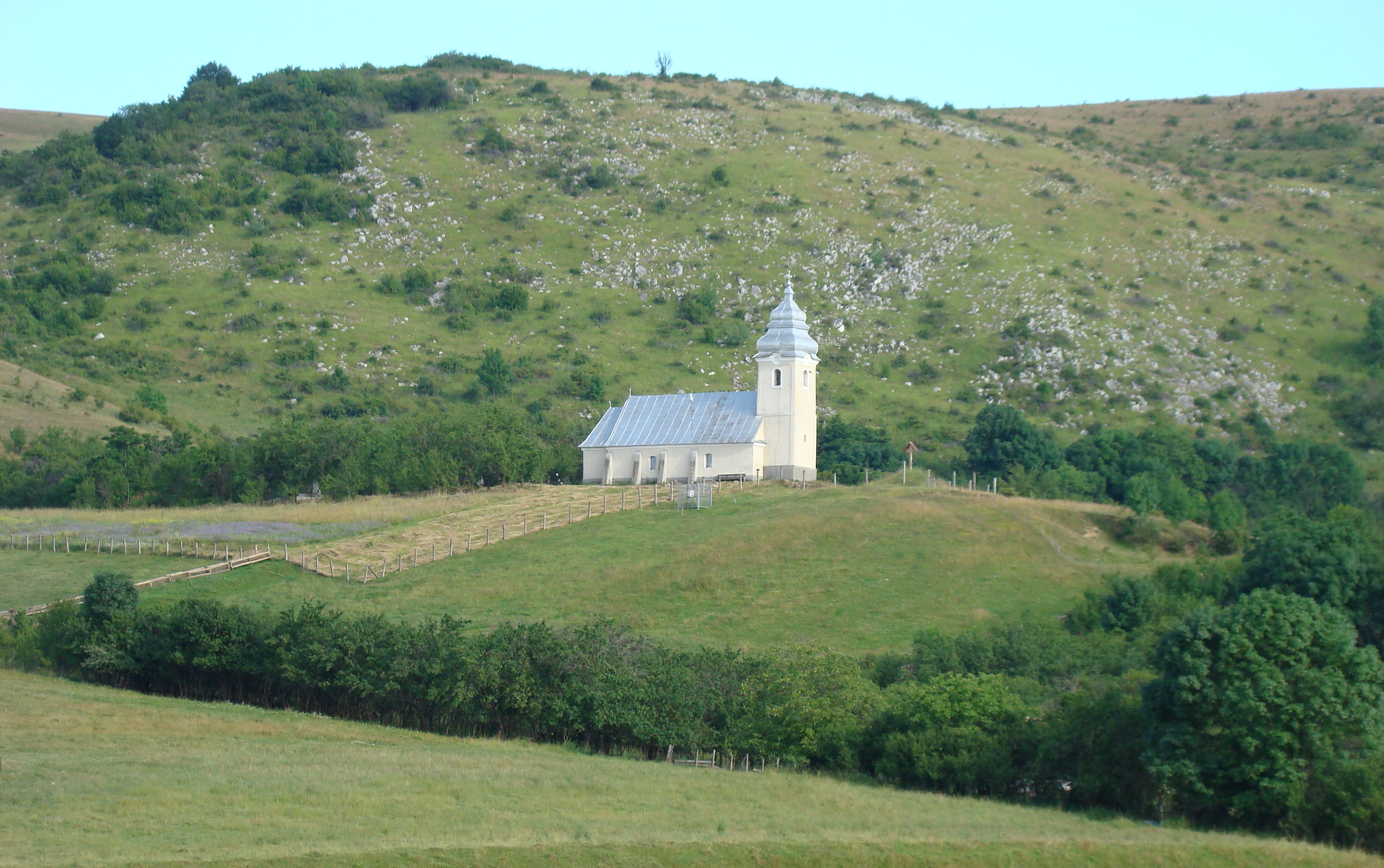
- Orthodox church in Petreștii de Sus

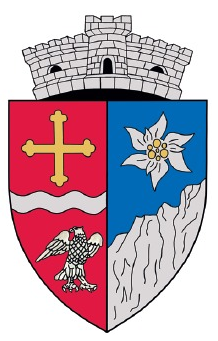
- Coat of arms

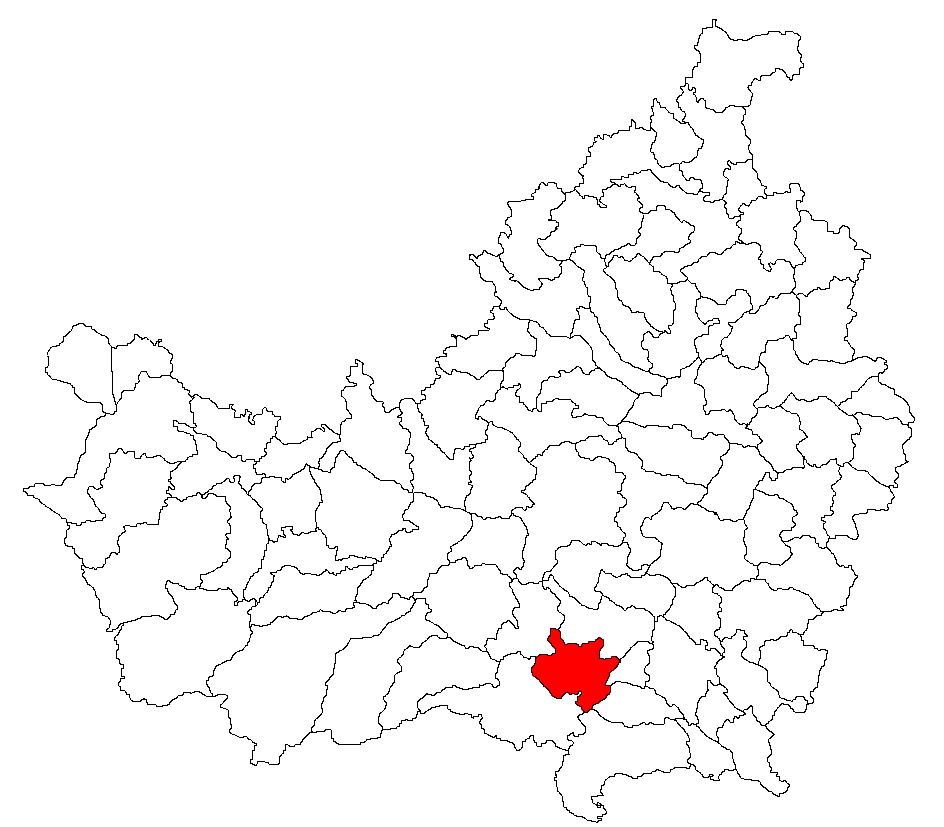
- Location in Cluj County

- Location in Romania
- Coordinates: 46°34′51″N 23°39′19″E
- Country: Romania
- County: Cluj
- Subdivisions: Crăești, Deleni, Livada, Petreștii de Jos, Petreștii de Mijloc, Petreștii de Sus, Plaiuri

Government
  - Mayor (2024–2028): Teodora-Roxana Teutișan (AUR)
- Area: 72.61 km^{2} (28.03 sq mi)
- Elevation: 474 m (1,555 ft)
- Population (2021-12-01): 1,391
  - Density: 19.16/km^{2} (49.62/sq mi)
- Time zone: UTC+02:00 (EET)
  - Summer (DST): UTC+03:00 (EEST)
- Postal code: 407455
- Area code: (+40) 0264
- Vehicle reg.: CJ
- Website: petrestiidejos.ro

Petreștii de Jos (Hungarian: Magyarpeterd; German: Ungarisch-Petersdorf) is a commune in Cluj County, Transylvania, Romania. It is composed of seven villages: Crăești (Pusztaszentkirály), Deleni (Indal), Livada (Tordaegres), Petreștii de Jos, Petreștii de Mijloc (Középpeterd), Petreștii de Sus (Felsőpeterd), and Plaiuri (Tordahagymás).

== Demographics ==
According to the census from 2011, there was a total population of 1,512 people living in this commune, of which 93.25% were ethnic Romanians and 2.58% ethnic Roma. At the 2021 census, Petreștii de Jos had a population of 1,391; of those, 88.86% were Romanians.
