= Lotrișor (Călimănești) =

- Location within Romania

Location
- Country: Romania
- Counties: Vâlcea County

Physical characteristics
- Mouth: Olt
  - coordinates: 45.3034°N 24.2867°E
- Length: 7 km (4.3 mi)
- Basin size: 16 km^{2} (6.2 sq mi)

Basin features
- Progression: Olt→ Danube→ Black Sea
- Tributaries
  - right: Galbenu

The Lotrișor is a right tributary of the river Olt in Romania. It discharges into the Olt north of Călimănești. Its length is 7 km (4.3 mi) and its basin size is 16 km^{2} (6.2 sq mi). The Lotrișor flows through the Cozia National Park, located in south-central Romania.
