= Coronini =

- Commune
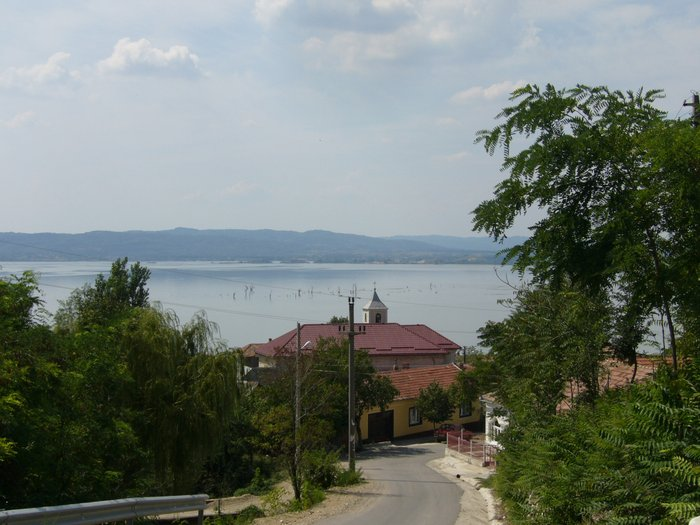
- View over Coronini and the Danube

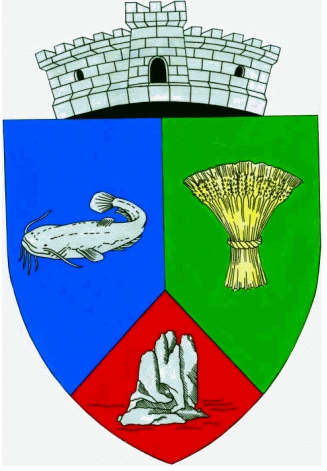
- Coat of arms

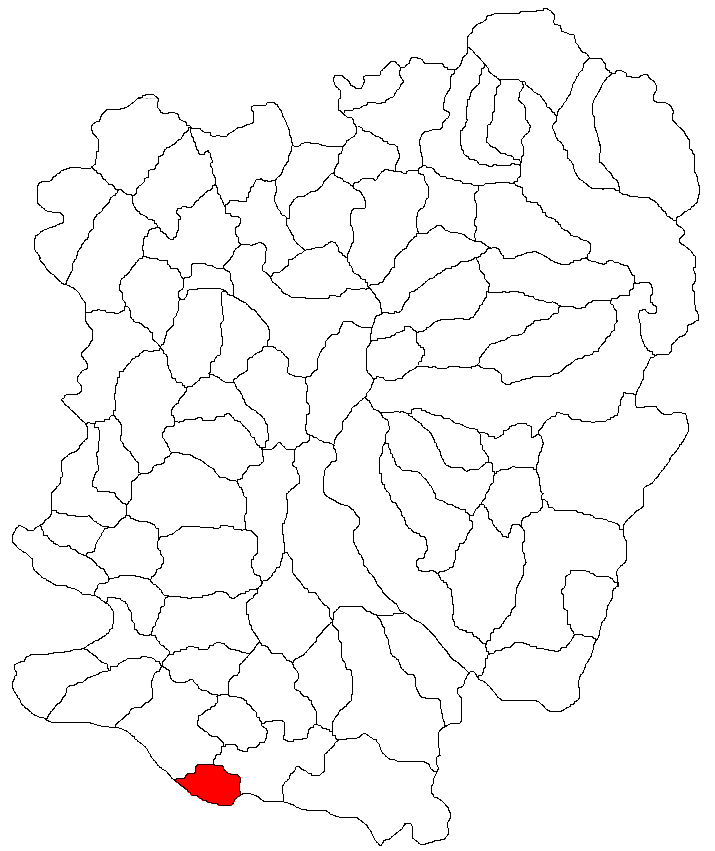
- Location in Caraș-Severin County

- Location in Romania
- Coordinates: 44°44′N 21°41′E
- Country: Romania
- County: Caraș-Severin
- Established: August 1798 (settled); 1858 (incorporated)

Government
  - Mayor (2020–2024): Ilie Boboescu (PSD)
- Area: 25.94 km^{2} (10.02 sq mi)
- Elevation: 100 m (330 ft)
- Population (2021-12-01): 1,514
  - Density: 58.37/km^{2} (151.2/sq mi)
- Time zone: UTC+02:00 (EET)
  - Summer (DST): UTC+03:00 (EEST)
- Postal code: 327160
- Area code: (+40) 02 55
- Vehicle reg.: CS
- Website: primariacoronini.ro

Coronini (Romanian pronunciation: [koroˈnini]; until 1996 Pescari [pesˈkarʲ]; Hungarian: Lászlóvára or Koronini; occasionally referred to as Peskari in German) is a commune in Caraș-Severin County, western Romania, with a population of 1,514 as of 2021. Part of the region of Banat, it includes Coronini and Sfânta Elena villages. Situated on the Danube and the border with Serbia, part of the mountainous area known as Clisura Dunării, Coronini holds several archaeological sites, which trace its history back to the Bronze Age. The locality is home to a medieval fortress built by rulers of the Hungarian Kingdom, but was re-founded during the Banat colonization of the 1790s, and officially in 1858. A center for immigration from the Czech lands in the early 19th century, Sfânta Elena is among the traditional places founded by and associated with the Czech-Romanian community.

Coronini as a whole was transformed by 20th century political changes, industrialization and economic fluctuations: Coronini village became a center for the mining industry, while Sfânta Elena was heavily affected rural-urban migration, and eventually by voluntary resettlement in the Czech Republic. During the 1990s, the commune became ill-famed as a hub for contraband in petroleum products.

== Location ==
The commune is located on the foothills of the Southern Carpathians, where these meet the Danube, and in proximity to the Clisura Dunării and Iron Gates areas. Facing Serbia on the right bank of the Danube, it is also close to a canyon formed by the Alibeg River. The Sfânta Elena area is located on a karstic plateau, which groups sinkholes and limestone pavements, features also present in neighboring areas (Berzasca, the Mudavița Seacă Valley, etc.). The area has also been described as fault plain, part of the Banat Mountains graben (itself known as Coroniniului or Lászlóvára). Coronini is located near a stone formation known as Babacaia (also Babakái or Babocaise), and close to the hills Cralievăț, Cârșia Văradului, and Vuiții. It also houses caves such as Gaura cu muscă, once famous as the breeding ground of Simulium colombaschense, an endemic black fly species. Another such feature is Gaura cu muzică, known for its natural acoustics.

Coronini lends its name to the Coronini-Bedina nature reserve, which covers 3,864.80 hectares (9,550.1 acres). It is also, with Sichevița, the proposed site of a new nature reserve, Fețele Dunării ("Facets of the Danube"), which is supposed to cover some 1,100 ha (2,700 acres).

== Demographics ==
Historical population
Year	Pop.	±%
1880	1,348	—
1910	1,797	+33.3%
1930	1,982	+10.3%
1977	1,923	−3.0%
2002	1,878	−2.3%
2011	1,674	−10.9%
2021	1,514	−9.6%
Source: Census data

At the 2002 census, most of the 1,878 inhabitants were Romanian Orthodox (1,120 people), while 382 were Baptist and 368 Roman Catholic. According to the 2011 census, the commune had 1,674 inhabitants, and was home to 1,381 Romanians and 289 Czechs. At the 2021 census, Coronini had a population of 1,514; of those, 75.76% were Romanians and 14.53% Czechs.

== History ==
=== Coronini village ===
==== Origins ====
The history of Coronini leads back beyond the period when the Banat area was an Imperial Roman domain (see Roman Dacia). It houses several archaeological sites, which focus on cave paintings and dwellings from the Basarabi culture (8th–7th centuries BC), as well as the mines of Vărad (intensively used from the Bronze Age as a source of gold, silver, copper, lead and iron). Among the oldest artifacts found in the village are Hallstatt tools (discovered in 1972) and a bronze vessel with 178 silver coins, predating the Roman expeditions. Coronini was also the site of Halstatt funerals, probably related to those found on Moldova Veche sites. The Roman period itself is attested by a denarius issued under Emperor Alexander Severus, under whose reign a Roman road was begun.

In the 9th century, what is now Coronini may have been included in the lordship of Ajtony. The medieval period, when Banat was part of the Kingdom of Hungary, left several traces on Coronini's landscape. The location houses the 15th century Saint Ladislaus (Hungarian: Szentlászló; historical Hungarian: Zenthlázlówára) fortress, part of the historical sites in the Iron Gates Natural Park area. Archaeological investigation carried out in 1970–1973 found that it was built on top of Dacian fortifications and newer walls erected in the 6th or 7th centuries, and that the Hungarian building was probably erected in the 15th century. The decision to construct Saint Ladislaus is thought to have come directly from King Sigismund, whereas other Banat fortresses from the period were inaugurated by his vassal Pipo of Ozora. The ramparts were first used in 1396 by Sigismund and Stephen Rozgonyi to block the Ottoman advance following defeat at Nicopolis. The loss of Golubac, over the river, probably contributed to the urgency of building Saint Ladislaus, used as a base during the 1428 attacks.

The medieval period also produced new cave paintings and traces of habitation in the caves, some of which are superimposed over their Basarabi culture predecessors. Also then, the village came to house a quarry. A cemetery, attesting a larger Hungarian habitation, was accidentally discovered in central Coronini in 1896. The fortress, which became known as Lászlóvára, was destroyed by the string of Ottoman–Habsburg wars. At various intervals during the campaigns, Ottomans controlled the whole region as Temeşvar Eyalet. Coronini is the presumed site of Saint Michael Monastery, linked to Wallachian Orthodoxy and attested in Ottoman documents during the rule of Murad III (later ransacked). Turks left their mark in place-names: the cliffs of Babacaia were reportedly the site of an honor killing by an agha, and named after the victim; Alibeg River is named after a Şehzade.

The area was eventually secured for the Habsburg domains under the Treaty of Passarowitz (1718), and then transmitted to the Austrian Empire. It became the newest of Banat's ethnic Romanian colonies. Its population of woodcutters and agriculturists had originated in Oltenia, having first settled in the Banat in the 1640s. Newer waves arrived in 1716–1739, when Austria had direct control over Oltenia. Immigrant patriarchs included fugitives from the law, such as Ion Bălean, who had killed an Ottoman tax collector in the 1780s. They had first settled Moldova Nouă, where they were known as bufeni, possibly from bufă ("owl"): their indentured labor, servicing the Military Frontier, sometimes required them to work at night, but spared them from conscription.

==== Reestablishment ====
Bufeni settlements within Caraș-Severin

In 1798, a branch of the bufeni moved to the Alibeg area, having been contracted by the forestry tycoon Ion Margelia (or János Magyarly) of Oravița. In 1832, Alibeg was formally designated a part of the Military Frontier, and its borders were drawn up. In 1858, Johann Baptist Coronini-Cronberg, Governor of Banat, ordered the entire village to relocate on the Danube shore, and, from 1859, it became known as Koronini or Coronini, in his honor. According to oral history, the bufeni resented recolonization, as it striped them of good arable land (which was then assigned to an Austrian officer), and because it was done without proper arrangements. They were also ordered to invest in stone houses, renouncing their cheaper bordeie. During the following decades, the village was modernized, with road paving, river engineering and new works on the fortifications, and the introduction of gas lighting; however, its population was plagued by modern infections—syphilis and tuberculosis were brought in by visitors and foreign workers.

Assigned to the Hungarian component of Austria-Hungary in 1867, by 1900 Coronini was also included in Krassó-Szörény County. That year, it had 901 inhabitants, of whom 872 were ethnic Romanians. Late in World War I, and following the Aster Revolution, the village experienced administrative confusion: in November 1918, two Romanian women, Anușca Băloi and Drăgălina Țundrea, organized the populace and chased out the Hungarian Gendarmes. Koronini subsequently fell into the area of Banat disputed between the Kingdom of Romania, Yugoslavia, and, nominally, the Banat Republic. Claimed during the Romanian union process of 1918–1919, it was instead part of an area of occupation by the Royal Yugoslav Army, extending eastward to Orșova, then included in a buffer zone occupied by the French Danube Army. For a few weeks, the area was included in "Lugoj County", set up and managed by the 11th Colonial Infantry Division.

On August 6, 1919, the last Serbian troops withdrew and Coronini was taken by the Romanian Army—then recognized, under the 1920 Treaty of Trianon, as being part of Greater Romania. In 1922, it was visited by the deposed Hungarian King Charles IV, and, the following year, by the King of Romania, Ferdinand I. By 1924, the Romanian land reform had resulted in a controversial liquidation of the Military Frontier garrison assets, with debates opposing landless peasants to Grenz infantry veterans; most available land was also divided into individual plots, but proved highly unsuitable for cultivation. In 1934, at least 9 inhabitants left as colonists to Caliacra County. Known primarily as Coronini, the village was included in Caraș County and Moldova Nouă plasă. By the time of World War II, it had 969 inhabitants. Modernization continued in the 1930s, when some work was performed on the road connecting Orșova to Socol. It was designed as part of the a thoroughfare linking Bucharest to Belgrade.

During the late stages of World War II, Clisura area saw activity by Yugoslav Partisans and was briefly governed by a council, led by Triša Kojičić. It was subsequently restored to Romania. Re-designated as Pescari in 1968, Coronini came to rely on the copper industry throughout the communist period, a factor which prevented its population from migrating into Timișoara and other towns. It was, with Moldova Nouă, one of two only spots in Clisura Dunării area not to register a significant loss in population. Following the 1989 Revolution and the onset of Romania's transition, Pescari became the center of public attention during the 1990s embargo imposed by the United Nations on the Federal Republic of Yugoslavia (see Yugoslav Wars). Profiting from this situation, it became a main hub for a clandestine Romanian traffic with oil products, which were transported over the border and into present-day Serbia. Allegedly, the Pescari villagers made regular nightly trips with such items, meeting their Serb counterparts on the middle course of the Danube. After the end of the conflict, the population came to rely on subsistence agriculture, ecotourism and fishing for income. The commune, renamed back to Coronini in May 1996, again made the news in 2008, when a German tourist to Coronini captured a giant catfish, weighing in at almost 100 kilograms.

=== Sfânta Elena ===
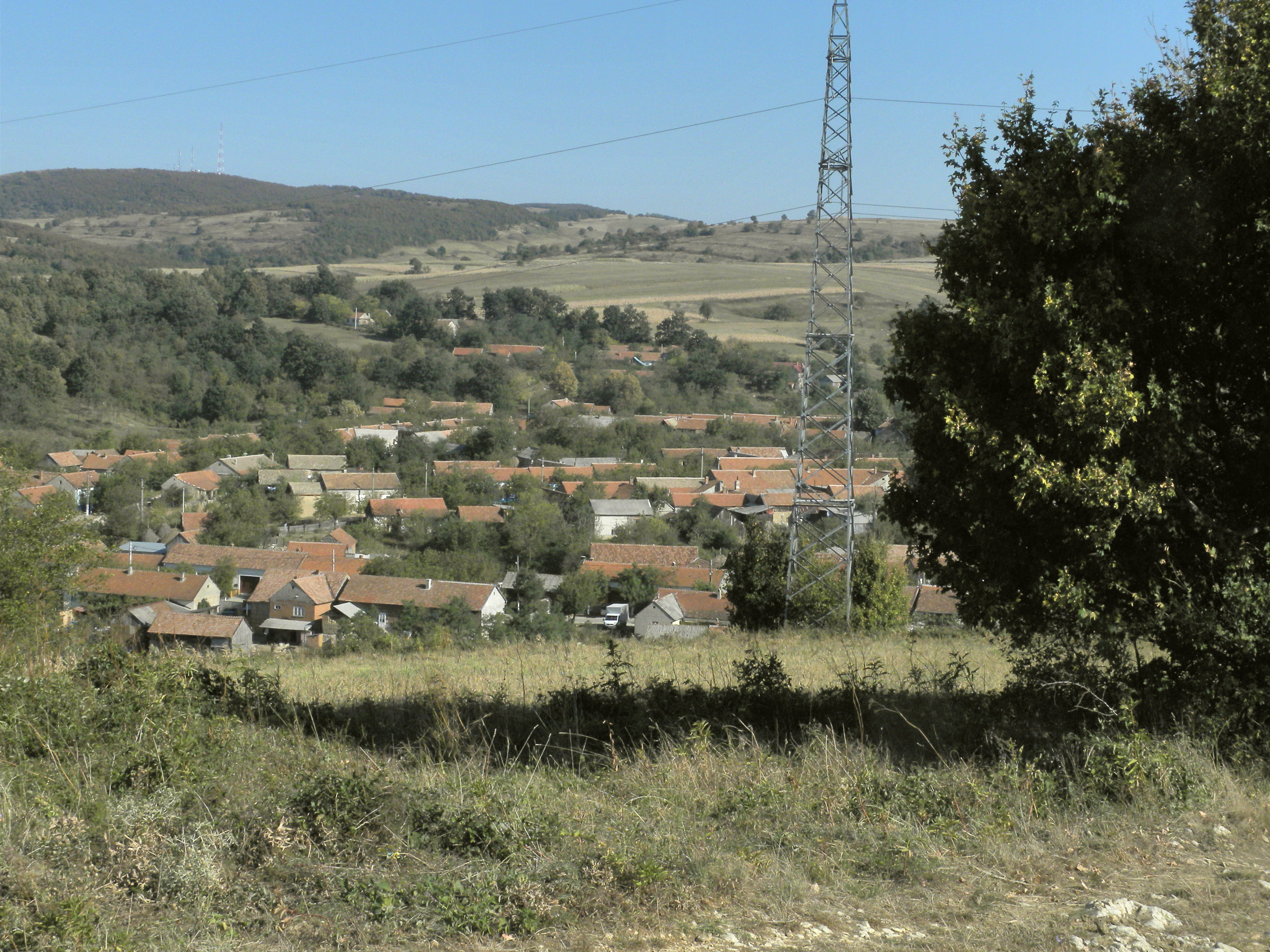
Panorama of Sfânta Elena

The village of Sfânta Elena ("Saint Helen"; Czech: Svatá Helena; Hungarian: Dunaszentilona) was founded by Czech settlers in 1824, during the Imperial Austrian rule over the region (see Czechs of Romania). It is the oldest Czech settlement in the region, and the only such locality in Romania to hold both a Lutheran and a Roman Catholic church side by side. Like the bufeni, the first Czechs (known locally as Poemi) to settle southern Banat were invited there by Margelia. Their decision to leave Bohemia was motivated by the poverty the region faced upon the end of the Napoleonic Wars. First arrivals came from towns in and around the Bohemian Forest (Plzeň, Klatovy, Domažlice), followed later by families from Beroun, Čáslav, Chrudim, Hořovice or Příbram.

The original village they founded was named Svatá Alžběta ("Saint Elisabeth") and located some 2 kilometers away from the present-day locality; founded in 1823, it was disestablished in 1847 for lack of water. Both villages had been named after Margelia's two daughters, marking the Czech community's good relationship with its employer, but, in 1827, the latter abruptly ended the business venture, and left with all the tools used in forestry. Although the village was incorporated in 1832, alongside Alibeg, Margelia's departure left Sfânta Elena's inhabitants faced with a dire situation: some took their families back into the Czech lands, others joined the Grenz. Others still worked on road projects, some as far afield as Serbia. With time, the local Czech group became religiously distinct from other communities: more than half of the population discarded Lutheranism in favor of Baptist denominations (see Baptist Union of Romania). This was allegedly a reaction against the ethnic Hungarian Lutheran clergy, perceived as enforcers of Magyarization policies, with the churchgoers opting instead for a Slovak Baptist preacher.

Known by 1900 as Szent-Helena, and by 1910 as Dunaszentilona, the village was assigned to Krassó-Szörény County. It and the rest of Banat were united with Romania upon the end of World War I, after going through the same stages of Yugoslav and French occupation as Coronini. Between 1830 and 1930, the population had increased from 338 to 916 people. In 1924, a textile factory was set up by a Czech businessman, and it employed most of the female Czech workforce before closing down in 1938. By the time of World War II, Sfânta Elena, still administered separately, was slightly more populated than Coronini, and ranked as the 11th-largest locality in Moldova Nouă plasă.

Agriculture declined under the communist regime, when most men were employed in industrial fields (primarily at the mines opened near Moldova Nouă). After the December Revolution toppled Romanian communism (and the Velvet Revolution emancipated Czechoslovakia), many inhabitants of the village left Romania and settled in what became the Czech Republic—with population numbers dropping back to 350 persons. A new Czech-language school was opened in 1998, but attendance had fallen from 150 to 70 pupils in the space of 6 years. The mines employing Sfânta Elena's population were closed down in 2004, as part of Romania's economic transition. After that date, the village continued to face economical and social problems, including lack of plumbing and sewage facilities.

== Gallery ==
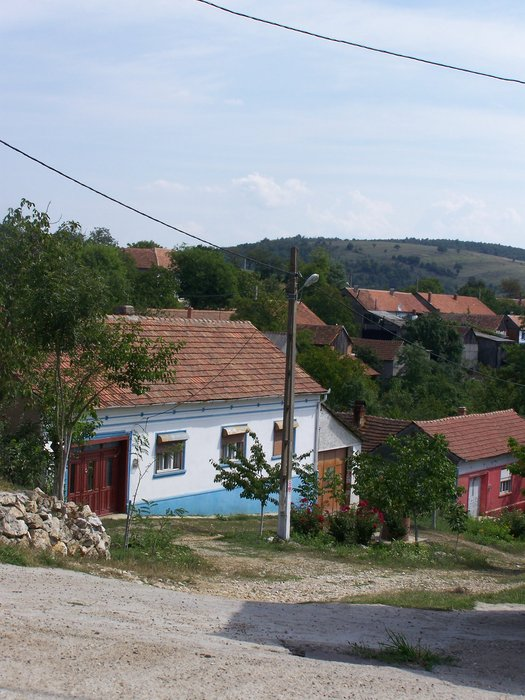
Street in Sfânta Elena

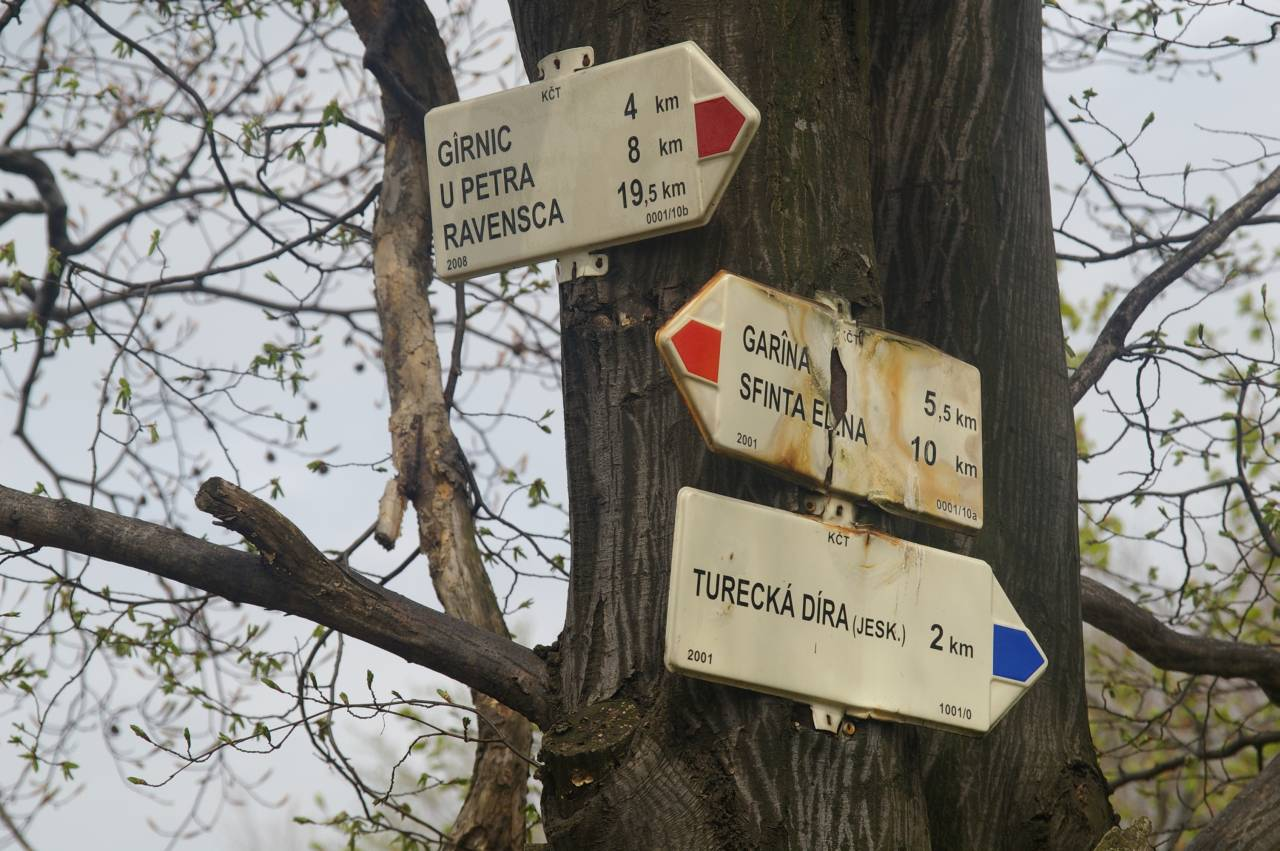
Czech-language signs marking the trails between Sfânta Elena and Gârnic

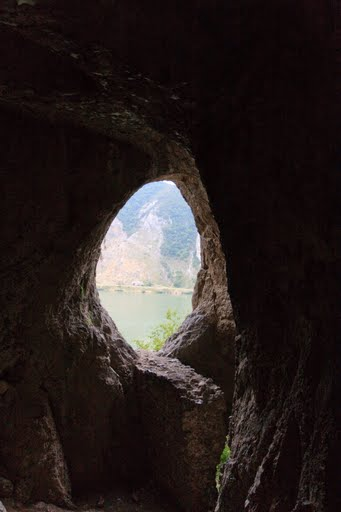
Gaura cu muscă, one of the caves around Coronini

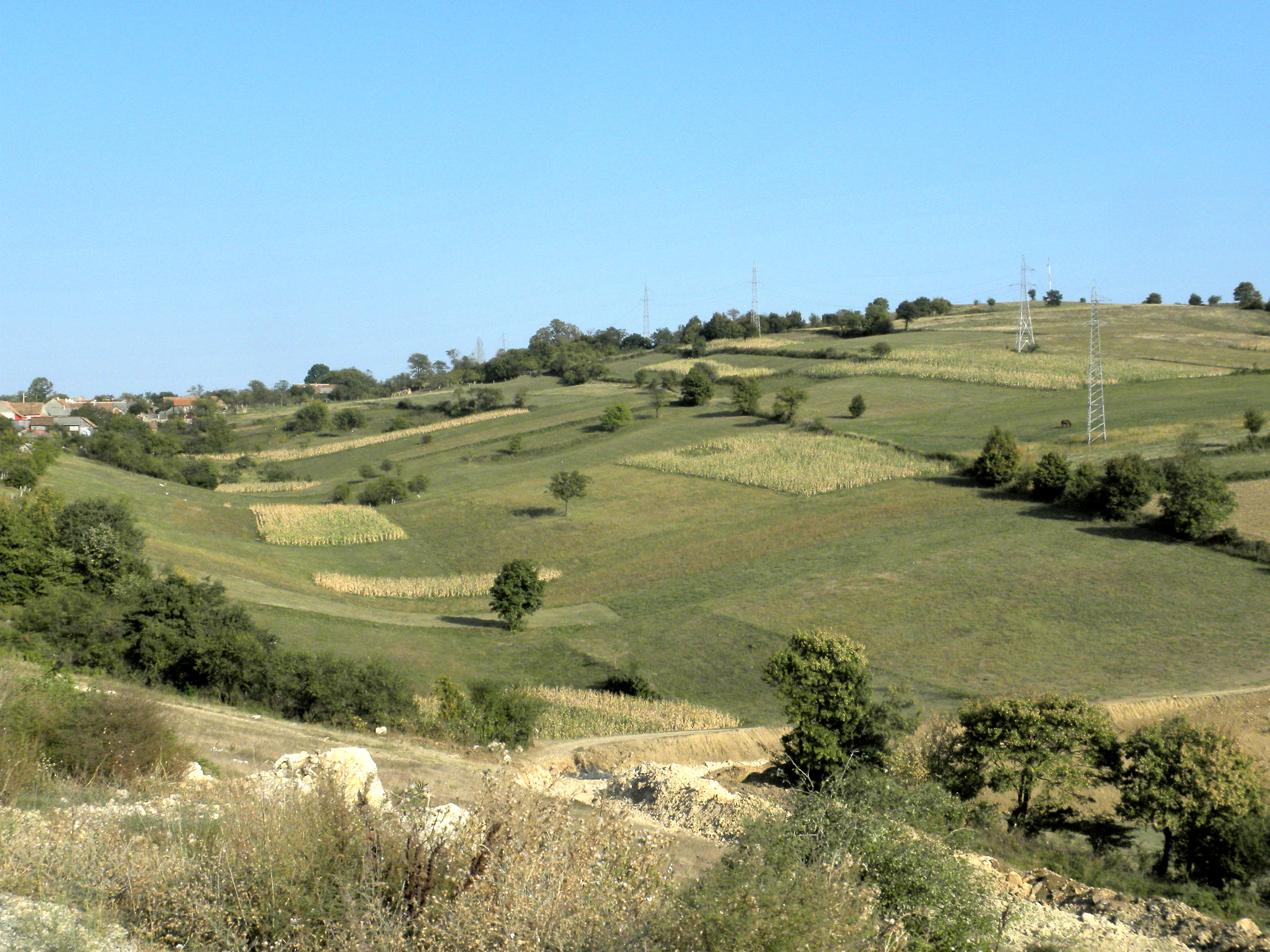
Fields between Sfânta Elena and Gârnic
