= Golubac Fortress =

Fortified town near Golubac, Serbia

- Golubac, Serbia
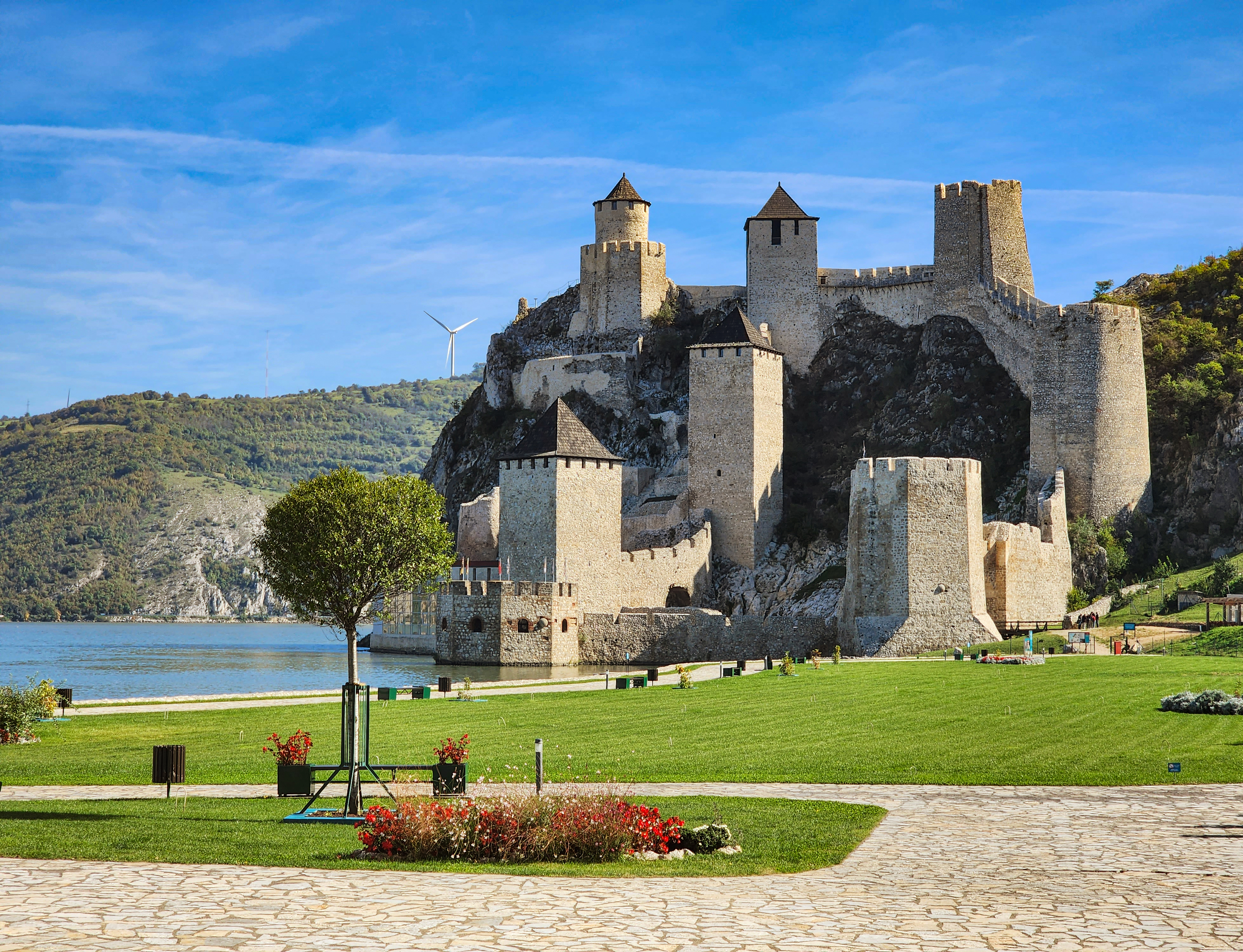
- Golubac Fortress

Site information
- Type: Fortification, mixed
- Open to the public: Yes

Location
- Coordinates: 44°39′40″N 21°40′43″E

Site history
- Built: 14th century
- Materials: Stone

Cultural Heritage of Serbia
- Type: Cultural Monument of Exceptional Importance
- Designated: 1 March 1948
- Reference no.: SK 977

The Golubac Fortress (Serbian: Голубачки град or Golubački grad) was a medieval fortified town on the south side of the Danube River, 4 km (2.5 mi) downstream from the modern-day town of Golubac, Serbia and 2 km (1.2 mi) across the Danube from the village of Coronini, Romania. According to recent discoveries, the fortress, which was built during the 14th century by Medieval Serbian state, is split into three compounds which were built in stages. It has ten towers, most of which started square, and several of which received many-sided reinforcements with the advent of firearms. Towers were not connected for easier defense. Serbian Medieval frescos were recently found inside the fortress.

Golubac Fortress has had a tumultuous history. Prior to its construction it was the site of a Roman settlement. During the Middle Ages, it became the object of many battles, especially between the Ottoman Empire and the Kingdom of Hungary. It changed hands repeatedly, passing between Turks, Bulgarians, Hungarians, Serbs, and Austrians, until 1867, when it was turned over to the Serbian Knez, Mihailo Obrenović III. In the 21st century it is a popular tourist attraction in the region and a sightseeing point on Danube boat tours.

The fortress has a distinction of successfully repelling over 120 attacks.

== Location ==
Golubac, in the Braničevo District of north-eastern Serbia and on the modern-day border with Romania, marks the entrance to the Đerdap national park. It is strategically located on the embankment of the Danube River where it narrows to form the Iron Gate gorge, allowing for the regulation and taxation of traffic across and along the river. In the Middle Ages, this was done with the aid of a strong chain connected to Babakaj, a rock on the far side of the river. At the fortress location, the Danube is 6.5 km (4.0 mi) wide.

== Name ==
The name of the fortress and the modern town in its vicinity can be translated as the "Pigeon city" or the "Dove city" (golub, "pigeon"). It is not uncommon name source in the Serbian toponymy, but the exact reason for the fortress' name is not known and only the myths of the origin of the name exist. Some sources use the descriptive method, as the "towers, like pigeons aim for the skies". The most popular, but obviously also much later myth, is that of a beautiful Serbian girl named Golubana. A local Turkish pasha fell in love with her, but she loved a young Serbian man and rejected all the proposals and expensive gifts from the pasha. Angered, he took her down in a boat and either imprisoned her in the only cone-roofed tower, or tied her to the rock above the river and left her there until she died. Exist others names as Hungarian: Galambóc vára, Bulgarian: Гълъбец, Romanian: Cetatea Golubăț and Turkish: Güvercinlik Kalesi.

== History ==
The remains uncovered during the 2010s reconstruction, points to the Roman and Byzantine settlement which predated the fortress. The evidence was found in the typical brick-stone combination of construction, especially in the building which the Ottomans later used as a hammam. Remains of the waterworks system were also discovered.

=== Medieval era ===
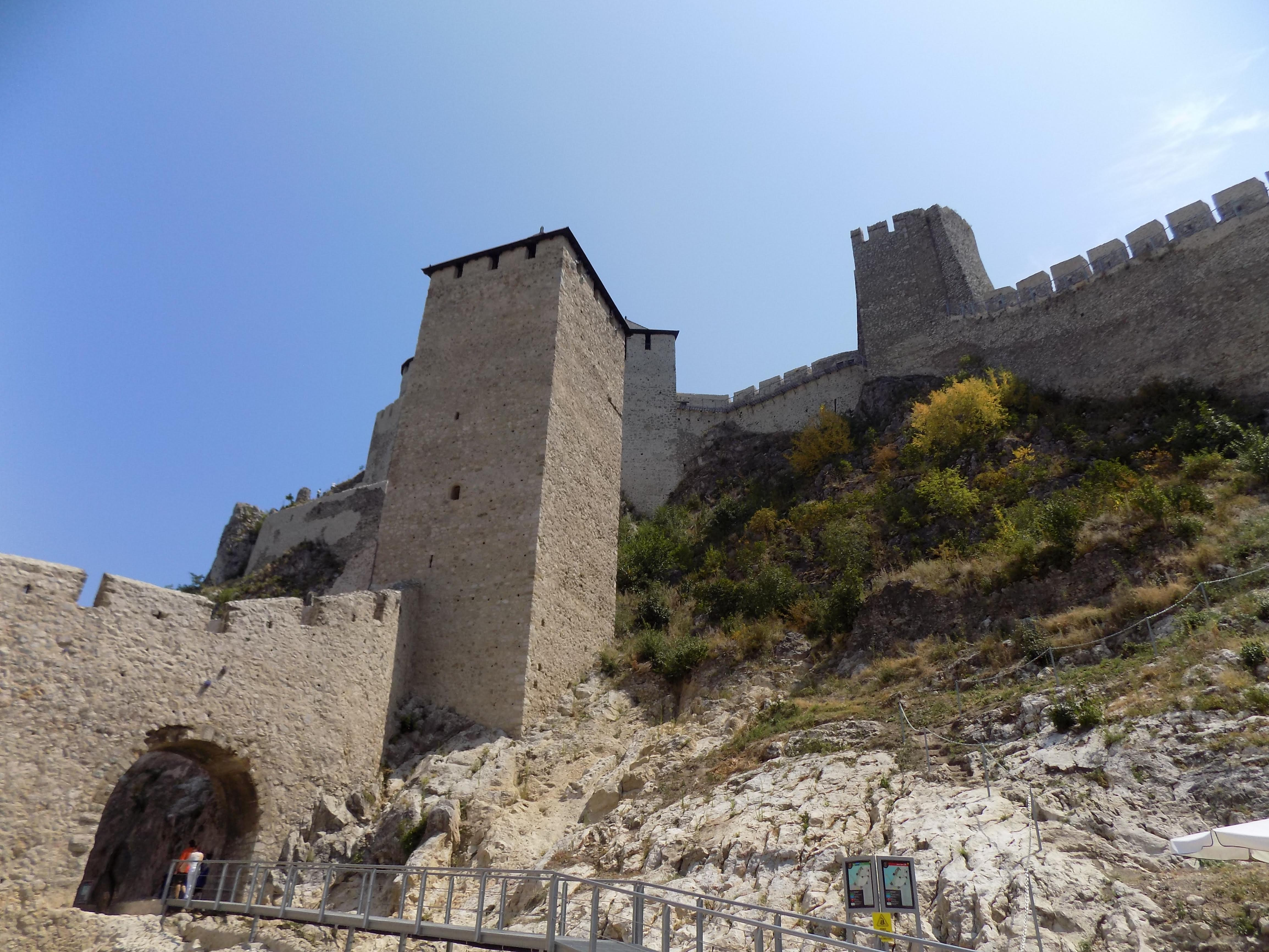
Main entrance and forward compound

Golubac's early history is uncertain. From 803 to 1018, the area belonged to the First Bulgarian Empire, to the Byzantine Empire from then until 1193, and the Second Bulgarian Empire until 1257. The area remained in Serbian hands from then until the Ottoman conquest in the 15th century, with control of the region changing many times between Hungarians, Bulgarians and Serbs before then. It is also unclear whether the medieval fortress was built by Bulgarians, Serbs or Hungarians, or how many towers it had originally. However, an Orthodox chapel built as part of one tower shows that it, at least, was built by a local noble. There is also uncertainty about when construction started, although it is generally agreed that the majority of the fortress was built early in the 14th century. The chapel probably originated from the period of Despot Stefan Lazarević in the first half of the 15th century.

Some of the proposed theories are those that Serbian king Stefan Dragutin built it in 1286 or that Hungarians built it soon after they conquered this part of the Braničevo region from the Serbs a bit after this date. None can be confirmed by the historiography, but the discovery of the aforementioned Orthodox chapel might tentatively point to the Serbian origin of the fortress.

The first known record of Golubac is in Hungarian sources from 1335, when it was occupied by Hungarian military. It was described as the "watcher made of stone, guarding the gorge". Sometime between 1345 and 1355, Serbian Tsar Stefan Dušan toured the Braničevo region, which was part of Serbia along the boundary between Serbia and Hungary. He also visited Golubac, which was under the command of Castellan Toma, Voivode of Transylvania, under Hungarian control. After Dušan's death, the House of Rastislalić gained influence in Braničevo, later winning independence. According to Serbian chroniclers, Knez (title) (Count) Lazar of Serbia evicted the last Rastislalić feudal lord, Radič Branković, in 1379, and then presented outlying villages to monasteries in Wallachia.

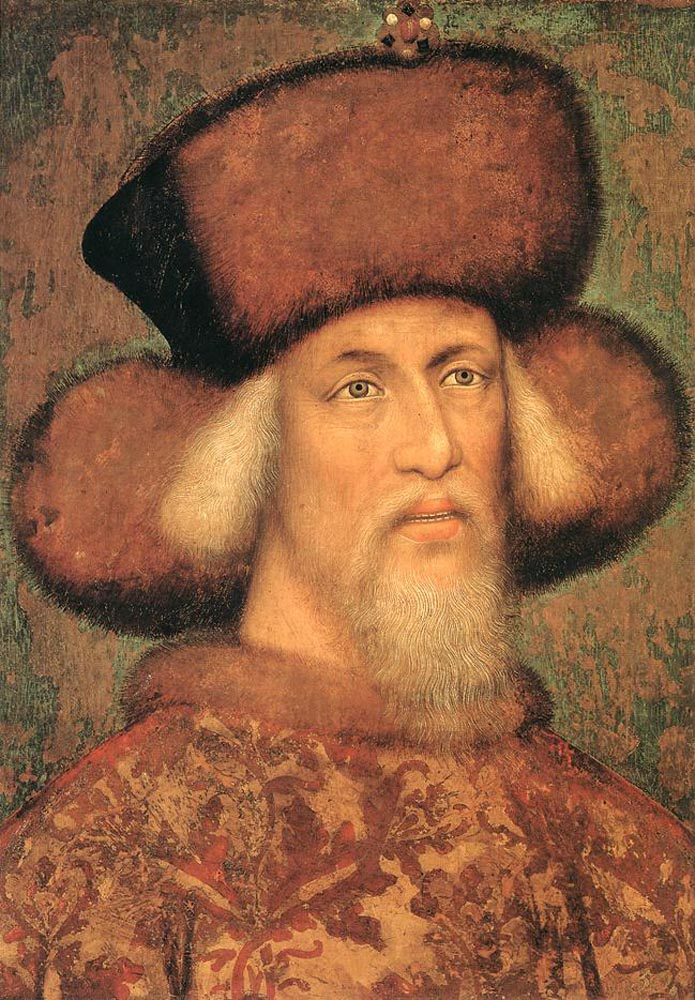
Sigismund, King of Hungary

By the time of the Battle of Kosovo in 1389, Golubac was held by Serbia. It is unclear when or how it changed hands, though one source puts it later than 1382. After the battle, the fortress was lost to Sultan Bayezid I, marking the first possession by the Ottoman Empire. In 1391, Golubac switched hands twice. Hungarian Timișoaran Comes Péter Perényi won it, but shortly afterwards lost it again to the Turks. Later, it returned once again to the Kingdom of Hungary.

The first extended Serbian possession of Golubac began in 1403 when Sigismund, King of Hungary, ceded it as a personal fiefdom to Despot (court title) Stefan Lazarević, jointly with Belgrade, after he became a highest rank member of the Hungarian chivalry Order of the Dragon. In May 1426, Stefan and Sigismund met in Tata to discuss who Stefan's successor would be. A contract was written stating that Sigismund would accept Đurađ Branković, on the condition that Golubac, Belgrade, and Mačva were returned to Hungary when Stefan died. After Stefan's death in 1427, Sigismund hurried to have the clauses of the Tata contract fulfilled, and Belgrade and Mačva were handed over without a problem. However, Golubac's commander, Voivode Jeremija, demanded a compensation of 12,000 ducats. When Sigismund refused to pay, Jeremija handed Golubac to the Turks, who turned it into the pasha's residence.

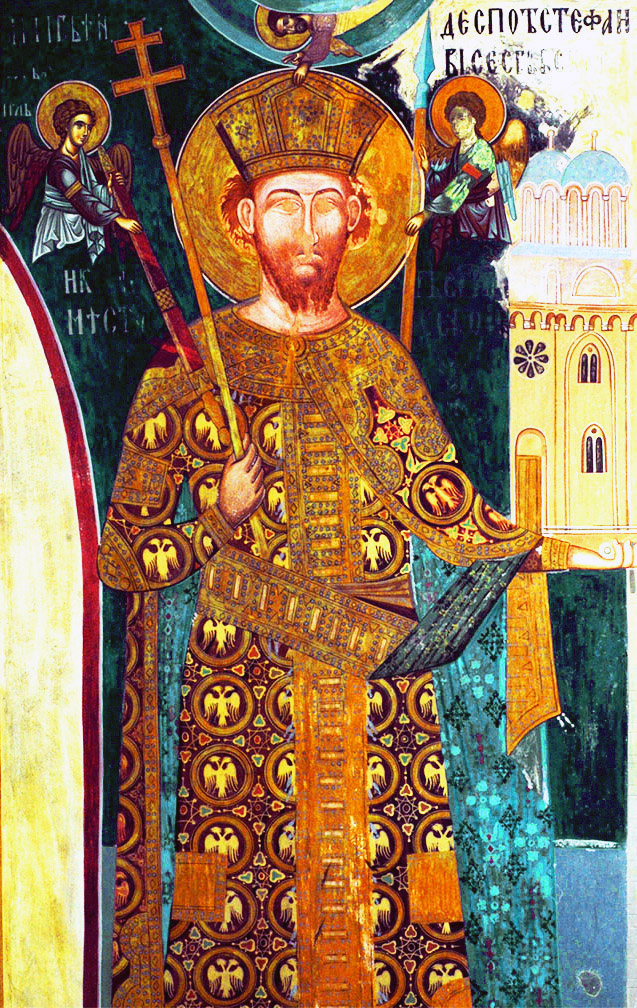
Stefan Lazarević, Despot of Serbia

Despite gaining Golubac, Sultan Murad II was not pleased with the increased Hungarian influence elsewhere in Serbia, so he sent his army to attack. One squad came from Golubac and targeted nearby Serbian and Hungarian settlements in the Braničevo region. In response, Đurađ personally travelled to Golubac, promising forgiveness to Jeremija and urging him to return the fortress by any means possible. The Voivode refused, and attacked the Despot when he and his escort attempted to enter the walls. These events were followed in 1428 by the Battle of Golubac.

Around April 1428, Sigismund amassed an army of 25,000 infantry, 6,000 Wallachian archers led by Prince Dan II, 200 Italian artillery, and a number of Polish cavalry on the far side of the Danube, then attacked Golubac and the Turks. He also had ships attacking from the river, one of which was commanded by Cecília Rozgonyi, the wife of Comes István Rozgonyi of Timișoara. Murad rushed to help the besieged Turks, arriving in late May. Sigismund, who did not wish to fight the bigger army, finalised a treaty by early June. Once part of the Hungarian army had withdrawn to the far side of the river, however, the Turkish commander Sinan Bey attacked their rear, capturing and killing those who remained, among them the Polish knight Zawisza Czarny. Sigismund was nearly caught with the rest of his army; however, Cecília Rozgonyi intervened, and she was solely responsible for his rescue. Sigismund then granted a hereditary right to Golubac to Cecilia and her brothers.

During this and other fights resulting from Stefan's death, southern and eastern Serbia, including the Monastery of Daljša near Golubac, suffered heavily. It was after this fighting, however, that Sigismund was first referred to as "our Emperor", in the memoir of a Daljšan monk, in contrast to the Turkish "pagan emperor".

The Ottoman Empire retained control of Golubac throughout its occupation of the Serbian Despotate. After years of fighting, which resulted in the Hungarian army expelling the Ottomans from Serbia, the Peace of Szeged restored the Despotate late in the summer of 1444. Included in the redefined territory, after much discussion, was Golubac Fortress. However, the Turks once again conquered it after the death of Đurađ Branković in 1456. In 1458, Matthias Corvinus of Hungary regained the fortress, but lost it to Mehmed II that same year.

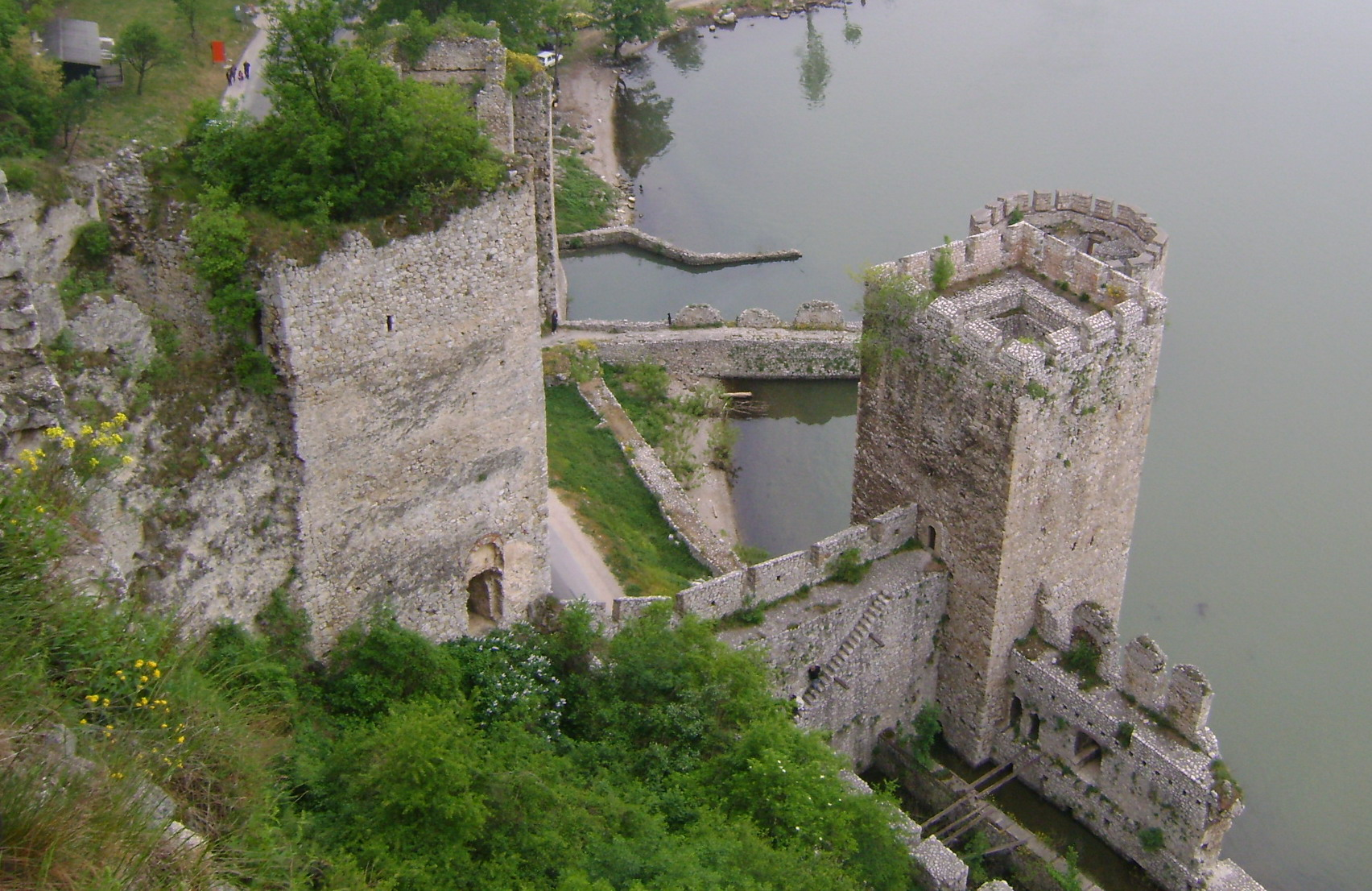
View from the eastern tower

The years 1481–82 led to more fighting between the Hungarians and Turks. During the fall of 1481, while Golubac was held by the Ottoman Empire, Timișoaran Comes Pál Kinizsi undertook an expedition against the Turks in the Temes area. On November 2, 1481, he turned his army of 32,000 men south towards the Danube, pushing to Kruševac. At Golubac, a thousand Turkish cavalry were killed or taken prisoner, 24 ships were sunk, and Mihaloğlu İskender Bey, pasha of Ottoman-held Smederevo and leader of the Turkish army, was beheaded at the gate by Jakšić, one of Kinizsi's men. The Turks were forced to retreat and leave the fortress behind. Kinizsi's foray was only a raid, however, and shortly after he returned to Temes. The Turks, who had suffered heavily but did not lose any land, retook Golubac and quickly improved its fortifications.

=== Modern era ===
Golubac was held by the Habsburg monarchy between 1688 and 1690 and 1718 and 1739. Serb rebels controlled it during Kočina Krajina in 1788–91, and again from 1804 to 1813, during the First Serbian Uprising. Afterwards, it fell back under Ottoman control until 1867 when it, along with Kalemegdan and other towns in Serbia, was given to Knez Mihailo of Serbia.

From the late 19th century into the early mid-20th century, bloodsucking flies sometimes referred to as "Golubac mosquitoes" thrived in the area. They were particularly dangerous to livestock, some years killing off entire herds of cattle. After World War I, a road was constructed that went through both of the fort's portcullises. This road is the shortest link between Serbia and eastern parts of the Balkan peninsula. Between 1964 and 1972, a hydroelectric dam was built in the Iron Gate gorge, significantly elevating the river's water level. As a result, the lower edge of the slope and corresponding parts of the fortress are now flooded.

From the beginning of the 21st century, much of the fort has been overgrown, making most of the sections higher on the hill inaccessible. During the spring of 2005, a public project to restore the fort was started. Most of the plants were removed and certain parts, like the fountain in the moat raised in honour of knight Zawisza Czarny, were repaired. The walls, towers and stone stairs are in good condition, but the wooden floors and steps have rotted out, making most of the upper floors impassable. Golubac has also gained popularity as a tourist attraction. Two key reasons are the major road that passes through it, and its proximity to Lepenski Vir, making the two locales a touristic whole.

== Architecture ==
Golubac consists of three main compounds guarded by 9 towers, 2 portcullises and a palace, all connected by fortress walls 2 to 3 m (6 ft 7 in to 9 ft 10 in) thick. In front of the fortress, the forward wall (I) doubled as the outer wall of the moat, which connected to the Danube and was likely filled with water. A settlement for common people was situated in front of the wall.

As is the case with many fortresses, Golubac's structure was modified over time. For years, there were only five towers. Later, four more were added. The towers were all built as squares, a sign of the fortress' age, showing that battles were still fought with cold steel. Once firearms came into use, the Turks fortified the western towers with cannon ports and polygonal or cylindrical reinforcements up to 2 m (6 ft 7 in) thick. After the Hungarian raid in 1481, they added the final tower, complete with cannon embrasures and galleries.

=== Upper compound ===
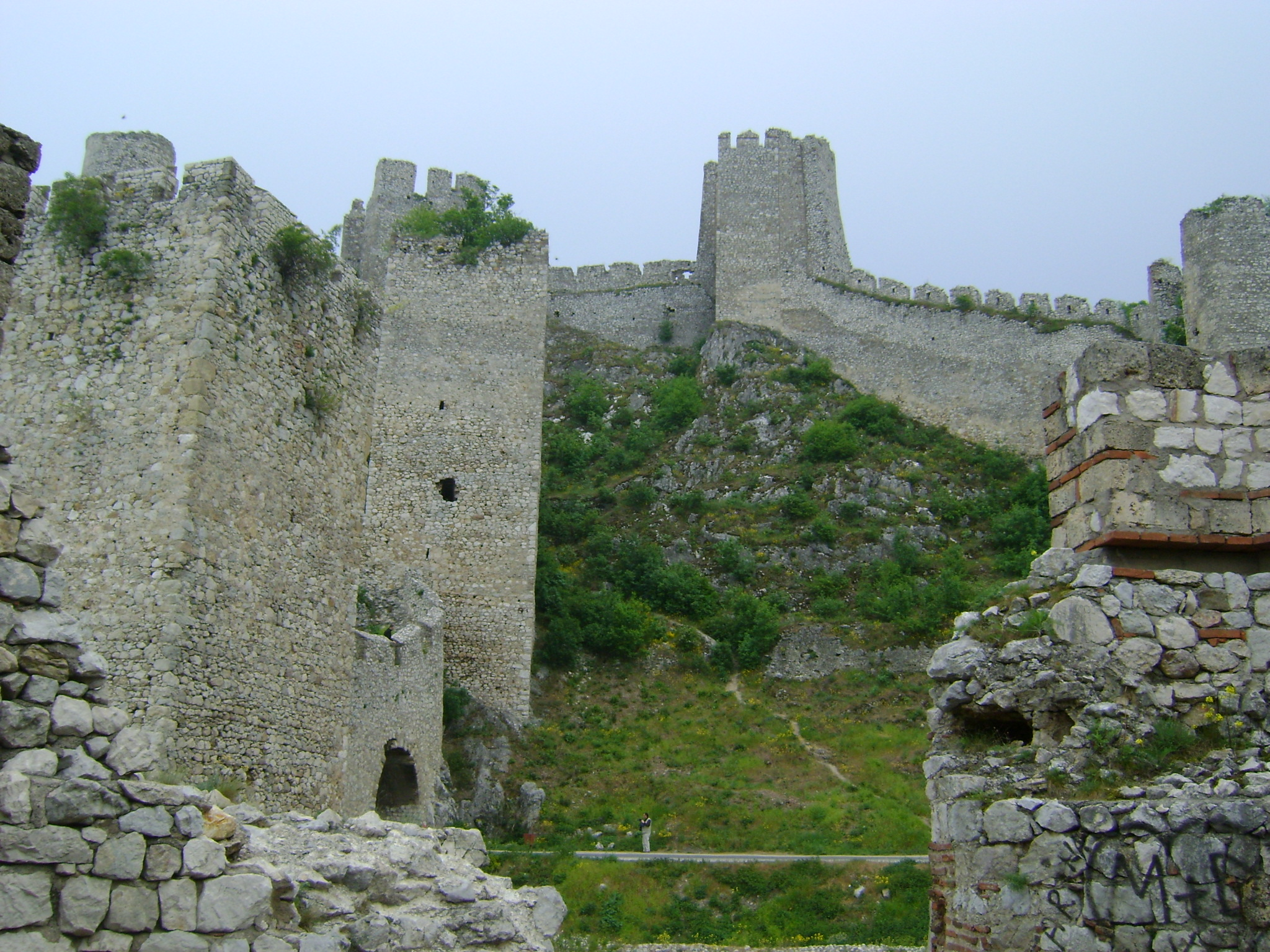
Forward compound

The upper compound (A) is the oldest part of the fortress. It includes the citadel (tower 1) and the Serbian Orthodox chapel (tower 4). Although it remains uncertain, the chapel has led many to believe that this section was built by a Serbian noble.

Later, during either Serbian or Hungarian rule, the fortress was expanded to include the rear and forward compounds.

=== Rear compound ===
The rear compound (D) is separated from the upper compound by both a wall connecting towers 2 and 4, and a steep rock 3 to 4 m (9.8 to 13.1 ft) high. Next to tower 5 is a building (VII) which was probably used as a military barracks and for ammunition storage.

=== Forward compound ===
The forward compound was split into lower (C) and upper (B) parts by a wall linking towers 4 and 7. The entrance (II) is in the lower part, guarded by towers 8 and 9. Tower 8 has, in turn, been fortified with a cannon port. Opposing the entrance was a second portcullis that led to the rear compound. Along the path was a ditch 0.5 m (1 ft 8 in) wide and 0.75 m (2 ft 6 in) deep which then became a steep decline. At the outer end of the lower part, and connected to the 9th tower with a low wall, is tower 10, which the Turks added to act as a lower artillery tower. It controlled passage along the Danube and guarded the entrance to the harbour, which was probably situated between towers 5 and 10. There are remains connected to tower 8 which probably formed a larger whole with it, but the lower part did not otherwise contain buildings.

In the wall that separated the upper and lower parts was a gate that led to the upper part. The upper part did not have buildings, but there remains a pathway to the stairs up to gate IV, which is 2 m (6 ft 7 in) off the ground, right next to tower 3.

=== Towers ===
The first nine towers are 20 to 25 m (66 to 82 ft) high. In all ten towers, the floors and stairs inside were made of wood, while external stairs were made of stone. Half of the towers (1, 2, 4, 5, 10) have all four sides and are completely made of stone, while the other half (3, 6, 7, 8, 9) lack the side facing the interior of the fort.

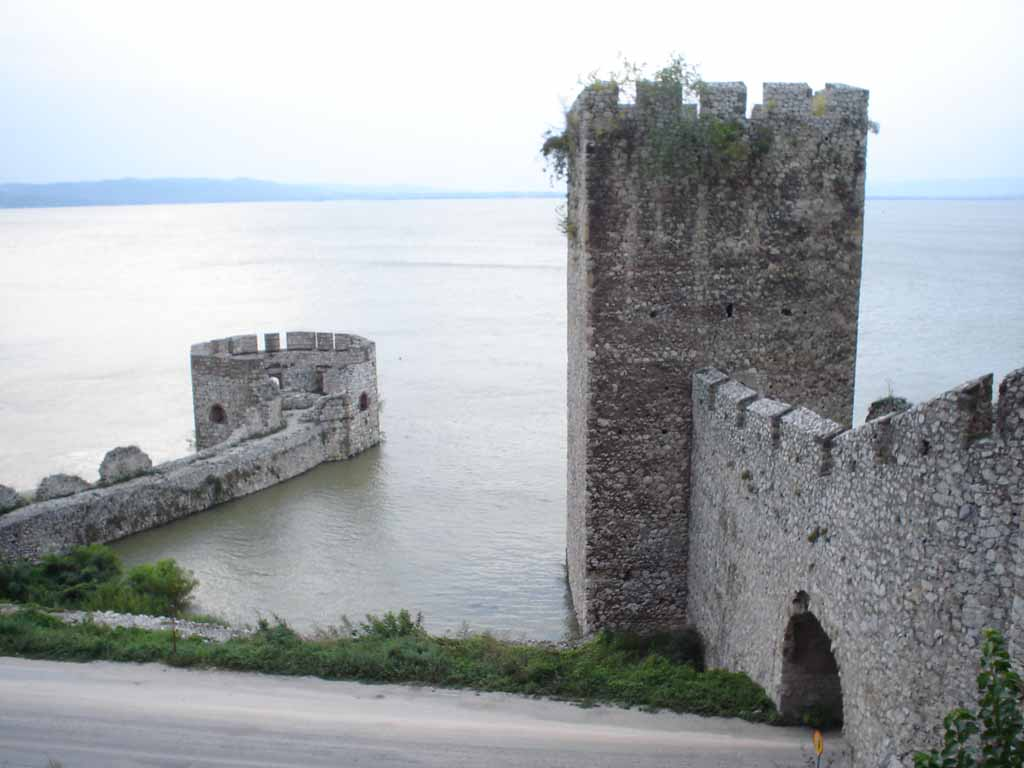
The rear gate and tower 5 on the right, and tower 10 on the left.

Tower 1, nicknamed "Hat Tower" (Šešir-kula) by Austro-Hungarian traveler Felix Kanitz in the 19th century, is one of the oldest towers, and doubles as citadel and the keep tower (donžon). It has an eight-sided base with a circular spire rising from it and a square interior. The next tower to the west, tower 2, is completely circular in shape. The third tower has a square base, with the open side facing the dungeon tower to the north. On the top floor is a terrace that overlooks the Danube and the entrance to the Iron Gate gorge. Down the slope from tower 3 is tower 4, which also has a square base. The ground floor has a Serbian Orthodox chapel that was built into the tower, rather than being added later. The last tower along this wall, tower 5, is the only tower to remain completely square. All towers were originally rectangular, but the Ottomans upgraded them and additionally fortified them against the artillery.

The top tower along the front wall of the forward compound, tower 6, has a square base which was reinforced with a six-sided foundation. Working west, the square base of tower 7 was reinforced with a circular foundation. Tower 8, on the upper side of the front portcullis, has an irregular, but generally square, base. It is also the shortest of the first nine towers. Guarding the other side is tower 9, which has a square base reinforced by an eight-sided foundation.

The last tower is the cannon tower. It has only one floor and is the shortest of all nine towers. It was built with an eight-sided base and cannon ports to help control traffic on the Danube. Tower 10 is almost identical to the three artillery towers added to Smederevo fortress. The cannon tower is also the youngest. It used to be on dry land, but with the formation of the artificial Lake Đerdap in the late 1960s and early 1970s, the water level rose so today it protrudes into the Danube. It is also called the White Tower.

On 21 August 2022, a lightning struck the Hat Tower. Built on the cliffs, its top is the most protruding point of the compound, at 70 m (230 ft) above the river. The roof shingle was damaged, and the electronics in the majority of the complex was fried.

== 2014-2019 reconstruction ==
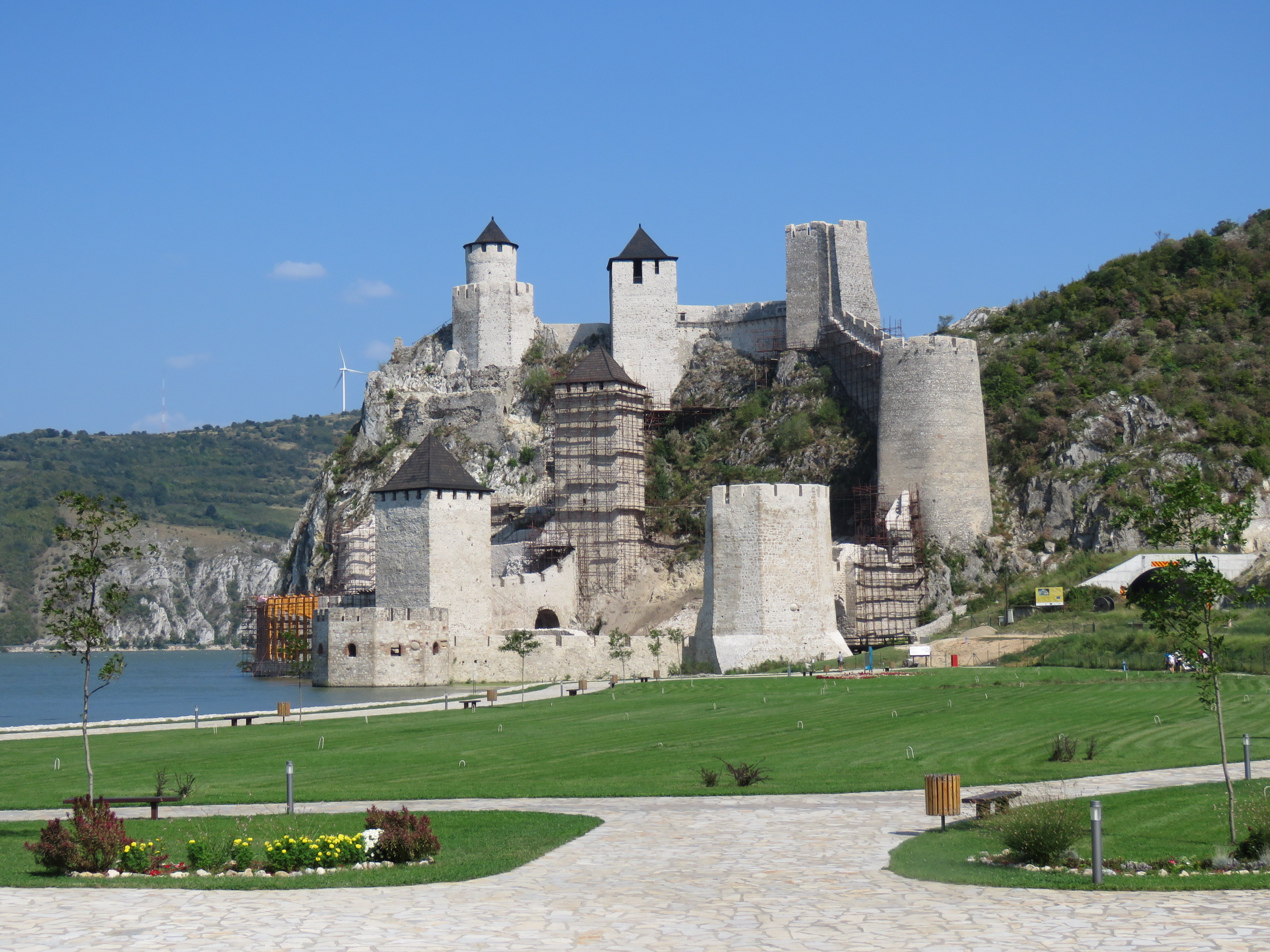
Reconstruction of the fortress in 2018

The area surrounding the fortress was declared a touristic area by the government in 2011, covering 23 ha (57 acres), within the Đerdap national park. The Government of the Republic of Serbia has applied to the reconstruction project fortress Blace with IPA funds of the European Union in the framework of the international project "Cultural Route - Fortresses on the Danube". The funds were provided through these funds in the amount of €6.5 million in 2011 and €2.1 million in 2016. Preliminary reconstruction project is work of architect Marina Jovin, professional consultants on the project were Siniša Temerinski and archaeologist Dr Miomir Korać.

Because of decades of neglect, harsh working conditions, discrepancy between the projected solutions and the existing situation and a fact that heavy traffic was passing right through the fortress, the works dragged on. Projected to last three years, the rebuilding which began in the summer of 2014 is, as of February 2018, still ongoing. In July 2017, a tunnel was open which redirected the traffic, which passed through since the 1930s, out of the fortress and the reconstruction area. The 152 m (499 ft) long tunnel and 700 m (2,300 ft) were constructed for 2 years, using the specifically controlled explosion in order not to damage the fortress.

Traditional materials (stone) and techniques (manual treatment) are used. The deadline is now set at 30 September 2018. The fully reconstructed fortress was open in April 2019, which is when the entire 2014 reconstructed project was finished.

== Significance ==
Considering the age and location of the Golubac Fortress, it is both large and well-preserved. Its placement at the head of the Iron Gate gorge allowed for easy control of river traffic. It was the last military outpost on that stretch of the Danube river, which caused it to frequently be part of the final line of defense between Hungary and the Ottoman Empire, especially during the periods when Serbia was Ottoman-held. The importance of the fortress is further indicated by the attention it received from Sigismund and Murad II, rather than just fighting between locals and commanders of nearby cities. The Golubac Fortress was declared a Monument of Culture of Exceptional Importance in 1979, and it is protected by the Republic of Serbia.

With the Belgrade fortress, it is today the only cultural monument in Serbia which has its own administration - a state company founded specifically for handling the fortress.

== Tourism ==
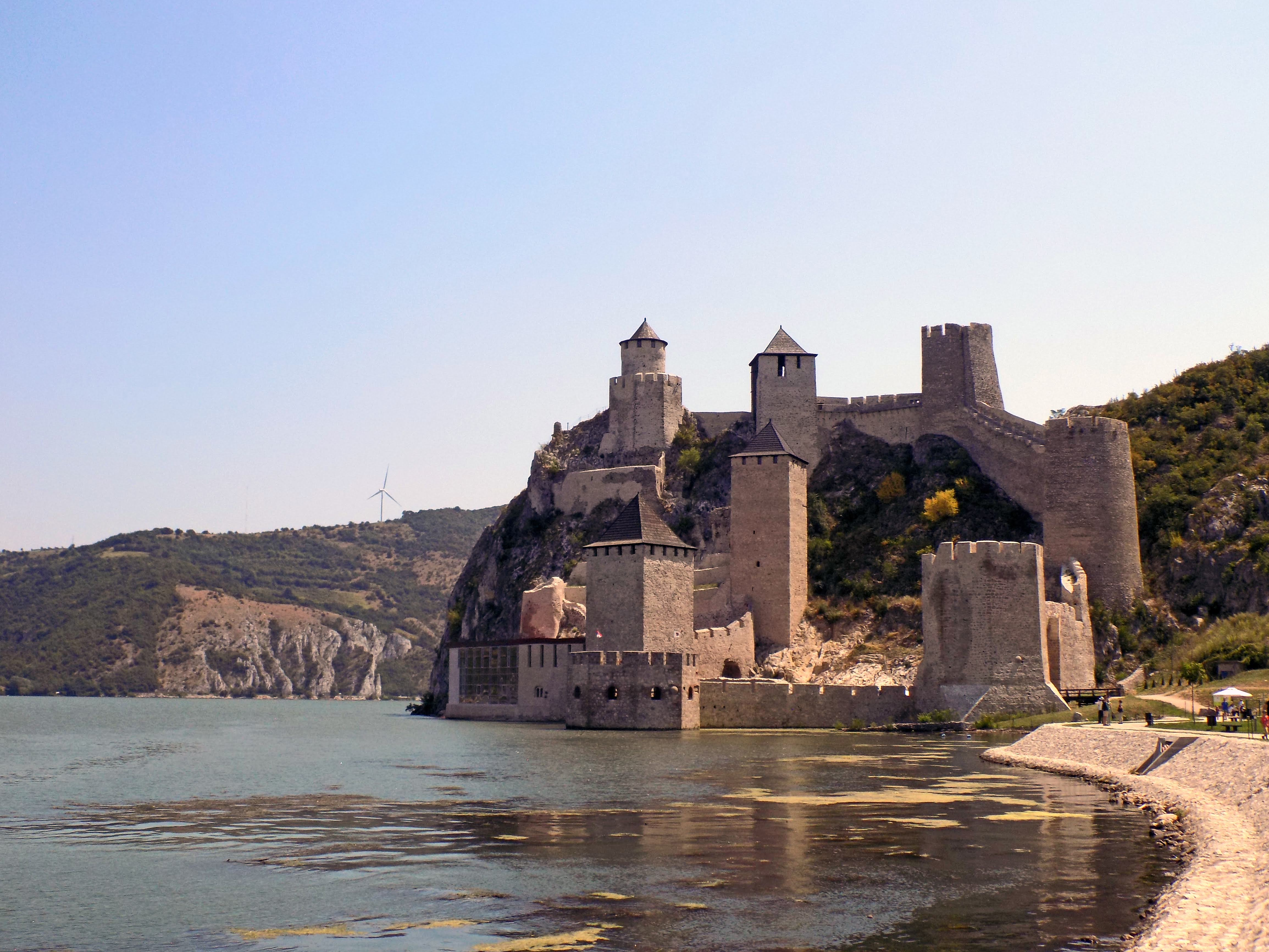
Golubac Fortress after reconstruction, July 2019

The partially renovated fortress was officially open for tourists in the autumn of 2016 and had 63,000 visitors in 2017 despite there being nothing more to see in the fortress than the view and the small exhibition "Panorama through the centuries", so the administration expected no more than 10,000 visitors. Almost one third, 20,000, were foreign tourists. Two piers, one larger and other smaller, are placed in the Danube, but the touristic boats were not allowed to dock until the fortress was officially declared a port area in April 2018, when the international cruise ships began to dock. Also, there are plans for bringing the model cannons into the cannon tower.

In April 2018, four towers were planned to be open for public, 6, 7, 8 and 10, or the cannon tower, but the deadline was extended to the end of the year. The tower 8 will host a three-floor exhibition dedicated to the knights, with a section devoted to the Polish knight Zawisza Czarny. Plans include the joining of the attractions in the vicinity, like Đerdap national park and prehistoric site Lepenski Vir, in one tourist arrangement.

As number of visitors grew significantly since the full re-opening of the fortress, various works are planned in the surrounding area to the west, in the direction of the modern town of Golubac. They include new restaurants, pension-type facilities, new roads, bicycle and pedestrian paths and arrangement of the touristic settlement Dedinski Raj ("Golubac's Dedinje"), between the town and the fortress. Also, the beach will be adapted along the Danube's bank.

Based on the accessibility and difficulty, the complex is divided in four zones: green (the lowest section; open for all visitors), blue (only for adults; towers 3 and 4), red (only for adults with assigned special escort), and black (only for adults with assigned special escort, and applying specific safety procedures - physical fitness, special attire and footwear, absence of acrophobia and ophidiophobia, allowed access for only two visitors at the time; Hat Tower).

Idea of constructing a bridge over the Danube close to the fortress was presented in April 2023, when 15 presidents of Romanian municipalities visited Golubac. The agreement between Serbian and Romanian municipalities was signed in August 2023. The bridge should connect Romanian town of Coronini with Golubac, just downstream from the fortress. The Danube is at its narrowest here, and the bridge will be some 370 m (1,210 ft) long.

== See also ==
- Vršac Castle
- List of fortresses in Serbia
- Monument of Culture of Exceptional Importance
- Tourism in Serbia

== Notes ==
- The information in the Architecture and In recent years sections is from the Serbian page.
- Uncited information in the remaining sections is from either the Serbian page or the German page, and much of it overlapped.
  - The main author of the Serbian page said it is based on Aleksandar Deroko, "Srednjevekovni gradovi u Srbiji, Crnoj Gori i Makedoniji", Belgrade 1950 and Aleksandar Deroko, "Medieval Castles on the Danube", Belgrade 1964.
  - The main author of the German page said it is based on Istorija srpskog naroda (u šest knjiga), druga knjiga; Srpska književna zadruga, drugo izdanje, Beograd 1994 (History of the Serbs (in six books), second book; Serbian authors society, second edition, Belgrade 1994), which is a different edition of the book in citation below.
