= Camenița =

Camenița may refer to:

- Camenița, a village in the commune Sichevița, Caraș-Severin County, Romania
- Petre Cameniță (1889-1962), a Romanian Major-General during World War II
- Camenița, a tributary of the Berzasca in Caraș-Severin County, Romania
- Camenița (Danube), a tributary of the Danube in Caraș-Severin County, Romania
