= Ilova River =

Ilova River may refer to:

- Ilova River (Croatia), in central Croatia, tributary of Lonja
- Ilova River (Bosnia), in central Bosnia, tributary of Vijaka River, which is a left tributary of Ukrina River (near Prnjavor)
- Ilova River (Berzasca), a tributary of the Berzasca in Romania
- Ilova River (Timiș), a tributary of the Timiș in Romania

== See also ==
- Ilova (disambiguation)
