= Rozgonyi =

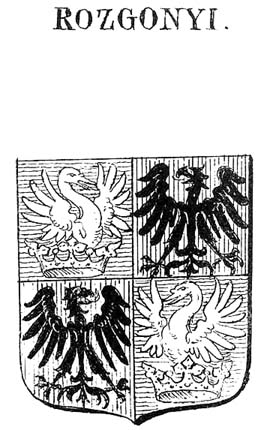
Coat of arms of the Rozgonyi family

The Rozgonyi family is a medieval Hungarian noble family, whose first ancestor Berthold de Básztély was first mentioned at the end of the 12th century. Members of the family intermarried with other important families of the Kingdom of Hungary, but went extinct in the 16th century.

== Notable members ==
- Cecília Rozgonyi (née Szentgyörgyi), the daughter of Péter Szentgyörgyi
- Simon Rozgonyi (? - 1414), a Hungarian nobleman and royal judge
- István Rozgonyi (? - after 1440), son of László, Comes of Timişoara

== Notable bearers of Rozgonyi surname, not connected to the noble family ==
- László Rozgonyi (1894-1948), a Hungarian painter
- David Rozgonyi (born 1976, Libya), an American/Hungarian author and world traveler
- Marcel Rozgonyi (born 1976), a Hungarian-German football player
