= Camenița (Danube) =

- Location within Romania

Location
- Country: Romania
- Counties: Caraș-Severin County
- Villages: Gârnic, Camenița, Sichevița, Gornea

Physical characteristics
- Mouth: Danube
  - location: Gornea
  - coordinates: 44.6605°N 21.8583°E
- Length: 14 km (8.7 mi)
- Basin size: 86 km^{2} (33 sq mi)

Basin features
- Progression: Danube→ Black Sea
- Tributaries
  - left: Ravensca, Sichevița

The Camenița is a small left tributary of the river Danube in Romania. It discharges into the Danube near Gornea. Its length is 14 km (8.7 mi) and its basin size is 86 km^{2} (33 sq mi).
