= Dubova mine =

Chromium mine in Mehedinți County, Romania

- Location within Romania

Location
- Location: Dubova, Mehedinți County, Romania; 44°36′25.42″N 22°11′57.3″E (est)

Production
- Products: Chromium

The Dubova mine is a large chromium mine located in western Romania in Mehedinți County, close to Dubova. Dubova represents one of the largest chromium reserves in Romania having estimated reserves of 2 million tonnes of ore grading between 38% and 52% chromium metal.
