= Siege of Veterani Cave =

1790 battle during the Austro-Turkish War

- Part of Austro-Turkish War (1788–1791)
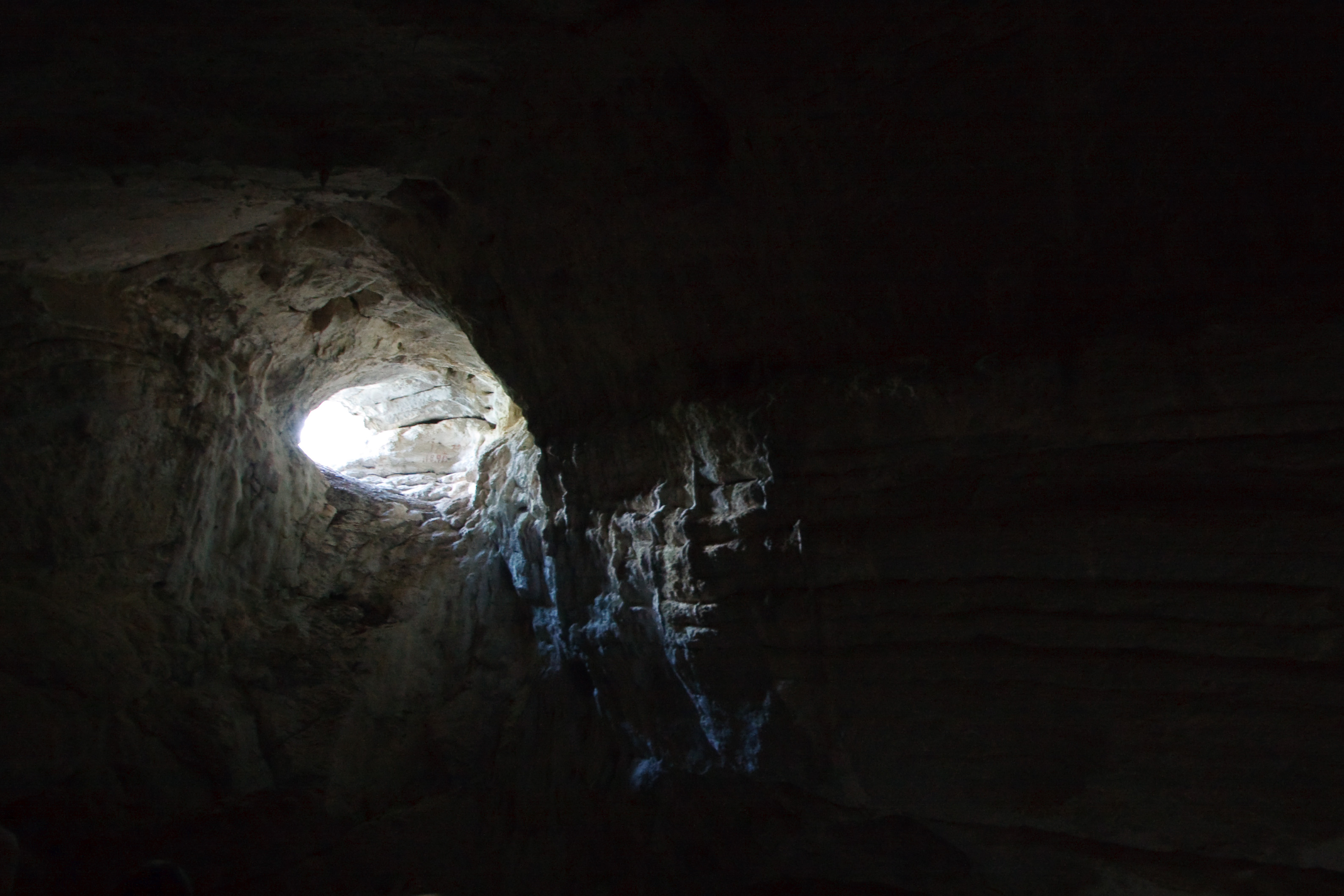
- Veterani Cave, where the Habsburg Army took it as a base
Date	11–31 August 1788
Location	Dubova, Transylvania, Habsburg monarchy
Result	Ottoman victory

Belligerents
Habsburg monarchy	Ottoman Empire

Commanders and leaders
(Habsburg monarchy) Baron von Stein (Habsburg monarchy) Lieutenant Voith	Menish Pasha

Strength
Unknown	8,000 men

Casualties and losses
Heavy	Heavy

The siege of Veterani Cave was a military engagement during the Austro-Turkish War of 1788–1791, which took place in August 1788 during the offensive of the Ottoman army of Yusuf Pasha in Banat. After 20 days of resistance, the Habsburg garrison surrendered to the Ottomans.

== Background ==
The Veterani Cave lies on the left bank of the Danube River, between the villages of Dubova and Plavischewicza. The name of the cave goes back to General Veterani, who commanded the Imperial armies in Transylvania during the Great Turkish War. He discovered and occupied the position, and he established a garrison there.

After Emperor Joseph II declared war on the Porte, the strategically important Veterani Cave was put into a state of defense in order to prevent the Ottoman army from breaking into Banat. A fortification manned with cannons was built on the plateau, and entrenchments with palisades were erected on the slopes towards Dubova. The Brechainville battalion, under the command of Major Baron von Stein, had taken up position in Dubova itself.

The Ottomans invaded Banat on August 7. The Vanguard, consisting of 7,000 men and 1,000 cavalry, led by Menish Pasha into Dubova, had objectives to clear the Danube from the Imperials.

== Siege ==
On August 11, the Ottomans attacked the outer fortifications, and after bloody engagements, the Ottomans routed the Imperials and killed 400 of their troops. Baron had to retreat to the cave and take a position there. The next day, the Ottomans launched an assault but were repelled with artillery fire. The Ottomans began heavily bombarding the cave, which caused the rocks, grenades, and burning wood from the height to fall down.

On August 17, the Ottomans offered a one-day truce, which the Imperials accepted, which gave relief after days of fierce engagements. Meanwhile, they offered the Imperials to surrender in exchange for their lives, which was rejected, leading to another fierce bombardment the next day. From August 28 to 30, the Ottomans launched several assaults, and the Imperials fought with vigorous resistance, during which Lieutenant Voith distinguished himself.

Despite this, the Imperials were in a difficult position, they began running out of ammunition and food supplies, along with exhaustion from fighting, which led to Baron asking to surrender by dropping their weapons in exchange for free passage, to which the Ottomans agreed. On August 31, the Imperials ceded the cave and left unharmed.

== Sources ==
- József Bánlaky: Military history of the Hungarian nation (MEK-OSZK), 0014/1149. The campaign of 1788.
- Matthew Z Mayer, Joseph II and the campaign of 1788 against the Ottoman Turks.
- Heinz Holzmann and Heinrich Salzer, The Veterani Cave at the Iron Gate (Romania). On the 200th anniversary of its defense against the Turks.
