= Czechs in Romania =

Ethnic minority group

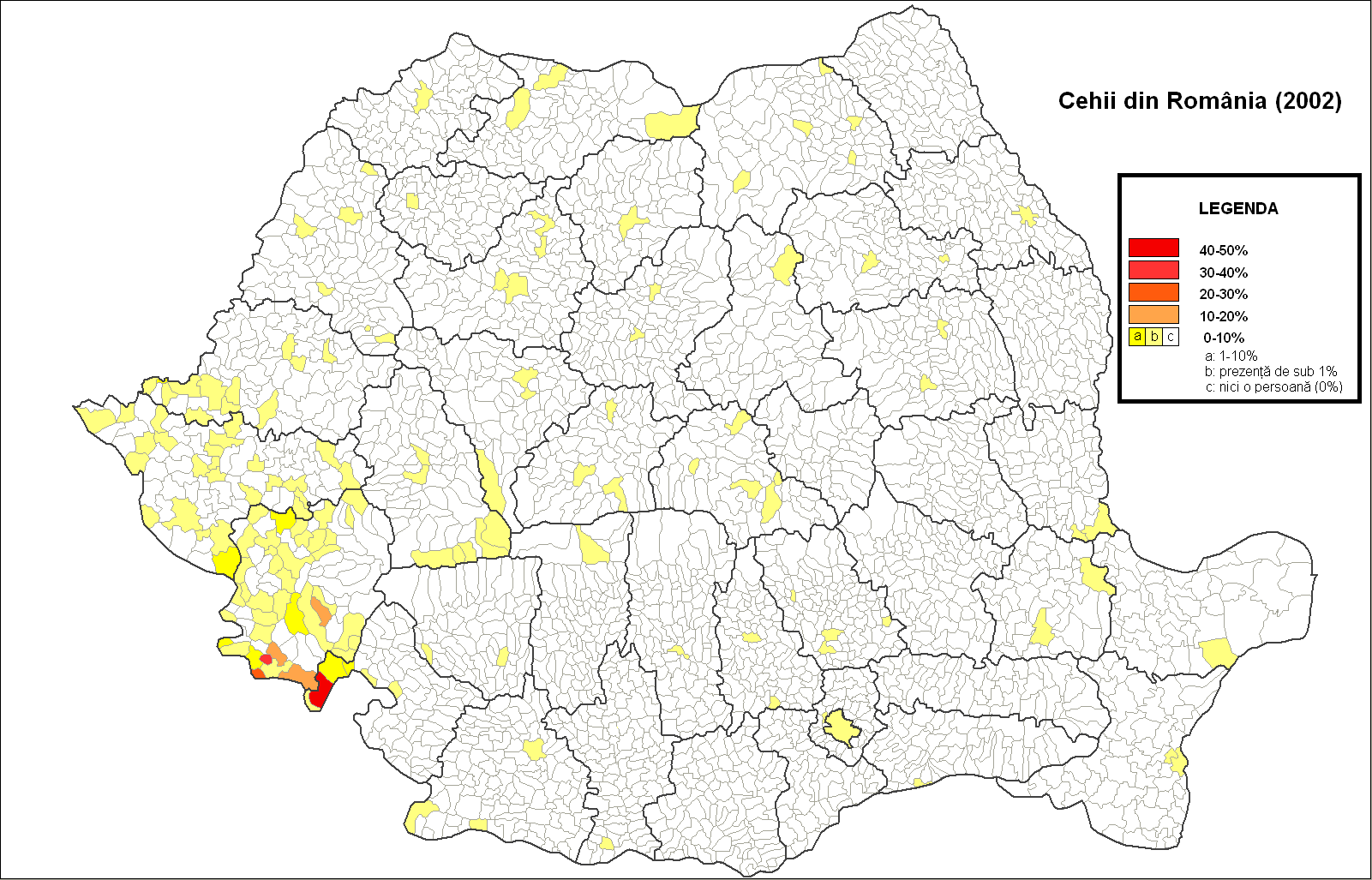
Czechs of Romania (2002 census)

The Czechs (Czech: Češi, Pémové; Romanian: Cehi, Pemi; Hungarian: Bánáti csehek) are an ethnic minority in Romania, numbering 3,938 people according to the 2002 census. The majority of Romanian Czechs live in the south-west of the country, with around 60% of them living in Caraș-Severin County, where they make up 0.7% of the population.

As an officially recognised ethnic minority, Czechs, together with Slovaks, have one seat reserved in the Romanian Chamber of Deputies associated within Democratic Union of Slovaks and Czechs of Romania.

== History ==
The Czechs were among the last peoples colonized by the Habsburg Empire in Banat. Their colonization took place in three main waves/stages: 1823, 1827 and 1862, as a consequence of the need to populate the sparsely populated territories, to clear the forests and to ensure, together with the inhabitants of the Romanian villages, the protection of the borders.

== Communes with the largest Czech population percentage ==
1. Dubová, Mehedinți—40.70%
2. Gerník, Caraș-Severin—33.46%
3. Coronini, Caraș-Severin—27.36%
4. Berzasca, Caraș-Severin—14.24%
5. Șopotu Nou, Caraș-Severin—10.92%
6. Lăpușnicel, Caraș-Severin—10.75%
7. Socol, Caraș-Severin—4.60%
8. Peregu Mare, Arad—3.83%
9. Eșelnița, Mehedinți—2.31%
10. Orșova, Mehedinți—1.85%

There are six villages in Romania with a Czech majority population. Five of these are located in Caraș-Severin County: Bigăr, (Berzasca Commune), Gârnic, (Gârnic Commune), Ravensca, (Șopotu Nou Commune), Sfânta Elena, (Coronini Commune) and Șumița, (Lăpușnicel Commune). The sixth village, Eibenthal, is situated in (Dubova Commune), Mehedinți County.

== Notable Czech-Romanians ==
- Ignat Bednarik, painter
- Anton Chladek, painter
- Matilda Cugler-Poni, poet
- Ludovic Dauș, novelist
- Julius Podlipny, painter
- Jan Tausinger, violinist, conductor and composer
- Anton Vorel, herbalist
- Lascăr Vorel, painter

== See also ==
- Czech Republic–Romania relations
- Romanians in the Czech Republic
- Slovak people in Romania
- Czech diaspora
- Immigration to Romania
