= Antonie Iorgovan =

Romanian jurist, professor, and politician

Antonie Iorgovan (9 August 1948 – 4 October 2007) was a Romanian jurist, professor, and politician. He was the lead author of the 1991 Constitution of Romania, which was subsequently revised in 2003.

Iorgovan was born in Gornea, Caraș-Severin County, Banat, Romanian People's Republic. After attending elementary school in his hometown and two years of high school in Reșița, he enrolled in 1964 in the Military School in Câmpulung, graduating in 1966. His military education was completed at the Nicolae Bălcescu Land Forces Academy in Sibiu, where he spent one year. From 1968 to 1972 he attended Law School at the University of Bucharest, followed by a doctorate in law from the same university in 1979. In 1970, he joined the Romanian Communist Party (PCR). In 1973, he joined the law faculty at the University of Bucharest, advancing in rank to full professor by 1993.

Additionally, Iorgovan was also a member of the Romanian Senate in the period 1990–1992 as an independent and in 2000–2007 as a member of the Social Democratic Party (PSD). Between 1992 and 1996, he was also a judge on the Constitutional Court of Romania.

He died at a clinic in Vienna, Austria of a heart attack caused by terminal pancreatic cancer on 4 October 2007, at the age of 59. He was subsequently buried with military honors at Bellu Cemetery in Bucharest.

== Legislative elections ==
Election	Senate			Position
Election	Votes	%	Seats	Position
1990	35,754	0.26	1 / 119	16th
