= Ilova =

Ilova may refer to:

- Ilova River (Croatia), in central Croatia, tributary of Lonja
- Ilova River (Bosnia), in central Bosnia, tributary of Vijaka River, which is a left tributary of Ukrina River (near Prnjavor)
- Ilova River (Berzasca), a tributary of the Berzasca in Romania
- Ilova River (Timiș), a tributary of the Timiș in Romania
- Gornja Ilova, a village in Bosnia and Herzegovina (near Prnjavor)
- Grabik Ilova, a village in Bosnia and Herzegovina (near Prnjavor)
- Pečeneg Ilova, a village in Bosnia and Herzegovina (near Prnjavor)
- Velika Ilova, a village in Bosnia and Herzegovina (near Prnjavor)
- Ilova, Croatia, a village near Kutina, Croatia
- Ilova, Caraș-Severin, a village in Caraș-Severin County, Romania
