= Sirina (river) =

Sirina Sirinia
- Location within Romania

Location
- Country: Romania
- Counties: Caraș-Severin County

Physical characteristics
- Mouth: Danube
  - location: Cozla
  - coordinates: 44.6205°N 22.0103°E
- Length: 22 km (14 mi)
- Basin size: 74 km^{2} (29 sq mi)

Basin features
- Progression: Danube→ Black Sea

The Sirina is a small left tributary of the river Danube in Romania. It discharges into the Danube near Cozla. Its length is 22 km (14 mi) and its basin size is 74 km^{2} (29 sq mi).
