= Siege of Golubac =

1428 siege

- Part of the Hungarian–Ottoman Wars
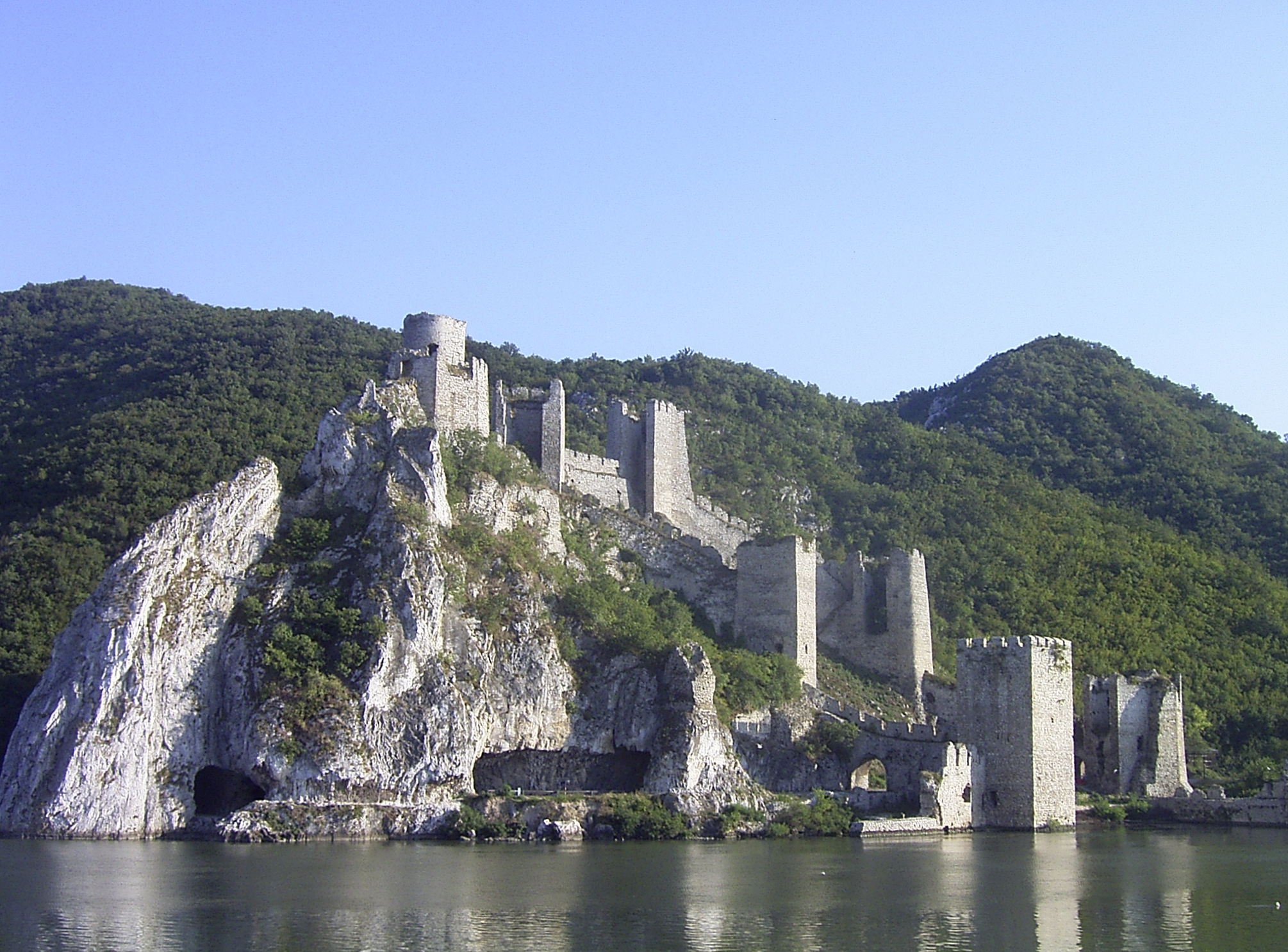
- The Golubac fortress
Date	May 1428
Location	Golubac, Serbian Despotate 44°39′15″N 21°37′42″E
Result	Ottoman victory

Belligerents
Ottoman Empire	Kingdom of Hungary; Principality of Wallachia; Grand Duchy of Lithuania

Commanders and leaders
(Ottoman Empire) Murad II	Sigismund (Wallachia) Dan II; Zawisza Czarny †

Strength
Unknown	15,000–20,000

Casualties and losses
Unknown	Heavy casualties

The siege of Golubac (Hungarian: Galambóc) was a military conflict between the Hungarian–Wallachian–Lithuanian alliance and the Ottoman Empire in May 1428. This siege was the first battle in Hungarian military history in which the Hungarian army used significant artillery. However, they could not capture Golubac and were defeated by the Ottoman main army, led by Sultan Murad II. After the battle, most of Serbia and Bosnia was conquered by the Ottoman Army.

== Background ==
At the end of the 14th century, the Ottoman Empire conquered most of the Balkans and arrived to the southern borders of the Kingdom of Hungary. After the Battle of Kosovo (1389), Serbia was threatened by the Ottomans. Therefore, in 1426 Stefan Lazarević, the Serbian despot, made an agreement with the Hungarian King, Sigismund of Luxemburg: the fortresses of Belgrade and Golubac were assigned to Hungary in exchange for Sigismund's protection of Serbia and his recognition of Đurađ Branković as the successor of Despot Stefan.

After the death of Lazarević in 1427, Sigismund asked Branković to honor the agreement, but the Serbian despot was reluctant. Therefore, Sigismund had to take the fortress of Belgrade with military force. After this event the Serbian constable of Golubac ceded the fortress to the Ottomans on behalf of Sigismund.

== Siege ==
Because of its strategic location, Sigismund did not want to leave Golubac to the Ottomans. During the winter of 1427, he built the fortress of Lászlóvára (today in Romania) across the Danube from Golubac. This fortress became the starting point of the campaign against the Ottomans. When the attack started, Sigismund had around 15,000–20,000 soldiers. Sigismund's army also included Lithuanian and Wallachian auxiliary regiments, commanded by Zawisza Czarny and Dan II of Wallachia.

At the end of April, the Christian troops attacked Golubac. For the first time in Hungarian military history, the Hungarian army used artillery in a military conflict. The soldiers shelled the fortress from warships and from Lászlóvára. The Ottoman defenders of Golubac resisted well, but the shelling destroyed the walls. Sigismund planned an assault against the walls when a significant Ottoman army, led by Murad II, arrived to save the fortress. Sigismund did not engage the Sultan in an open battle and instead reached an armistice: the Christians would stop their attacks and retreat in peace.

The Christian army started crossing the Danube in retreat when the Ottomans broke the armistice and organized a surprise attack. During the battle Sigismund's guards were led by Stephen Rozgonyi, Ispán of Temes County, whose wife, Cicelle Rozgonyi, organized the crossing of the Danube. Lithuanian soldiers, including their commander, were killed while covering the crossing of Hungarian and Wallachian troops.

== Aftermath ==
After the Hungarian defeat, Murad II organized an offensive against Serbia, whose despot, Branković, finally accepted being the vassal of the Ottoman Empire. After the Serbian defeat, the Ottomans invaded Bosnia and defeated Tvrtko II of Bosnia, conquering some of the most important fortresses.

Immediately after the battle Sigismund started organizing a defense system against the Ottomans. He sent a significant army to Belgrade and handed defense of the Banate of Szörény to the Teutonic Knights. However, Murad II did not attack Hungary and instead concentrated on the siege of Thessalonica. In 1430 they reached an armistice, which held until 1432.

== Sources ==
- Szilágyi, Sándor: A Magyar Nemzet Története
- Hungarian Catholic Enciclopedy
