= Boșneag =

- Location within Romania

Location
- Country: Romania
- Counties: Caraș-Severin County
- Towns: Moldova Nouă

Physical characteristics
- Mouth: Danube
  - location: Moldova Veche
  - coordinates: 44.7134°N 21.6367°E
- Length: 12 km (7.5 mi)
- Basin size: 60 km^{2} (23 sq mi)

Basin features
- Progression: Danube→ Black Sea
- Tributaries
  - left: Valea Mare (Baron)

The Boșneag is a left tributary of the Danube in Romania. It flows into the Danube in Moldova Veche. Its length is 12 km (7.5 mi) and its basin size is 60 km^{2} (23 sq mi).
