= Berzasca =

- Commune
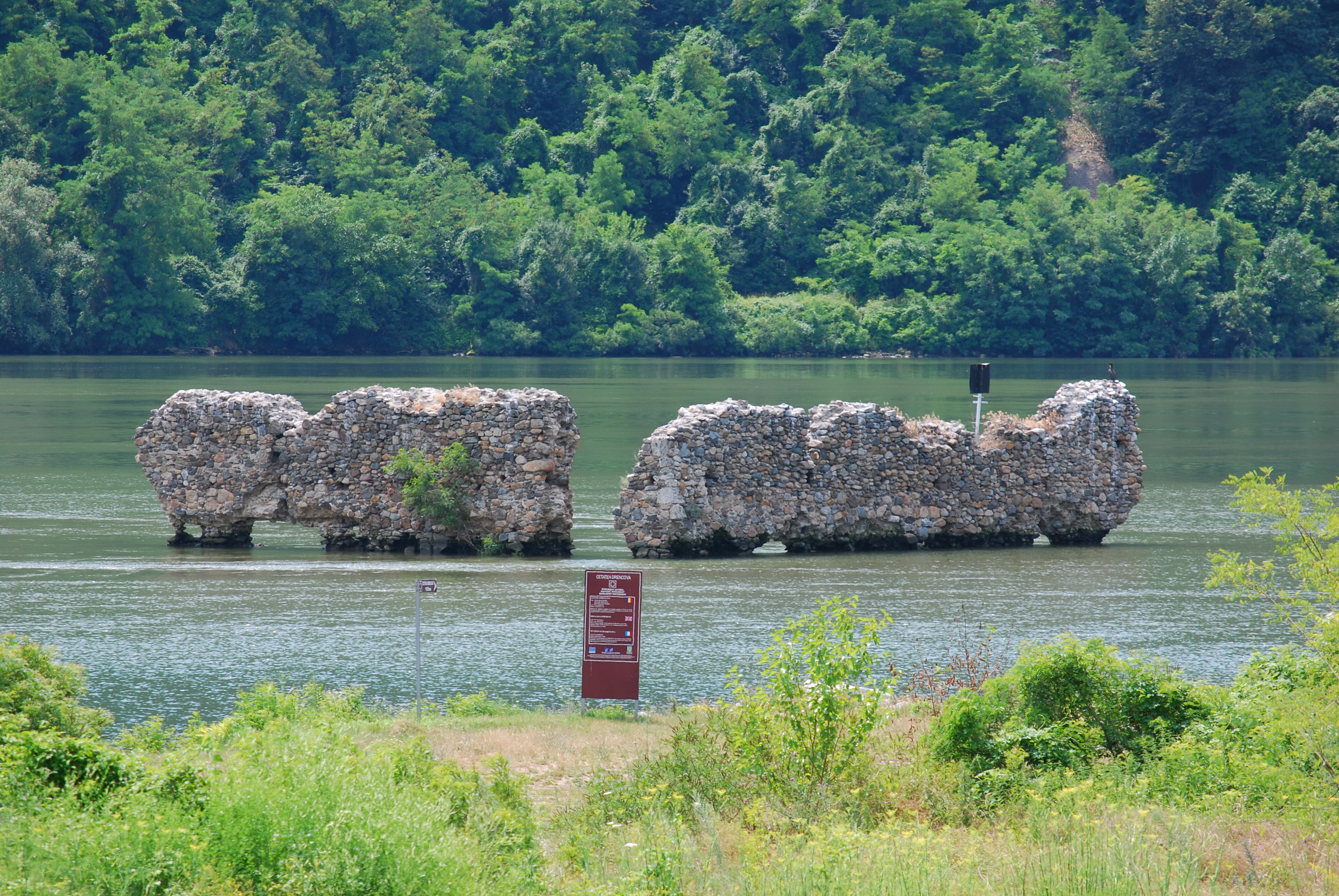
- Drencova ruins

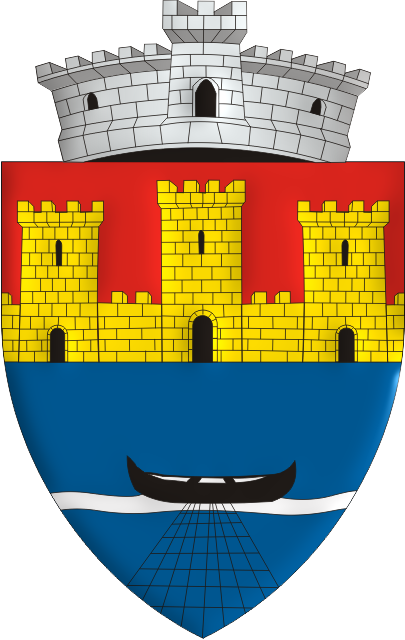
- Coat of arms

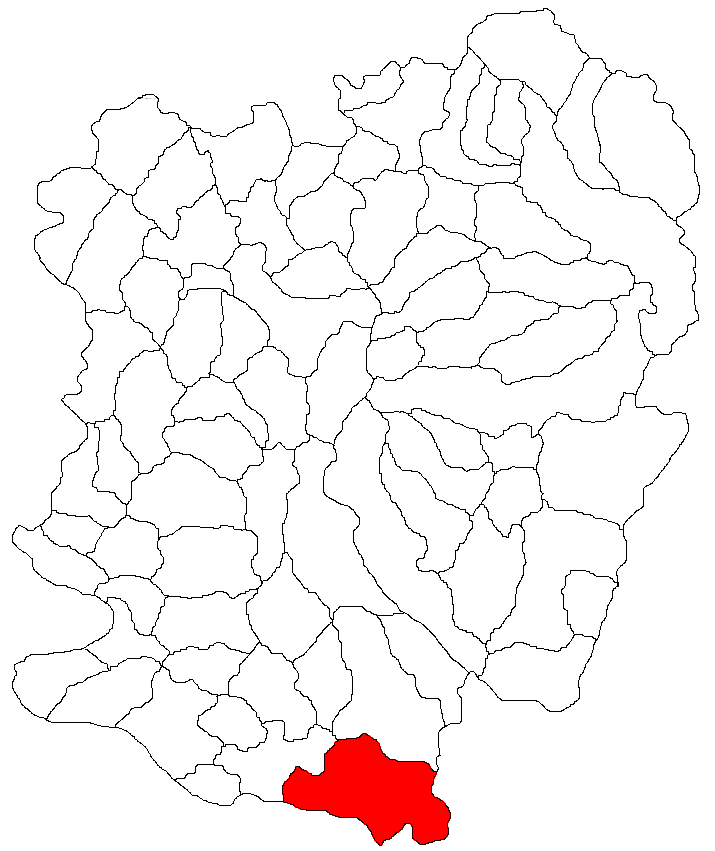
- Location in Caraș-Severin County

- Location in Romania
- Coordinates: 44°42′N 21°57′E
- Country: Romania
- County: Caraș-Severin

Government
  - Mayor (2024–2028): Petru Nicolae Furdui (PSD)
- Area: 280.63 km^{2} (108.35 sq mi)
- Elevation: 73 m (240 ft)
- Population (2021-12-01): 2,132
  - Density: 7.597/km^{2} (19.68/sq mi)
- Time zone: UTC+02:00 (EET)
  - Summer (DST): UTC+03:00 (EEST)
- Postal code: 327025
- Area code: +(40) 02 55
- Vehicle reg.: CS
- Website: primariaberzasca.ro

Berzasca (Hungarian: Berszászka, German: Bersaska, Serbian: Берзаска Berzaska) is a commune in Caraș-Severin County, in the Banat region of western Romania. It is composed of five villages: Berzasca, Bigăr, Cozla, Drencova, and Liubcova.

== Demographics ==
Historical population
Year	Pop.	±%
1880	2,944	—
1910	4,405	+49.6%
1930	4,084	−7.3%
1977	4,243	+3.9%
2002	3,123	−26.4%
2011	2,848	−8.8%
2021	2,132	−25.1%
Source: Census data

At the 2002 census, the commune had 3,123 inhabitants, of which 70.5% were Romanians, 14.2% Czechs, 10.8% Serbs, and 3.5% Roma; 82.8% were Romanian Orthodox and 15.6% Roman Catholic. At the 2021 census, Berzasca had a population of 2,132; of those, 61.12% were Romanians, 18.25% Serbs, 8.72% Czechs, and 3.28% Roma.

== Villages ==
In Romanian	In Hungarian	In German	In Czech	In Serbian
Berzasca	Berszászka	Bersaska	Berzáska	Берзаска
Bigăr	Bigér	Schnellersruhe	Bígr; Bygr	Бигар
Cozla	Kozlatelep		Kozla	Козла
Drencova	Drenkova			Дренкова
Liubcova	Alsólupkó		Libková; Lubková	Љупкова

=== Bigăr ===
Bigăr is a remote Czech-inhabited village established around 1826 in the Southern Carpathians, in the middle of the Iron Gates Natural Park and of the Almăj Mountains. It is one of six Czech villages in the area. The village name should not be mistaken with the Bigăr spring, occurring north of the Almăjului Mountains.

The village occurs north of the Sirina River, a tributary of the Danube, this valley representing a Site of Special Scientific Interest (SSSI) for botanical reasons. The Sirina River crosses the southern flank of the Almăj Mountains, a massif belonging to the South Carpathians.

The villagers of Bigăr earn their living through farming and logging, while up to the early 1990s their main occupation was mining for the Jurassic coal which occurs abundantly in the Almăjului Mountains. The natives of Bigăr represent a special community in which the Czech language is permanently used, including a dominant background of the old Czech language. Today, the village includes mainly older people, while the youth work in the Czech Republic, most of them without immigrating, only to return home for summer holidays or for Christmas. The popular clothes, rural architecture, traditions and language are all well-preserved.

Bigăr occurs in the upper-middle part of the Sirinia sedimentary basin, also known as the Svinița–Svinecea Mare sedimentary zone, a basin including Palaeozoic, Mesozoic, and Tertiary deposits, in the Danubian Units. The Lower Jurassic continental formation includes well developed bituminous coal seams, extracted until 1995 at Bigär (Palașca) mines, Buschmann, Stanca, Pietrele Albe, Camenița, Cozla and many other former sites, together with a rich fossil flora.

=== Liubcova ===
Liubcova village was first attested in 1689 and bears a Slavic name. It was settled following the Ottoman defeat in the Great Turkish War, with Romanians brought in from a sheltered zone as well as Serbs. A 1789 document refers to Gornia Liupcova ("Upper Liubcova", today's Gornea) and Dolnia Liupcova ("Lower Liubcova", present-day Liubcova).

Following the Turkish attacks of 1738, part of the Austro-Turkish War of 1737–1739, when Moldova Veche was completely destroyed, Liubcova suffered the same fate. In 1788, during the Austro-Turkish War of 1787–1791, after the Turks crossed the Danube, they stationed three companies of soldiers on the territory of both villages. Archaeological excavations in the area have unearthed a Roman fortress of 60 m^{2}. One can see Liborajdea and Drencova from the fortress, and the Austrian and Turkish border posts were built on almost the same locations as their Roman predecessors.

Liubcova's Romanian inhabitants are descended from people who lived in a former village on Veliki Breg (Serbian for "Great Hill"), which lies above today's village, 2 km to the east. During the Middle Ages, these individuals maintained the citadels at Dranco (today's Drencova) and Cozla, taking refuge together with the villagers of Sichevița and Gornea during raids. Today, the Romanians of all three villages, in spite of those from Liubcova having lived alongside Serbs for over two centuries, have the same rituals surrounding death, birth and marriage. At the 2002 census, the village had 1258 inhabitants. Romanians formed the majority; 26% were Serbs, 8.6% were Roma and 4.4% Czechs.

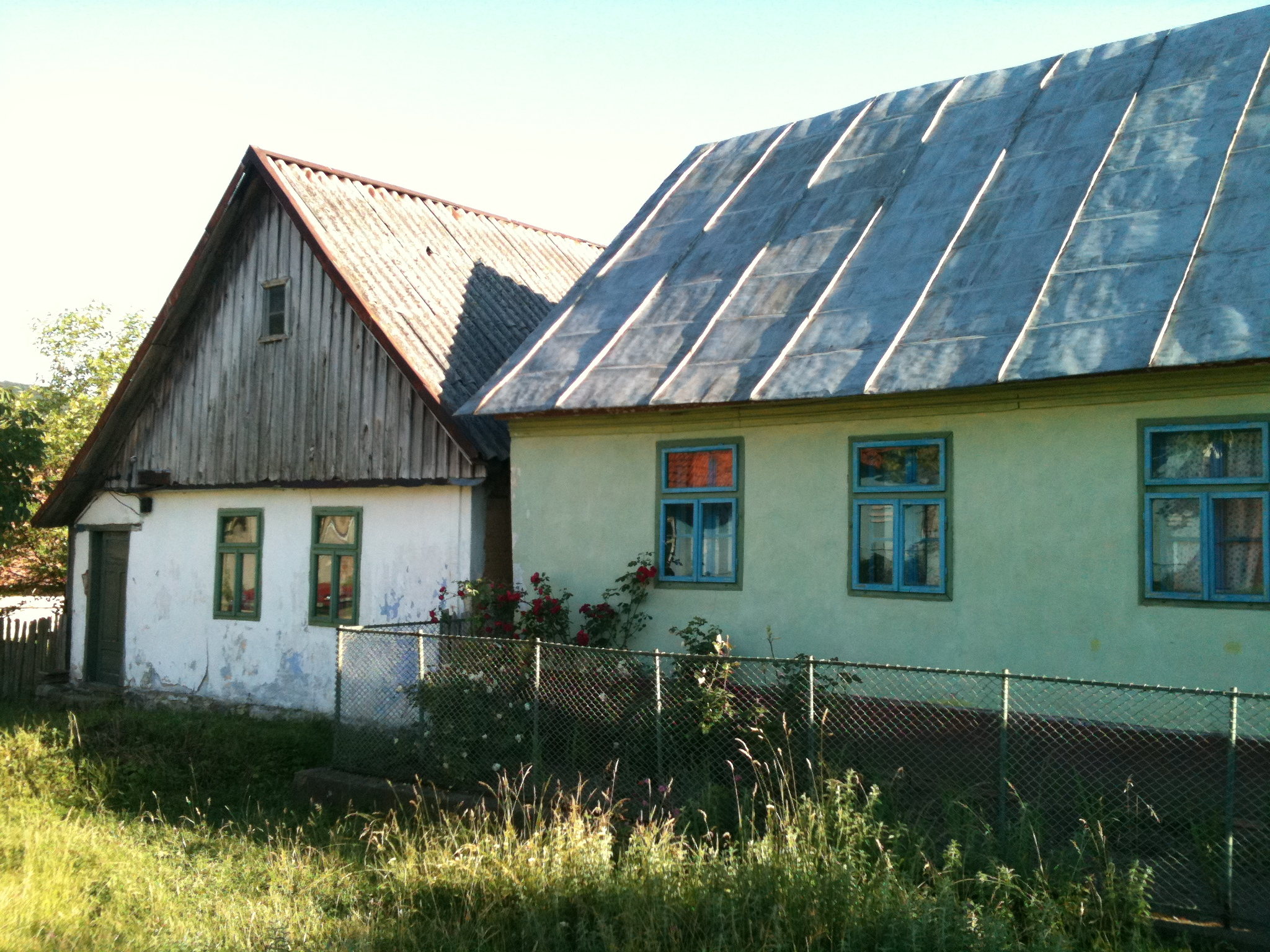
Houses in Bigăr

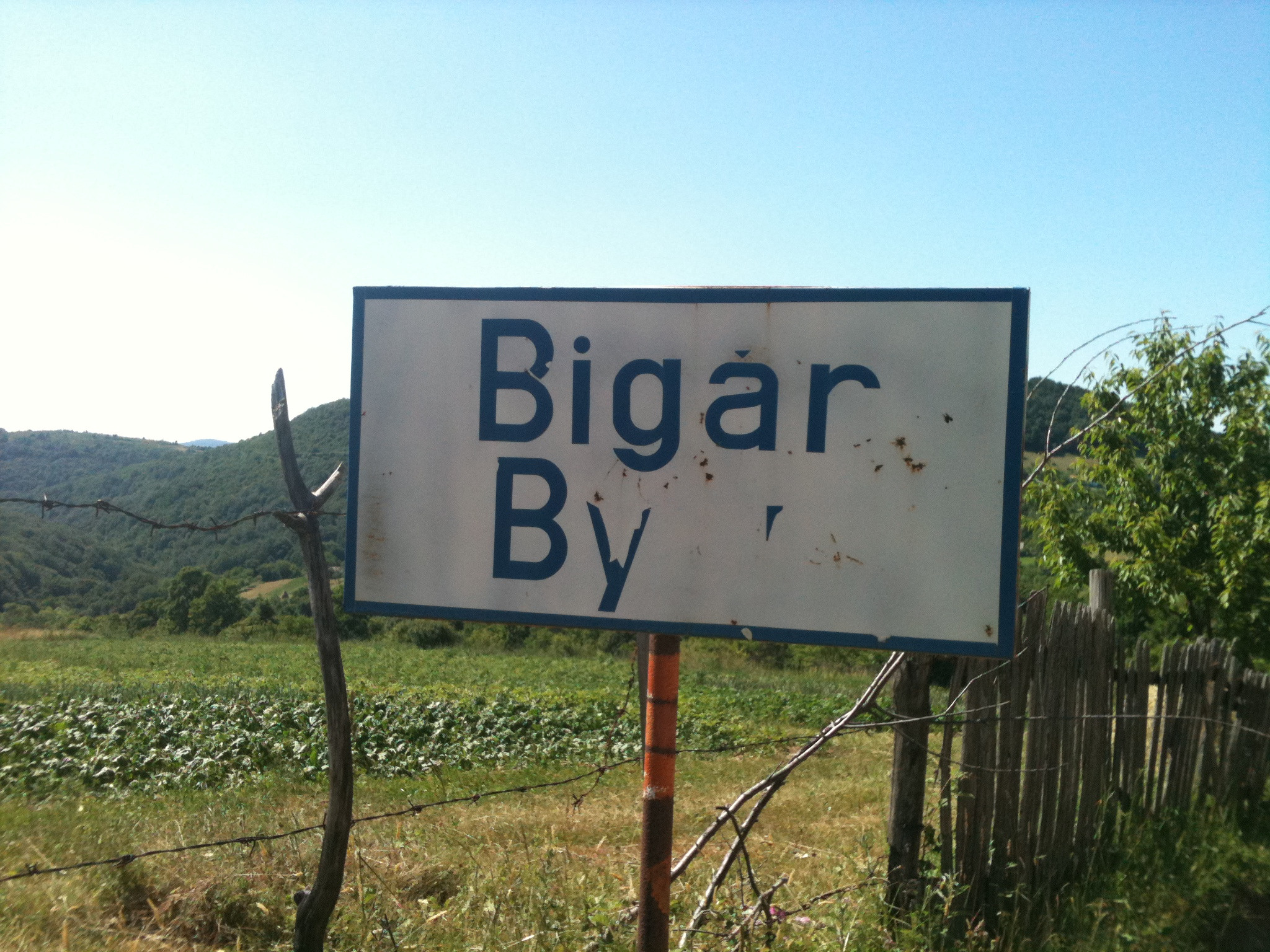
Bigăr village

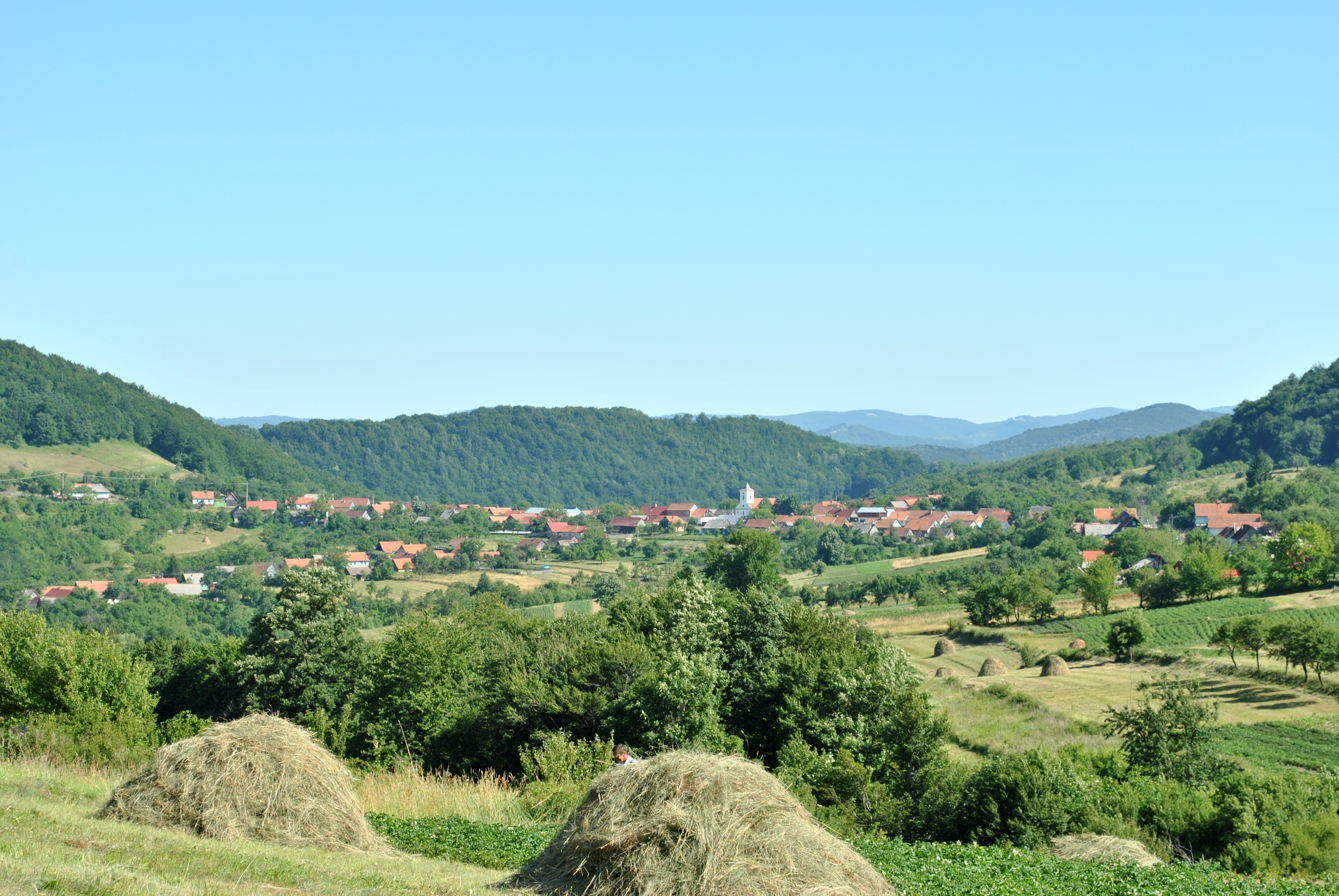
A view of the Bigăr village from a hill
