= Gârnic =

- Commune
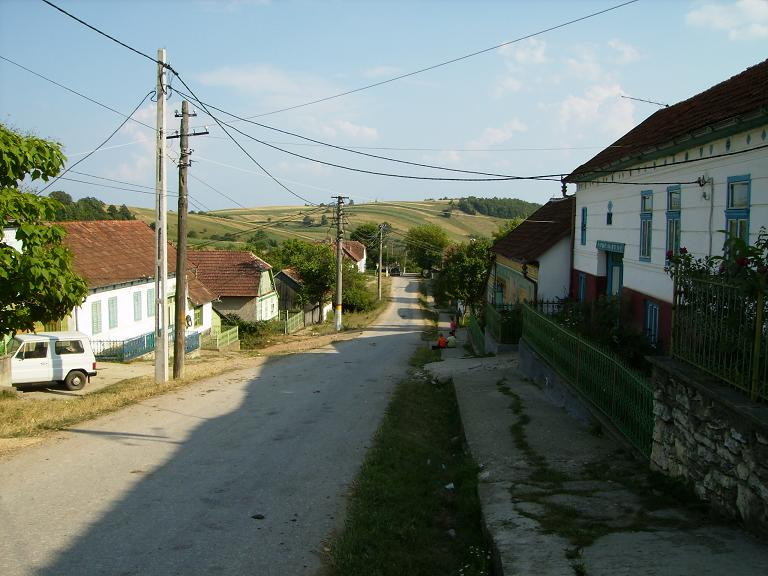

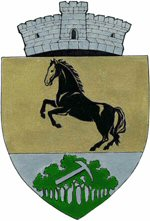
- Coat of arms

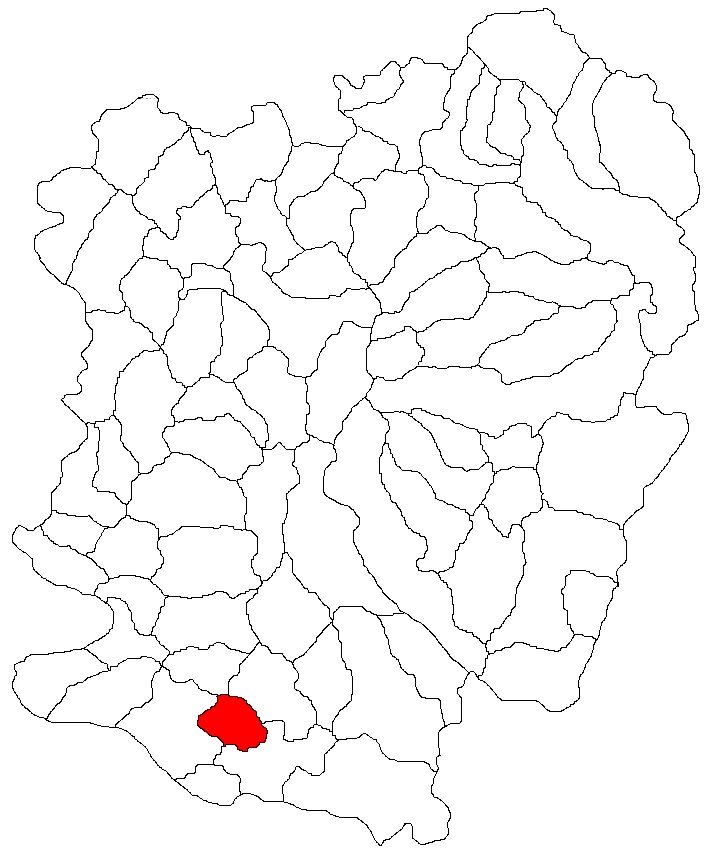
- Location in Caraș-Severin County

- Location in Romania
- Coordinates: 44°47′N 21°48′E
- Country: Romania
- County: Caraș-Severin

Government
  - Mayor (2024–2028): Ion Sporea (ADU)
- Area: 36.62 km^{2} (14.14 sq mi)
- Elevation: 600 m (2,000 ft)
- Population (2021-12-01): 975
  - Density: 26.6/km^{2} (69.0/sq mi)
- Time zone: UTC+02:00 (EET)
  - Summer (DST): UTC+03:00 (EEST)
- Postal code: 327215
- Area code: (+40) 0255
- Vehicle reg.: CS
- Website: www.primariagarnic.ro

Gârnic (Czech: Gerník; German: Weitzenried; Hungarian: Szörénybúzás) is a commune in Caraș-Severin County, western Romania. It is composed of two villages, Gârnic and Padina Matei (Mátévölgye).

Historical population
Year	Pop.	±%
1880	1,376	—
1910	1,847	+34.2%
1930	2,116	+14.6%
1977	1,841	−13.0%
2002	1,533	−16.7%
2011	1,268	−17.3%
2021	975	−23.1%
Source: Census data

At the 2021 census, the commune had a population of 975; of those, 63.28% were Romanians and 16.92% Czechs.
