= Berzasca (river) =

- Location within Romania

Location
- Country: Romania
- Counties: Caraș-Severin County
- Villages: Berzasca

Physical characteristics
- Mouth: Danube
  - location: Berzasca
  - coordinates: 44.6461°N 21.9485°E
- Length: 46 km (29 mi)
- Basin size: 229 km^{2} (88 sq mi)

Basin features
- Progression: Danube→ Black Sea
- Tributaries
  - left: Dragostele
  - right: Ilova, Camenița, Toronița

The Berzasca is a left tributary of the river Danube in Romania. It discharges into the Danube in the village Berzasca. Its length is 46 km (29 mi) and its basin size is 229 km^{2} (88 sq mi).
