= Dubova, Mehedinți =

Dubova
- Commune
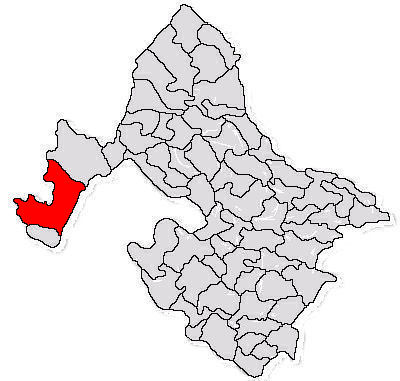
- Location in Mehedinți County

- Location in Romania
- Coordinates: 44°37′N 22°16′E
- Country: Romania
- County: Mehedinți
- Area: 164.43 km^{2} (63.49 sq mi)
- Population (2021-12-01): 716
  - Density: 4.35/km^{2} (11.3/sq mi)
- Time zone: UTC+02:00 (EET)
  - Summer (DST): UTC+03:00 (EEST)
- Vehicle reg.: MH

Dubova (Hungarian and Czech: Dubova) is a commune located in Mehedinți County, Romania. It is one of four localities in the county located in the Banat. The commune is composed of three villages: Baia Nouă, Dubova and Eibenthal. Ethnically, it is 59% Romanian, 36.5% Czech and 3% Roma, making it the locality with the highest proportion of Czechs in Romania.

In Romanian	In Hungarian	In Czech
Baia Nouă	Tiszafaiújbánya	Nové Doly or Ujbányje
Dubova	Dubova	Dubova
Eibenthal	Tiszafa	Eibentál or Tisové Údolí
