= Cecília Rozgonyi =

Female military commander in the Ottoman Wars

Cecília Rozgonyi (1398– between 1436 and 1439) was a late mediaeval Hungarian noblewoman known for fighting against Ottoman invaders. Her given name also appears as Cecilia, Cicelle, or Cziczelle and her surname as Rozgoni; she is sometimes mentioned as Rozgonyiné, 'wife of Rozgonyi', or with her maiden name as Cecília Szentgyörgyi or Szent-Györgyi.

She was the daughter of Count Péter III Szentgyörgyi (died 1446), from an ancient and important Hungarian noble family. Many of her male ancestors had been renowned military leaders, including her father. She had five brothers who all served the royal family in different civil and military positions. Cecília married another member of the kingdom's elite, Stephen Rozgonyi, ispán of Pozsony and Temes Counties, and had three sons with him: John, Stephen, and Emeric.

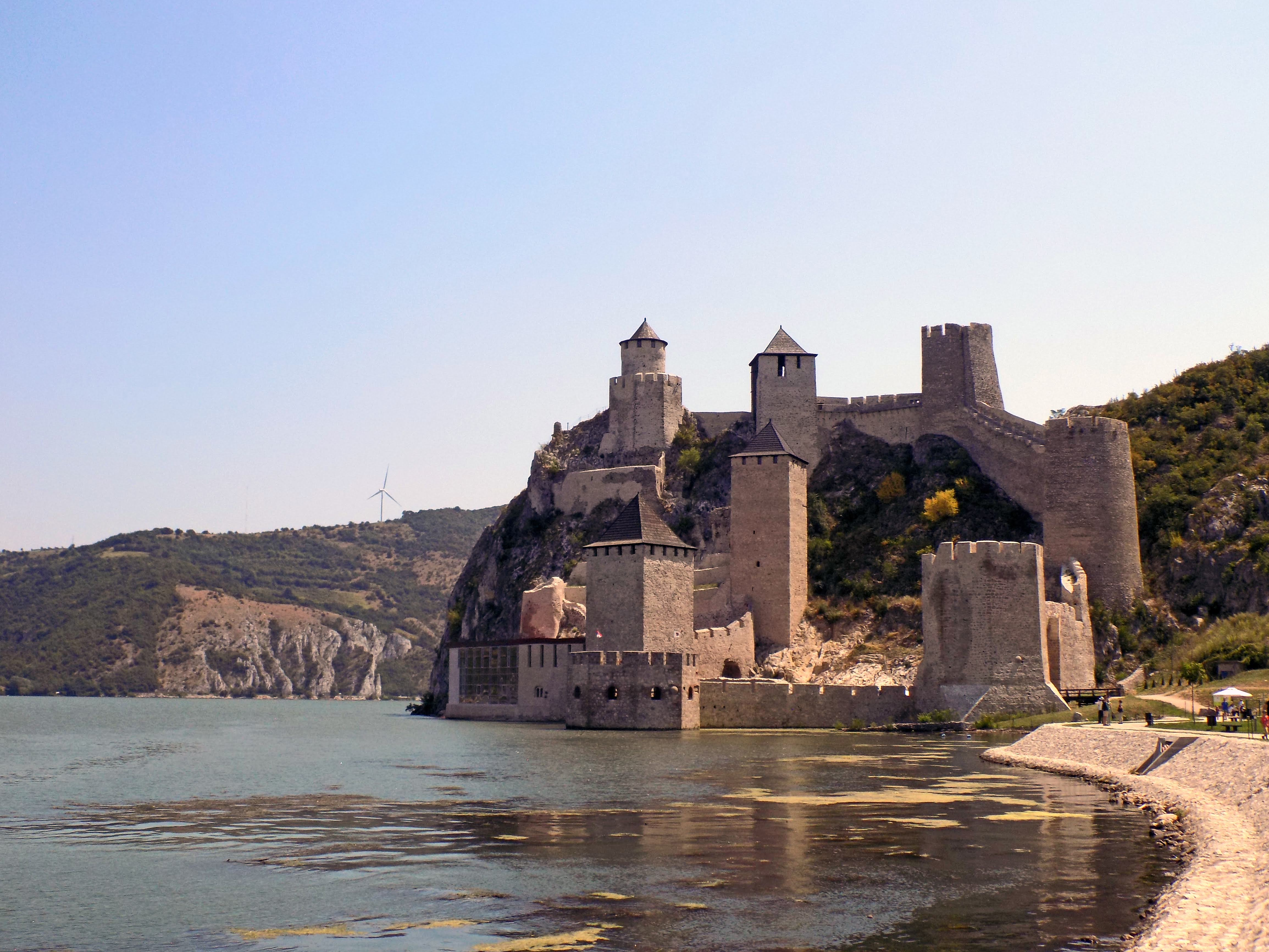
Golubac Fortress with the Danube.

In 1428, the Hungarian army besieged the Golubac Fortress which was held by the invading Ottoman Empire, one of the leaders of the offensive being Ispán Rozgonyi. Cecília commanded a ship, or even a division of ships on the Danube. She engaged many enemy ships in fighting and sank or set on fire multiple among them, and eventually shelled the fortress itself from the ship. When Sultan Murad II came to the aid of his attacked men, Sigismund, Holy Roman Emperor and King of Hungary saw that he had no chance of taking the castle. He asked for a ceasefire, which the sultan granted. The Hungarian army started crossing the Danube, but while the king was still on the enemy side, the Ottomans attacked the retreating army and slaughtered most soldiers. According to one account, the king was only rescued because of the intervention of Cecília Rozgonyi on her ship. Her bravery is attested to by a 1434 charter of King Sigismund in which he gave her some lands as a reward.
