= Stephen Rozgonyi =

Hungarian noble (died after 1440)

Stephen Rozgonyi (d. after 1440), son of Ladislaus, was ispán (comes) of Temes County between 1427 and 1438. He married twice, first to Cecília Rozgonyi by whom he had three sons, John, Stephen, and Emeric, and second to Anna Dezsőfi de Losoncz.

He participated in the siege of Golubac in May 1428.
