= Sichevița =

- Commune
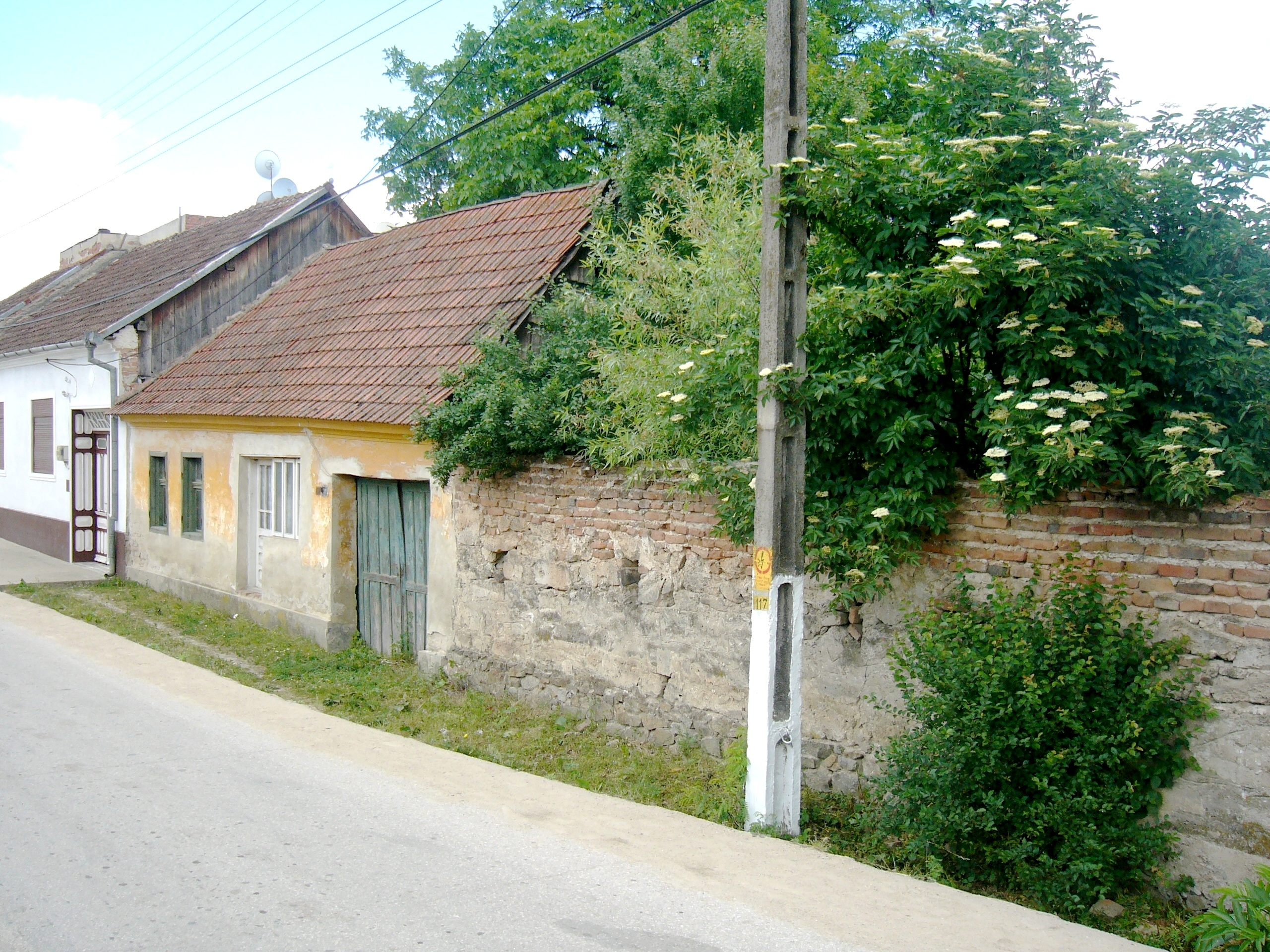
- House in Sichevița where the poet Ion Pena lived between 1936 and 1941

- Coat of arms

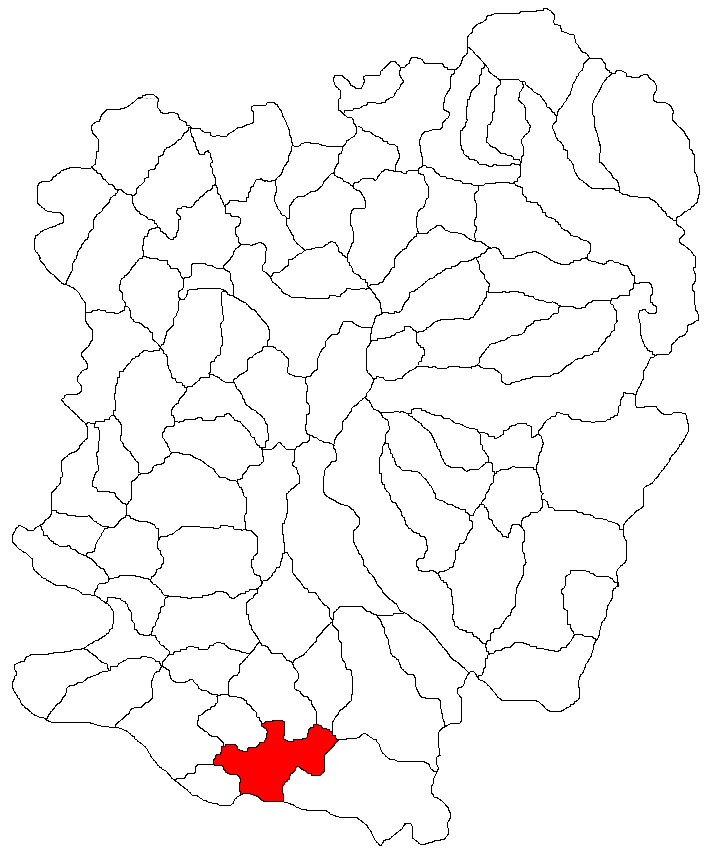
- Location in Caraș-Severin County

- Location in Romania
- Coordinates: 44°44′N 21°51′E
- Country: Romania
- County: Caraș-Severin

Government
  - Mayor (2024–2028): Ilie Jurca (PNL)
- Area: 105.7 km^{2} (40.8 sq mi)
- Elevation: 108 m (354 ft)
- Population (2021-12-01): 1,891
  - Density: 17.89/km^{2} (46.34/sq mi)
- Time zone: UTC+02:00 (EET)
  - Summer (DST): UTC+03:00 (EEST)
- Postal code: 327335
- Area code: (+40) 02 55
- Vehicle reg.: CS
- Website: comunasichevita.ro

Sichevița (Hungarian: Szikesfalu) is a commune in Caraș-Severin County, western Romania with a population of 1,891 people as of 2021. It is composed of nineteen villages: Brestelnic, Camenița, Cârșie, Cracu Almăj, Crușovița, Curmătura, Frăsiniș, Gornea (Felsőlupkó), Liborajdea, Lucacevăț, Martinovăț, Ogașu Podului, Sichevița, Streneac, Valea Orevița, Valea Ravensca (Ravenszkavölgy), Valea Sicheviței, Zănou, and Zăsloane.

== Natives ==
- Antonie Iorgovan (1948 – 2007), jurist, professor, and politician
