= Lunca =

Lunca ("the meadow") may refer to several places in Romania:

== Populated places ==
- Lunca, Bihor, a commune in Bihor County
- Lunca, Botoșani, a commune in Botoșani County
- Lunca, Mureș, a commune in Mureș County
- Lunca, Teleorman, a commune in Teleorman County
- Lunca, a village in Lupșa Commune, Alba County
- Lunca, a village in Poșaga Commune, Alba County
- Lunca, a village in Valea Lungă Commune, Alba County
- Lunca, a village in Vidra Commune, Alba County
- Lunca, a village in Boteni Commune, Argeș County
- Lunca, a village in Șieuț Commune, Bistrița-Năsăud County
- Lunca, a village in Amaru Commune, Buzău County
- Lunca, a village in Vârfu Câmpului Commune, Botoșani County
- Lunca, a village in C.A. Rosetti Commune, Buzău County
- Lunca, a village in Puiești Commune, Buzău County
- Lunca, a village in Valea Argovei Commune, Călărași County
- Lunca, a village in Moroeni Commune, Dâmbovița County
- Lunca, a village in Voinești Commune, Dâmbovița County
- Lunca, a village in Jorăști Commune, Galați County
- Lunca, a village in Baia de Criș Commune, Hunedoara County
- Lunca, a village in Băița Commune, Hunedoara County
- Lunca, a village in Grajduri Commune, Iași County
- Lunca, a village in Borca Commune, Neamț County
- Lunca, a village in Oniceni Commune, Neamț County
- Lunca, a village in Vânători-Neamț Commune, Neamț County
- Lunca, a village in Tătulești Commune, Olt County
- Lunca, a village in Zamostea Commune, Suceava County
- Lunca, a village in Ceamurlia de Jos Commune, Tulcea County
- Lunca, a village in Gherghești Commune, Vaslui County
- Lunca, a village in Bujoreni Commune, Vâlcea County
- Lunca, a district in the town of Pașcani, Iași County
- Lunca, a district in the town of Milișăuți, Suceava County
- Lunca, a district in the town of Ocnele Mari, Vâlcea County
- Lunca, a district in the town of Pătârlagele, Buzău County
- Lunca, the Romanian name for Lunka Commune, Hertsa Region, Ukraine
- Cornu Luncii, a commune in Suceava County
- Lunca Banului, a commune in Vaslui County, and its village of Lunca Veche
- Lunca Bradului, a commune in Mureș County
- Lunca Cernii de Jos, a commune in Hunedoara County
- Lunca Corbului, a commune in Argeș County
- Lunca de Jos and Lunca de Sus, communes in Harghita County
- Lunca Ilvei, a commune in Bistrița-Năsăud County
- Lunca Mureșului, a commune in Alba County
- Dosu Luncii, Drăgoiești-Luncă, Lunca Bisericii, Lunca de Jos, Lunca Goiești and Lunca Vesești, villages in Vidra Commune, Alba County
- Lunca Ampoiței and Lunca Meteșului, villages in Meteș Commune, Alba County
- Lunca Apei, a village in Apa Commune, Satu Mare County
- Lunca Asău, a village in Asău Commune, Bacău County
- Lunca Borlesei, a village in Spermezeu Commune, Bistrița-Năsăud County
- Lunca Câlnicului, a village in Prejmer Commune, Brașov County
- Lunca Cetăţuii, a village in Ciurea Commune, Iași County
- Lunca Dochiei, a village in Urechești Commune, Bacău County
- Lunca Florii and Lunca Zaicii, villages in Cornereva Commune, Caraș-Severin County
- Lunca Frumoasă, a village in Pârscov Commune, Buzău County
- Lunca Gârtii, a village in Stoenești Commune, Argeș County
- Lunca Jariştei, a village in Siriu Commune, Buzău County
- Lunca Largă, villages in Bistra and in Ocoliș Communes, Alba County
- Lunca la Tisa, a village in Bocicoiu Mare Commune, Maramureș County
- Lunca Leşului, a village in Leșu Commune, Bistriţa-Năsăud County
- Lunca Mare, a village in Șotrile Commune, Prahova County
- Lunca Mărcușului, a village in Dobârlău Commune, Covasna County
- Lunca Merilor, a village in Bistra Commune, Alba County
- Lunca Moldovei, a village in Păstrăveni Commune, Neamț County
- Lunca Ozunului, a village in Ozun Commune, Covasna County
- Lunca Prahovei, a village in Măgureni Commune, Prahova County
- Lunca Priporului, a district in the town of Nehoiu, Buzău County
- Lunca Rateș, a village in Scânteia Commune, Iași County
- Lunca Sătească, a village in Târlișua Commune, Bistriţa-Năsăud County
- Lunca Vişagului, a village in Poieni Commune, Cluj County
- Lunca Târnavei, a village in Șona Commune, Alba County
- Valea Luncii, a village in Mica Commune, Cluj County
- Lunca Teuzului, the former name of Vasile Goldiș village, Beliu Commune, Arad County

== Rivers ==
- Lunca, a tributary of the Ciunca in Iași County
- Lunca, a tributary of the Jijia in Botoșani County
- Lunca (Olt), a tributary of the Olt in Harghita County
- Lunca, a tributary of the Valea Lungă in Bistrița-Năsăud County
- Lunca Mare, a tributary of the Olt in Harghita County
- Lunca Meteșului, a tributary of the Ampoița in Alba County

== See also ==
- Luncile (disambiguation)
- Luncani (disambiguation)
- Luncșoara (disambiguation)
- Luncavița (disambiguation)
