= Valea Luncii River =

Valea Luncii River may refer to:

- Valea Luncii, a tributary of the Beiușele in Bihor County, Romania
- Valea Luncii, a tributary of the Dâmbovița in Argeș County, Romania

== See also ==
- Valea Luncii
- Lunca River (disambiguation)
- Luncuța River (disambiguation)
- Luncavița River (disambiguation)
- Luncșoara River (disambiguation)
