= Feneș =

Feneș may refer to several places in Romania:

- Feneș (Hungarian: Fenes), a district in the town of Zlatna, Alba County
- Feneș, a village in Armeniș Commune, Caraș-Severin County
- Feneș (Ampoi), a tributary of the Ampoi in Alba County
- Feneș (Feernic), a tributary of the Feernic in Harghita County
- Feneș (Someș), a tributary of the Someșul Mic in Cluj County
- Feneș (Timiș), a tributary of the Timiș in Caraș-Severin County

== See also ==
- Fenes, Nordland, a village in Bodø, Norway
