= Albele River =

Albele River may refer to the following rivers in Romania:

- Albele, a tributary of the Jaleș in Gorj County
- Albele, an alternative name for Lupul River (Tazlău) in Bacău County

== See also ==
- Albac River (disambiguation)
- Albești River (disambiguation)
- Râul Alb (disambiguation)
- Izvorul Alb River (disambiguation)
