= Luncuța River =

Luncuța River may refer to:

- Luncuța River (Paroș)
- Luncuța, a tributary of the Săliște in Sibiu County

== See also ==
- Lunca River (disambiguation)
- Luncavița River (disambiguation)
- Luncșoara River (disambiguation)
