= Dobricel =

- Location within Romania

Location
- Country: Romania
- Counties: Bistrița-Năsăud County
- Villages: Dobricel, Dobric

Physical characteristics
- Mouth: Ilișua
  - location: Dobric
  - coordinates: 47.2341°N 24.1271°E
- Length: 14 km (8.7 mi)
- Basin size: 40 km^{2} (15 sq mi)

Basin features
- Progression: Ilișua→ Someșul Mare→ Someș→ Tisza→ Danube→ Black Sea

The Dobricel is a right tributary of the river Ilișua in Romania. It flows into the Ilișua in Dobric. Its length is 14 km (8.7 mi) and its basin size is 40 km^{2} (15 sq mi).
