= Ilișua =

Ilişua may refer to several places in Romania:

- Ilișua, Bistrița-Năsăud, a village in Uriu Commune, Bistrița-Năsăud County
- Ilișua, Sălaj, a village in Sărmășag Commune, Sălaj County
- Ilișua (river), a tributary of the Someșul Mare in Bistrița-Năsăud County
