= Bucerdea =

- Location within Romania

Location
- Country: Romania
- Counties: Alba County
- Villages: Bucerdea Vinoasă, Șard

Physical characteristics
- Mouth: Ighiu
  - location: Șard
  - coordinates: 46.1339°N 23.5323°E
- Length: 15 km (9.3 mi)
- Basin size: 22 km^{2} (8.5 sq mi)

Basin features
- Progression: Ighiu→ Ampoi→ Mureș→ Tisza→ Danube→ Black Sea

The Bucerdea is a left tributary of the river Ighiu in Romania. It flows into the Ighiu in Șard. Its length is 15 km (9.3 mi) and its basin size is 22 km^{2} (8.5 sq mi).
