= Vâltori =

Vâltori may refer to several places in Romania:

- Vâltori, a village in the town of Zlatna, Alba County
- Vâltori, a village in Vadu Moţilor Commune, Alba County
- Vâltori (river), tributary of the Ampoi in Alba County
