= Telna =

Telna may refer to:

- Țelna, a village in Ighiu commune, Alba County, Romania
- Țelna, a river in the Apuseni Mountains, Alba County, western Romania
- Telecom North America, which uses the telna brand
- Talne, a city in Cherkasy Oblast (province) of Ukraine, sometimes misspelled Telna
