= Țelna =

- Location within Romania

Location
- Country: Romania
- Counties: Alba County
- Villages: Țelna

Physical characteristics
- Mouth: Ighiu
  - location: Ighiu
  - coordinates: 46°08′24″N 23°31′30″E
- Length: 15 km (9.3 mi)
- Basin size: 29 km^{2} (11 sq mi)

Basin features
- Progression: Ighiu→ Ampoi→ Mureș→ Tisza→ Danube→ Black Sea

The Țelna is a left tributary of the river Ighiu in Romania. It flows into the Ighiu in the village Ighiu. Its length is 15 km (9.3 mi) and its basin size is 29 km^{2} (11 sq mi).
