= Dumbrăvița (Ilișua) =

- Location within Romania

Location
- Country: Romania
- Counties: Bistrița-Năsăud County
- Villages: Perișor, Dumbrăvița

Physical characteristics
- Mouth: Ilișua
  - location: near Căianu Mic
  - coordinates: 47.2485°N 24.1674°E
- Length: 16 km (9.9 mi)
- Basin size: 31 km^{2} (12 sq mi)

Basin features
- Progression: Ilișua→ Someșul Mare→ Someș→ Tisza→ Danube→ Black Sea

The Dumbrăvița is a left tributary of the Ilișua in Romania. It flows into the Ilișua near Căianu Mic. Its length is 16 km (9.9 mi) and its basin size is 31 km^{2} (12 sq mi).
