= Zsófia Torma =

Hungarian archaeologist

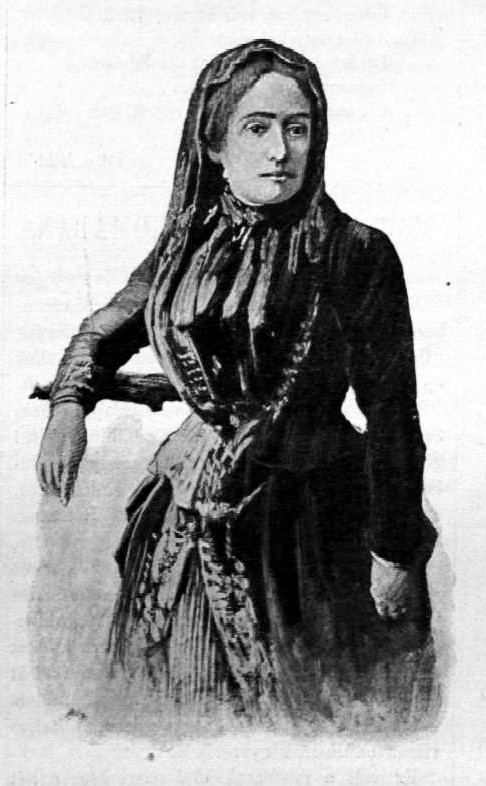
- Newspaper portrait of Torma
- Born: 26 September 1832; Csicsókeresztúr, Austria-Hungary (present-day Cristeștii Ciceului)
- Died: 14 November 1899 (aged 67); Szászváros, Austria-Hungary (present-day Orăștie)
- Occupations: Archaeologist, anthropologist, paleontologist

Zsófia Torma (26 September 1832 – 14 November 1899) was a Hungarian archaeologist, anthropologist and paleontologist.

== Life and work ==
Torma was born in Csicsókeresztúr, Beszterce-Naszód County, Austria-Hungary (today Cristeștii Ciceului, Bistrița-Năsăud County, Romania). After her parents died, she moved with her sister to Szászváros, now in Romania, where she began to study the snail farms she found in Hunedoara County.

Torma was mostly self-educated. In 1875, she was encouraged by Flóris Rómer, considered by some to be the father of Hungarian archeology, to begin her own excavations of the ancient settlement of Tordos (present-dat Turdaș), along the Mureș River. The symbols and scripts on clay objects she found during an excavation in Hunyad County became an archaeological sensation. She also found artifacts of the 6,000- to 7,000-year-old Tordos culture, some of which were covered with Vinča symbols. According to Gizella,

Zsófia Torma was the first to discover the Neolithic culture of Tordos, drawing attention to the connection between the signs of Tordos and the Assyrian-Babylonian literacy, the penetration of Sumerian literature through Southeastern Europe. She worked in Tordos for twenty years, more than thirty years before the discovery of the carefully collected, extremely valuable finds and dissertations on them, as the Vinca-Tordos culture was only explored in 1908.

Torma had severe financial problems caused by her self-funded excavations. She also struggled with archeologists in her own country, who "ridiculed and ignored her, as a woman and amateur in the field of archaeology, as well as her groundbreaking ideas and efforts." However, her finds and writings found acceptance among foreign researchers who engaged in long correspondences with her.

Her most well-known work, the Ethnographische Analogien, was published in Jena, Germany, in 1894. Torma had an important role in the founding of the National Museum of Transylvanian History of Kolozsvár (present-day Cluj-Napoca). In her will, she left her collection of 10,387 archaeological pieces to the Transylvanian National Museum's Museum of Medals and Antiquities. On 24 May 1899, just a few months before her death, she became the first female to be named an honorary doctor at the Kolozsvári m. kir. Ferencz József Tudomány, what is today Babeș-Bolyai University.

Torma died in Szászváros (present-day Orăștie), on 14 November 1899.

== See also ==
- Timeline of women in science

== Notes ==
- Lozny, Ludomir R., ed. (2011). Comparative Archaeologies A Sociological View of the Science of the Past (1., neue Ausg. ed.). New York, NY: Springer New York. pp. 285, 305. ISBN 9781441982254.
- "Zsófia Torma". Pagina Municipiului Orăștie (in Romanian). Secui Adrian-Iulian. Archived from the original on 25 May 2014.
- The life work of Zsófia Torma in the Transylvanian Values Collection (in Hungarian)
