= Râul Alb =

Râul Alb may refer to the following rivers in Romania:

- Râul Alb, a tributary of the Bârzava in Caraș-Severin County
- Râul Alb (Dâmbovița), a tributary of the Dâmbovița in Dâmbovița County
- Râul Alb (Strei), a tributary of the Strei in Hunedoara County
- Râul Alb, a tributary of the Groșeni in Arad County
- Pârâul Alb (Timiș), a tributary of the Feneș in Caraș-Severin County

== See also ==
- Pârâul Alb (disambiguation)
- Izvorul Alb (disambiguation)
