= Albele =

Albele may refer to:

- A village in Bârsănești, a commune in Romania
- Albele River (disambiguation), the name of several rivers in Romania
