= Albești =

Albești may refer to the following places in Romania:

== Populated places ==
- Albești, Botoșani, a commune in Botoșani County
- Albești, Constanța, a commune in Constanța County
- Albești, Ialomița, a commune in Ialomița County
- Albești, Mureș, a commune in Mureș County
- Albești, Vaslui, a commune in Vaslui County
- Albești, a village in Albeștii de Muscel Commune, Argeș County
- Albești, a village in Răbăgani Commune, Bihor County
- Albești, a village in Smeeni Commune, Buzău County
- Albești, a village in Șimnicu de Sus Commune, Dolj County
- Albești, a village in Brăești Commune, Iași County
- Albești, a village in Poboru Commune, Olt County
- Albești, a village in Vedea Commune, Teleorman County
- Albești, a village in Delești Commune, Vaslui County

== Rivers ==
- Albești (Bahlueț), a tributary of the Bahlueț in Iași County
- Albești (Black Sea), a tributary of the Black Sea in Constanța County
- Albești (Cungrișoara), a tributary of the Cungrișoara in Olt County
