= Luncile =

Luncile may refer to several villages in Romania:

- Luncile, a village in Lopătari Commune, Buzău County
- Luncile, a village in Chiojdeni Commune, Vrancea County

== See also ==
- Lunca (disambiguation)
- Luncani (disambiguation)
- Luncșoara (disambiguation)
- Luncavița (disambiguation)
