= Alsóegres =

Alsóegres is the Hungarian name for two villages in Romania:

- Agrișu de Jos village, Șieu-Odorhei Commune, Bistrița-Năsăud County
- Agrieșel village, Târlișua Commune, Bistrița-Năsăud County
