= Albești (Black Sea) =

- Location within Romania

Location
- Country: Romania
- Counties: Constanța County
- Villages: Vâlcele, Cotu Văii, Vârtop, Albești

Physical characteristics
- Mouth: Black Sea
  - location: Mangalia
  - coordinates: 43.7998°N 28.5759°E
- Length: 25 km (16 mi)
- Basin size: 326 km^{2} (126 sq mi)

Basin features
- Tributaries
  - right: Luminița
- River code: XV.1.12

The Albești is a river in Constanța County, Romania. In the city Mangalia it flows into the Black Sea. Its length is 25 km (16 mi) and its basin size is 326 km^{2} (126 sq mi).
