= Pârâul Alb =

Pârâul Alb may refer to the following rivers in Romania:

- Pârâul Alb (Timiș), a tributary of the Feneș in Caraș-Severin County
- Pârâul Alb, a tributary of the Jiu in Gorj County
- Pârâul Alb, a tributary of the Orăștie in Hunedoara County
- Pârâul Alb, a tributary of the Secu in Neamț County
- Pârâul Alb, a tributary of the Telejenel in Prahova County
