= Vâltori (river) =

- Location within Romania

Location
- Country: Romania
- Counties: Alba County
- Villages: Runc, Vâltori, Zlatna

Physical characteristics
- Mouth: Ampoi
  - location: Zlatna
  - coordinates: 46.1088°N 23.2217°E
- Length: 14 km (8.7 mi)
- Basin size: 41 km^{2} (16 sq mi)

Basin features
- Progression: Ampoi→ Mureș→ Tisza→ Danube→ Black Sea

The Vâltori is a left tributary of the river Ampoi in Romania. It discharges into the Ampoi in Zlatna. Its length is 14 km (8.7 mi) and its basin size is 41 km^{2} (16 sq mi).
