= Castra of Ighiu =

Fort in the Roman province of Dacia

- Castra of Măgulici
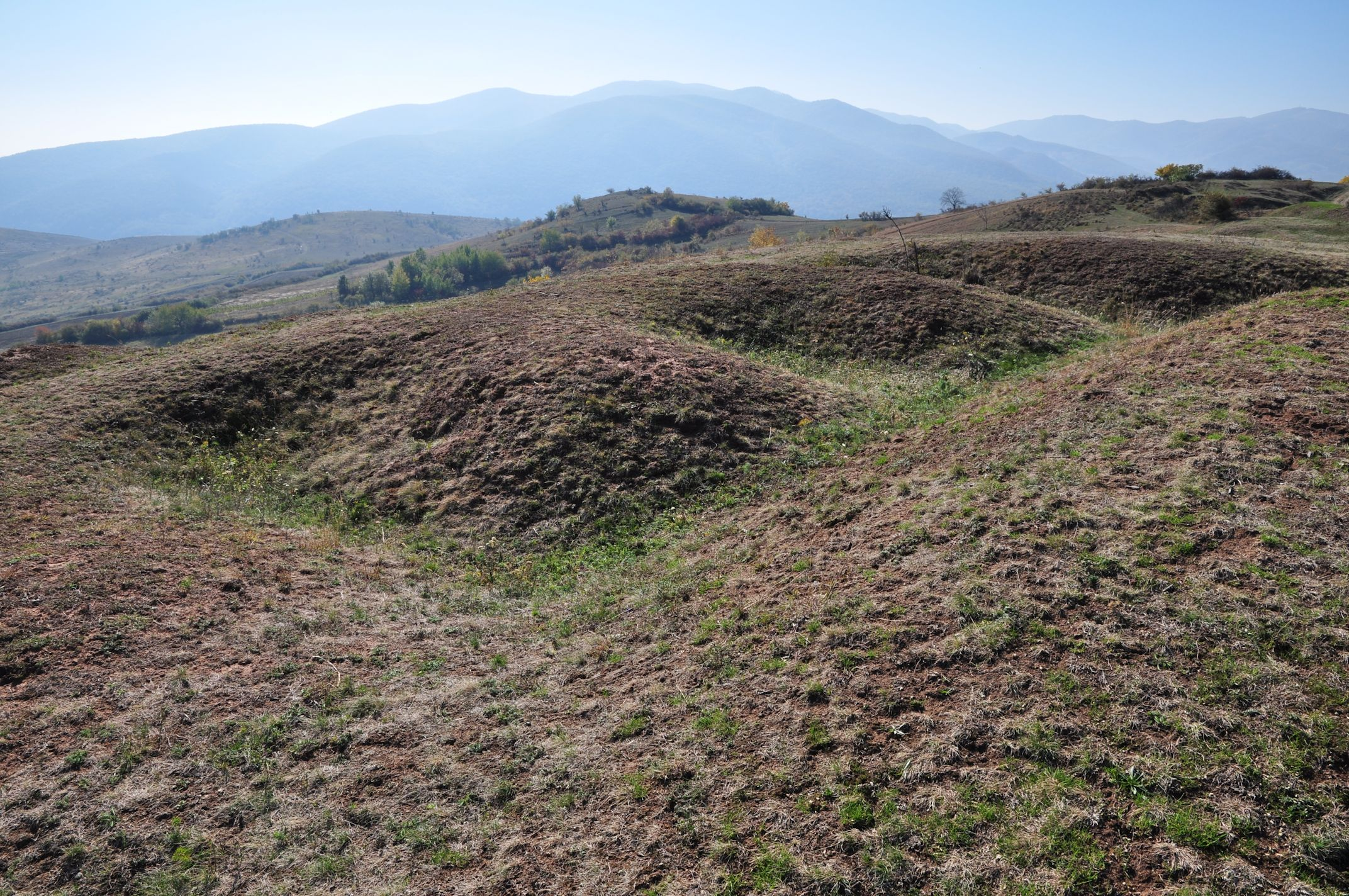

- Location within Romania
- 46°07′45.53″N 23°29′42.59″E
- Location: Măgulici, Ighiu, Alba, Romania

History
- Founded: unknown
- Abandoned: unknown

Site notes
- Archaeologists: Mihail Macrea
- Discovered: 1956
- Condition: Ruined

The Castra of Ighiu was a fort made of earth in the Roman province of Dacia. Its dating is uncertain. The traces of the earthwork can be identified on the Măguligici Hill in Ighiu (Romania).

== Măguligici Hill ==
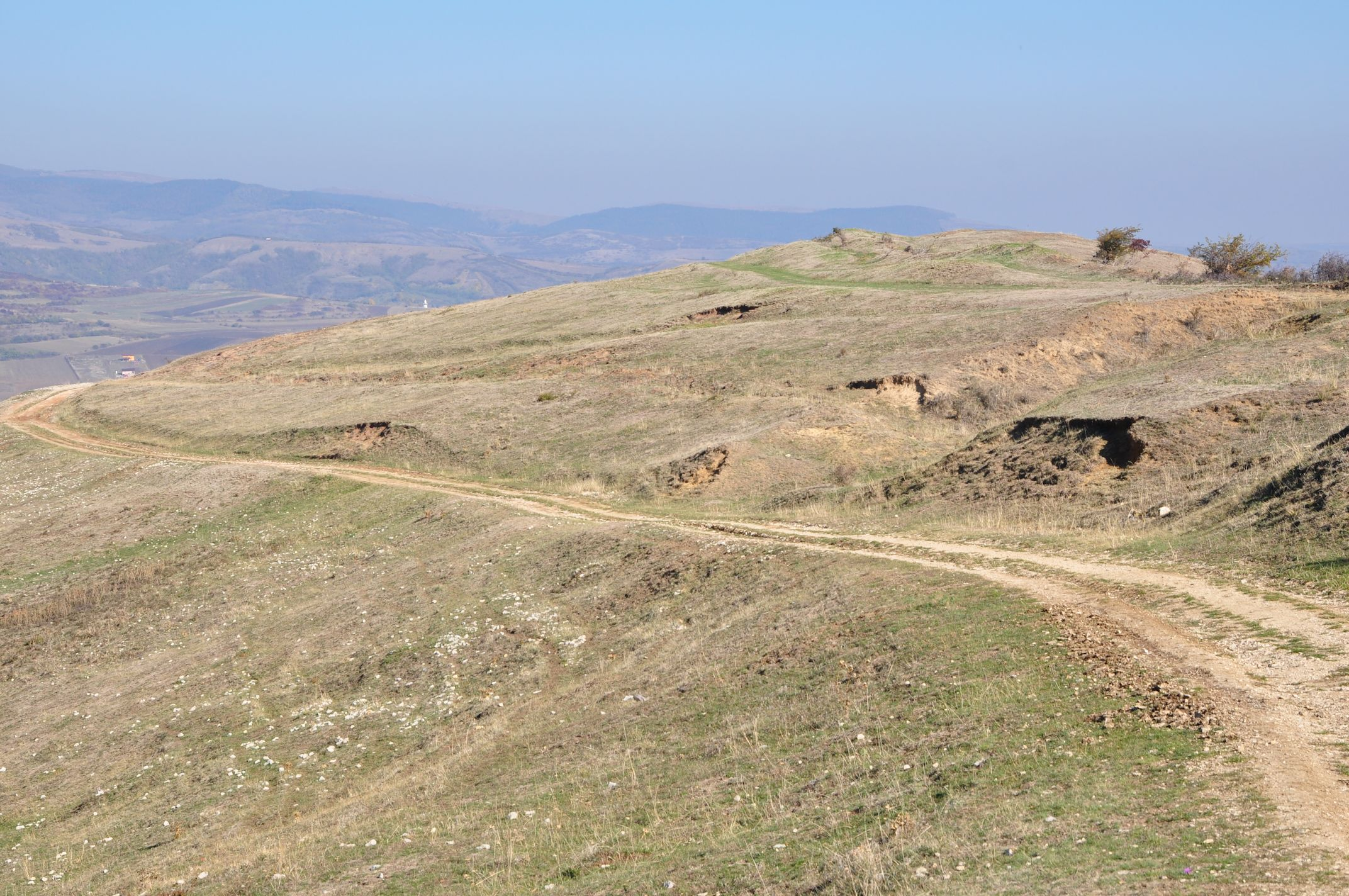

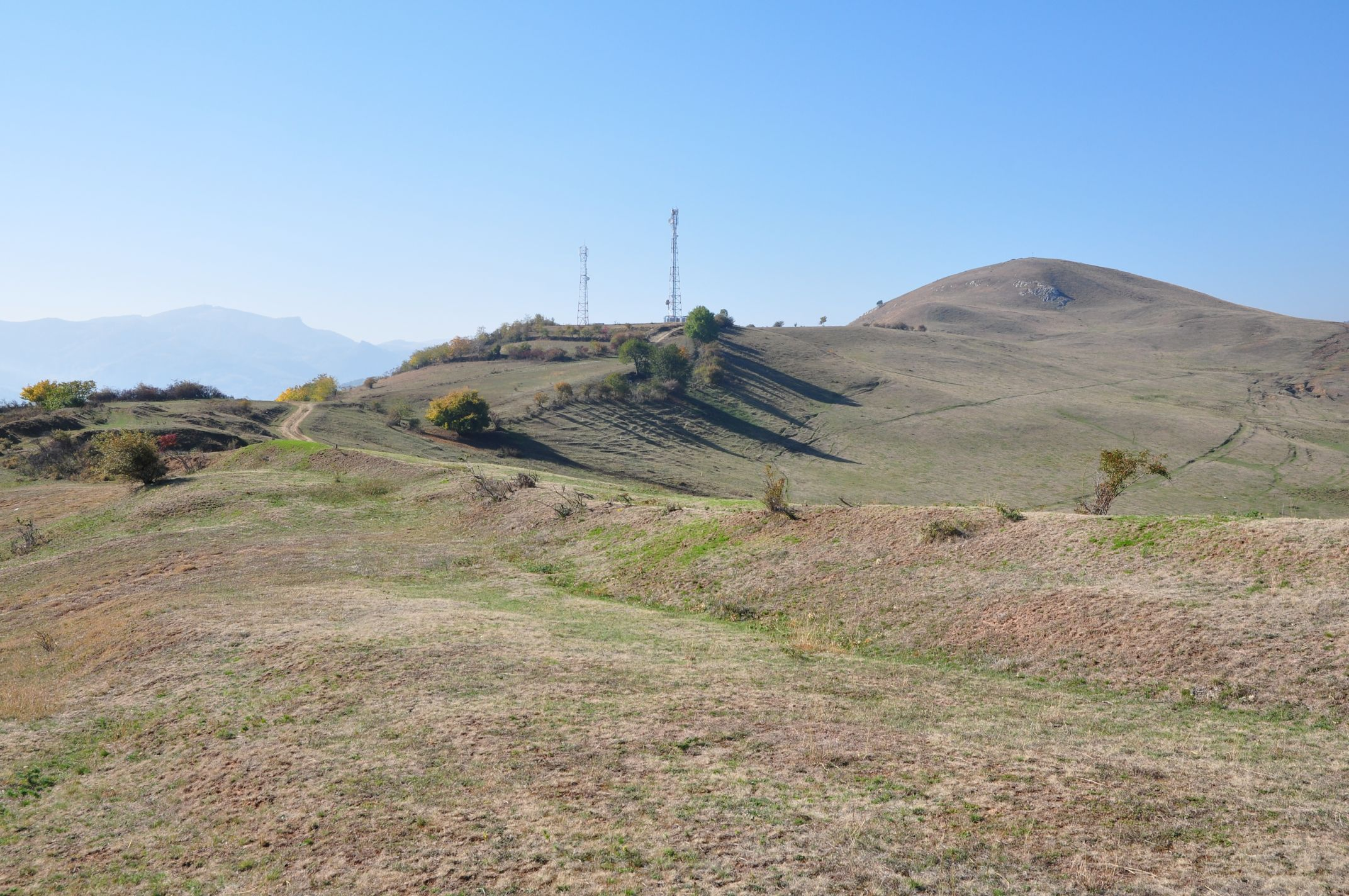

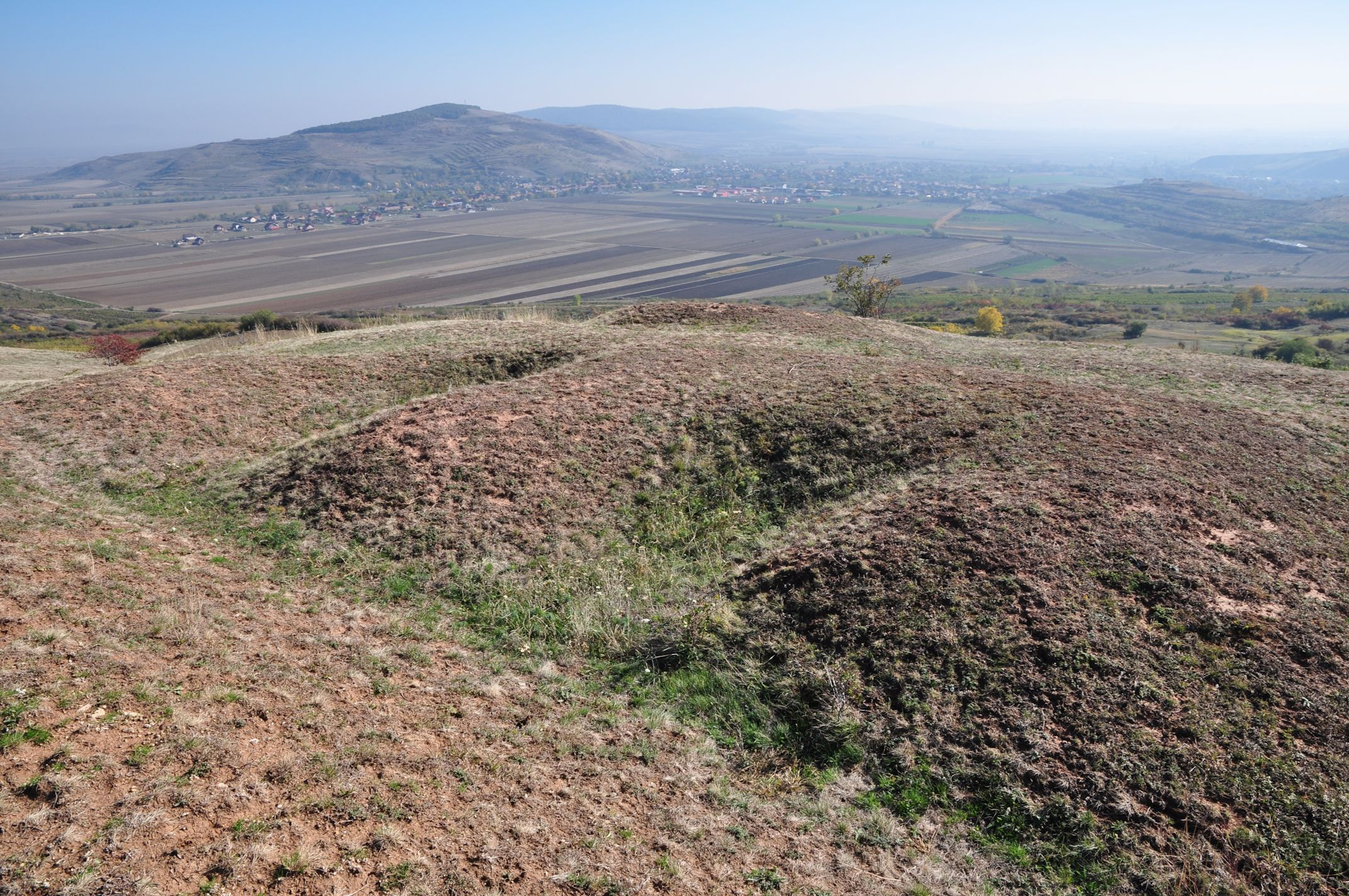

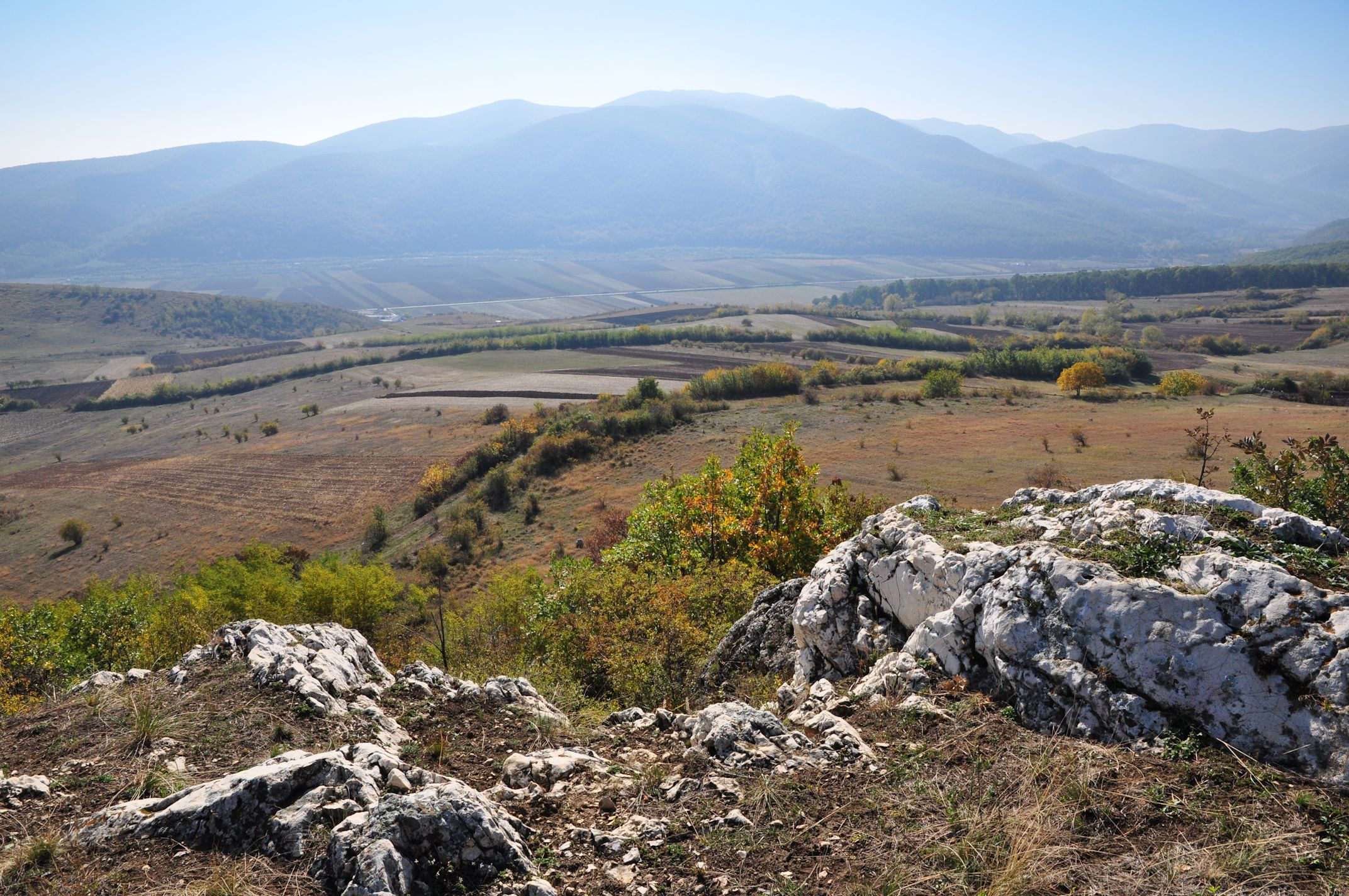

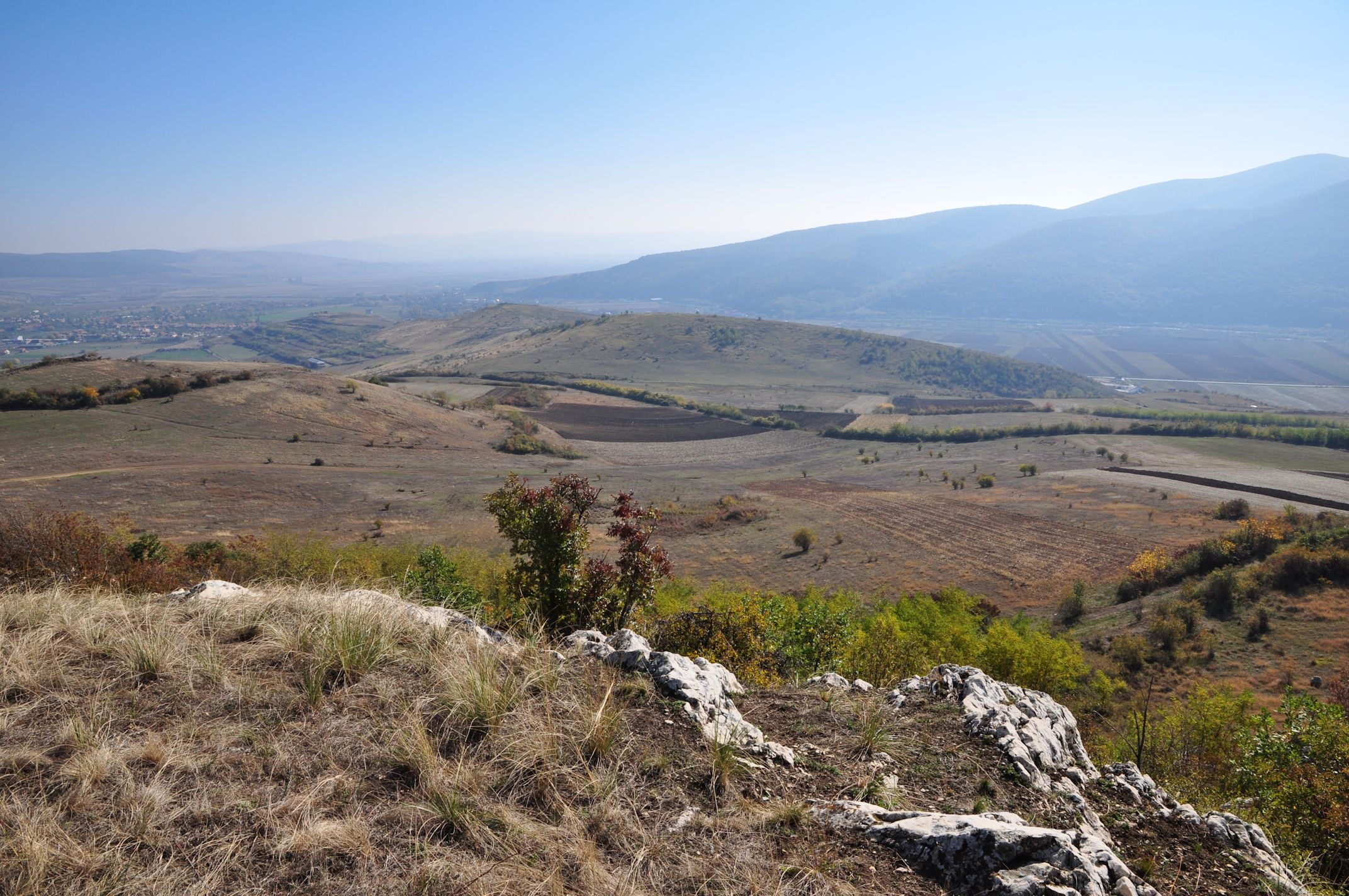

== See also ==
- List of castra
