= Ighiu (river) =

- Location within Romania

Location
- Country: Romania
- Counties: Alba County
- Villages: Ighiel, Ighiu

Physical characteristics
- Mouth: Ampoi
  - location: Șard
  - coordinates: 46.1163°N 23.5442°E
- Length: 18 km (11 mi)
- Basin size: 108 km^{2} (42 sq mi)

Basin features
- Progression: Ampoi→ Mureș→ Tisza→ Danube→ Black Sea
- Tributaries
  - left: Țelna, Bucerdea
  - right: Iezer

The Ighiu is a left tributary of the river Ampoi in Romania. It discharges into the Ampoi in Șard. Its length is 18 km (11 mi) and its basin size is 108 km^{2} (42 sq mi).
