= Ilișua (river) =

Tributary of the river Someșul Mare in Romania

- Location within Romania

Location
- Country: Romania
- Counties: Bistrița-Năsăud County
- Communes: Târlișua, Spermezeu, Căianu Mic, Uriu

Physical characteristics
- Mouth: Someșul Mare
  - location: Cristeștii Ciceului
  - coordinates: 47.1849°N 24.0793°E
- Length: 52 km (32 mi)
- Basin size: 353 km^{2} (136 sq mi)

Basin features
- Progression: Someșul Mare→ Someș→ Tisza→ Danube→ Black Sea
- Tributaries
  - left: Strâmba, Dumbrăvița
  - right: Valea Lungă, Dobricel

The Ilișua is a right tributary of the river Someșul Mare in Romania. It discharges into the Someșul Mare in Cristeștii Ciceului. Its length is 52 km (32 mi) and its basin size is 353 km^{2} (136 sq mi).
