= Izvorul Alb =

Izvorul Alb may refer to the following rivers in Romania:

- Izvorul Alb (Asău), a tributary of the Asău in Bacău County
- Izvorul Alb, a tributary of the Bistra Mărului
- Izvorul Alb, a tributary of the Bistrița in Neamț County
- Izvorul Alb, a tributary of the Cracăul Alb in Neamț County
- Izvorul Alb (Moldova), a tributary of the Moldova in Suceava County
- Izvorul Alb, a tributary of the Uz in Bacău County

== See also ==
- Albac (disambiguation)
- Izvorul (disambiguation)
- Râul Alb (disambiguation)
