= Feneș (Timiș) =

Feneș Pârâul Lung
- Location within Romania

Location
- Country: Romania
- Counties: Caraș-Severin County
- Villages: Feneș

Physical characteristics
- Source: Țarcu Mountains
- Mouth: Timiș
  - location: Upstream of Armeniș
  - coordinates: 45.1982°N 22.3123°E
- Length: 25 km (16 mi)
- Basin size: 134 km^{2} (52 sq mi)

Basin features
- Progression: Timiș→ Danube→ Black Sea
- Tributaries
  - left: Drăganu, Pârâul Alb

The Feneș is a tributary of the river Timiș in Romania. It discharges into the Timiș near Armeniș. The upper course of the river, upstream of the confluence with the Pârâul Alb, is also known as Pârâul Lung. Its length is 25 km (16 mi) and its basin size is 134 km^{2} (52 sq mi).
