= Ampoița =

- Location within Romania

Location
- Country: Romania
- Counties: Alba County
- Villages: Ampoița

Physical characteristics
- Mouth: Ampoi
  - location: Ampoița
  - coordinates: 46.1129°N 23.4931°E
- Length: 17 km (11 mi)
- Basin size: 52 km^{2} (20 sq mi)

Basin features
- Progression: Ampoi→ Mureș→ Tisza→ Danube→ Black Sea
- Tributaries
  - left: Lunca Meteșului

The Ampoița (Hungarian: Kisompoly) is a left tributary of the river Ampoi in Romania. It discharges into the Ampoi near the village Ampoița. Its length is 17 km (11 mi) and its basin size is 52 km^{2} (20 sq mi).
