= Péter Bod =

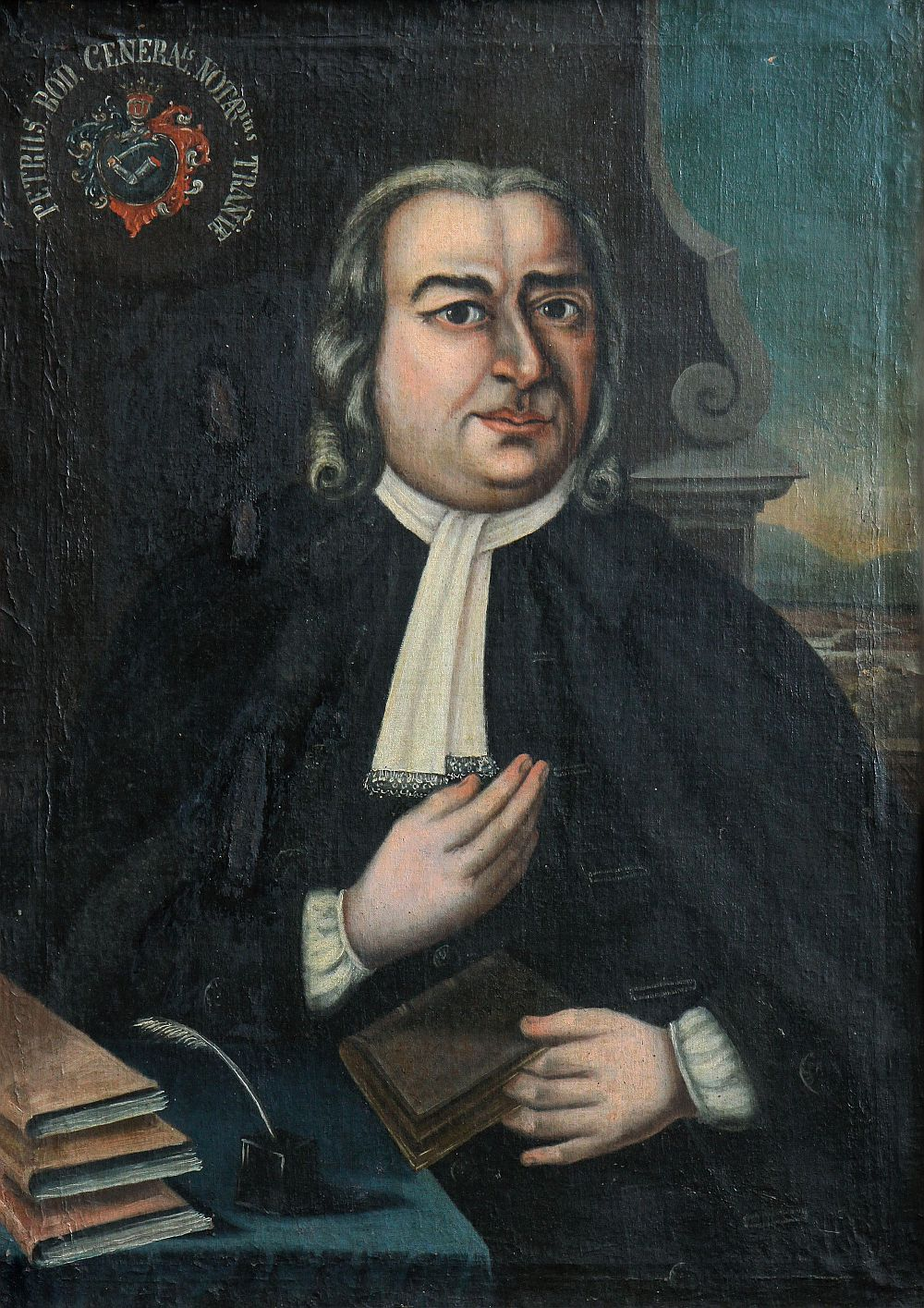
- Born: 22 February 1712; Cernatu de Sus
- Died: 2 March 1769
- Education: Bethlen College, Aiud, Leiden University
- Occupations: Literary historian, pastor, theologian, historian, librarian, literary scholar, parson
- Employer: Bethlen College, Aiud

Péter Bod or Peter Bod (22 February 1712 – 1768) was a Hungarian theologian and historian.

== Biography ==
Bod was born on 22 February 1712 in Felső-Csernáton, in Transylvania. He studied at Nagy-Enyed, where he also was appointed librarian and professor of Hebrew. In 1740 he went to Leyden to complete his theological studies. After his return, in 1743, he was appointed chaplain to the countess Teleki, and in 1749 he was called to Magyar-Igen as pastor of the Reformed Church, and died there in 1768.

In his native language he wrote, History of the Reformed Bishops of Transylvania (Nagy-Enyed, 1766); in Latin he published, Hungarorum quorumdam Principum ex Epitaphiis Renovata of Memoria (2 vols. 1764- 1766): — Historia Unitariorum in Transylvania (posthumous, Leyden, 1781).
