= Feneș (Ampoi) =

- Location within Romania

Location
- Country: Romania
- Counties: Alba County
- Villages: Feneș

Physical characteristics
- Mouth: Ampoi
  - location: Feneș
  - coordinates: 46.0948°N 23.3005°E
- Length: 19 km (12 mi)
- Basin size: 60 km^{2} (23 sq mi)

Basin features
- Progression: Ampoi→ Mureș→ Tisza→ Danube→ Black Sea

The Feneș is a left tributary of the river Ampoi in Romania. It discharges into the Ampoi in the village Feneș. Its length is 19 km (12 mi) and its basin size is 60 km^{2} (23 sq mi).
