= Căianu Mic =

- Commune
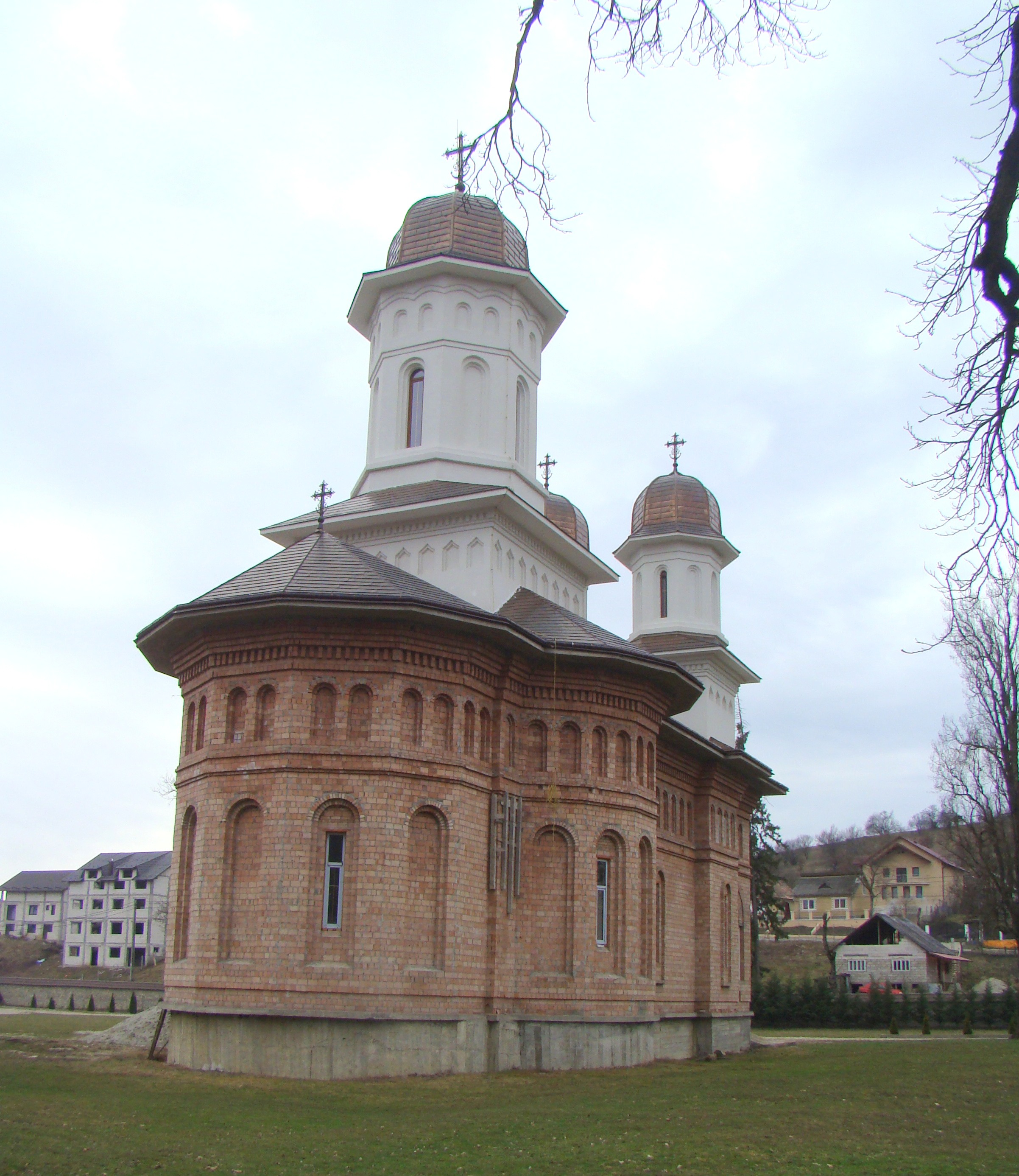
- Dobric Monastery

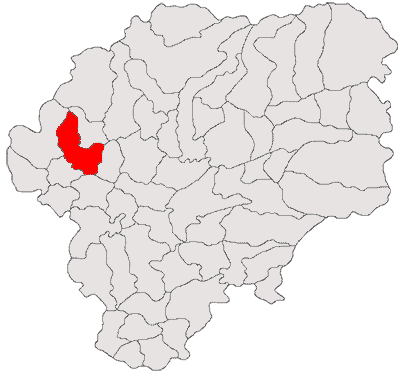
- Location of Căianu Mic in Bistrița-Năsăud County

- Location in Romania
- Coordinates: 47.25°N 24.1667°E
- Country: Romania
- County: Bistrița-Năsăud

Government
  - Mayor (2020–2024): Dumitru-Paul Știr (PSD)
- Area: 74.06 km^{2} (28.59 sq mi)
- Elevation: 283 m (928 ft)
- Population (2021-12-01): 4,112
  - Density: 55.52/km^{2} (143.8/sq mi)
- Time zone: UTC+02:00 (EET)
  - Summer (DST): UTC+03:00 (EEST)
- Postal code: 427025
- Area code: +40 x59
- Vehicle reg.: BN
- Website: www.primariacomuneicaianumic.ro

Căianu Mic (Hungarian: Kiskaján) is a commune in Bistrița-Năsăud County, Transylvania, Romania. It is composed of four villages: Căianu Mare (Nagykaján), Căianu Mic, Ciceu-Poieni (Csicsópolyán), and Dobric (Nagydebrek). It also included two other villages until 2004, when they were transferred to Spermezeu Commune.

The commune lies on the Transylvanian Plateau, on the banks of the river Ilișua and its affluent, Dumbrăvița. It is located in the western part of the county, close to the border with Cluj and Maramureș counties. It is situated at a distance of 20 km (12 mi) from Beclean, 29 km (18 mi) from Năsăud, and 51 km (32 mi) from the county seat, Bistrița.

== Sights ==
- Wooden church from Dobric
- Károly Castle from Dobric

== Natives ==
- Johannes Caioni (1629–1687), Franciscan friar, composer
- Ana Mirela Țermure (born 1975), javelin thrower
