= Tătulești =

- Commune
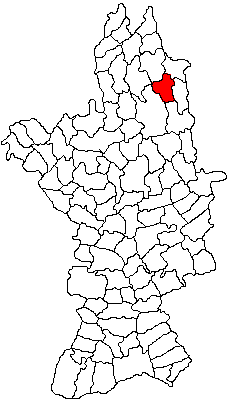
- Location in Olt County

- Location in Romania
- Coordinates: 44°38′N 24°38′E
- Country: Romania
- County: Olt
- Area: 44.94 km^{2} (17.35 sq mi)
- Population (2021-12-01): 986
  - Density: 21.9/km^{2} (56.8/sq mi)
- Time zone: UTC+02:00 (EET)
  - Summer (DST): UTC+03:00 (EEST)
- Vehicle reg.: OT

Tătulești is a commune in Olt County, Muntenia, Romania. It is composed of six villages: Bărbălăi, Lunca, Măgura, Mircești, Momaiu and Tătulești.
