= Luncșoara =

Luncșoara may refer to several places in Romania:

- Luncșoara, a village in Hălmăgel Commune, Arad County
- Luncșoara, a village in Aușeu Commune, Bihor County
- Luncșoara, a village in Vorța Commune, Hunedoara County
- Luncșoara, a village in Broșteni Commune, Mehedinți County
- Luncșoara (Hălmăgel), a river in Arad County
- Luncșoara, a tributary of the river Cozd in Brașov County

== See also ==
- Lunca (disambiguation)
- Luncile (disambiguation)
- Luncani (disambiguation)
- Luncavița (disambiguation)
