= Pârâul Alb (Timiș) =

- Location within Romania

Location
- Country: Romania
- Counties: Caraș-Severin County

Physical characteristics
- Mouth: Feneș
  - location: Feneș
  - coordinates: 45.1905°N 22.3542°E
- Length: 22 km (14 mi)
- Basin size: 62 km^{2} (24 sq mi)

Basin features
- Progression: Feneș→ Timiș→ Danube→ Black Sea
- Tributaries
  - left: Deavoia

The Pârâul Alb is a left tributary of the river Feneș in Romania. It discharges into the Feneș in the village Feneș. Its length is 22 km (14 mi) and its basin size is 62 km^{2} (24 sq mi).
