= Valea Lungă (Ilișua) =

- Location within Romania

Location
- Country: Romania
- Counties: Bistrița-Năsăud County
- Villages: Molișet, Agrieș, Târlișua

Physical characteristics
- Mouth: Ilișua
  - location: Târlișua
  - coordinates: 47.3821°N 24.1743°E
- Length: 17 km (11 mi)
- Basin size: 81 km^{2} (31 sq mi)

Basin features
- Progression: Ilișua→ Someșul Mare→ Someș→ Tisza→ Danube→ Black Sea
- Tributaries
  - right: Lunca

The Valea Lungă is a right tributary of the river Ilișua in Romania. It flows into the Ilișua in Târlișua. Its length is 17 km (11 mi) and its basin size is 81 km^{2} (31 sq mi).
