= Ampoi =

Ampoi Ompoly
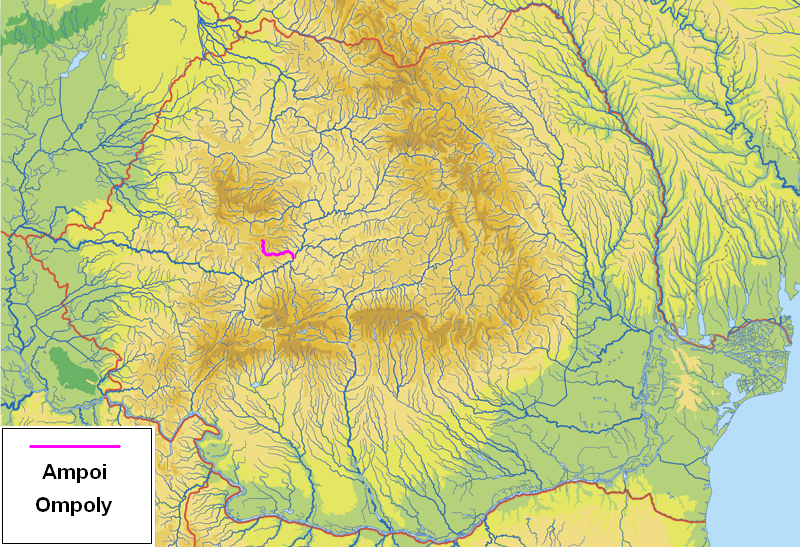

- Location within Romania

Location
- Country: Romania
- Counties: Alba County
- Villages: Izvoru Ampoiului, Zlatna, Feneș, Meteș, Șard

Physical characteristics
- Mouth: Mureș
  - location: near Alba Iulia
  - coordinates: 46.054°N 23.597°E

Basin features
- Progression: Mureș→ Tisza→ Danube→ Black Sea
- Tributaries
  - left: Vâltori, Feneș, Ampoița, Ighiu
  - right: Galați

The Ampoi (Hungarian: Ompoly) is a river in the Apuseni Mountains, Alba County, western Romania. It is a right tributary of the river Mureș. It flows through the town Zlatna, and joins the Mureș near Alba Iulia. Its length is 43 km (27 mi) and its basin size is 250 km^{2} (97 sq mi).

== Tributaries ==
The following rivers are tributaries to the Ampoi (from source to mouth):

- Left: Valea Petrei, Vâltori, Feneș, Valea lui Bibaț, Valea Albinei, Ampoița and Ighiu
- Right: Trâmpoiele, Valea Mare, Valea Mică and Galați
