= Luncavița =

Luncavița may refer to several places in Romania:

- Luncavița, Caraș-Severin, a commune in Caraș-Severin County
- Luncavița, Tulcea, a commune in Tulcea County
- Luncavița (Danube), a tributary of the Danube in Tulcea County
- Luncavița (Mehadica), a tributary of the Mehadica in Caraș-Severin County

== See also ==
- Lunca (disambiguation)
- Luncile (disambiguation)
- Luncani (disambiguation)
- Luncșoara (disambiguation)
