= Meteș =

- Commune
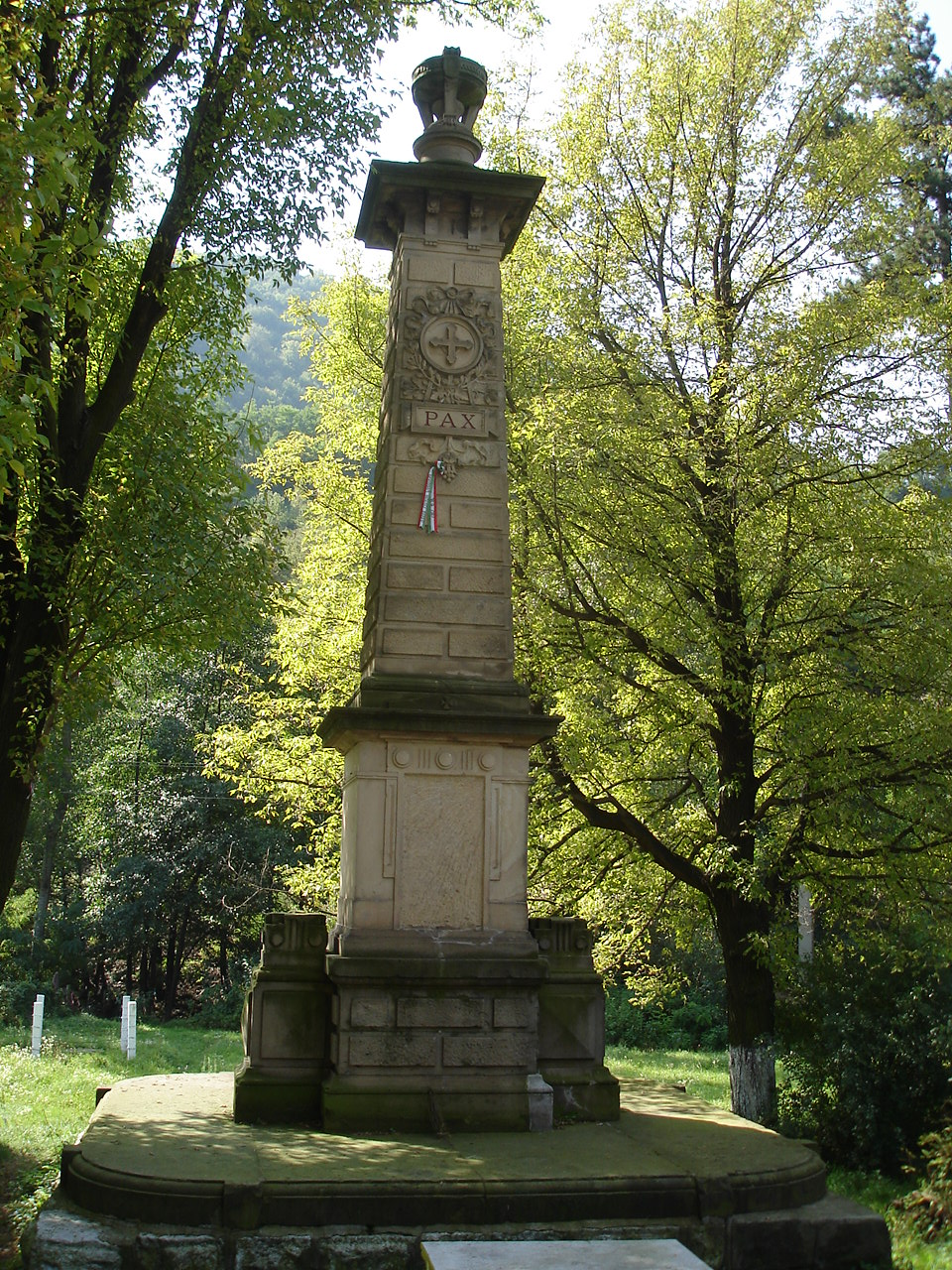
- Monument in Presaca Ampoiului

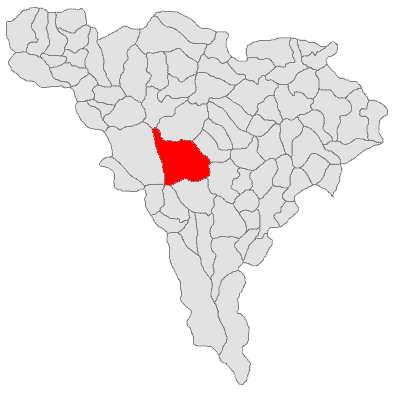
- Location in Alba County

- Location in Romania
- Coordinates: 46°05′49″N 23°25′17″E
- Country: Romania
- County: Alba

Government
  - Mayor (2021–2024): Daniel Sânzâiană (PNL)
- Area: 142.24 km^{2} (54.92 sq mi)
- Elevation: 317 m (1,040 ft)
- Population (2021-12-01): 2,564
  - Density: 18.03/km^{2} (46.69/sq mi)
- Time zone: UTC+02:00 (EET)
  - Summer (DST): UTC+03:00 (EEST)
- Postal code: 517445
- Area code: (+40) 02 58
- Vehicle reg.: AB
- Website: www.primariametes.ro

Meteș (German: Mettischdorf; Hungarian: Metesd) is a commune located in Alba County, Transylvania, Romania. It had a population of 2,564 as of 2021. It is composed of twelve villages: Ampoița, Isca, Lunca Ampoiței, Lunca Meteșului, Meteș, Pădurea, Poiana Ampoiului, Poiana Ursului, Presaca Ampoiului, Remetea, Tăuți, and Văleni.

In Romanian	In German	In Hungarian
Ampoița	Ampoifluß	Kisompoly
Isca		
Lunca Ampoiței		Lunkarész
Lunca Meteșului		Lunkatanya
Meteș	Mettischdorf	Metesd
Pădurea		
Poiana Ampoiului		Ompolymező
Poiana Ursului		
Presaca Ampoiului	Ober-Preßendorf	Ompolygyepű
Remetea		Ompolyremete
Tăuți		Tótfalud
Văleni		Ompolyszáda

The commune is located in the west-central part of the county, 18 km (11 mi) west of the county seat, Alba Iulia. It is crossed by national road DN74, which connects Alba Iulia to Zlatna, Abrud, and Brad further west. The train station in Poiana Ampoiului serves the 42 km (26 mi) long CFR Line 210, which runs from Alba Iulia to Zlatna.

Historical population
Year	Pop.	±%
2002	3,181	—
2011	2,860	−10.1%
2021	2,564	−10.3%
Source: INS, Census data
