= Albac (disambiguation) =

Albac may refer to the following places in Romania:

- Albac, a commune in Alba County
- Albac (Arieș), a tributary of the Arieșul Mare in Alba County
- Albac (Hârtibaciu), a tributary of the Hârtibaciu in Sibiu County
