= Albești, Constanța =

Albești
- Commune
- Coat of arms

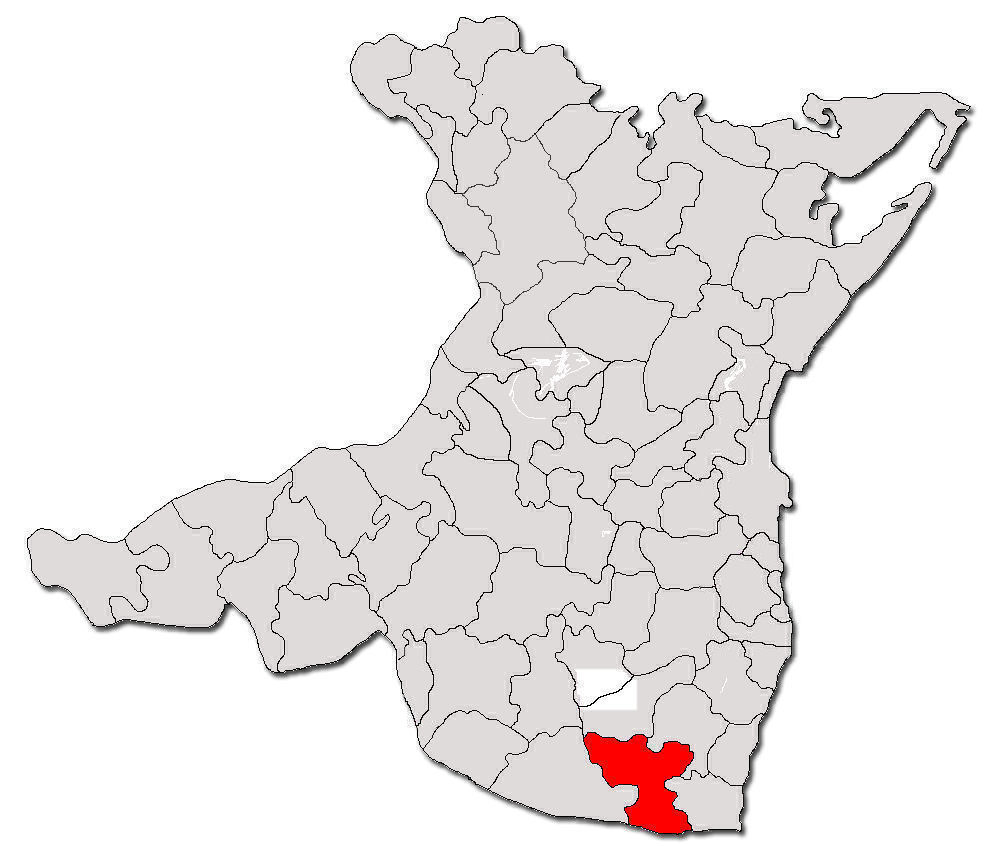
- Location in Constanța County

- Location in Romania
- Coordinates: 43°48′N 28°26′E
- Country: Romania
- County: Constanța
- Subdivisions: Albești, Arsa, Coroana, Cotu Văii, Vârtop

Government
  - Mayor (2020–2024): Gheorghe Moldovan (PNL)
- Area: 156.91 km^{2} (60.58 sq mi)
- Population (2021-12-01): 3,464
  - Density: 22.08/km^{2} (57.18/sq mi)
- Time zone: UTC+02:00 (EET)
  - Summer (DST): UTC+03:00 (EEST)
- Vehicle reg.: CT
- Website: https://comuna-albestict.ro

Albești (Romanian pronunciation: [alˈbeʃtʲ], meaning the "White (Village)" in Romanian) is a commune in Constanța County, Northern Dobruja, Romania.

The commune includes five villages:

- Albești (historical names: Turkish: Akbaş and Sarighiol)
- Arsa (historical name: Capucci)
- Coroana (historical names: Cadichioi, Turkish: Kadıköy)
- Cotu Văii (historical names: Chiragi or Ciragi, Turkish: Kiracı)
- Vârtop (historical name: Deliorucci)

== Demographics ==
At the 2011 census, Albești had 3,154 Romanians (97.05%), 3 Hungarians (0.09%), 4 Roma (0.12%), 5 Turks (0.15%), 80 Tatars (2.46%), 4 others (0.12%).
