= Târlișua =

- Commune
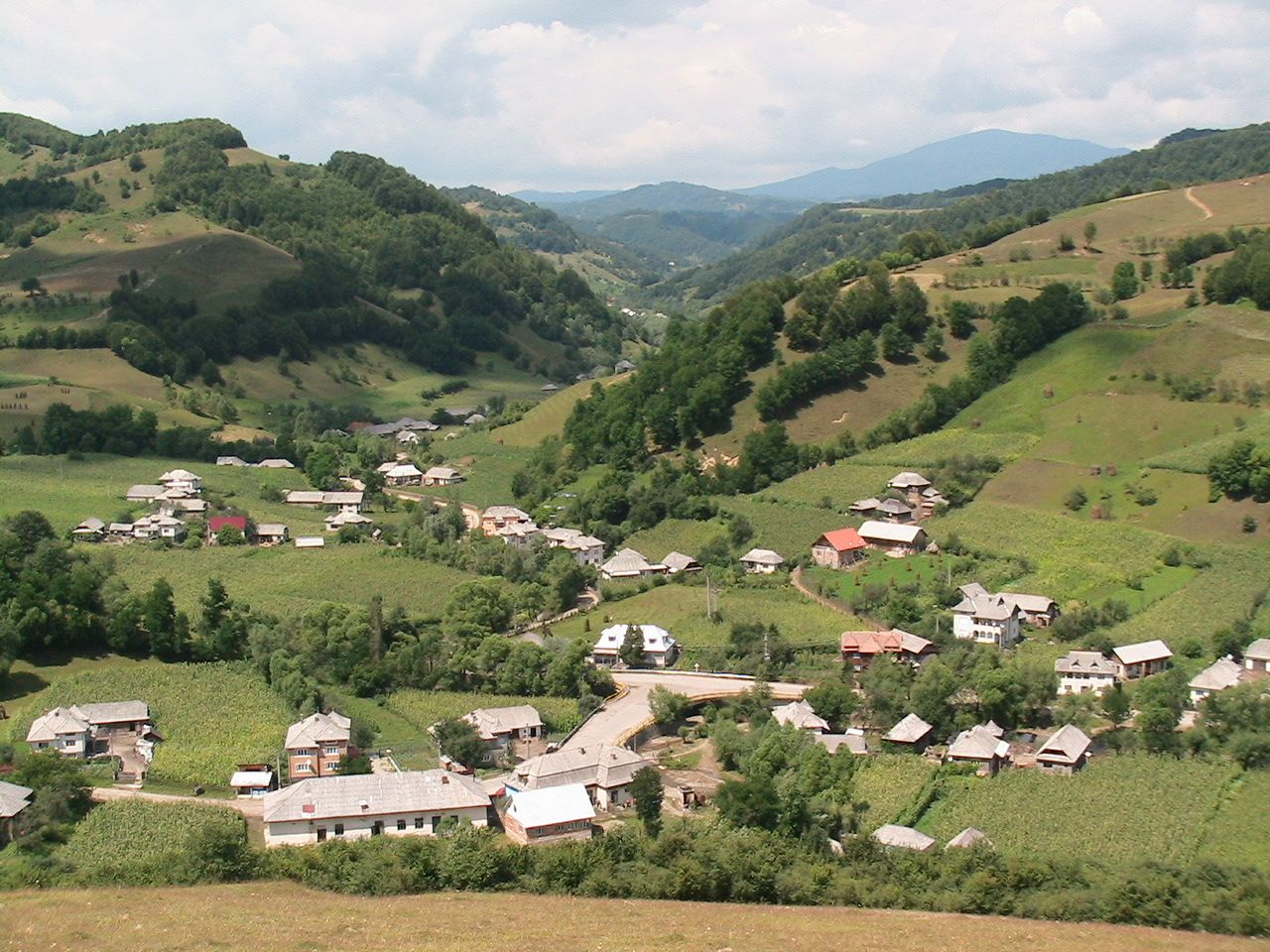
- View of Agrieș village

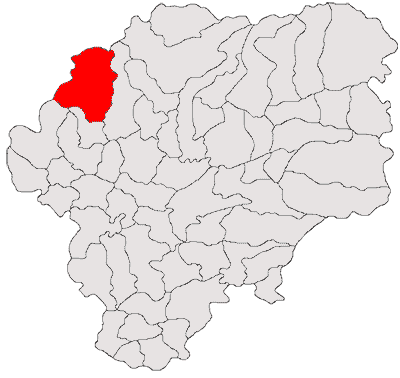
- Location in Bistrița-Năsăud County

- Location in Romania
- Coordinates: 47°23′N 24°11′E
- Country: Romania
- County: Bistrița-Năsăud

Government
  - Mayor (2020–2024): Vlăduț Axente Purja (PSD)
- Area: 160.83 km^{2} (62.10 sq mi)
- Elevation: 368 m (1,207 ft)
- Population (2021-12-01): 2,892
  - Density: 17.98/km^{2} (46.57/sq mi)
- Time zone: UTC+02:00 (EET)
  - Summer (DST): UTC+03:00 (EEST)
- Postal code: 427330
- Vehicle reg.: BN
- Website: primariatarlisua.ro

Târlișua (Hungarian: Felsőilosva) is a commune in Bistrița-Năsăud County, Transylvania, Romania.

It is composed of ten villages: Agrieș (Felsőpusztaegres or Egreshely), Agrieșel (Alsóegres or Egrespuszta), Borleasa (Lonkafalva), Cireași, Lunca Sătească, Molișet (Molisetitanya), Oarzina (Úrivölgy), Răcăteșu (Rakatyestanya), Șendroaia (Sándorvölgy, formerly Sendrojatanya), and Târlișua.

The commune is located in the northwestern part of the county, on the border with Maramureș County. It lies on the banks of the river Ilișua and its affluent, Valea Lungă.

Târlișua is situated at a distance of 41 km (25 mi) from the town of Năsăud and 69 km (43 mi) from the county seat, Bistrița.

== Sights ==
- Wooden church from Borleasa
- Wooden church from Târlișua

== Natives ==
- Grigore Man (1941–2012), teacher and writer
- Alexandru Nicula (1913–2015), Greek Catholic priest
- Liviu Rebreanu (1885–1944), novelist
