= Uriu =

Uriu Felőr
- Commune
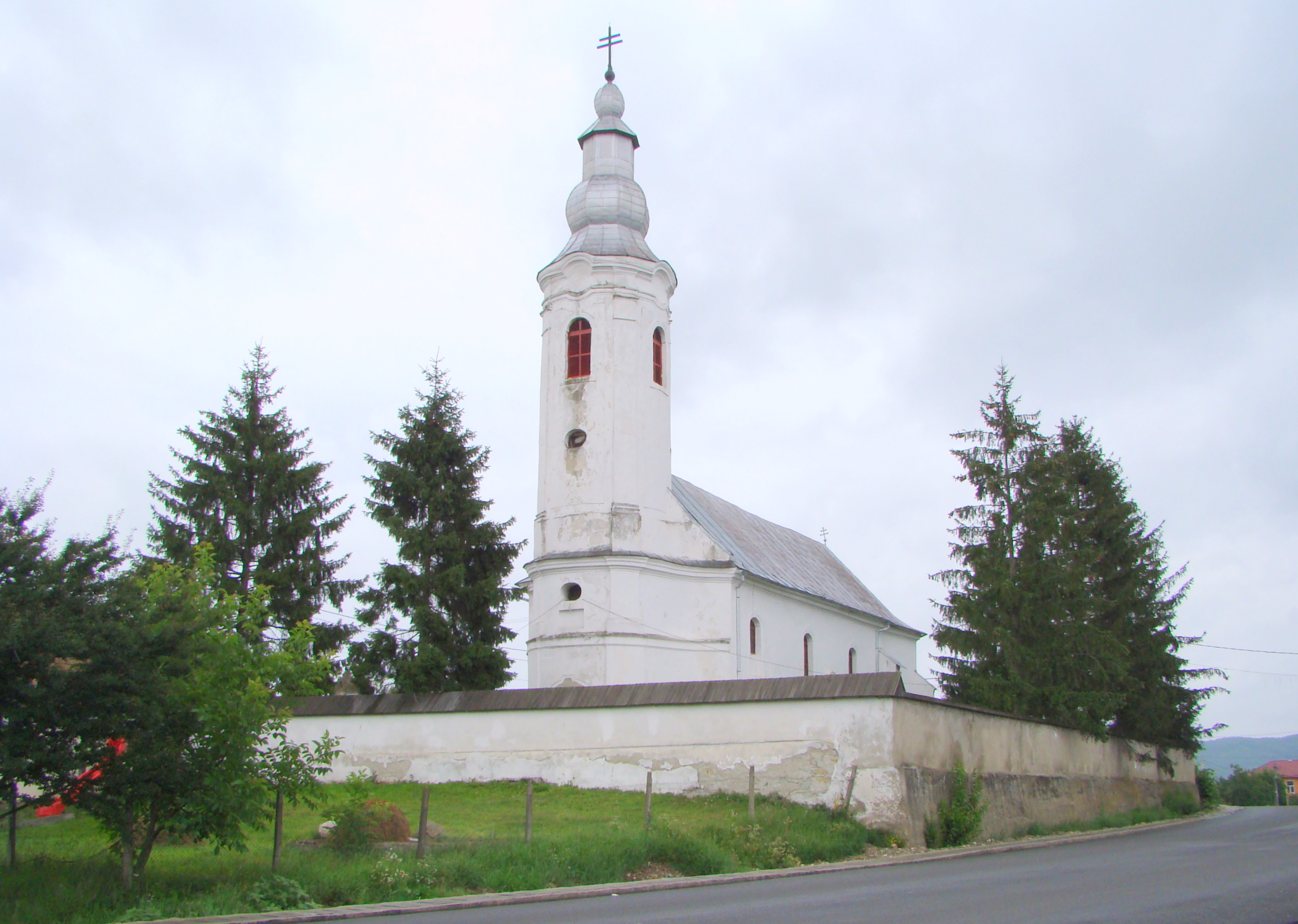
- Roman Catholic Church in Cristeștii Ciceului

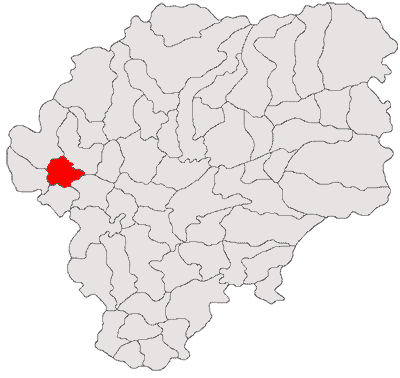
- Location in Bistrița-Năsăud County

- Location in Romania
- Coordinates: 47.2°N 24.05°E
- Country: Romania
- County: Bistrița-Năsăud

Government
  - Mayor (2020–2024): Radu-Gheorghe Spermezan
- Area: 48.30 km^{2} (18.65 sq mi)
- Elevation: 257 m (843 ft)
- Population (2021-12-01): 3,414
  - Density: 70.68/km^{2} (183.1/sq mi)
- Time zone: UTC+02:00 (EET)
  - Summer (DST): UTC+03:00 (EEST)
- Postal code: 427365
- Vehicle reg.: BN
- Website: www.primariauriu.ro

Uriu (Hungarian: Felőr; German: Steinfeld or Er) is a commune in Bistrița-Năsăud County, Transylvania, Romania. It is composed of four villages: Cristeștii Ciceului (Hungarian: Csicsókeresztúr), Hășmașu Ciceului (Hungarian: Csicsóhagymás), Ilișua (Hungarian: Alsóilosva; German: Illischau), and Uriu.

== History ==
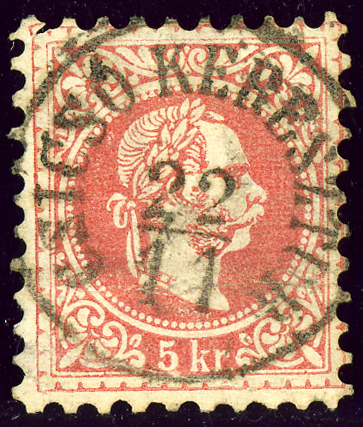
Austrian stamp cancelled in the Kingdom of Hungary after 1867

== Natives ==
- Zsófia Torma
