= Armeniș =

- Commune
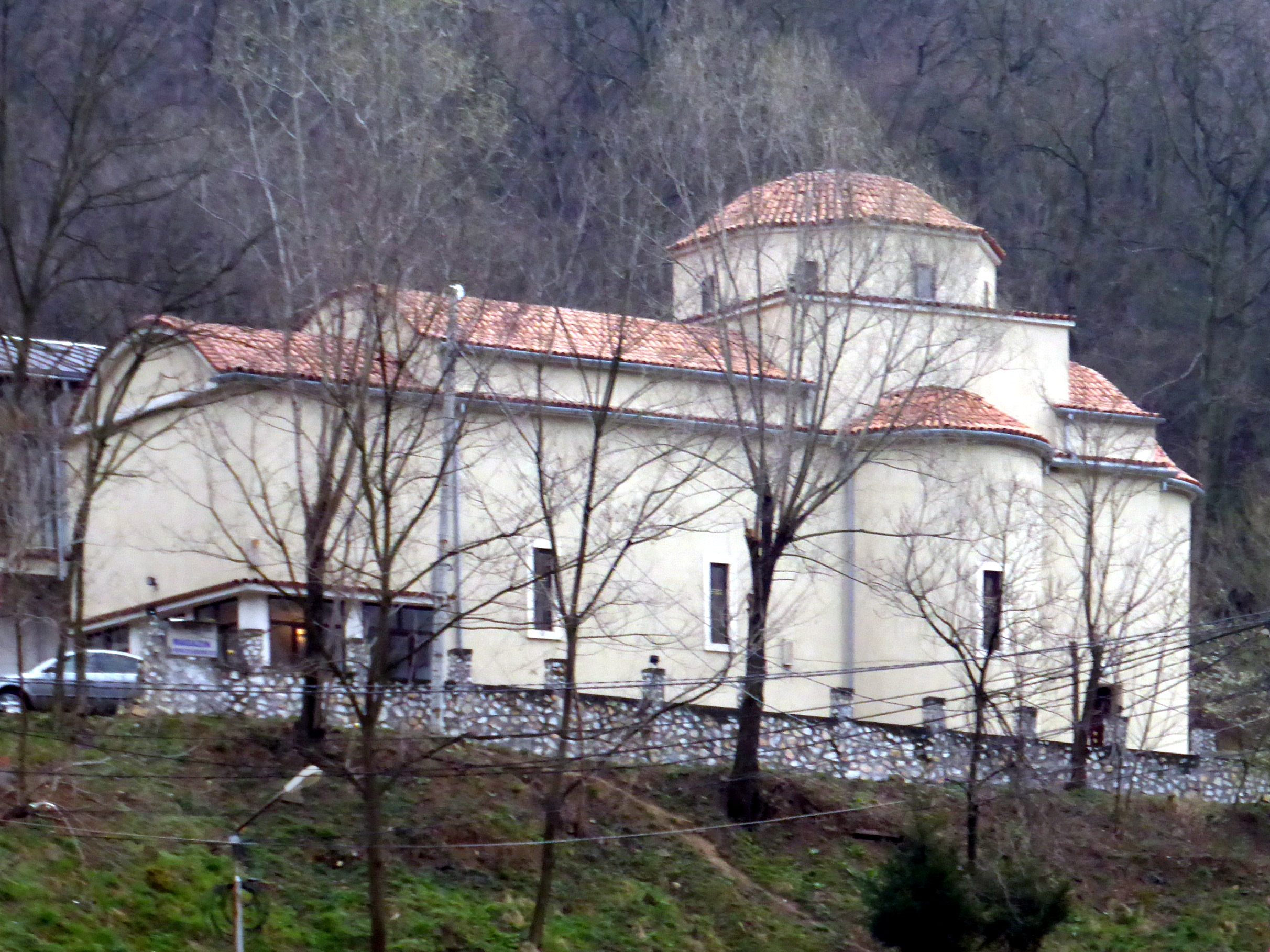
- Piatra Scrisă Monastery

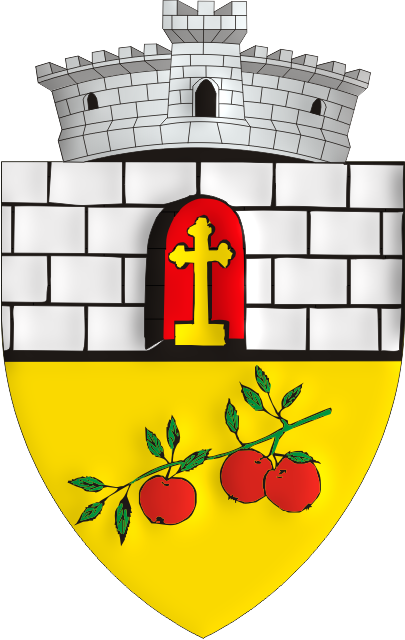
- Coat of arms

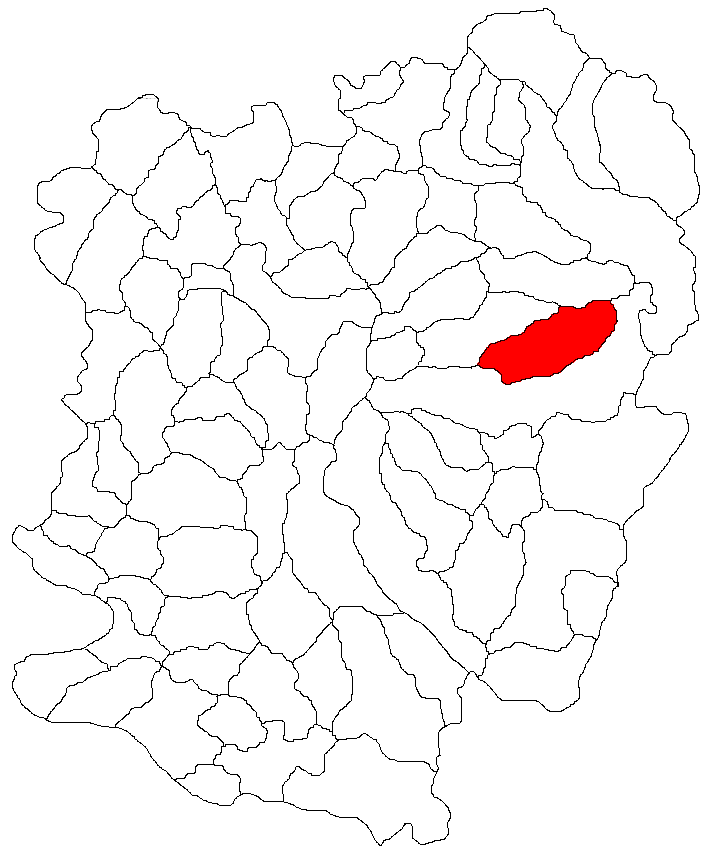
- Location in Caraș-Severin County

- Location in Romania
- Coordinates: 45°12′N 22°19′E
- Country: Romania
- County: Caraș-Severin

Government
  - Mayor (2024–2028): Ioan-Cristian Vela (PNL)
- Area: 143.37 km^{2} (55.36 sq mi)
- Elevation: 343 m (1,125 ft)
- Population (2021-12-01): 2,057
  - Density: 14.35/km^{2} (37.16/sq mi)
- Time zone: UTC+02:00 (EET)
  - Summer (DST): UTC+03:00 (EEST)
- Postal code: 327005
- Area code: +(40) 02 55
- Vehicle reg.: CS
- Website: primaria-armenis.ro

Armeniș (Hungarian: Örményes) is a commune in Caraș-Severin County, western Romania with a population of 2,057 as of 2021. It is composed of five villages: Armeniș, Feneș (Fényes), Plopu, Sat Bătrân (Ófalu), and Sub Margine.

Historical population
Year	Pop.	±%
1880	3,042	—
1910	4,053	+33.2%
1930	4,007	−1.1%
1977	3,413	−14.8%
2002	2,718	−20.4%
2011	2,454	−9.7%
2021	2,057	−16.2%
Source: Census data
