= Ighiu =

- Commune
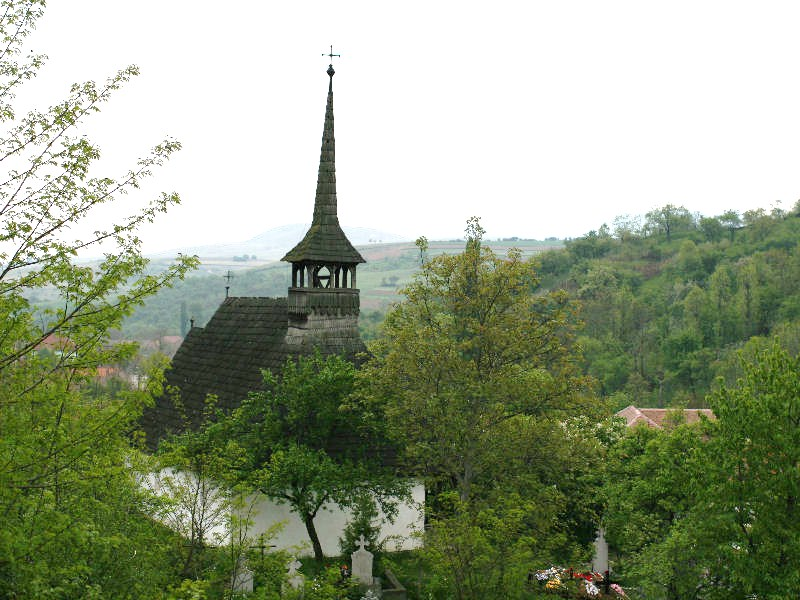
- Wooden church in Ighiel

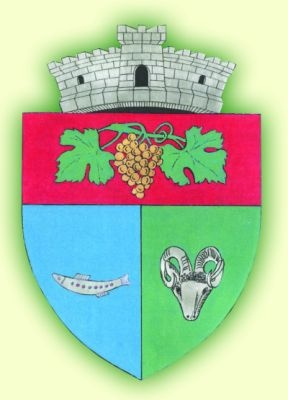
- Coat of arms

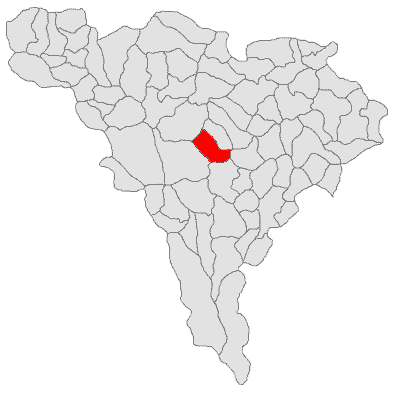
- Location in Alba County

- Location in Romania
- Coordinates: 46°08′40″N 23°30′56″E
- Country: Romania
- County: Alba

Government
  - Mayor (2020–2024): Traian Rusu (PNL)
- Area: 128.49 km^{2} (49.61 sq mi)
- Elevation: 281 m (922 ft)
- Population (2021-12-01): 6,543
  - Density: 50.92/km^{2} (131.9/sq mi)
- Time zone: UTC+02:00 (EET)
  - Summer (DST): UTC+03:00 (EEST)
- Postal code: 517360
- Area code: (+40) 02 58
- Vehicle reg.: AB
- Website: comunaighiu.ro

Ighiu (Hungarian: Magyarigen; German: Grabendorf) is a commune located in Alba County, Transylvania, Romania. The commune is composed of five villages: Bucerdea Vinoasă (Borosbocsárd), Ighiel (Igenpataka), Ighiu, Șard (Sárd), and Țelna (Celna).

The commune is located in the southeastern corner of the Transylvanian Plateau, about 10 km (6.2 mi) northwest of Alba Iulia and 17 km (11 mi) southwest of Teiuș. The Ighiu river passes through Ighiel and Ighiu villages before discharging into the Ampoi river in Șard.

Both Șard and Ighiu have fortified churches. The latter one, the Reformed Church of Ighiu, is part of an architectural ensemble dating back to the 15th century, with the present church having been built in 1781–1783. The Hungarian theologian and historian Péter Bod was pastor there from 1749 to his death, in 1768; his tomb is in the church's courtyard.

== Natives ==
- Ádám Récsey (1775–1852), Hungarian general

== See also ==
- Castra of Ighiu
