= Spermezeu =

- Commune
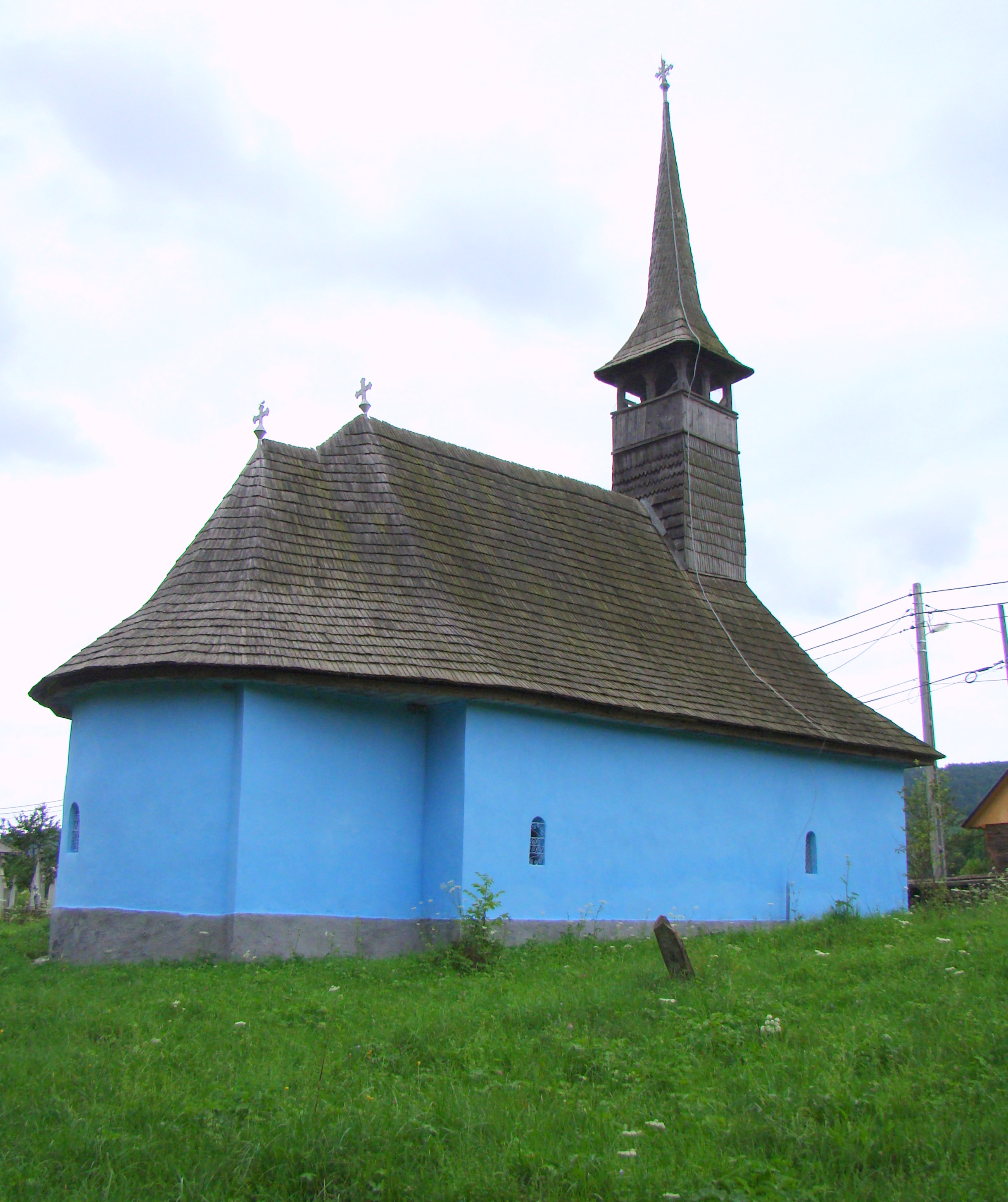
- Wooden church in Spermezeu

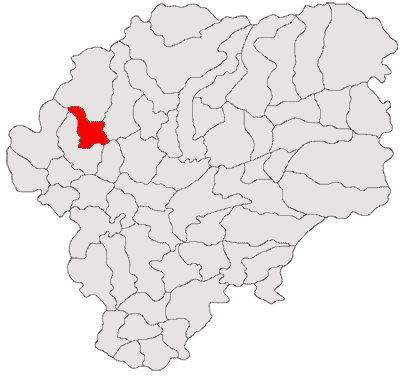
- Location in Bistrița-Năsăud County

- Location in Romania
- Coordinates: 47°18′N 24°9′E
- Country: Romania
- County: Bistrița-Năsăud

Government
  - Mayor (2020–2024): Sorin Hognogi (PNL)
- Area: 69.64 km^{2} (26.89 sq mi)
- Elevation: 342 m (1,122 ft)
- Population (2021-12-01): 3,445
  - Density: 49.47/km^{2} (128.1/sq mi)
- Time zone: UTC+02:00 (EET)
  - Summer (DST): UTC+03:00 (EEST)
- Postal code: 427275
- Area code: +40 x59
- Vehicle reg.: BN
- Website: comunaspermezeu.ro

Spermezeu (Hungarian: Ispánmező) is a commune in Bistrița-Năsăud County, Transylvania, Romania. It is composed of eight villages: Dobricel (Kisdebrek), Dumbrăvița (Dögmező), Hălmăsău (Helmesaljavölgy), Lunca Borlesei, Păltineasa (Jávorvölgy), Sita (Szita), Spermezeu, and Șesuri Spermezeu-Vale (Síktelep). Dobricel and Dumbrăvița were part of Căianu Mic Commune until 2004.

The commune is situated in a hilly area at the northern edge of the Transylvanian Plateau, on the banks of the river Ilișua. It is located in the western part of Bistrița-Năsăud County, about 21 km (13 mi) from the town of Beclean and 46 km (29 mi) from the county seat, Bistrița.
