= Luncani =

Luncani or Luncanii may refer to:

- Several villages in Romania:
  - Luncani, a village in Mărgineni Commune, Bacău County
  - Luncani, a village in Luna Commune, Cluj County
  - Luncani, a village in the city of Toplița, Harghita County
  - Luncani, a village in Boșorod Commune, Hunedoara County
  - Luncanii de Jos and Luncanii de Sus, villages in Tomești Commune, Timiș County
- Valea Luncanilor, a river in Hunedoara County, Romania
