= Zlatna =

- Town
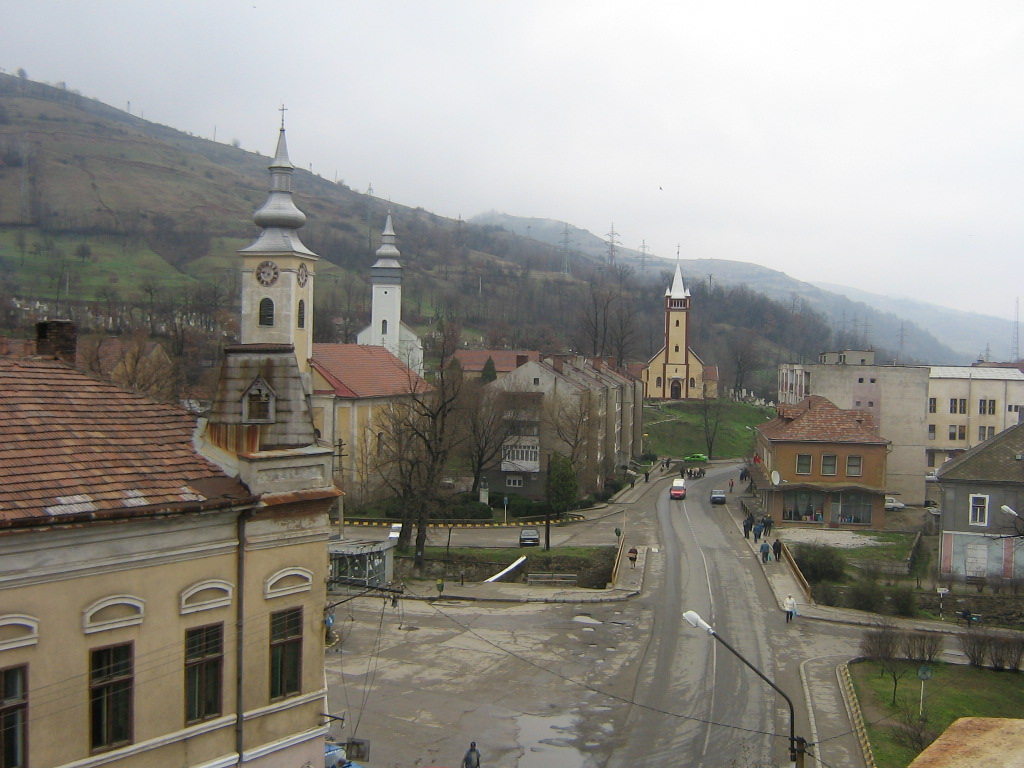

- Coat of arms

- Location in Alba County

- Location in Romania
- Coordinates: 46°09′32″N 23°13′16″E
- Country: Romania
- County: Alba

Government
  - Mayor (2024–2028): Silviu Ponoran (PNL)
- Area: 254.26 km^{2} (98.17 sq mi)
- Elevation: 425 m (1,394 ft)
- Population (2021-12-01): 6,652
  - Density: 26.16/km^{2} (67.76/sq mi)
- Time zone: UTC+02:00 (EET)
  - Summer (DST): UTC+03:00 (EEST)
- Postal code: 516100
- Area code: (+40) 02 58
- Vehicle reg.: AB
- Website: www.primaria-zlatna.ro

Zlatna (German: Klein-Schlatten, Kleinschlatten, Goldenmarkt; Hungarian: Zalatna; Latin: Ampellum) is a town in Alba County, central Transylvania, Romania. The town administers eighteen villages: Botești (Golddorf; Botesbánya), Budeni (Higendorf), Dealu Roatei (Rotberg), Dobrot, Dumbrava, Feneș (Wildendorf; Fenes), Galați (Galz; Ompolygalac), Izvoru Ampoiului (Gross-Ompeil; Nagyompoly), Pârău Gruiului (Gruybach), Pătrângeni (Peters; Ompolykövesd ), Pirita (Pfirth), Podu lui Paul (Pauls), Runc (Goldrücken), Ruși (Rusch), Suseni (Oberdorf), Trâmpoiele (Trempojel; Kénesd), Valea Mică (Kleinwasser), and Vâltori (Waldrücken; Vultur).

== Geography ==
Zlatna is located 36 km (22 mi) north-west of the county seat, Alba Iulia, on the border with Hunedoara County. Situated in the Zlatna depression, between the Metaliferi Mountains and the Trascău Mountains, the town lies at the confluence of the Ampoi River with Valea Morilor creek.

== History ==
A gold mining settlement has existed in the area since Roman times, when it was known as a municipium under the name of Ampellum. The name Zlatna (derived from the Slavic term for gold) was first recorded in a 1347 document. In 1387, it was awarded town status. During 1619-1620 Gabriel Bethlen, brought to Zlatna a few hundred German and Slovak settlers for mining work. Tellurium was first discovered in a Zlatna mine in 1782 by Austrian mineralogist Franz-Joseph Müller von Reichenstein. Zlatna regained its town status in 1968, after a time when it was officially a commune.

== Demographics ==
Historical population
Year	Pop.	±%
1850	8,141	—
1941	9,485	+16.5%
1977	10,027	+5.7%
1992	9,391	−6.3%
2002	9,254	−1.5%
2011	7,182	−22.4%
2021	6,652	−7.4%
Source: Census data

At the 2011 census, Zlatna had 7,182 inhabitants; 89.59% of those were Romanians and 4.59% Roma. At the 2021 census, the town had a population of 6,652, of which 85.6% were Romanians and 5.11% Roma.

== Natives ==
- Cornelia Emilian (1840–1910), journalist and women's rights activist
- László Lukács (1850–1932), Hungarian politician
- Andrei Mărginean (born 2001), footballer
- Horea Popescu (1926–2010), film and theater director
- Virgil Popescu (1916–1989), footballer

== Climate ==
Zlatna has a humid continental climate (Cfb in the Köppen climate classification).

Climate data for Zlatna
Month	Jan	Feb	Mar	Apr	May	Jun	Jul	Aug	Sep	Oct	Nov	Dec	Year
Mean daily maximum °C (°F)	1 (34)	3 (37)	7.3 (45.1)	13.2 (55.8)	17.4 (63.3)	20.7 (69.3)	22.6 (72.7)	23 (73)	18 (64)	13.1 (55.6)	7.9 (46.2)	2.3 (36.1)	12.5 (54.3)
Daily mean °C (°F)	−2.6 (27.3)	−1 (30)	2.8 (37.0)	8.2 (46.8)	12.9 (55.2)	16.3 (61.3)	18.2 (64.8)	18.3 (64.9)	13.6 (56.5)	8.7 (47.7)	3.9 (39.0)	−0.9 (30.4)	8.2 (46.7)
Mean daily minimum °C (°F)	−5.8 (21.6)	−4.7 (23.5)	−1.6 (29.1)	3 (37)	7.7 (45.9)	11.4 (52.5)	13.2 (55.8)	13.5 (56.3)	9.4 (48.9)	4.7 (40.5)	0.7 (33.3)	−3.7 (25.3)	4.0 (39.1)
Average precipitation mm (inches)	45 (1.8)	43 (1.7)	56 (2.2)	72 (2.8)	83 (3.3)	96 (3.8)	88 (3.5)	67 (2.6)	64 (2.5)	54 (2.1)	46 (1.8)	53 (2.1)	767 (30.2)
Source: https://en.climate-data.org/europe/romania/alba/zlatna-44399/

== Points of interest ==
- A 220 metres (720 feet) high chimney, interconnected with a smoke duct with a copper smelter (not in use any more) in the town.
