= List of tributaries of the Danube =

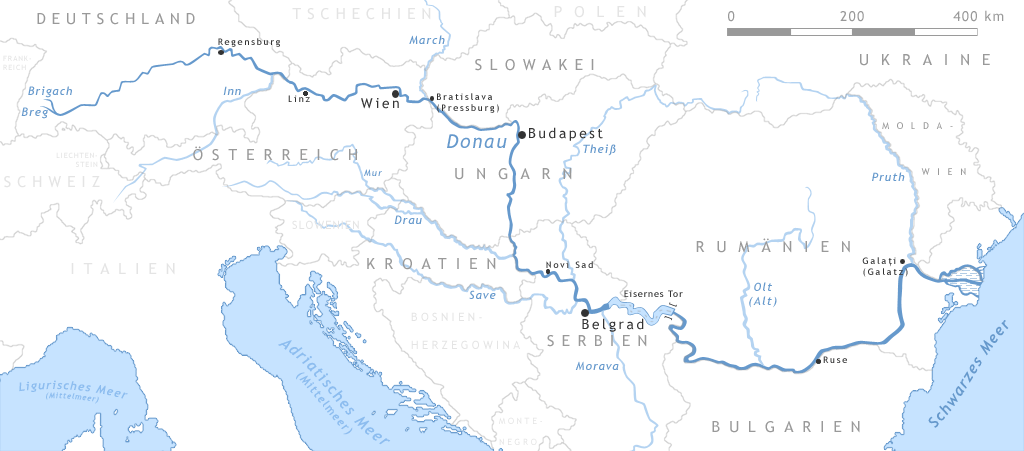
Map of most important tributaries of the Danube, the watersheds of which (and those not illustrated) form the river's drainage basin

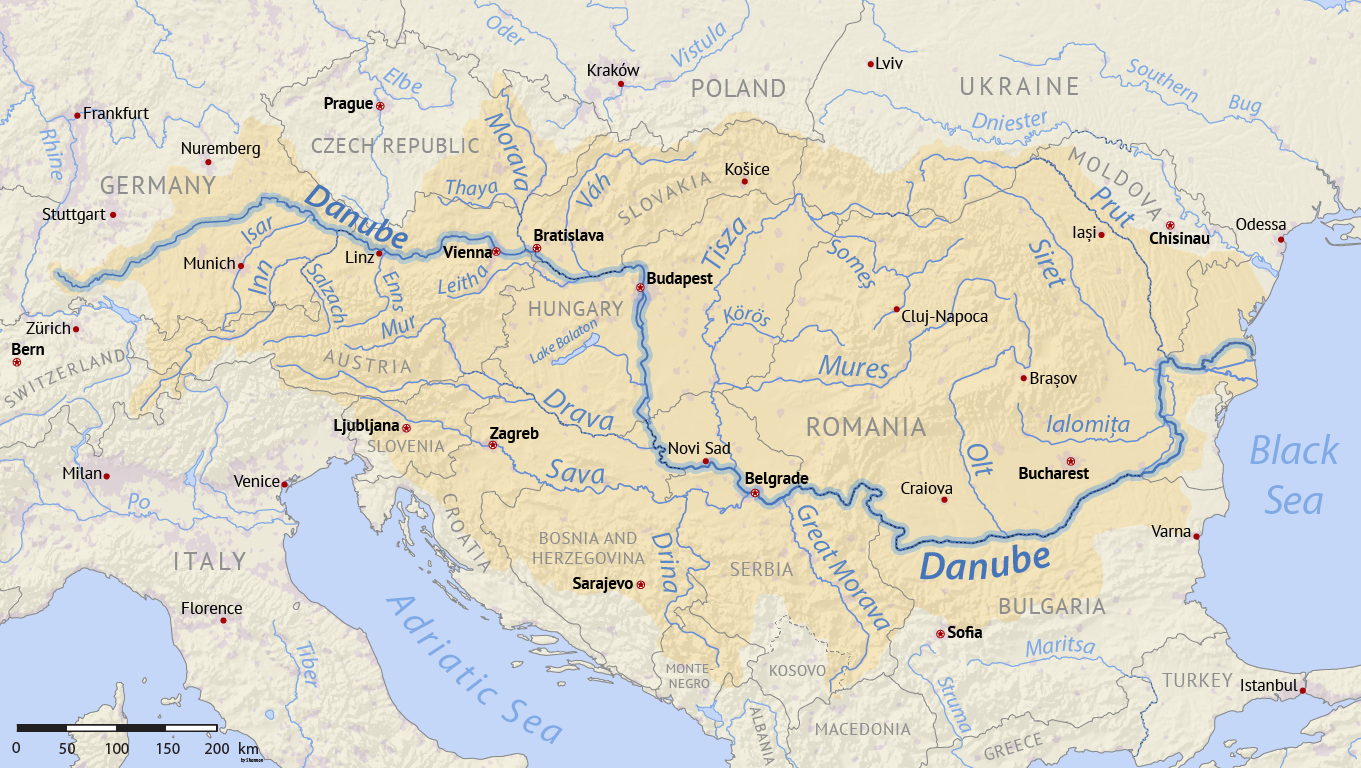
The Danube River Basin is the catchment area of the river.

This is a list of tributaries of the Danube by order of entrance.

The Danube is Europe's second-longest river, with a length of 2,850 kilometres (1,770 mi), and a drainage basin of 801,463 square kilometres (309,447 sq mi). It starts in the Black Forest in Germany as two smaller rivers—the Brigach and the Breg—which join at Donaueschingen, after which it is known as the Danube.

From there it flows generally eastwards through—or forming a part of the borders of—Austria, Slovakia, Hungary, Croatia, Serbia, Bulgaria, Romania, Moldova, and Ukraine, before emptying into the Black Sea via the Danube Delta in Romania. Its drainage basin includes parts of nine more countries: Poland, Switzerland, Italy, Czech Republic, Slovenia, Bosnia and Herzegovina, Montenegro, North Macedonia and Albania.

River	Entering the Danube at	Distance from mouth (Sulina) (km)	Side of the entrance	Length (km)
Breg (right main headwater)	Donaueschingen	2810	right	46
Brigach (left main headwater)	Donaueschingen	2810	left	43
Lauchert	Sigmaringendorf		left	56
Riss	Rißtissen		right	50
Rot	Dellmensingen		right	54
Iller	Ulm		right	147
Roth	Oberfahlheim		right	55
Günz	Günzburg		right	55
Mindel	Gundremmingen		right	78
Brenz	Lauingen		left	55
Wörnitz	Donauwörth	2509	left	132
Zusam	Donauwörth	2508	right	97
Schmutter	Donauwörth	2508	right	96
Lech	Marxheim (near Donauwörth)		right	264
Friedberger Ach	Unterhausen		right	100
Paar	near Vohburg	2443	right	134
Abens	near Neustadt (Donau)		right	53
Altmühl	Kelheim	2414.68	left	23
Hopfenbach	Kelheim	2410.67	right	
Schwarze Laber	Sinzing	2387.9	left	77
Naab	Regensburg	2385.3	left	165
Regen	Regensburg	2379.24	left	165
Sulzbach	Donaustauf	2367.5	left	
Otterbach	Donaustauf	2367.6	left	22.5
Pfatter	Pfatter	2349.31	right	33
Wiesent	Niederachdorf	2346.43	left	25
Große Laber	near Straubing	2329.51	right	74
Aiterach	Straubing		right	39
Kinsach	Bogen	2309	left	38.5
Isar	near Deggendorf	2281.71	right	286
Hengersberger Ohe	Winzer	2264.21	left	34
Vils	Vilshofen	2248.63	right	69
Gaißa	Passau-Schalding	2233.85	left	
Ilz	Passau	2225.43	left	37
Inn	Passau	2225.2	right	517
Satzbach	Thyrnau	2221.3	left	
Kößlbach	Freinberg	2218.0	right	
Erlau	Erlau	2215.15	left	
Dandlbach	Neustift im Mühlkreis	2201.77	left	
Ranna	Niederranna	2196.04	left	
Kleiner Kösslbach	Niederranna	2194.55	right	
Kleine Mühl	Kirchberg ob der Donau	2177.85	left	36
Große Mühl	Untermühl	2168.0	left	70
Innbach	Wilhering		right	53
Rodl	Ottensheim	2144.83	left	
Bleicherbach	Ottensheim	2143.35	left	
Traun	near Linz	2124.73	right	153
Ipfbach	Asten	2116.98	right	
Gusen	Mauthausen	2113.6	left	
Enns	Mauthausen	2111.828	right	254
Aist	Naarn im Machlande	2108.5	left	
Ysper	Isperdorf	2065.7	right	
Ybbs	Ybbs an der Donau	2057.1	right	13
Erlauf	Pöchlarn	2046.3	left	70
Melk	Melk		right	
Pielach	Melk	2034.35	right	70
Aggsbach	Aggsbach	2027.17	right	
Endlingbach	Aggsbach	2026.97	left	
Spitzer Bach	Spitz	2019.58	left	
Fladnitzbach	Palt	2000.6	right	
Krems	Altenwörth		left	65
Traisen	Altenwörth	1979.1	right	
Kamp	Altenwörth		left	168
Perschling	Zwentendorf	1972.1	right	
Große Tulln	Tulln an der Donau	1965.27	right	
Schmida	Korneuburg		left	74
Wien	Vienna		right	
Schwechat	Upstream of Schönau	1913.7	right	
Fischa	Fischamend		right	
Rußbach	near Hainburg an der Donau	1881.2	left	71
Morava	Devín	1880.26	left	358
Vydrica	Bratislava	1871.5	left	
Leitha	near Mosonmagyaróvár	1793.0	right	18
Rába	Győr	1793.0	right	322
Concó	Ács	1777.0	right	
Váh	Komárno	1765.8	left	403
Hron	near Štúrovo	1716.0	left	298
Ipeľ	near Szob	1708.2	left	232
Lepence	Visegrád	1697.0	right	
Benta	Százhalombatta	1621.75	right	
Sió	near Szekszárd	1497.15	right	121 (360)
Drava	near Osijek	1382.5	right	725
Vuka	Vukovar	1333.1	right	114
Tisza	near Titel	1214.5	left	965
Sava	Belgrade	1170	right	990
Timiș	Pančevo	1154.2	left	359
Jezava	Smederevo	1115.2	right	
Velika Morava	near Smederevo	1104.5	right	185 (493, 550)
Mlava	near Kostolac	1091.6	right	158
Karaš	near Banatska Palanka	1076.5	left	110
Nera	near Banatska Palanka	1075.0	left	143
Belobreșca			left	8
Șușca			left	7
Pek	Veliko Gradište	1057.1	right	129
Radimna			left	27
Pojejena			left	9
Pârva	Upstream of Moldova Veche	1050.9	left	8
Boșneag	Moldova Veche	1045.3	left	12
Tumanska reka	Usije		right	
Liborajdea	Liborajdea	1031.9	left	8
Čezava	near Dobra	1026.8	right	
Camenița	Gornea	1025.7	left	14
Orevița	Liubcova	1022.9	left	25
Dobranska reka	Dobra	1021.0	right	
Berzasca	Berzasca	1017.8	left	46
Kožica	near Dobra		right	
Sirina	Downstream of Cozla	1012.1	left	22
Pesača		1009.4	right	
Poloseva (Eliseva)		1007.3	left	8
Boljetinska reka		1003.2	right	
Strenica			left	7
Zlatica		992.8	right	
Porečka	Donji Milanovac	988.2	right	5
Lut		988	left	8
Tișovița	near Eibenthal	982.6	left	16
Hlubotina		979.7	left	8
Plavișevița		976.2	left	9
Valea Morilor			left	11
Valea Satului	Dubova		left	7
Mraconia	near Dubova	967.0	left	19
Valea Satului	Upstream of Eșelnița		left	7
Mala	Upstream of Eșelnița	961.4	left	12
Eșelnița	Eșelnița	959.7	left	26
Cerna	Orșova	953.2	left	79
Bahna	near Ilovița	949.8	left	35
Dževrin	Novi Sip	949.2	right	
Vodița	near Ilovița		left	9
Kašajna	Davidovac	946.8	right	
Jidoștița	Gura Văii		left	19
Kladušnica	Kladušnica	936.8	right	
Topolnița	Drobeta-Turnu Severin	927.8	left	44
Băran	near Bistrița		left	6
Vratna	Slatina	879	right	
Blahnița	Balta Verde		left	56
Timok	Bulgarian-Serbian border	845.65	right	203
Drincea	Cetate		left	79
Topolovets	near Vidin	784.1	right	68
Voynishka reka	Dunavtsi	782.2	right	55
Vidbol	Dunavtsi	780.2	right	62
Archar	Archar	768.5	right	59
Skomlya	near Dobri dol	762.5	right	42
Lom	Lom	741.7	right	93
Balasan	near Catane		left	51
Desnățui	Bistreț		left	115
Tsibritsa	Dolni Tsibar	715.85	right	91
Jiu	near Bechet	691.55	left	339
Ogosta	between the Jiu's mouth and Oryahovo	684.5	right	143
Jieț	Bechet	681	left	52
Iskar	Gigen	637.0	right	368
Ursa	Gârcov		left	11
Vit	Somovit	609.5	right	188
Olt	Turnu Măgurele	604.0	left	615
Sâi	Turnu Măgurele	600.6	left	85
Osam	Nikopol, Bulgaria	600.1	right	314
Călmățui	Suhaia		left	139
Pasărea	Zimnicea		left	19
Barata	Svishtov	555	right	39
Vedea	Bujoru		left	224
Yantra	Svishtov	536.7	right	285
Parapanca	Slobozia		left	29
Rusenski Lom	Ruse	497.8	right	45 (196.9)
Oncești	near Gostinu		left	9
Topchiyska reka	Mishka Island	458	right	89
Tsaratsar	west of Tutrakan	435	right	108
Zboiul	near Oltenița		left	28
Argeș	Oltenița, Romania	430.0	left	350
Senkovets	Garvan Island	405	right	102
Mostiștea	Dorobanțu		left	98
Berza	Bogata		left	26
Almălău	Galița		right	20
Canlia	Canlia		right	8
Suha reka	Lake Oltina		right	126
Canaraua Fetei	Oltina		right	16
Jegălia	Jegălia		left	
Valea Mare	Dunăreni		right	29
Urluia	Rasova		right	98
Valea Rasovei	Rasova		right	
Peștera	Cochirleni		right	26
Țibrin	Seimeni		right	41
Dunărea	Dunărea		right	23
Calachioi	Capidava		right	
Chichirgeaua	Tichilești		right	17
Ialomița	Near Hârșova		left	417
Călmățui	Berteștii de Jos		left	152
Topolog	Saraiu		right	50
Nămolești	Gârliciu		right	20
Valea Roștilor	Ostrov		right	28
Peceneaga	Peceneaga		right	19
Cerna	near Peceneaga		right	
Greci	near Turcoaia		right	13
Jilila	Lake Jijila		right	14
Siret	Galați, Romania	155.05	left	647
Prut	near Reni, Ukraine	134.144	left	953
Gârla Ciulineț	Rachelu		right	

== See also ==
- International Commission for the Protection of the Danube River
