= Bahna (disambiguation) =

Bahna may refer to:

== Romania ==
- Bahna, a commune in Neamț County
- Bahna, a village in Pârgărești Commune, Bacău County
- Bahna, a village in Ilovița Commune, Mehedinți County
- Bahna, a tributary of the Buhai in Botoșani County
- Bahna, a tributary of the Ciunca in Iași County
- Bahna (Danube), a tributary of the Danube in Mehedinți County

== Ukraine ==
- Bahna, Ukraine
