= Peceneaga (disambiguation) =

Peceneaga can refer to the following places in Romania:

- Peceneaga, a commune in Tulcea County
- Peceneaga, a tributary of the Bistra Mărului in Caraș-Severin County
- Peceneaga (Danube), also called Aiorman, a tributary of the Danube in Tulcea County
- Peceneaga, also called Pecineaga, a tributary of the Slănic in Buzău County

== See also ==
- Pecineaga
