= Barič, Golubac =

Barič Барич
- Village
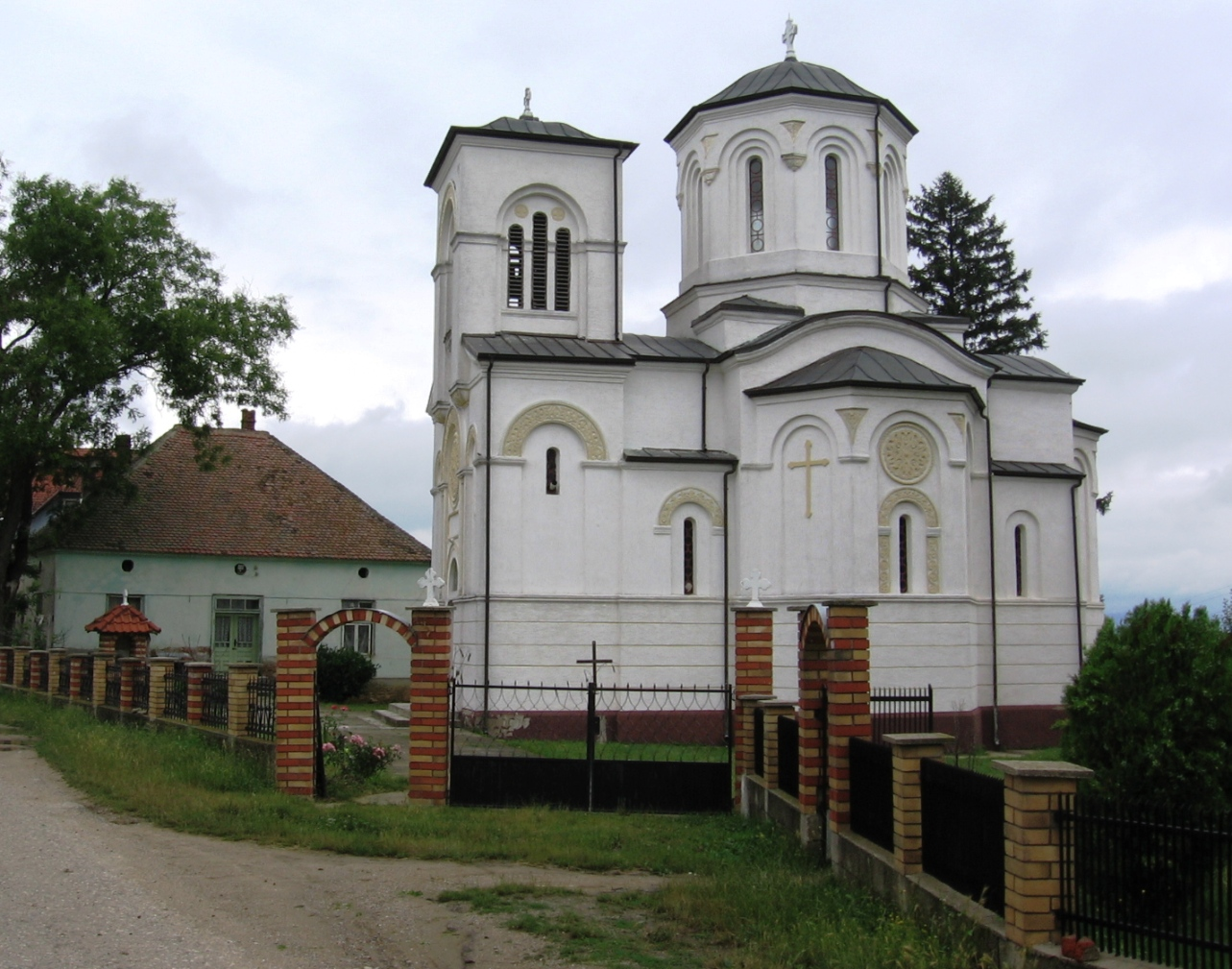
- Orthodox Church in Barič

- Location within Serbia
- Coordinates: 44°38′54″N 21°33′23″E
- Country: Serbia
- District: Braničevo District
- Municipality: Golubac

Population (2002)
  - Total: 464
- Time zone: UTC+1 (CET)
  - Summer (DST): UTC+2 (CEST)

Barič is a village in the municipality of Golubac, Serbia. According to the 2002 census, the village has a population of 464 people.
