= Bikinje =

- Village
- Location within Serbia
- Coordinates: 44°39′51″N 21°34′24″E
- Country: Serbia
- District: Braničevo District
- Municipality: Golubac

Population (2002)
  - Total: 265
- Time zone: UTC+1 (CET)
  - Summer (DST): UTC+2 (CEST)

Bikinje is a town in the municipality of Golubac, Serbia. According to the 2022 census, the village has a population of 160 people.
