= Sladinac =

- Village
- Location within Serbia
- Coordinates: 44°39′01″N 21°35′49″E
- Country: Serbia
- District: Braničevo District
- Municipality: Golubac

Population (2002)
  - Total: 191
- Time zone: UTC+1 (CET)
  - Summer (DST): UTC+2 (CEST)

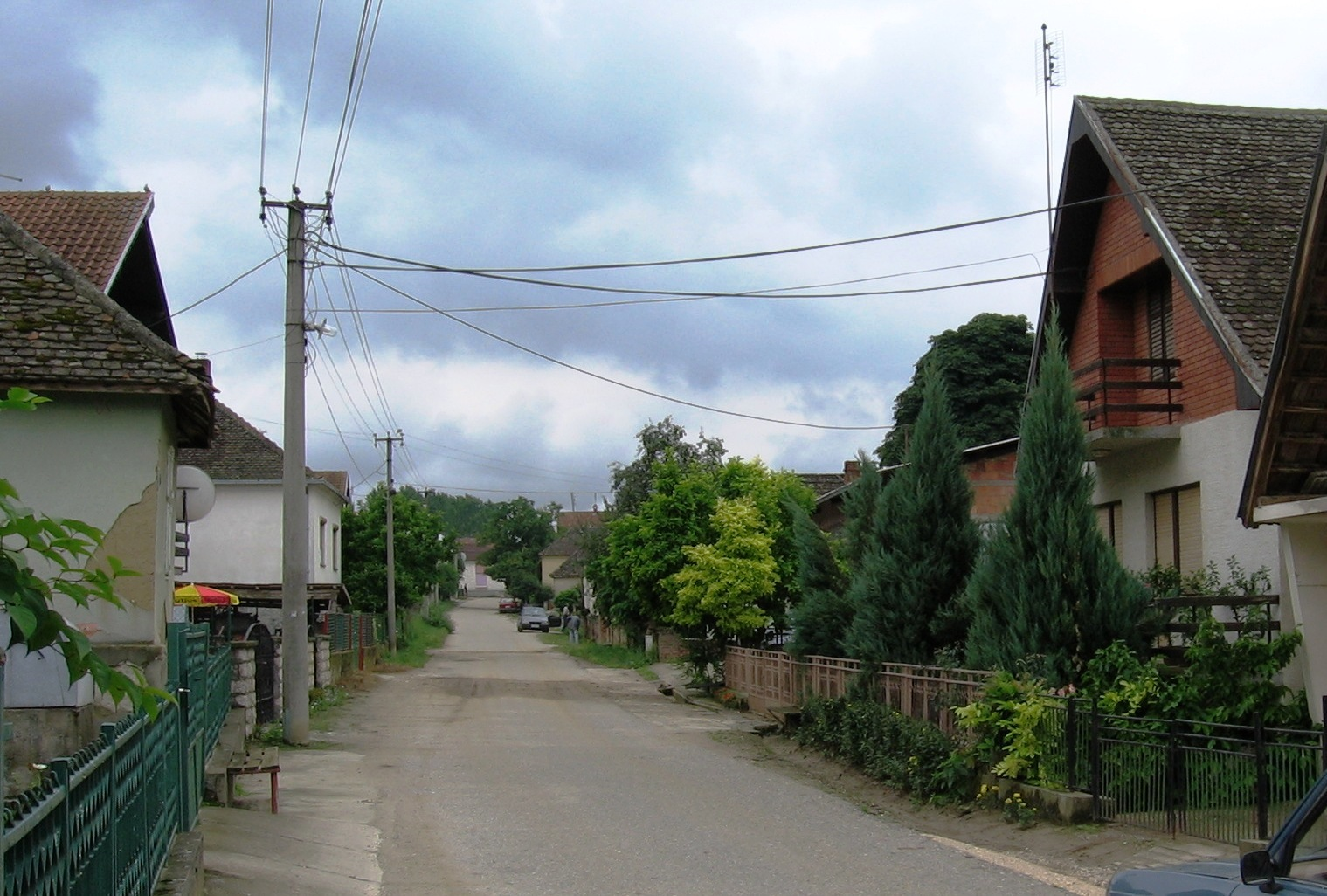
Street in Sladinac

Sladinac is a village in the municipality of Golubac, Serbia. According to the 2002 census, the village has a population of 191 people.
