= Mrčkovac =

- Village
- Location within Serbia
- Coordinates: 44°36′56″N 21°32′30″E
- Country: Serbia
- District: Braničevo District
- Municipality: Golubac

Population (2002)
  - Total: 328
- Time zone: UTC+1 (CET)
  - Summer (DST): UTC+2 (CEST)

Mrčkovac is a village in the municipality of Golubac, Serbia. It is about 30 minutes drive from the center of Golubac. According to the 2002 census, the village had a population of 328 people. According to the 2022 population census, the village had 187 people living in it - 85 women and 102 men.
