= Šuvajić =

- Village
- Location within Serbia
- Coordinates: 44°40′00″N 21°31′07″E
- Country: Serbia
- District: Braničevo District
- Municipality: Golubac

Population (2002)
  - Total: 339
- Time zone: UTC+1 (CET)
  - Summer (DST): UTC+2 (CEST)

Šuvajić is a village in the municipality of Golubac, Serbia. According to the 2002 census, the village has a population of 339 people.
