= Luncavița (Danube) =

River in Romania, tributary of Danube

Luncavița Cetățuia
- Location within Romania

Location
- Country: Romania
- Counties: Tulcea County
- Villages: Luncavița

Physical characteristics
- Source: Măcin Mountains
- Mouth: Gârla Ciulineț
  - location: Luncavița
  - coordinates: 45.2946°N 28.2888°E
- Length: 10 km (6.2 mi)
- Basin size: 58 km^{2} (22 sq mi)

Basin features
- Progression: Gârla Ciulineț→ Danube→ Black Sea
- Tributaries
  - left: Valea Fagilor
  - right: Valea Glonțului

The Luncavița (also known as Cetățuia in its upper course) is a river in Romania, tributary of the Gârla Ciulineț, which flows into the Danube. Its source is in the Măcin Mountains. It flows into the Gârla Ciulineț near the village Luncavița. Its length is 10 km (6.2 mi) and its basin size is 58 km^{2} (22 sq mi).
