= Kudreš =

- Village
- Location within Serbia
- Coordinates: 44°36′49″N 21°35′02″E
- Country: Serbia
- District: Braničevo District
- Municipality: Golubac

Population (2002)
  - Total: 193
- Time zone: UTC+1 (CET)
  - Summer (DST): UTC+2 (CEST)

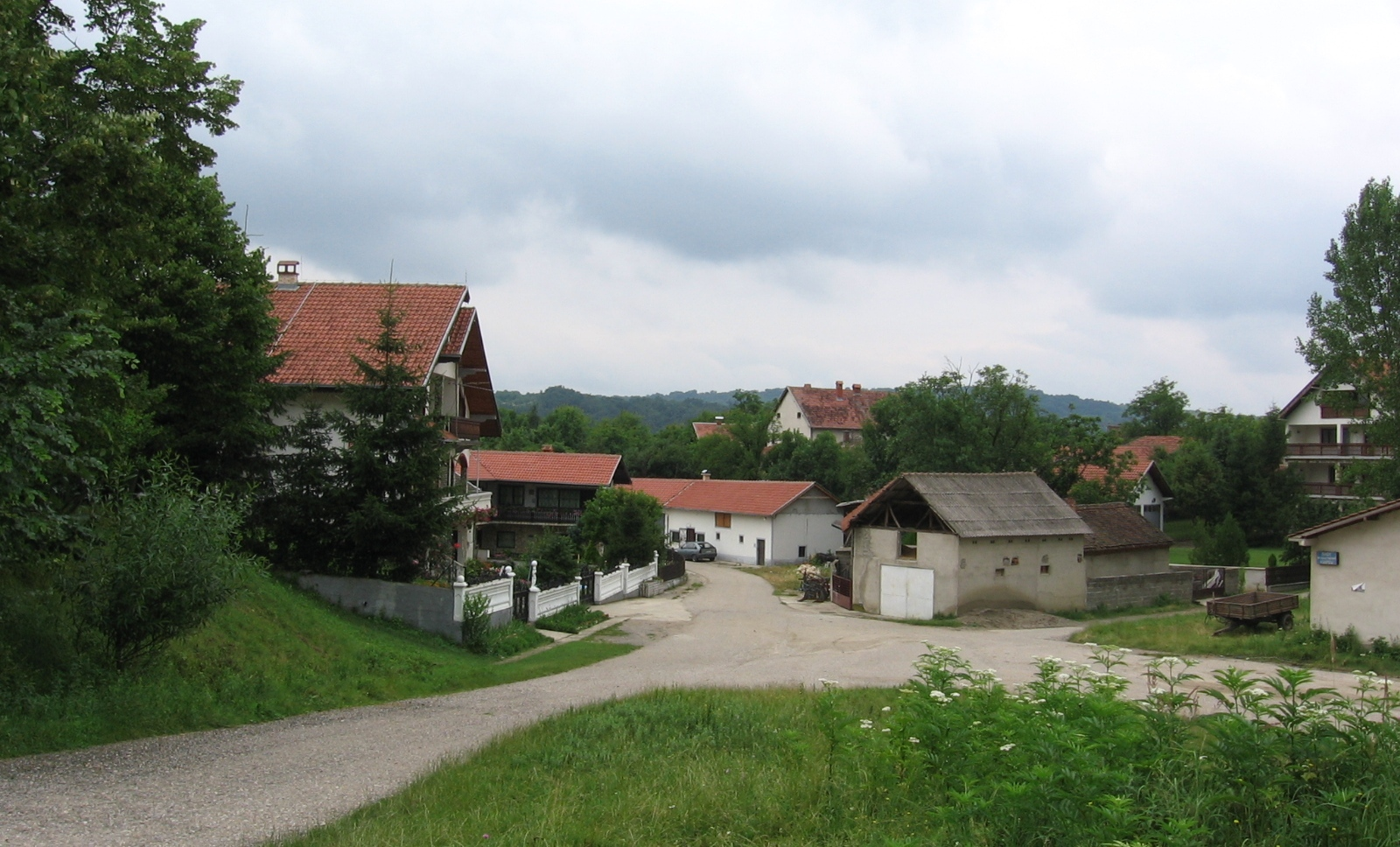
Kudreš

Kudreš is a small village in the municipality of Golubac, Serbia. According to the 2002 census, the village has a population of 193 people.

== Legend ==
The arrival of the Romans on the Balkan Peninsula was very significant for the population of the Balkans. In Serbia there are many settlements where the remains of their homes and temples are still visible. One of these buildings is located in the village of Kudres. In the village of Kudres, deep in the forest there are the remains of a Roman church from that period. The church, according to folk belief, is damned, and was therefore destroyed by the Turkish pasha. Legenda says that when the Turkish leader attempted to rob the church, his vassals were blinded. According to the belief of the locals, in the church there were plenty of gold from which the vassals were blinded. After that loss, the Turkish ordered that the church be collapsed to the ground. Today, only the dome can be seen of the church. The fate of the purported gold it housed is still unknown.
