= Gârla Ciulineț =

- Location within Romania

Location
- Country: Romania
- Counties: Tulcea County
- Villages: Văcăreni, Luncavița

Physical characteristics
- Mouth: Danube
  - coordinates: 45.3092°N 28.3734°E

Basin features
- Progression: Danube→ Black Sea
- Tributaries
  - right: Luncavița

The Gârla Ciulineț is a river in Romania, right tributary of the Danube. It flows into the Danube near Rachelu.
