= Vojilovo =

- Village
- Location within Serbia
- Coordinates: 44°38′03″N 21°35′40″E
- Country: Serbia
- District: Braničevo District
- Municipality: Golubac

Population (2002)
  - Total: 290
- Time zone: UTC+1 (CET)
  - Summer (DST): UTC+2 (CEST)

Vojilovo is a village in the municipality of Golubac, Serbia. According to the 2002 census, the village has a population of 290 people.
