= Dobra (Golubac) =

Dobra Добра
- Village
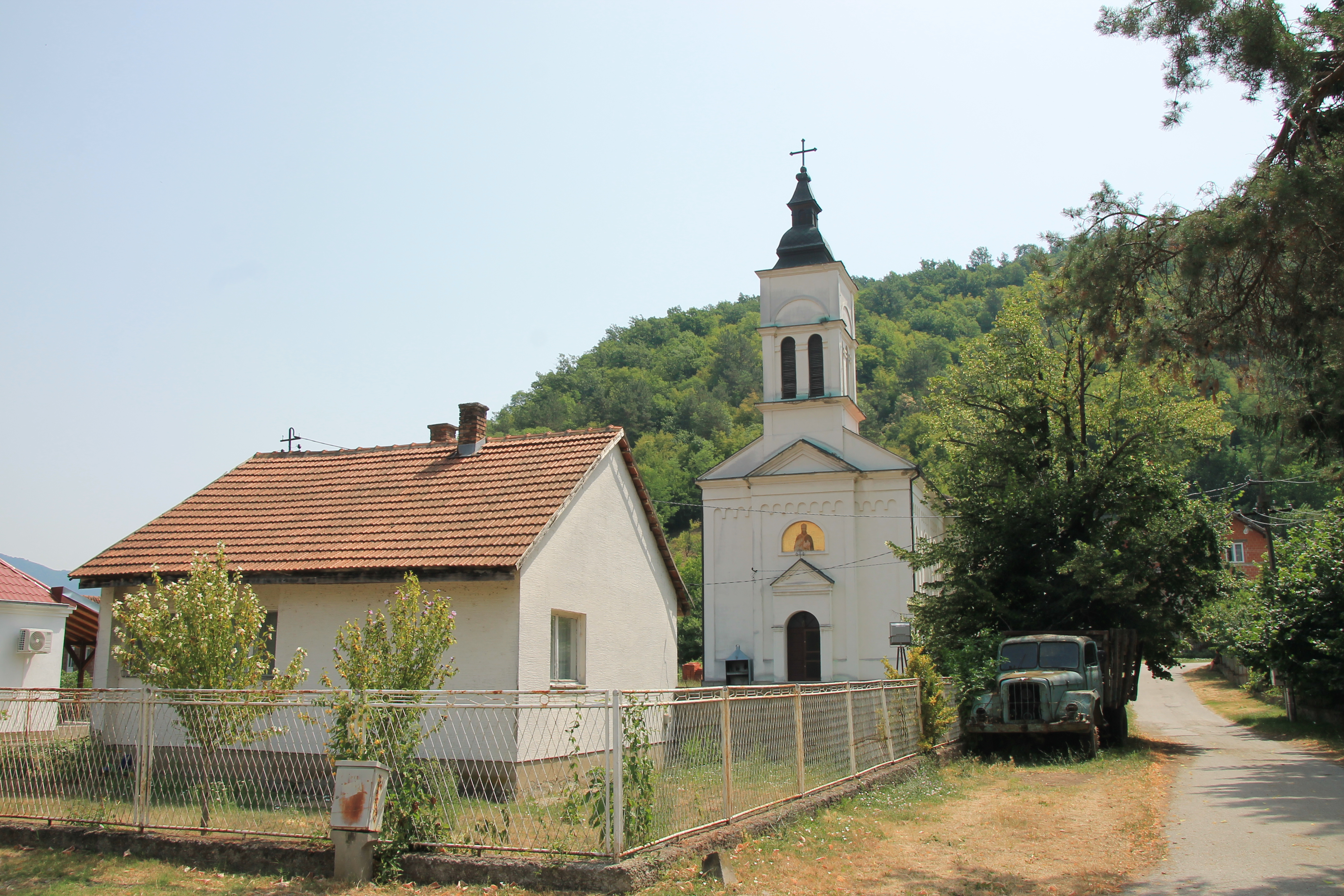

- Location within Serbia
- Coordinates: 44°38′17″N 21°54′34″E
- Country: Serbia
- District: Braničevo District
- Municipality: Golubac

Population (2002)
  - Total: 678
- Time zone: UTC+1 (CET)
  - Summer (DST): UTC+2 (CEST)

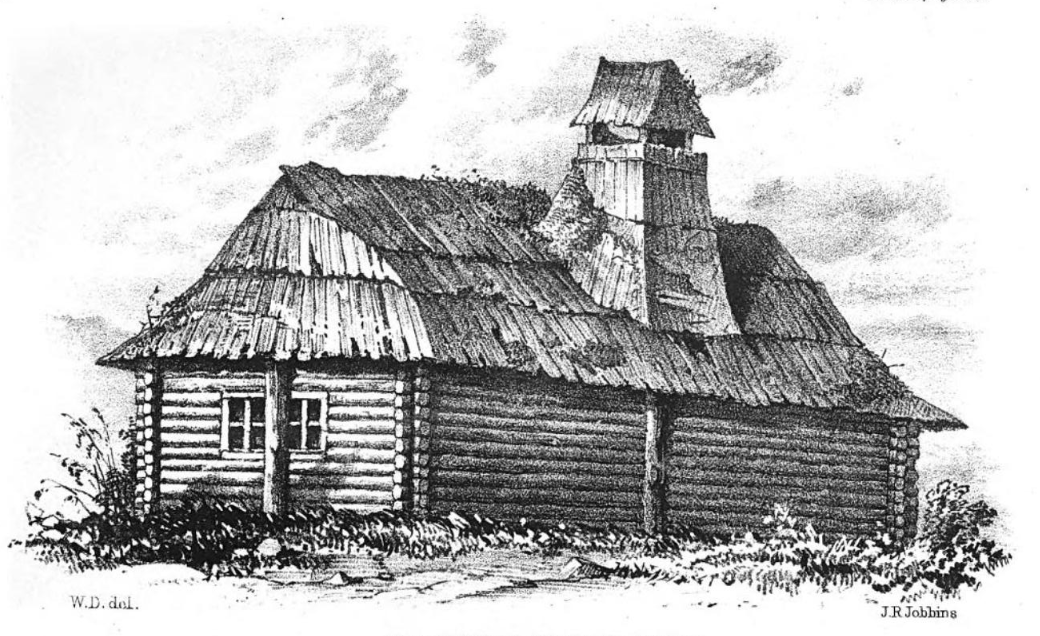
A cottage at Dobra, 1862

Dobra is a village in the municipality of Golubac, Serbia. According to the 2002 census, the village has a population of 678 people.
