= Bahna (Danube) =

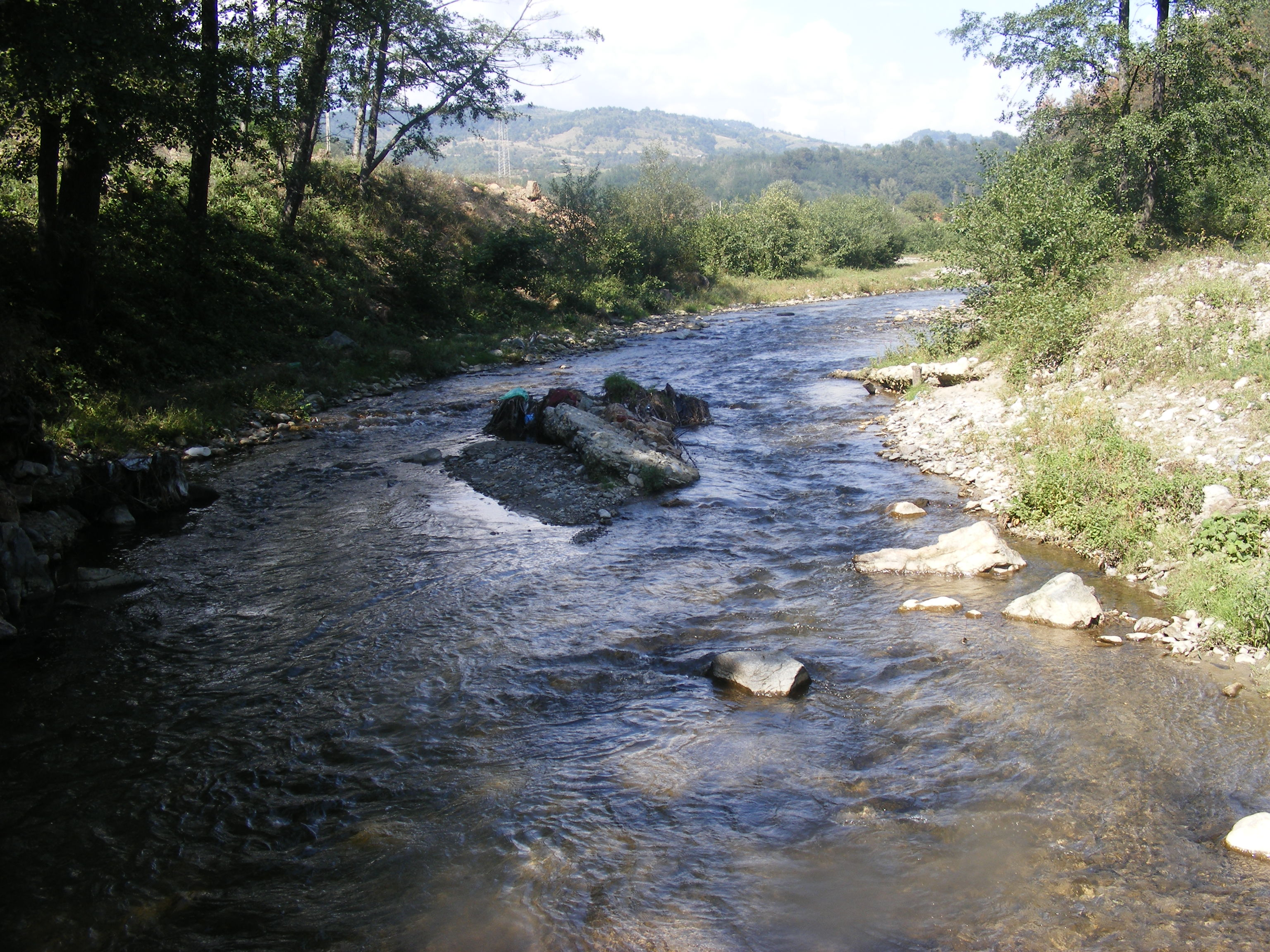

- Location within Romania

Location
- Country: Romania
- Counties: Mehedinți County
- Villages: Podeni, Moisești, Bahna, Ilovița

Physical characteristics
- Mouth: Danube
  - coordinates: 44.7206°N 22.4726°E

Basin features
- Progression: Danube→ Black Sea
- Tributaries
  - right: Cămana, Racovăț, Tarova

The Bahna is a small left tributary of the river Danube in Romania. It discharges into the Danube near Ilovița. Its length is 35 km (22 mi) and its basin size is 137 km^{2} (53 sq mi).
