= Chichirgeaua =

- Location within Romania

Location
- Country: Romania
- Counties: Constanța County
- Villages: Cloșca, Horia, Tichilești

Physical characteristics
- Mouth: Danube
  - coordinates: 44.6129°N 28.0378°E
- Length: 17 km (11 mi)
- Basin size: 148 km^{2} (57 sq mi)

Basin features
- Progression: Danube→ Black Sea
- Tributaries
  - left: Mandai, Crișan
- River code: XIV.1.45

The Chichirgeaua is a right tributary of the Danube in Romania. It flows into the Danube near Tichilești. Its length is 17 km (11 mi) and its basin size is 148 km^{2} (57 sq mi).
