= Usije =

Usije Усије
- Village
- Location within Serbia
- Coordinates: 44°41′02″N 21°36′04″E
- Country: Serbia
- District: Braničevo District
- Municipality: Golubac

Population (2002)
  - Total: 319
- Time zone: UTC+1 (CET)
  - Summer (DST): UTC+2 (CEST)

Usije (Serbian Cyrillic: Усије) is a village in the municipality of Golubac, Serbia. According to the 2002 census, the village has a population of 319 people.
