= Vidin Municipality =

Vidin Municipality Община Видин
- Municipality
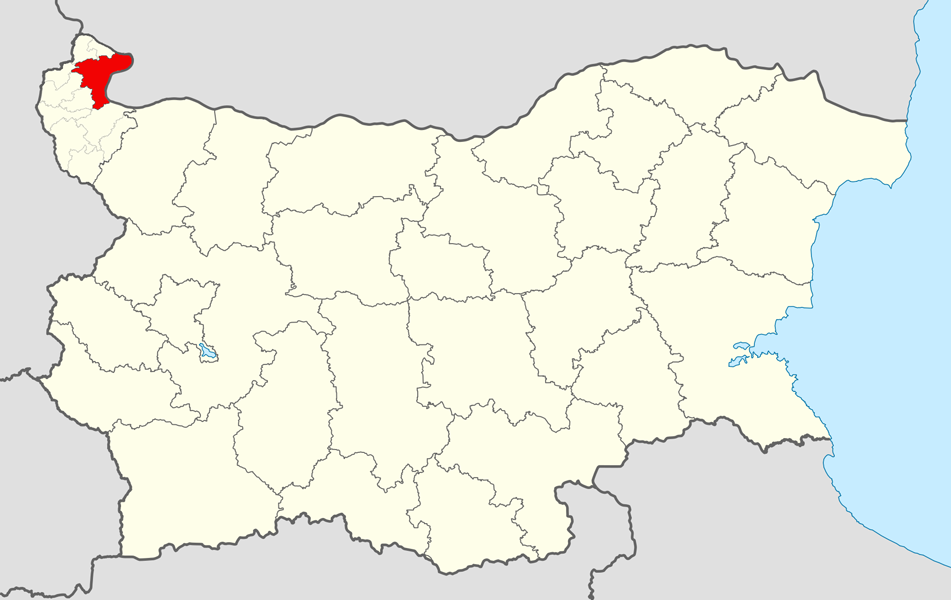
- Vidin Municipality within Bulgaria and Vidin Province.
- Coordinates: 43°59′N 22°48′E
- Country: Bulgaria
- Province (Oblast): Vidin
- Admin. centre (Obshtinski tsentar): Vidin

Area
  - Total: 501 km^{2} (193 sq mi)

Population (December 2021)
  - Total: 50,274
  - Density: 100/km^{2} (260/sq mi)
- Time zone: UTC+2 (EET)
  - Summer (DST): UTC+3 (EEST)

Vidin Municipality (Bulgarian: Община Видин) is a municipality (obshtina) in Vidin Province, Northwestern Bulgaria, located along the right bank of Danube river in the Danubian Plain. It is named after its administrative centre - the city of Vidin which is also the capital of the province.

The municipality embraces a territory of 501 km^{2} (193 sq mi) with a population of 66,126 inhabitants, as of December 2009.

The main road E79 crosses the area, connecting the province centre of Vidin with the city of Montana and respectively with the western operating part of Hemus motorway.

== Settlements ==
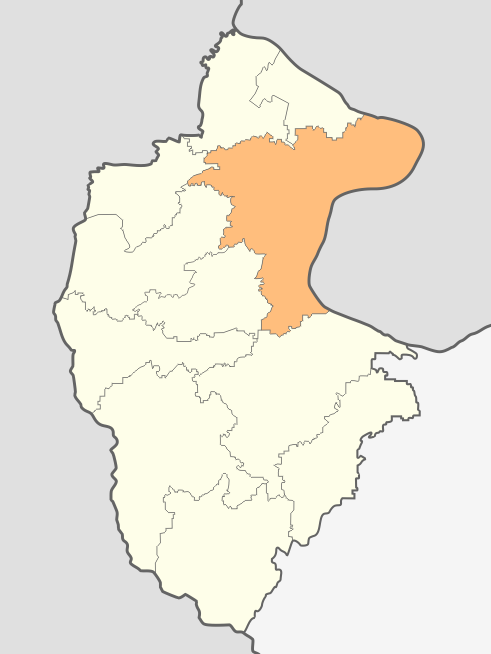
Vidin Municipality within Vidin Province

Vidin Municipality includes the following 34 places (towns are shown in bold):

Town/Village	Cyrillic	Population (December 2009)
**Vidin**	**Видин**	49,471
Akatsievo	Акациево	112
Antimovo	Антимово	616
Bela Rada	Бела Рада	608
Botevo	Ботево	82
Bukovets	Буковец	772
Dinkovitsa	Динковица	152
Dolni Boshnyak	Долни Бошняк	77
Druzhba	Дружба	220
**Dunavtsi**	**Дунавци**	2,743
Gaytantsi	Гайтанци	118
General Marinovo	Генерал Мариново	185
Gomotartsi	Гомотарци	798
Gradets	Градец	1,476
Ivanovtsi	Ивановци	113
Inovo	Иново	735
Kalenik	Каленик	279
Kapitanovtsi	Капитановци	1,186
Koshava	Кошава	415
Kutovo	Кутово	837
Mayor Uzunovo	Майор Узуново	334
Novoseltsi	Новоселци	879
Peshakovo	Пешаково	
Plakuder	Плакудер	94
Pokrayna	Покрайна	1,301
Ruptsi	Рупци	165
Sinagovtsi	Синаговци	430
Slana Bara	Слана бара	537
Slanotran	Сланотрън	595
Tarnyane	Търняне	166
Tsar Simeonovo	Цар Симеоново	115
Voynitsa	Войница	123
Vartop	Въртоп	97
Zheglitsa	Жеглица	194
Total		66,126

== Demography ==
Historical population
Year	Pop.	±%
1946	45,345	—
1956	50,126	+10.5%
1965	60,839	+21.4%
1975	76,522	+25.8%
1985	82,239	+7.5%
1992	86,543	+5.2%
2001	77,500	−10.4%
2011	63,257	−18.4%
2021	47,847	−24.4%

The following table shows the change of the population since the 1946 census. Since 1992 Vidin Municipality has comprised the former municipality of Dunavtsi and the numbers in the table reflect this unification.

=== Ethnicity ===
According to the 2011 census, among those who answered the optional question on ethnic identification, the ethnic composition of the municipality was the following:

Ethnic group	Population	Percentage
Bulgarians	54546	92.4%
Turks	66	0.1%
Roma (Gypsy)	3753	6.4%
Other	322	0.5%
Undeclared	345	0.6%

=== Religion ===
According to the latest Bulgarian census of 2011, the religious composition, among those who answered the optional question on religious identification, was the following:

Religious composition of Vidin Municipality
Orthodox Christianity	84.3%
Catholicism	0.4%
Protestantism	1.4%
Islam	0.1%
No religion	7.1%
Prefer not to answer, others and indefinable	6.7%

An overwhelming majority of the population of Vidin Municipality identify themselves as Christians. At the 2011 census, 84.3% of respondents identified as Orthodox Christians belonging to the Bulgarian Orthodox Church.

== See also ==
- Provinces of Bulgaria
- Municipalities of Bulgaria
- List of cities and towns in Bulgaria
