= Mala (river) =

- Location within Romania

Location
- Country: Romania
- Counties: Mehedinți County

Physical characteristics
- Mouth: Danube
  - location: Porțile de Fier I Reservoir
  - coordinates: 44.6842°N 22.3461°E
- Length: 12 km (7.5 mi)
- Basin size: 18 km^{2} (6.9 sq mi)

Basin features
- Progression: Danube→ Black Sea

The Mala is a small left tributary of the Danube in Romania. It discharges into the Porțile de Fier I Reservoir, which is drained by the Danube, near Eșelnița. Its length is 12 km (7.5 mi) and its basin size is 18 km^{2} (6.9 sq mi).
