= Eșelnița (river) =

- Location within Romania

Location
- Country: Romania
- Counties: Mehedinți County

Physical characteristics
- Mouth: Danube
  - location: Eșelnița
  - coordinates: 44.6907°N 22.3662°E
- Length: 26 km (16 mi)
- Basin size: 77 km^{2} (30 sq mi)
- Discharge
  - location: Near mouth
  - average: 0.35 m^{3}/s (12 cu ft/s)

Basin features
- Progression: Danube→ Black Sea

The Eșelnița is a small left tributary of the river Danube in Romania. It discharges into the Danube in the village Eșelnița. Its length is 26 km (16 mi) and its basin size is 77 km^{2} (30 sq mi).
