= Constantin Schifirneț =

Romanian sociologist and historian

Constantin Schifirneț (born August 29, 1945) is a Romanian sociologist and historian of philosophy.

== Biography ==
He was born in Bahna, Neamț County, son of Maria Schifirneț, née Movileanu, and of Neculai Schifirneț. In 1968 he graduated from the Faculty of Philosophy of the University of Iași with a master's degree in philosophy. Between 1968 and 1990 he worked as a researcher at the Research Centre on Youth in Bucharest. In 1980, he earned a Ph.D. in philosophy from the University of Bucharest.

In February–May 1981 he was a visiting scholar at Boston University and the University of California, Berkeley in the United States. He has presented papers at international scientific congresses and conferences organized in Romania, France, England, China, Denmark, Israel, Germany, Italy, Russia, Hungary, Bulgaria, Cuba, and Belgium. He is a member of the European Sociological Association and the International Sociological Association, Dean and Founder of the Political Sciences Department at Dimitrie Cantemir University in Bucharest.

Between 1990 and 1994 he was part of the Government of Romania as general director in Ministry of Culture, Bucharest. Schifirneț is professor of sociology at the National School of Administration and Political Science of Bucharest, Romania. In 2007, he was awarded a prize by the Romanian Academy for his work, C. Rãdulescu-Motru. His Life and Activities. His scientific interests are sociology and anthropology, Romanian philosophy and sociology, modernisation, sociology of age and generations, communication. He has coordinated „Ethnos”' collection of Albatros Printing House. He has republished 30 titles of Romanian works - a lot of them for the first time since first edition

He has contribution in modernisation and development sociology, in age and generations sociology, in the study of Romanian thinkers, and especially Constantin Rădulescu-Motru. For instance, he has examined the outlook of Rădulescu-Motru about philosophy of Kant.

Schifirneţ is one of the first Romanian researchers who have scientifically researched the topic of mass media and brought a valuable contribution to the development of this subject in the Romanian research literature before 1989. Since 1968, he has conducted several academic studies on the impact of mass communication on public opinion formation. Schifirneţ has coordinated in 1969, empirical research 'Opinions of students', first sociological research in Romania on a national sample. A summary of the findings of this research was published in the volume 'Student and Society' (coordinators F. Mahler, A. Mihu, C. Schifirnet), 1973. In 1971, together with Ovidiu Bădina, he coordinated the volume Youth and Mass Media.

In his book, “Generaţie şi cultură” (Generation and Culture, 1985), Schifirneţ defined culture through a series of antagonist categories such as: classic culture - modern culture, traditional culture - mass media culture, and generation culture - global culture. He identified the interferences between different levels of culture and also the multiple relationships between the cultural behavior of a social group and various types of culture. His approach on the term of generation allowed him to develop the sociology of age and generations that was lacking from the Romanian sociological literature of that time. In his works, he demonstrated the existence of a conflict between generations in the socialist society. His scientific studies on subculture and counterculture (1981, 1985) were the first in the Romanian sociology to approach these two notions. During those years, these concepts were rejected by the Romanian sociologists because of their bourgeois belongings and were considered to be irrelevant in the analysis of the communist society. Through the analysis of the works of major Romanian thinkers, he succeeds in updating relevant concepts related to the term of nation such as: ethnic identity and agents of modernization in the Romanian society. He elaborated a monograph of the “forms without substance” theory in his book Formele fără fond, un brand românesc (The Forms without Substance, a Romanian Brand), 2007.

Schifirneţ has studied historical particularities the modern evolution of Romanians. The modernisation has begun with political institutional construction and not with the building of capitalist economy. The Romanian modernization was against boyars and social traditional structures. But a lot of traditional elements had outlived the new capitalist political-juridical organism from Romanian society. Romania is still a country which faced a late modernization; in the same time it has got many elements of modernity which fail to coagulate stable modern structures in all departments of society. Schifirneţ launched and developed the concept of tendential modernity. This concept explains the role of modernity for building political and legal institutional framework necessary to develop modern nation in a society with underdeveloped economy. Throughout its history, the Romanian state gave priority to the national construction and the problems related to the economic and social development were postponed or subordinated to the national issue. Tendential modernity describes the evolution of modernization processes within the societies that are only partially functional. Schifirneţ thinks that it is useful to analyze the Romanian modernization processes under the notion of tendential modernity. This means the development in the opposite direction: from the affirmation of national spirit and political construction towards economical development. In Romanian society modernity is a trend, which coexists with obsolete institutional forms and ancient substance. Tendential modernity penetrates slowly and hard through the complicated network of socio-institutional structures of the traditional and patriarchal Romanian society. Since it has no clear dominant form, it is a mosaic modernity. Modernity is the framework and the element which supports the Romanian nation, but not by means of economical way, as a basis of a national state. Modernity is a tendency, an ideal in the construction of a nation.

== Awards ==
2007: The Romanian Academy Prize for his work C. Rãdulescu-Motru. His Life and Activities.

== Books ==
- Schifirneţ, C., 1973 - Studentul şi societatea (The Student and Society)(coord. and author)
- Schifirneţ, C., 1974 - Adolescenţii şi cultura (coauthor) (The Adolescences and Culture) Library of Congress LCCN permalink
- Schifirneţ, C., 1985 - Generaţie şi cultură (Generation and Culture) Library of Congress LCCN permalink
- Schifirneţ, C., 1987 - Tineretul între permanenţă şi înnoire (The Youth between permanence and Innovation)
- Schifirneţ, C., 1991 - Lectura şi biblioteca publică (The Reading and Public Library)
- Schifirneţ, C., 1993 - La lecture d'est en ouest (in colab.), Paris
- Schifirneţ, C., 1996 - Civilizaţie modernă şi naţiune. Mihail Kogălniceanu, Titu Maiorescu, Mihai Eminescu (The Modern Civilization and Nation) Library of Congress LCCN permalink
- Schifirneţ, C., 1997 - Educaţia adulţilor în schimbare (Adult Education in Change)
- Schifirneţ, C., 1999 – Sociologie (Sociology) (2nd edition - 2002, 3rd edition - 2004)
- Schifirneţ, C., 2001 - Geneza modernă a ideii naţionale. Psihologie etnică şi identitate naţională (The Modern Genesis of National Idea. Ethnic Psychology and National Identity) Library of Congress LCCN permalink
- Schifirneţ, C., 2003-2005 - C. Rădulescu-Motru. Viaţa şi faptele sale, vol. I-III (C. Rădulescu-Motru.His Life and Activities, vol. I-III) Library of Congress LCCN permalink
- Schifirneţ, C., 2007 - Formele fără fond, un brand românesc (The Forms without Substance, a Romanian Brand) Library of Congress LCCN permalink
- Schifirneţ, C., 2009 - Sociologie românească modernă (Modern Romanian Sociology)
- Schifirneţ, C., 2011 - Europenizarea societăţii româneşti şi mass-media (Europeanization of the Romanian society and mass-media)(coord. and author)
- Schifirneţ, C., 2012 - Filosofia românească în spaţiul public. Modernitate şi europenizare (Romanian philosophy in public space. Modernity and Europeanization) Library of Congress LCCN permalink
- Schifirneţ, C., 2013 - Românii, cum au fost şi cum sunt( Romanians, as they were and as are)
- Schifirneţ, C., 2014 - Mass-media, modernitate tendențială şi europenizare în era Internetului (Mass media, Tendential Modernity and Europeanization in the Internet Age)
- Schifirneţ, C., 2016 - Modernitatea tendențială. Reflecții despre despre evoluția modernă a societății (Tendential modernity. Reflections on about the evolution of modern society)
- Schifirneţ, C., 2021 - Tendential modernity
- Schifirneţ, C., 2024 - Destin și o viață de om ( Destiny and a life by man)

== Research reports ==
1. Construcția mediatică a europenizării ca problemă publică în contextul integrării europene a societății românești (coordonator), Facultatea de Comunicare și Relații Publice, SNSPA, 2011, 297 pg.;

2. Educație, școală și creativitate, Centrul de Cercetări și Studii pentru Tineret, Asociația Națională de Sprijin a Inițiativelor Tinerilor, 2005, 36 pg.;

3. Relații sociale ale tinerilor, Centrul de Cercetări și Studii pentru Tineret, Asociația Națională de Sprijin a Inițiativelor Tinerilor, 2003, 30 pg.;

4. Sisteme alternative de formare a tineretului - Relația dintre instituții de învățământ și sistemele alternative, Centrul de Studii și Cercetări pentru Problemele Tineretului (CSCPT), mai 1998, 56 pg.;

5. Sistemele alternative de formare a tineretului-Impactul sistemelor alternative cu raporturile între generații, CSCPT, septembrie 1998, 91 pg.;

6. Sisteme alternative de formare a tineretului - Strategii, instituții și experiențe în educația permanentă, CSCPT, noiembrie 1998, 56 pg.;

7. Starea tineretului din România, capitolele Educație, Consum cultural CSCPT, noiembrie 1998, 61 pg.;

8. Sisteme alternative de formare a tineretului - Politici de educație alternativă, CSCPT, martie 1997, 43 pg.;

9. Sisteme alternative de formare a tineretului. Diagnoza situației actuale prin politicile de educație alternativă în România, august 1997, 67 pg.;

10. Sisteme alternative de formare a tineretului. Dificultăți și limite ale influenței sistemelor alternative asupra tineretului CSCPT, noiembrie 1997, 96 pg.;

11. Potențialul creativ al tineretului român: Forme instituționale și neinstituționale de manifestare a creativității tinerilor, CSCPT martie 1996, 52 pg.;

12. Potențialul creativ al tineretului român: Modalități de implicare socială a tinerilor înalt creativi, CSCPT, noiembrie 1996, 98 pg.;

13. Educația adulților în perioada de tranziție, Institutul de Cercetare a Calității Vieții, 1994-1995, 87 pg.;

14. Vârsta și cultura populară, C.C.P.T., 1988, 156 pg.;

15. Cititor, carte, biblioteca publică, 1989, 156 pg.;

16. Cultură, instituții culturale și socializarea tineretului, C.C.P.T., 1987, 194 pg.;

17. Integrarea socio-profesională a tinerilor din mediul rural si mediul urban, C.C.P.T., 1986, 163 pg. + anexe;

18. Tineretul universitar - interese pentru studiu și aspirații profesionale, C.C.P.T., 1986, 169 pg. + anexe;

19. Cultură, tineret, mass media, educație, C.C.P.T., 1986, 351 p. + anexe (99 p.);

20 . Dinamica opțiunilor culturale, C.C.P.T., 1985, 117 pg.;

21. Atitudinea tinerilor față de sat, 1982, 30 pg.;

22. Nivelul de cunoștințe artistice al tinerilor, C.C.P.T., 1982, 46 pg.;

23. Pregătirea pentru profesie a tineretului universitar, C.C.P.T., 1982, 157 pg.;

24. Mass media și tineretul (coautor), C.C.P.T.1982, 50 pg.;

25. Comportament și opțiuni culturale ale tinerilor, C.C.P.T., 1981, 150 pg.;

26. Interese manifestate de tineri în timpul liber, capitol din raportul colectiv Aspirații, cerințe și orientări ale tineretului în petrecerea timpului liber (coordonator Petre Datculescu) C.C.P.T., 1980, 20 pg.;

27. Orizontul de cultură al tinerilor muncitori, capitol din raportul colectiv Aspecte calitative ale forței de muncă tinere din industria, C.C.P.T, 1978, 40 pg.;

28. Activitatea profesională, de cercetare științifică și practică a studenților, etapa a-II-a, C.C.P.T.,1976, 104 pg.;

29. Activitatea profesională, de cercetare științifică și practică a studenților, etapa I- a, C.C.P.T., 1975, 80 pg.;

30. Structura și organizarea activităților organizațiilor studențești, C.C.P.T., 1972, (I), 168 pg., 1973 (II), 102 pg.;

31. Interese culturale ale adolescenților liceeni, C.C.P.T., 1971, 168 pg.;

32. Forme și metode de educație politică a studenților, C.C.P.T., 1970, 30 pg.;

33. Structura socială a tineretului universitar (în colaborare), C.C.P.T., 1970, 50 pg.;

34. Comportament și nivel de cunoastere politică al studenților (în colaborare), C.C.P.T., 1970, 193 pg.

== Bibliography ==
- Dictionarul General al Literaturii Române, S/T (General Dictionary of Romanian Literature, S/T) Editura Univers enciclopedic, 2007, p. 128.
- Ştefan Costea (coordonator), Sociologi români (Romanian Sociologists), Editura Expert, 2001, pp. 395–396
- Enciclopedia marilor personalităţi, (Enciclopedy of Personalities) volumul V, Editura Geneze, 2003, pp. 355–359.
- Septimiu Chelcea, Interviu cu Constantin Schifirneţ la 60 de ani, (Interview with Constantin Schifirneţ) "Sociologie românească", volumul III, nr. 3, toamna 2005, pp. 245–258.
- Brânduşa Negulescu, De la răzeş la universitar (From Peasant to Professor), Paideea, nr. 4, 2005, pp. 38–49.
