= Antimovo =

Antimovo Антимово
- Village
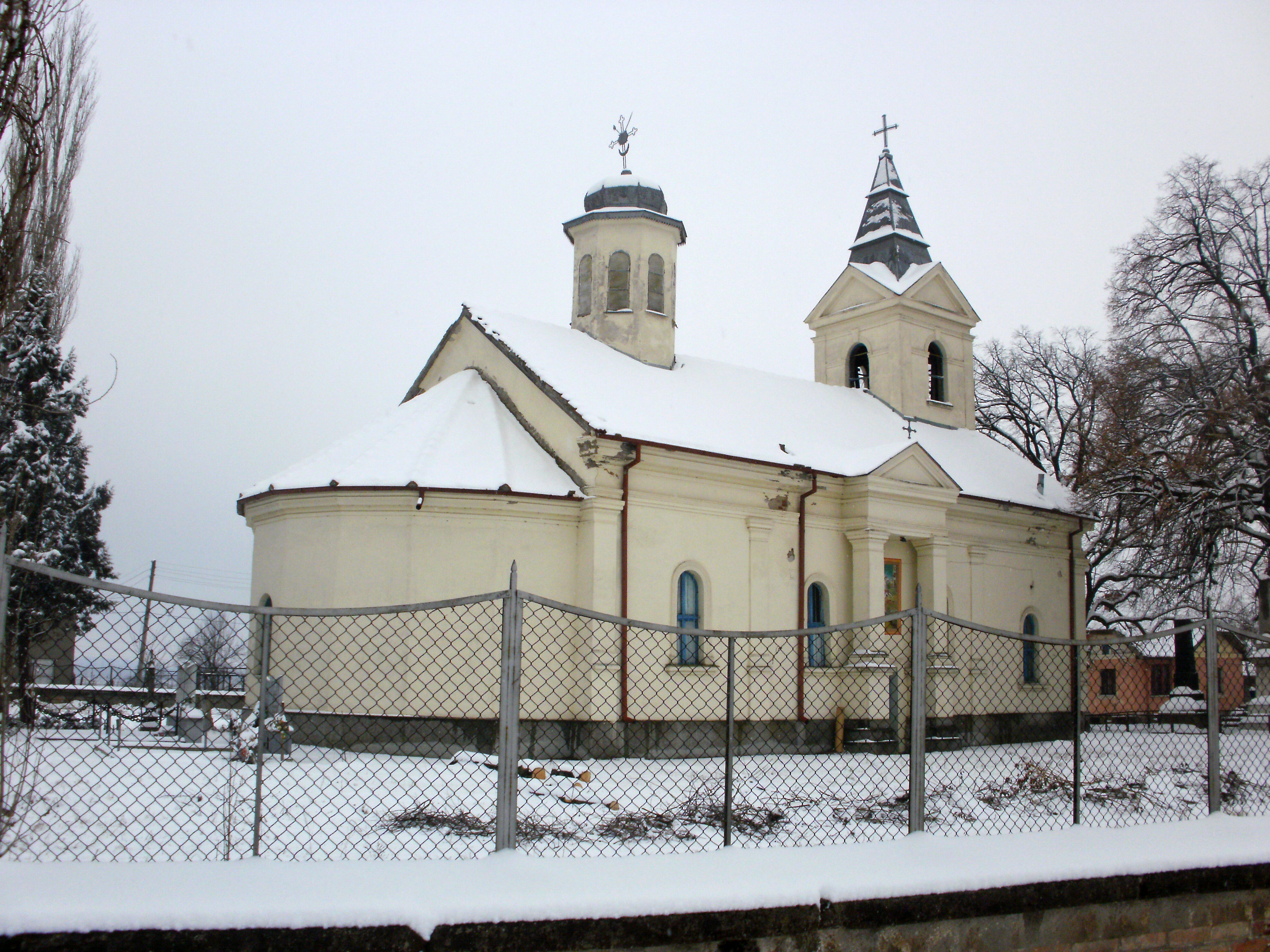
- Church of St George in Antimovo

- Location within Bulgaria
- Coordinates: 44.0276326°N 22.9416606°E
- Country: Bulgaria
- Province: Vidin Province
- Municipality: Vidin
- Elevation: 40 m (130 ft)

Population (2015)
  - Total: 538
- Time zone: UTC+2 (EET)
  - Summer (DST): UTC+3 (EEST)

Antimovo is a village in Vidin Municipality, Vidin Province, Bulgaria.
