= Conon Arămescu-Donici =

Romanian Orthodox metropolitan bishop (1912–1918)

His Eminence Conon Arămescu-Donici
- Metropolitan-Primate of Romania
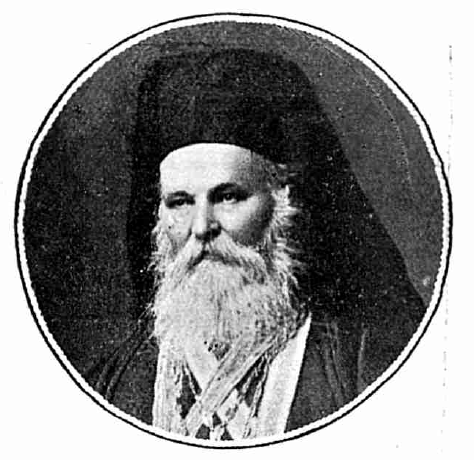
- Church: Romanian Orthodox
- Archdiocese: Bucharest
- Elected: 1912
- Term ended: 1918
- Predecessor: Atanasie Mironescu
- Successor: Patriarch Miron of Romania

Personal details
- Born: 2 February 1837 Urzici-Arămești, Neamț County, Moldavia
- Died: 7 August 1922 (aged 85) Bucharest, Kingdom of Romania

Conon Arămescu-Donici (Romanian pronunciation: [koˈnon arəˈmesku ˈdonit͡ʃʲ]; February 2, 1837 – August 7, 1922) was Metropolitan-Primate of the Romanian Orthodox Church between 1912 and 1918. In conflict with the authorities of modern Romania, he was forced to resign due to his collaboration with German occupation troops during World War I.

== Biography ==
Born in Urzici-Arămești, Neamț County (the state of Moldavia), into a family of priests, Arămescu-Donici studied at the Târgu Neamț and Socola Seminaries, then at the University of Iași, graduating in literature in 1877. He was tonsured a monk at Neamț Monastery and later became a hierodeacon at Socola Monastery. He was a teacher at National School of Iași, and then at Normal School, between 1877 and 1880. Between 1880 and 1885, he studied theology at Czernowitz Francis-Joseph University, in Austria-Hungary, gaining recognition as Doctor of Divinity.

Arămescu-Donici was elected on February 8, 1902, to be the Bishop of Huși (enthroned March 3, 1902). On February 14, 1912, he was elected by the Romanian Synod to the office of Metropolitan-Primate, being enthroned five days later, on February 19.

Metropolitan Conon's most problematic stances were expressed during World War I, a period of political division. In 1916, Romania joined the Entente, but rapidly lost the Battle of Bucharest to the Central Powers: their armies occupied the city and forced the government to move the capital to Iași. Conon, who stayed behind in occupied Bucharest, was persuaded by the German authorities to sign a letter to the soldiers and the Orthodox faithful in Moldavia, urging them to give up the fight against Germany. The letter, written by author Gala Galaction at the request of collaborationist politician Virgil Arion, was later modified by the German authorities without Galaction's consent, and dropped as airborne leaflet propaganda over the Romanian trenches.

After the war, accused of betrayal, Conon resigned on January 1, 1919, being replaced by Miron Cristea.
