= Akatsievo =

Akatsievo Акациево
- Village
- Location within Bulgaria
- Coordinates: 44.0160546°N 22.8068367°E
- Country: Bulgaria
- Province: Vidin Province
- Municipality: Vidin
- Elevation: 44 m (144 ft)

Population (2015)
  - Total: 88
- Time zone: UTC+2 (EET)
  - Summer (DST): UTC+3 (EEST)

Akatsievo is a village in Vidin Municipality, Vidin Province, Bulgaria.
