= Gârcov =

- Commune
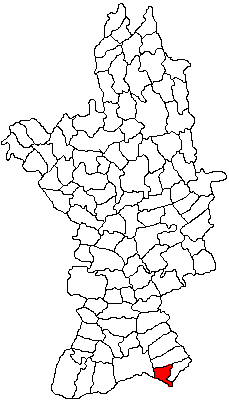
- Location in Olt County

- Location in Romania
- Coordinates: 43°45′32″N 24°36′48″E
- Country: Romania
- County: Olt
- Population (2021-12-01): 2,047
- Time zone: EET/EEST (UTC+2/+3)
- Vehicle reg.: OT

Gârcov is a commune in Olt County, Oltenia, Romania. It is composed of two villages, Gârcov and Ursa.
