= Dunavtsi =

Town in Bulgaria

Dunavtsi Дунавци
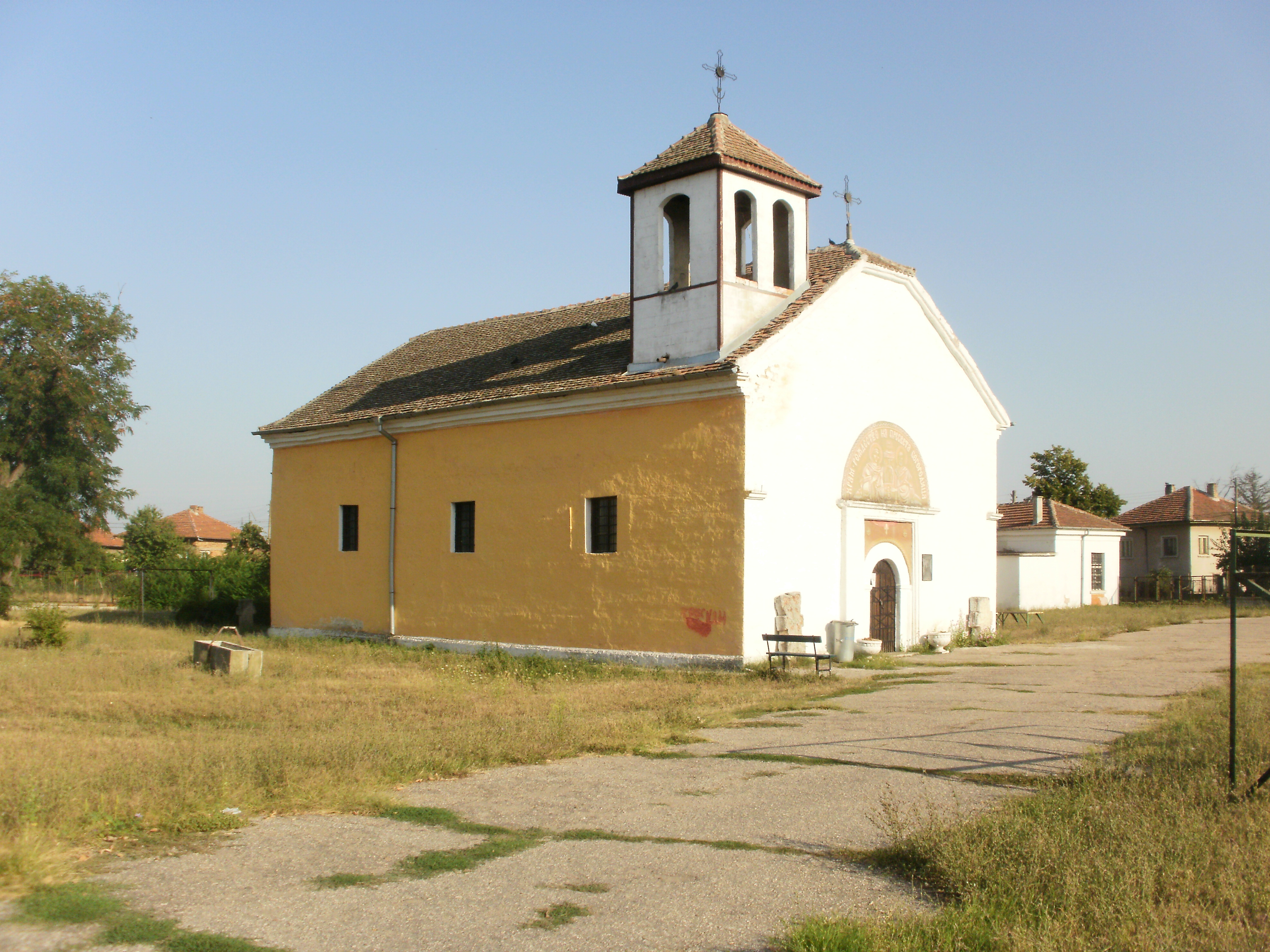
- Nativity of Mary Church

- Location of Dunavtsi
- Coordinates: 43°55′N 22°49′E
- Country: Bulgaria
- Provinces (Oblast): Vidin

Government
  - Mayor: Dimo Skorchev
- Elevation: 35 m (115 ft)

Population (December 2009)
  - Total: 2,743
- Time zone: UTC+2 (EET)
  - Summer (DST): UTC+3 (EEST)
- Postal Code: 3740
- Area code: 09314

Dunavtsi (Bulgarian: Дунавци, pronounced [ˈdunɐft͡si], lit. 'Danubians') is a town in northwestern Bulgaria, part of Vidin Municipality, Vidin Province. It lies in the northwestern Danubian Plain, in a small valley adjacent to the Danube River. As of December 2009, the town had a population of 2,743.

Dunavtsi was formed on 12 December 1955 through the merger of the villages Vidbol and Gurkovo, today regarded as town neighbourhoods. It was proclaimed an urban-type settlement on 11 September 1964 and acquired town privileges on 4 September 1974. From 1949 until 1987, it was the administrative centre of a municipality, but today it is a part of Vidin municipality. The Vidbol River flows into the Danube southeast of the town.

Dunavtsi is an agricultural town located near the Sofia–Vidin road, part of European route E79 and IV Pan-European transport corridor, and the Mezdra–Vidin railway. The town has a railway station at Vidbol and a railway stop at Sinagovtsi–Gurkovo. The local economy is represented by a fodder factory. Since 2011, the mayor has been Dimcho Skorchev.
