= Gaißa =

River in Germany

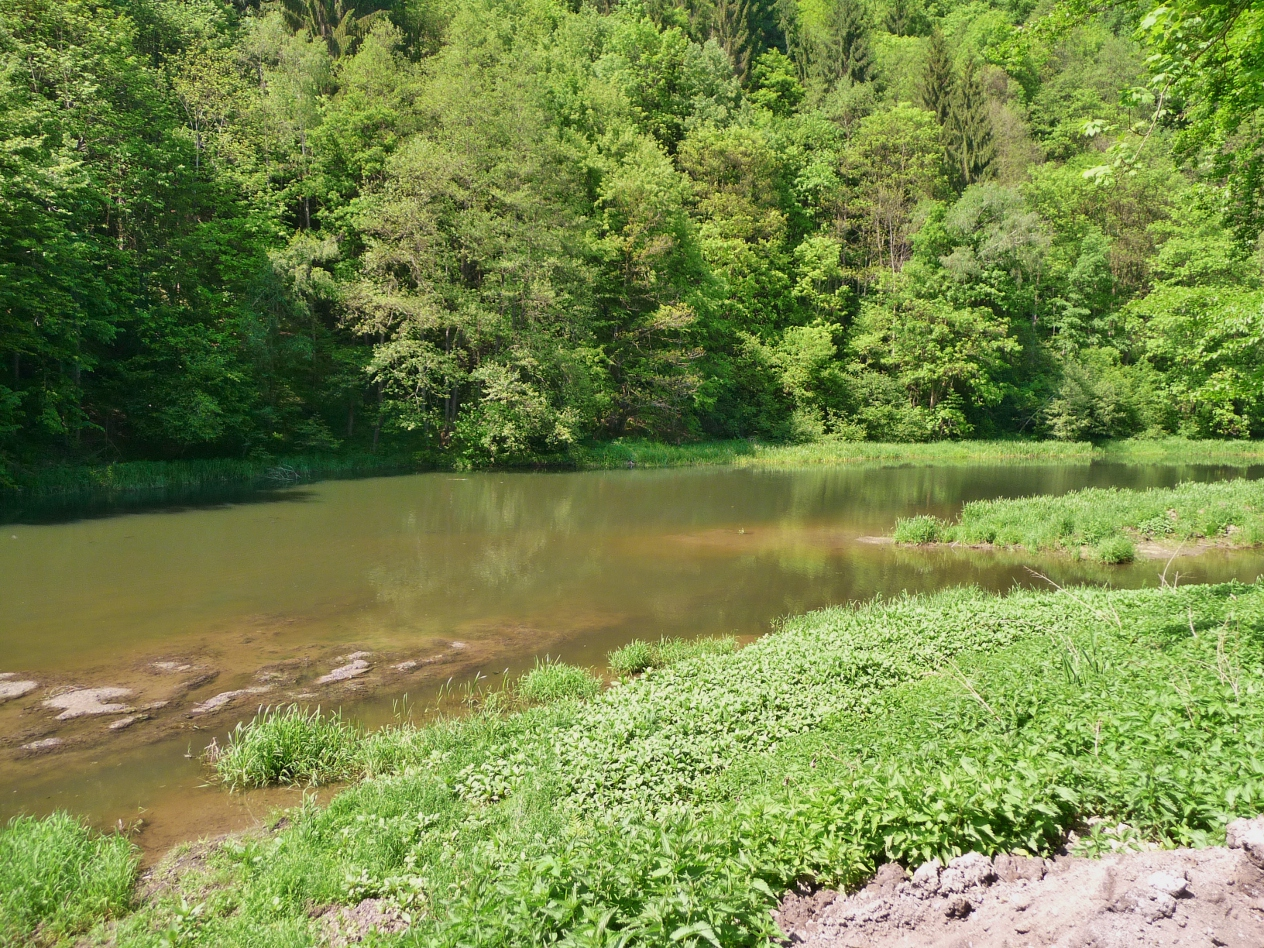
- Gaißa

Location
- Country: Germany

Physical characteristics
- Source
  - location: Bavarian Forest
- Mouth
  - location: Danube
  - coordinates: 48°35′55″N 13°22′35″E
- Length: 45.8 km (28.5 mi)

Basin features
- Progression: Danube→ Black Sea

The Gaißa is a river in Bavaria, southeastern Germany, which is a tributary of the Danube. It flows through the Bavarian Forest from North to South, crossing Aicha vorm Wald and joining the Danube northwest of Passau. The river reaches a length of 19.9 kilometres (12.4 mi); including its source river Große Ohe (not to be confused with the namesake tributary of the Ilz) which is 45.8 kilometres (28.5 mi) long. Due to the nearby motorway, a good deal of dirt was flushed into the water from time to time.

== See also ==
- List of rivers of Bavaria
