= Perschling =

- Municipality
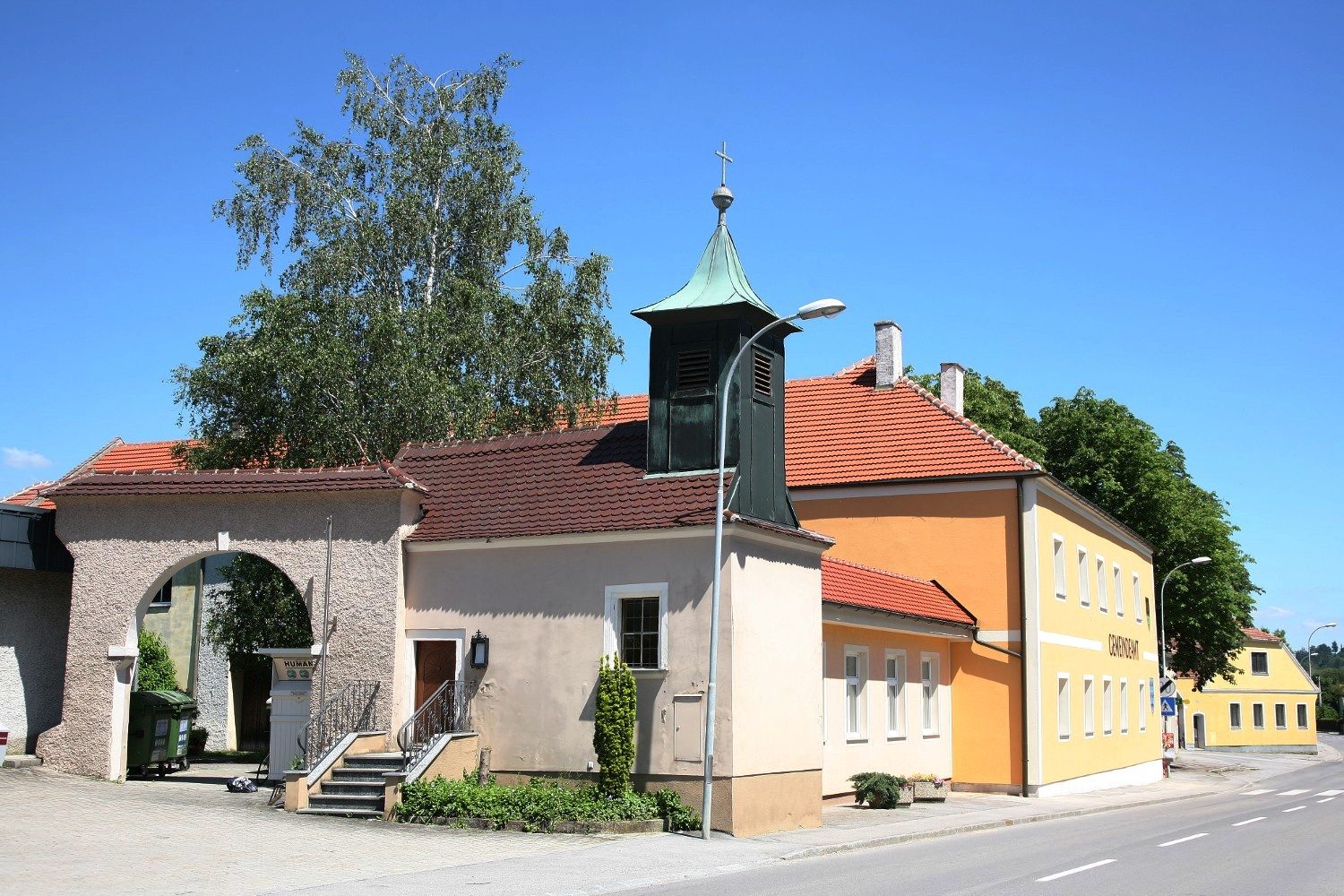
- Town centre

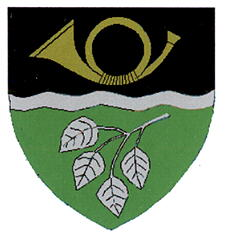
- Coat of arms

- Location within Austria
- Coordinates: 48°16′00″N 15°46′00″E
- Country: Austria
- State: Lower Austria
- District: Sankt Pölten-Land

Government
  - Mayor: Reinhard Breitner (ÖVP)

Area
  - Total: 23.8 km^{2} (9.2 sq mi)
- Elevation: 220 m (720 ft)

Population (2018-01-01)
  - Total: 1,395
  - Density: 58.6/km^{2} (152/sq mi)
- Time zone: UTC+1 (CET)
  - Summer (DST): UTC+2 (CEST)
- Postal code: 3142
- Area code: +43 2784
- Vehicle registration: PL
- Website: perschling.at

Perschling (until 2015 Weißenkirchen an der Perschling) is a municipality in the district of Sankt Pölten-Land in the Austrian state of Lower Austria.

== Population ==
Historical population
Year	Pop.	±%
1951	1,243	—
1961	1,172	−5.7%
1971	1,228	+4.8%
1981	1,170	−4.7%
1991	1,296	+10.8%
2001	1,331	+2.7%
2012	1,315	−1.2%
