= Otterbach (Danube) =

River in Germany

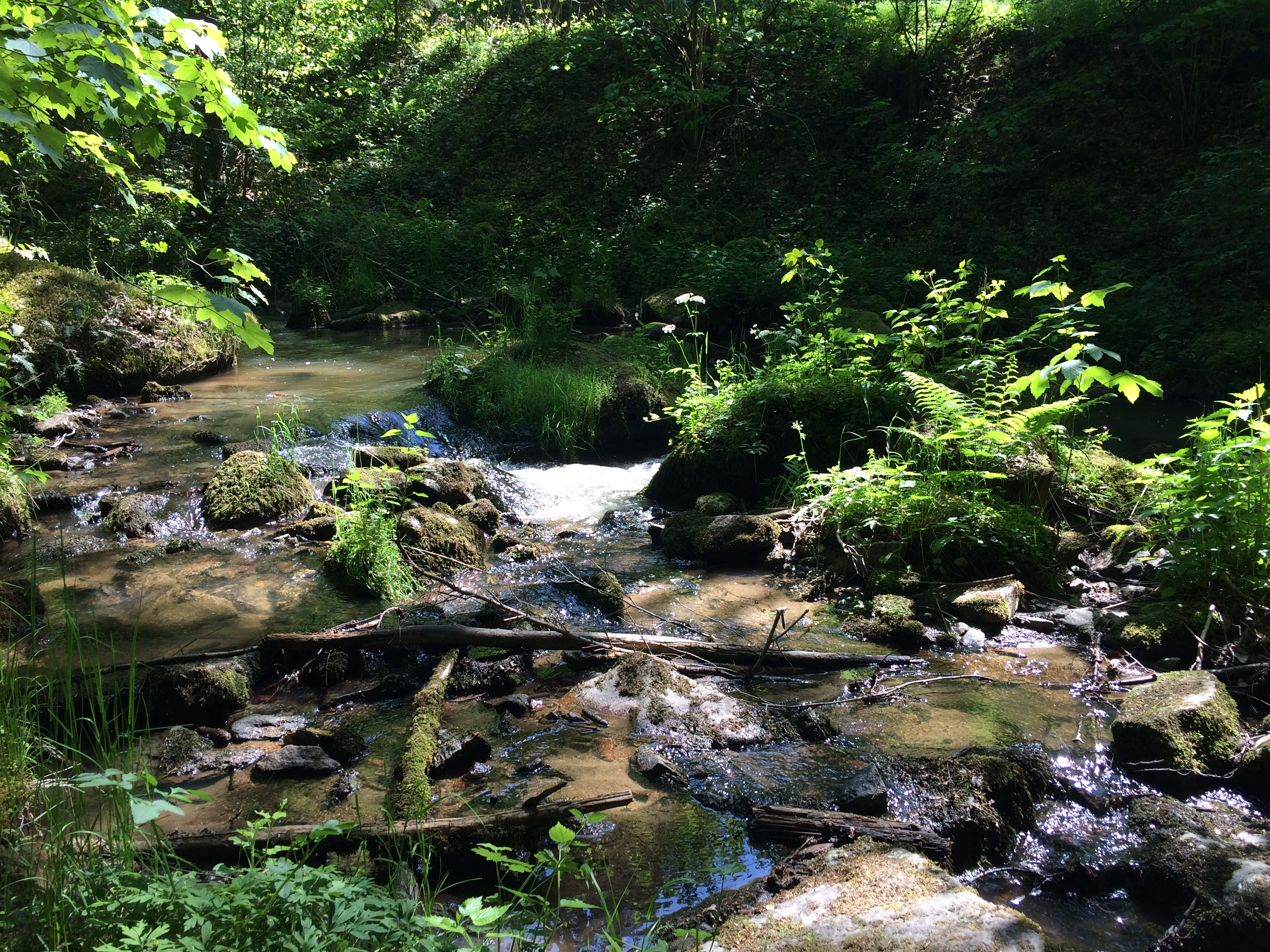
- The Otterbach near Donaustauf

Location
- Country: Germany
- State: Bavaria

Physical characteristics
- Mouth
  - location: Danube
  - coordinates: 49.0257°N 12.2382°E
- Length: 22.5 km (14.0 mi)

Basin features
- Progression: Danube→ Black Sea

Otterbach (German pronunciation: [ˈɔtɐbax]) is a river of Bavaria, Germany. It is a left tributary of the Danube near Donaustauf.

== See also ==
- List of rivers of Bavaria
