= Peceneaga (Danube) =

Peceneaga Aiorman
- Location within Romania

Location
- Country: Romania
- Counties: Tulcea County
- Villages: Dorobanțu, Peceneaga

Physical characteristics
- Mouth: Lake Peceneaga
  - location: Peceneaga
  - coordinates: 45.0087°N 28.1635°E
- Length: 19 km (12 mi)

Basin features
- Progression: Lake Peceneaga→ Danube→ Black Sea

The Peceneaga (also: Aiorman) is a river in Romania, right tributary of the Danube. It flows into Lake Peceneaga, which is connected with the Danube, in the village Peceneaga. Its length is 19 km (12 mi).
