= Văcăreni =

- Commune
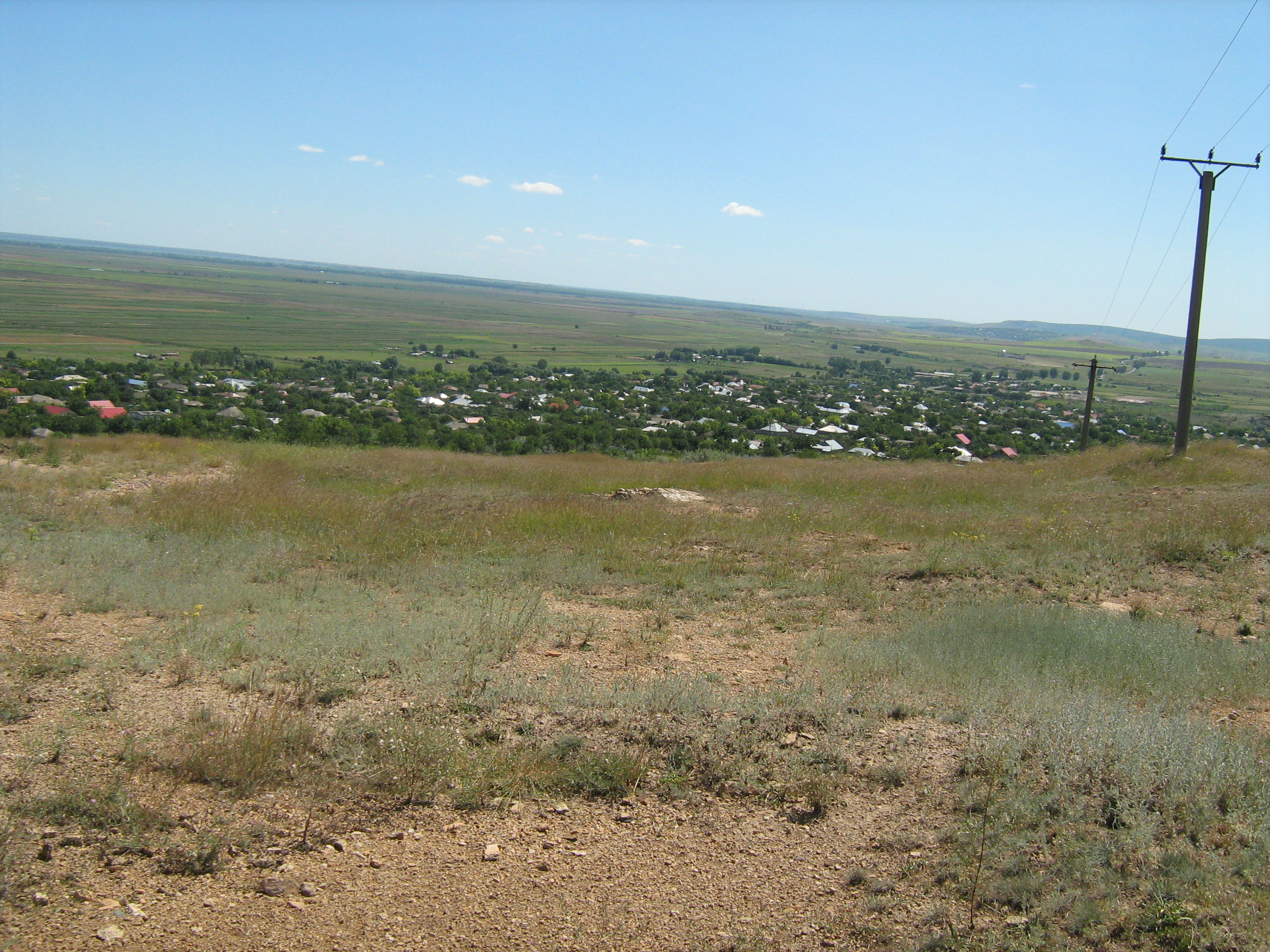

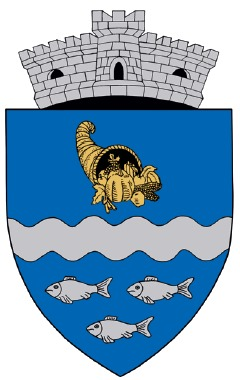
- Coat of arms

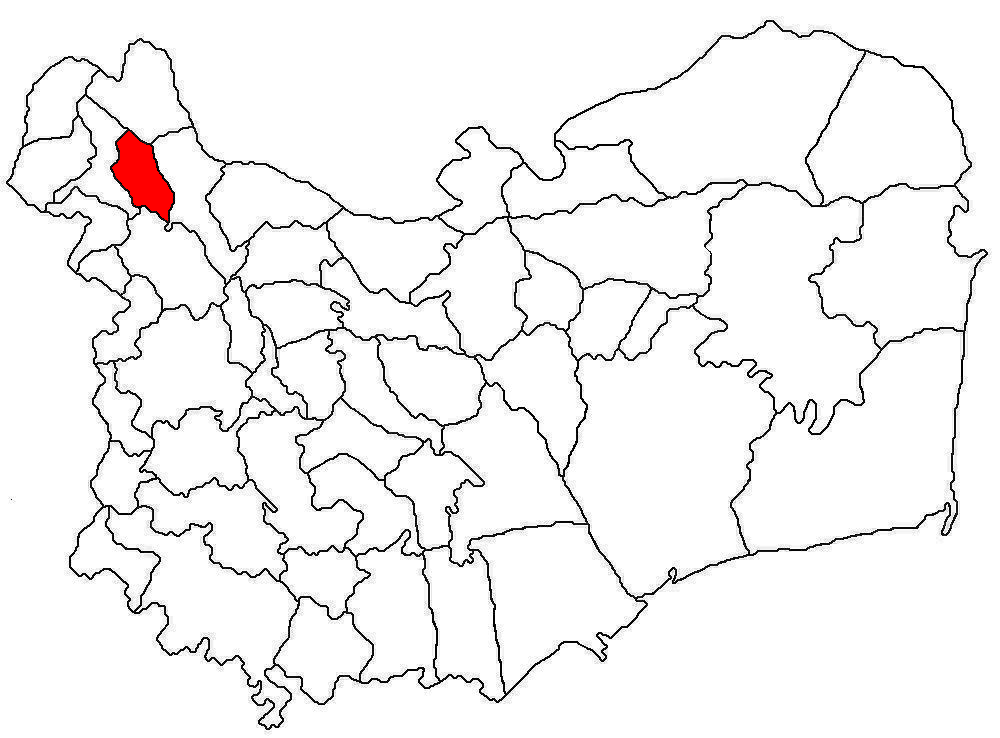
- Location in Tulcea County

- Location in Romania
- Coordinates: 45°19′N 28°12′E
- Country: Romania
- County: Tulcea

Government
  - Mayor (2020–2024): Gică Manolachi (PNL)
- Area: 53.27 km^{2} (20.57 sq mi)
- Elevation: 18 m (59 ft)
- Population (2021-12-01): 1,956
  - Density: 36.72/km^{2} (95.10/sq mi)
- Time zone: UTC+02:00 (EET)
  - Summer (DST): UTC+03:00 (EEST)
- Postal code: 827125
- Area code: +40 x40
- Vehicle reg.: TL
- Website: www.comunavacareni.ro

Văcăreni is a commune in Tulcea County, Northern Dobruja, Romania. It is composed of a single village, Văcăreni. This belonged to Luncavița Commune until 2003, when it was split off.

Southwest of Văcăreni, there is a 218 m (715 ft) tall guyed mast for FM-/TV-broadcasting and a wind farm is planned.

Historical population
Year	Pop.	±%
2002	2,357	—
2011	2,201	−6.6%
2021	1,956	−11.1%
Source: Census data
