= Bahna =

- Commune
- Location in Neamț County

- Location in Romania
- Coordinates: 46°47′N 26°47′E
- Country: Romania
- County: Neamț

Government
  - Mayor (2020–2024): Gheorghe Patrașcu (PNL)
- Area: 57.2 km^{2} (22.1 sq mi)
- Elevation: 302 m (991 ft)
- Population (2021-12-01): 2,923
  - Density: 51.1/km^{2} (132/sq mi)
- Time zone: UTC+02:00 (EET)
  - Summer (DST): UTC+03:00 (EEST)
- Postal code: 617015
- Area code: +40 233
- Vehicle reg.: NT
- Website: bahna.ro

Bahna is a commune in Neamț County, Western Moldavia, Romania. It is composed of eight villages: Arămești, Bahna, Băhnișoara, Broșteni, Izvoare, Liliac, Țuțcanii din Deal, and Țuțcanii din Vale.

Historical population
Year	Pop.	±%
1992	3,718	—
2002	3,723	+0.1%
2011	3,174	−14.7%
2021	2,923	−7.9%
Source: Census data

== Natives ==
- Conon Arămescu-Donici (1837–1922), Metropolitan-Primate of the Romanian Orthodox Church
- Constantin Schifirneț (born 1945), sociologist and historian of philosophy
