= Horia, Constanța =

Horia
- Commune
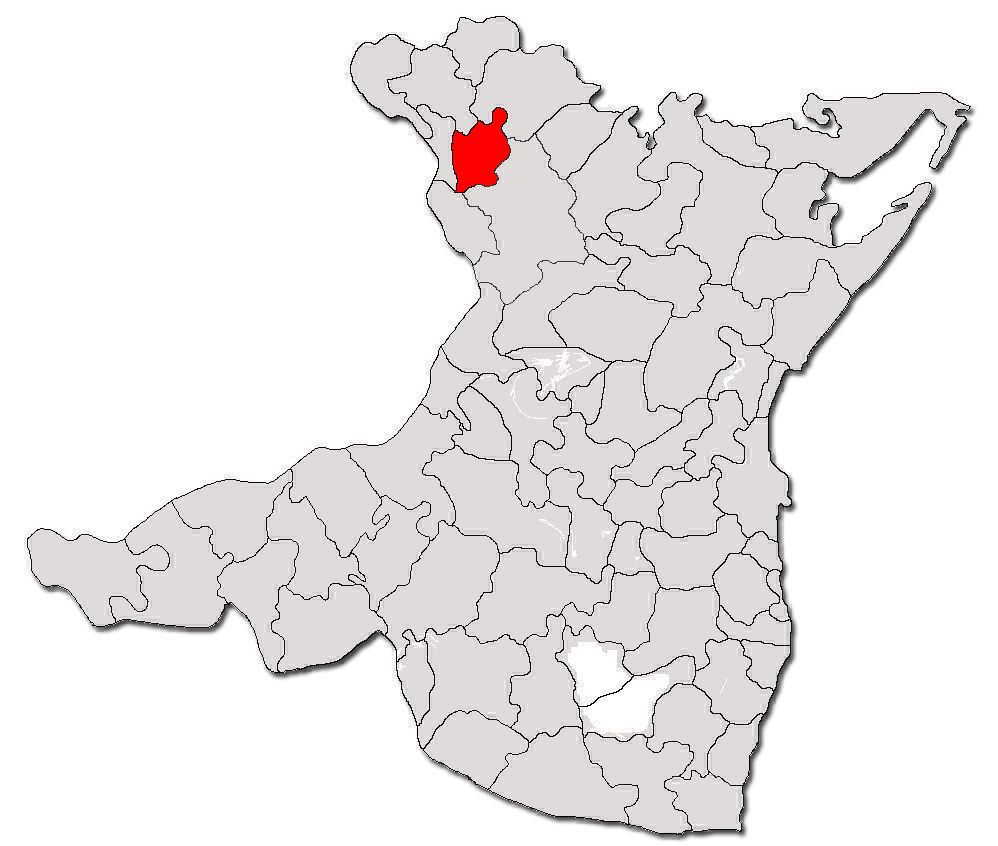
- Location in Constanța County

- Location in Romania
- Coordinates: 44°38′N 28°7′E
- Country: Romania
- County: Constanța
- Subdivisions: Horia, Cloșca, Tichilești

Government
  - Mayor (2020–2024): Nicolae Ioniță (PNL)
- Area: 58.69 km^{2} (22.66 sq mi)
- Population (2021-12-01): 942
  - Density: 16.1/km^{2} (41.6/sq mi)
- Time zone: UTC+02:00 (EET)
  - Summer (DST): UTC+03:00 (EEST)
- Vehicle reg.: CT
- Website: www.primariahoriaconstanta.ro

Horia (Romanian pronunciation: [ˈhori.a]) is a commune in Constanța County, Northern Dobruja, Romania.

The commune includes three villages:

- Horia (historical name: Musubei, Turkish: Musubey) - named after Vasile Ursu Nicola, also known as Horea, one of the leaders of the 1784-1785 peasant revolt in Transylvania;
- Cloșca (historical name: Musul) - named after Ion Oargă, also known as Cloșca, one of the leaders of the 1784-1785 peasant revolt in Transylvania;
- Tichilești.

== Demographics ==
At the 2011 census, Horia had 1,072 Romanians (96.1%), 3 others (0.2%).
