= Eșelnița =

- Commune
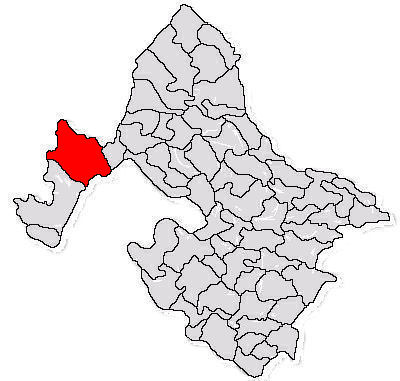
- Location in Mehedinți County

- Location in Romania
- Coordinates: 44°42′N 22°22′E
- Country: Romania
- County: Mehedinți
- Population (2021-12-01): 2,639
- Time zone: EET/EEST (UTC+2/+3)
- Vehicle reg.: MH

Eșelnița (Hungarian: Jeselnica) is a commune located in Mehedinți County, Romania. It is composed of a single village, Eșelnița. It is one of four localities in the county located in the Banat. At the 2011 census, 74% of inhabitants were Romanians, 23.4% Roma and 2% Czechs.

The commune has borne a number of similar names: Jeselnița (1925-1932), Ieșelnița (1932-1950), Eselnița (1950-1956), Ieșelnița (1956-1996) and Eșelnița (since 1996).
