= Peceneaga =

- Commune
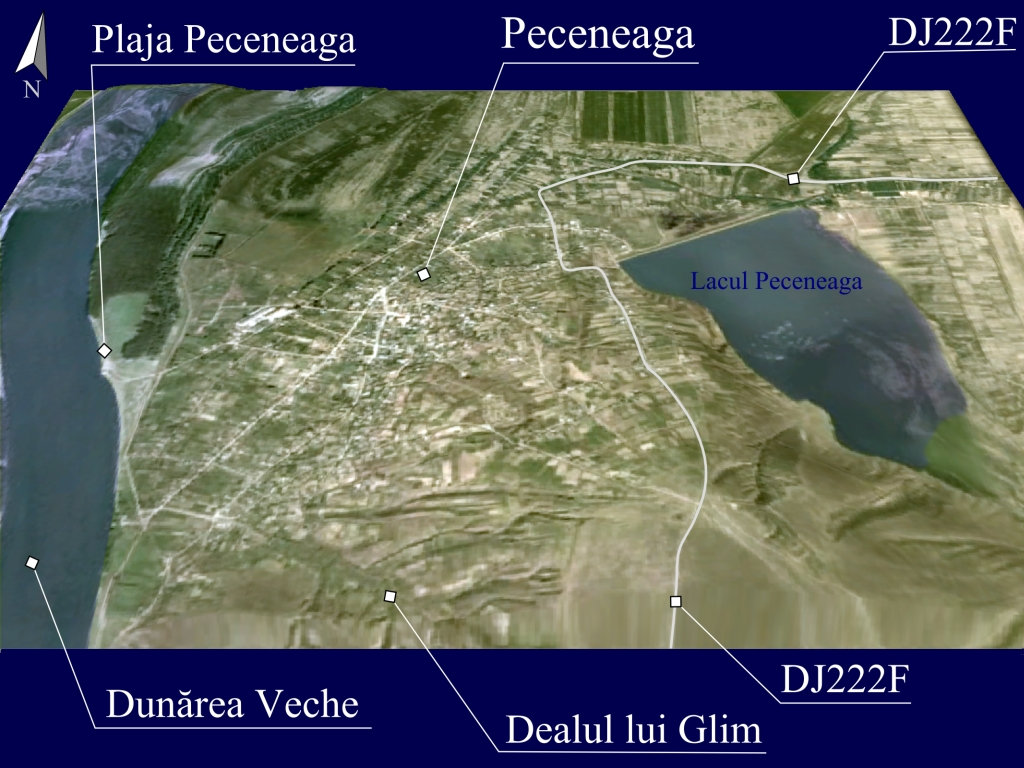

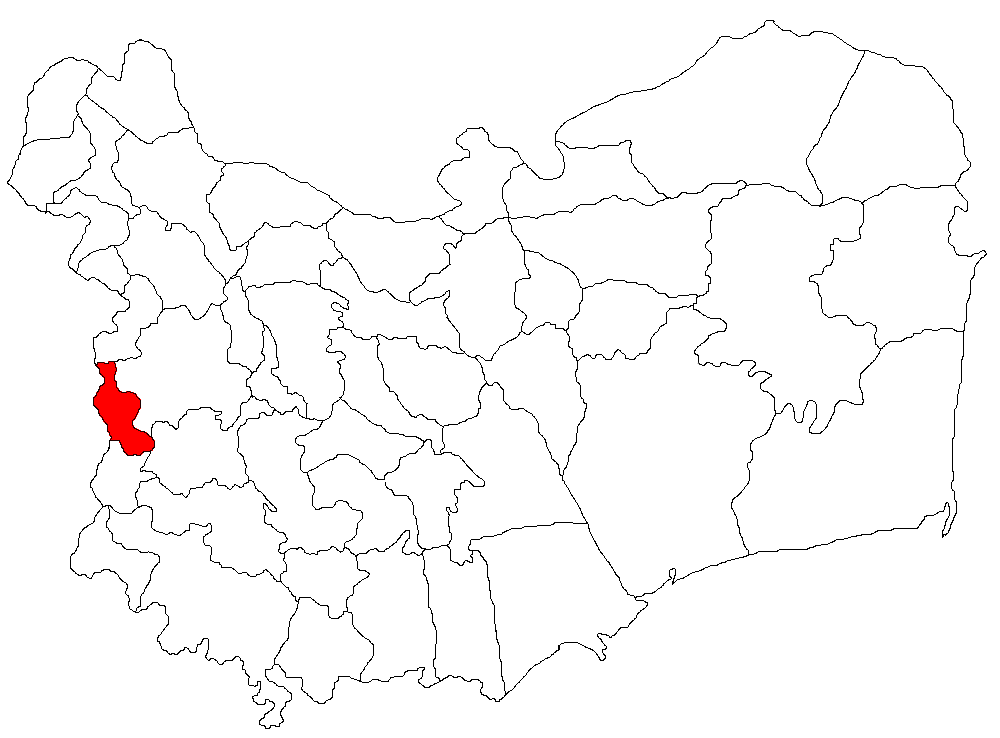
- Location in Tulcea County

- Location in Romania
- Coordinates: 45°01′N 28°08′E
- Country: Romania
- County: Tulcea

Government
  - Mayor (2020–2024): Eugen Matei (PSD)
- Area: 55.51 km^{2} (21.43 sq mi)
- Elevation: 13 m (43 ft)
- Population (2021-12-01): 1,465
  - Density: 26.39/km^{2} (68.35/sq mi)
- Time zone: UTC+02:00 (EET)
  - Summer (DST): UTC+03:00 (EEST)
- Postal code: 827185
- Vehicle reg.: TL
- Website: comunapeceneaga-tl.ro

Peceneaga is a commune in Tulcea County, Northern Dobruja, Romania, on the Danube's east bank. It is composed of a single village, Peceneaga.

According to the 2021 census, the commune has a population 1,465, of which almost all are people of Romanian ethnicity. It is named after the Pechenegs, a semi-nomadic Turkic people who settled in this place in the 10th/11th century.
