= Ilovița =

- Commune
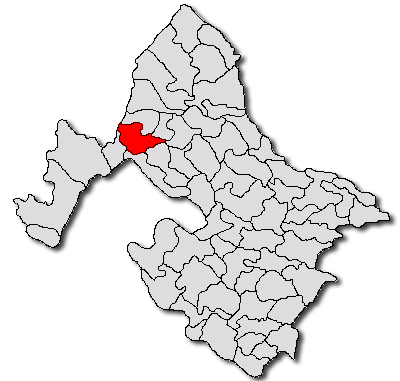
- Location in Mehedinți County

- Location in Romania
- Coordinates: 44°45′N 22°28′E
- Country: Romania
- County: Mehedinți
- Population (2021-12-01): 1,238
- Time zone: EET/EEST (UTC+2/+3)
- Vehicle reg.: MH

Ilovița is a commune located in Mehedinți County, Oltenia, Romania. It is composed of three villages: Bahna, Ilovița and Moisești.
