= Luncavița, Tulcea =

Luncavița
- Commune
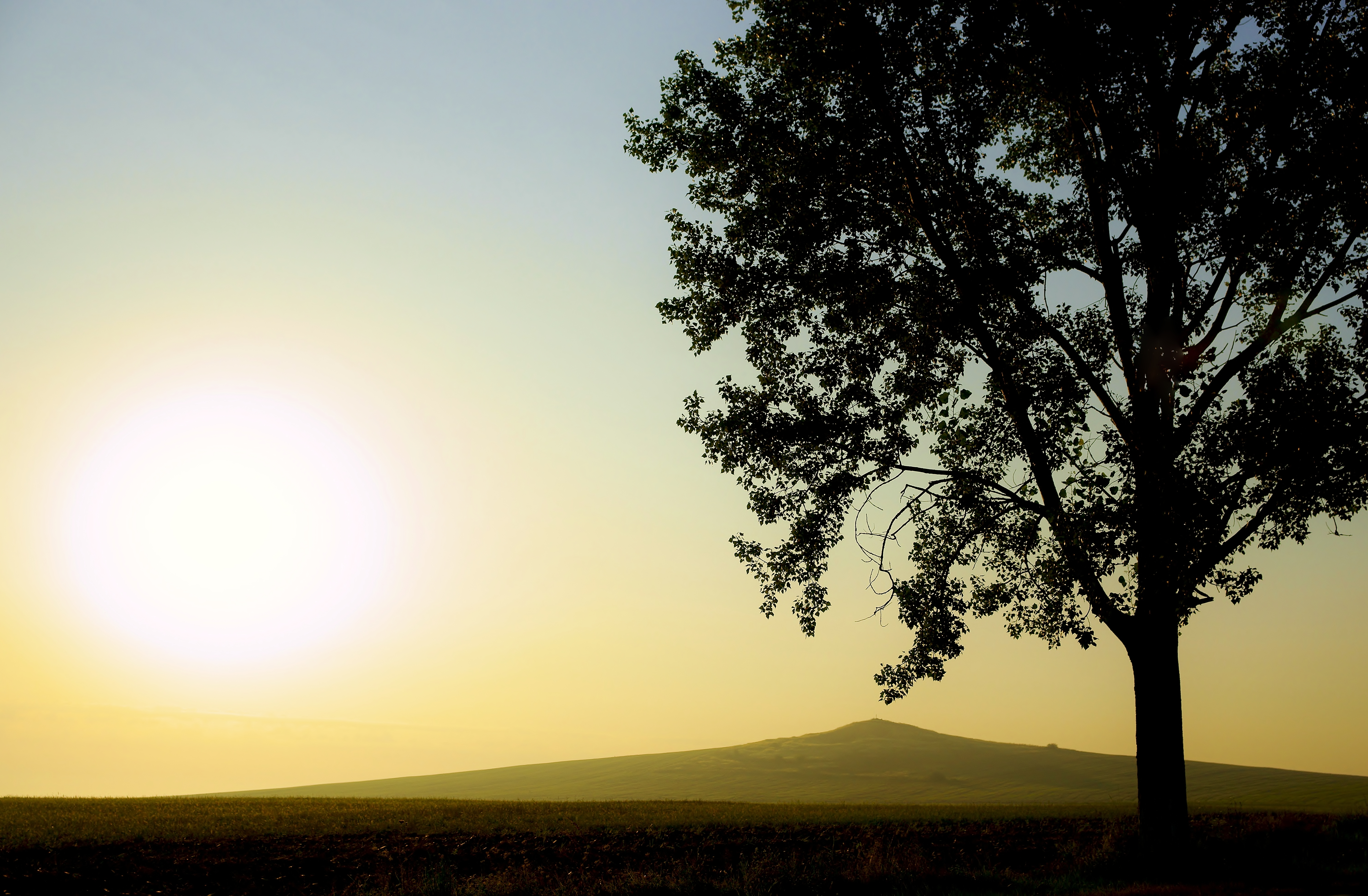

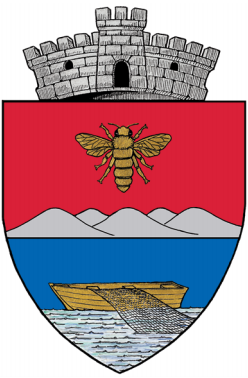
- Coat of arms

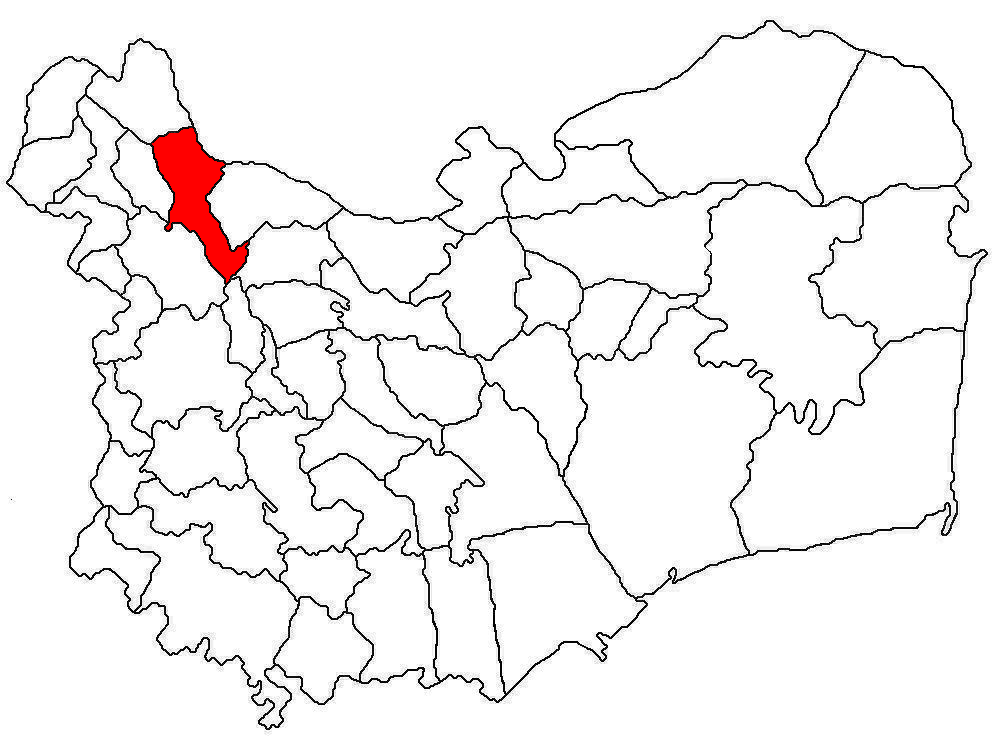
- Location in Tulcea County

- Location in Romania
- Coordinates: 45°17′N 28°16′E
- Country: Romania
- County: Tulcea
- Subdivisions: Luncavița, Rachelu

Government
  - Mayor (2024–2028): Aurel Iorga (PSD)
- Area: 113.87 km^{2} (43.97 sq mi)
- Elevation: 20 m (66 ft)
- Population (2021-12-01): 3,536
  - Density: 31.05/km^{2} (80.43/sq mi)
- Time zone: UTC+02:00 (EET)
  - Summer (DST): UTC+03:00 (EEST)
- Postal code: 827120
- Area code: +40 x40
- Vehicle reg.: TL
- Website: www.comunaluncavita.ro

Luncavița is a commune in Tulcea County, Northern Dobruja, Romania. It is composed of two villages, Luncavița and Rachelu. It also included the village of Văcăreni until 2003, when it was split off to form Văcăreni Commune.
