= Golubac =

Golubac Голубац (Serbian)
- Village and municipality
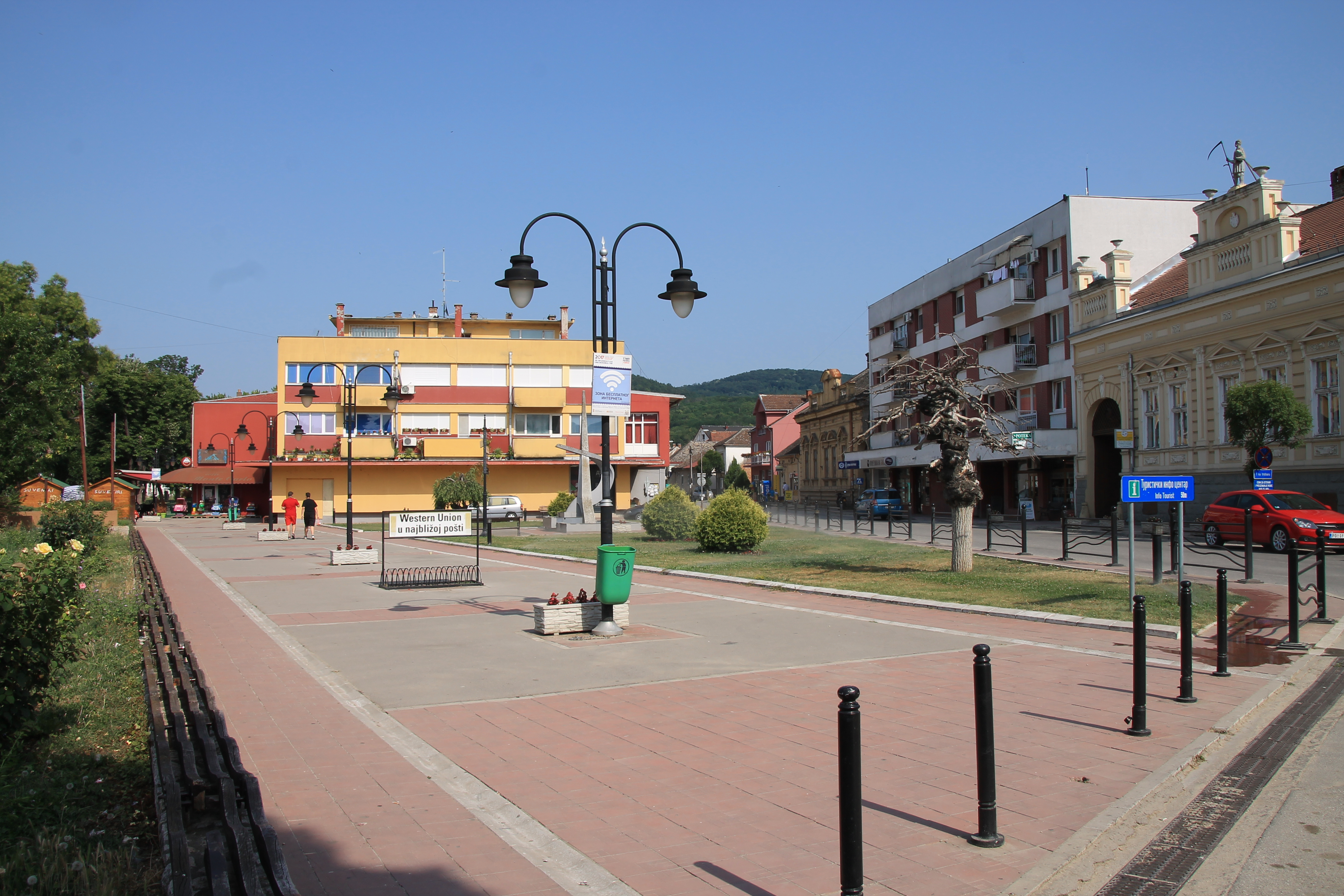
- Town Center

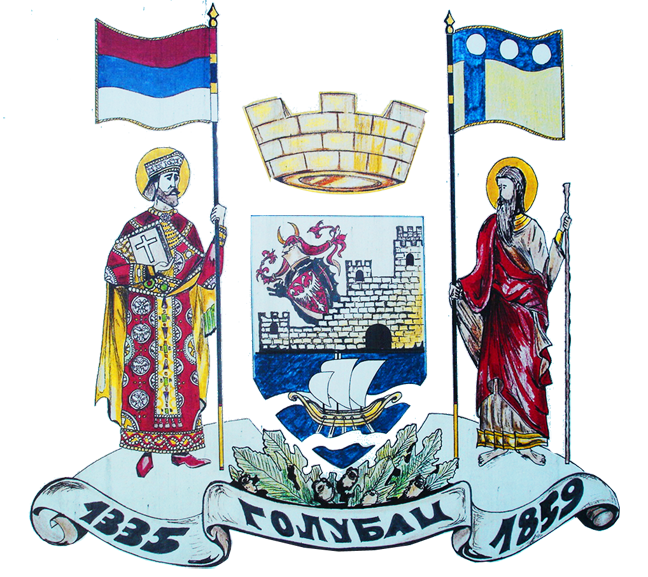
- Flag Coat of arms

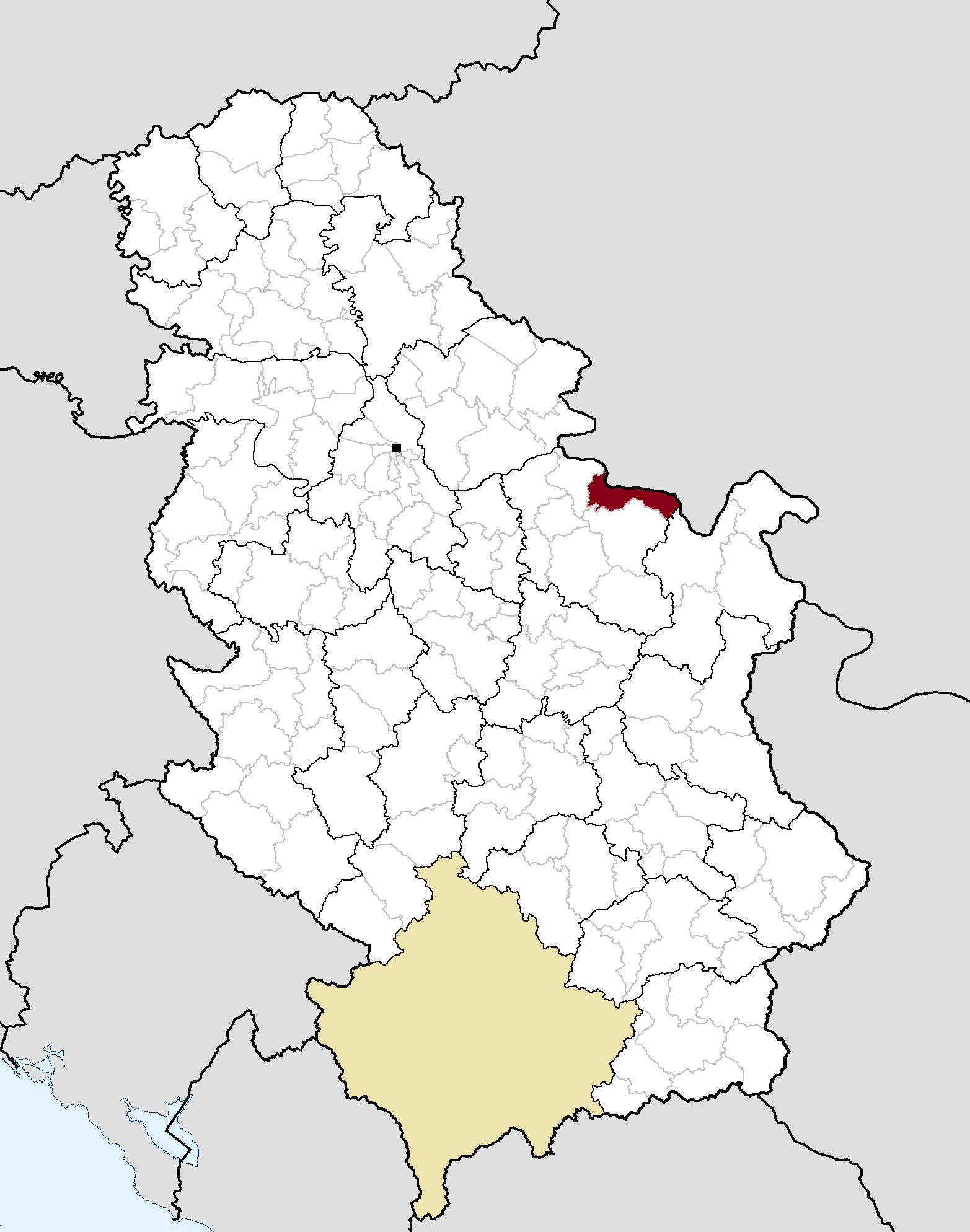
- Location of the municipality of Golubac within Serbia
- Coordinates: 44°39′N 21°38′E
- Country: Serbia
- Region: Southern and Eastern Serbia
- District: Braničevo
- Settlements: 24

Government
  - Mayor: Nebojša Miović (SNS)

Area
  - Town: 41.74 km^{2} (16.12 sq mi)
  - Municipality: 367.29 km^{2} (141.81 sq mi)
- Elevation: 72 m (236 ft)

Population (2022 census)
  - Town: 1,445
  - Town density: 34.62/km^{2} (89.66/sq mi)
  - Municipality: 6,599
  - Municipality density: 17.97/km^{2} (46.53/sq mi)
- Time zone: UTC+1 (CET)
  - Summer (DST): UTC+2 (CEST)
- Postal code: 12223
- Area code: +381(0)12
- Car plates: PO
- Climate: Cfb
- Website: www.golubac.org.rs

Golubac (Serbian Cyrillic: Голубац, pronounced [ɡǒlubats]; Romanian: Golumbac) is a village and municipality located in the Braničevo District of eastern Serbia. Situated on the right side of the Danube river, it is bordered by Romania to the east, Veliko Gradište to the west and Kučevo to the south. The population of the village is 1,445 and the population of the municipality is 6,599. Due to many nearby archaeological sites and the Đerdap national park, the village is a popular tourist, fishing and sailing destination.

== Name ==
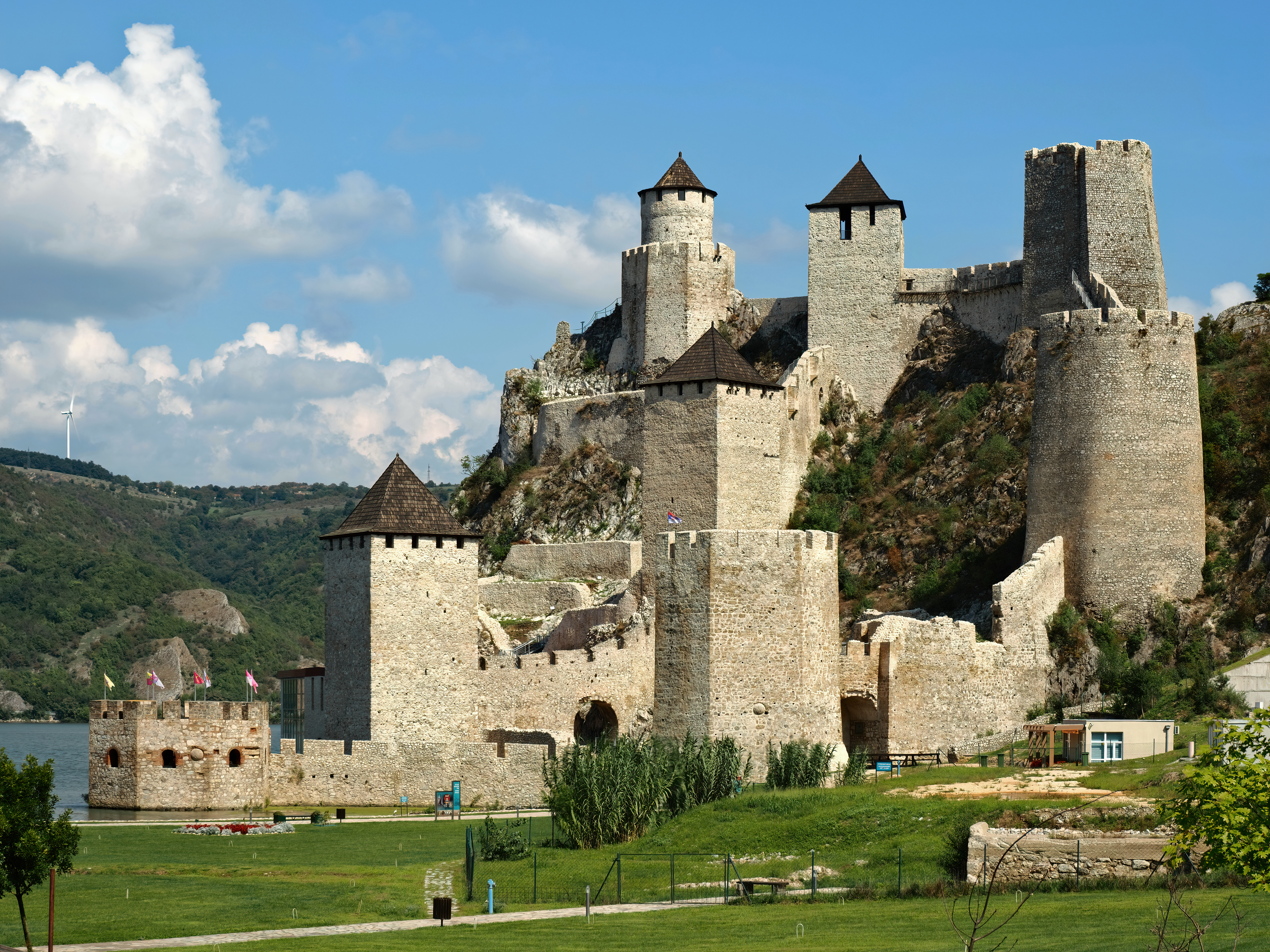
View of Golubac Fortress from Danube

In Serbian, the town is known as Golubac (Голубац), derived from golub ("pigeon" or "dove") and is therefore often translated as "the town of doves." Other names: Romanian: Golubăț (also known as Golumbacu Mare or Columbacu), Hungarian: Galambóc, German: Taubenberg and Turkish: Güvercinlik meaning "dovecote."

Historically, it was known as Columbria in Latin, a contraction of (castrum) Columbaria meaning "city of pigeons" (Latin: Columba, Greek: kòlymbos), and as a city derived from Cuppae during pre-Roman times.

== History ==
It was a stronghold called Cuppae during Roman and Early Byzantine times (1-6th centuries) and turned into a city (Columbria) in 554/5 AD.

Archaeological sites include the remnants of one of Roman Emperor Trajan's tables near Trajan's Bridge, found along his road through the Danube's Iron Gates; and the Roman fortress Diana. Golubac fortress, 4 km downstream, is from the 14th century and also of interest.

Charles I of Hungary conquered the castle in 1334. Lazar of Serbia besieged it and acquired it, possibly in 1382. The Turks occupied it for the first time following the Battle of Kosovo in 1389, lost it to the Hungarian captain Péter Perényi in 1391, then recaptured it later the same year. King Sigismund of Hungary took over the fortress in 1392. When Lazar's son Stefan Lazarević became a Hungarian vassal in 1403–04, he received large possessions from King Sigismund, including the important fortresses of Belgrade and Golubac. A contract between King Sigismund and Stefan in 1426 stipulated that the king was to receive Golubac back on Stefan's death, but its Serbian captain, Jeremija, sold it to the Turks for twelve thousand golden coins. Sigismund besieged the fortress in spring 1428 in response, but the siege was a failure, and the King himself was almost killed by the advancing troops of the Ottoman sultan Murad II. The Polish knight Zawisza Czarny was captured and executed by the Turks. Golubac remained in Ottoman hands until the Peace of Szeged in 1444, when it was ceded to the Serbian despot Đurađ Branković. In 1458, it was reclaimed by the Turks. King Matthias Corvinus of Hungary tried to recapture it, but the siege was interrupted by Hungarian internal conflicts. When Matthias finally succeeded in taking over the fortress in 1481, he evacuated it soon thereafter. It remained under Ottoman rule until the 19th century, with few interruptions (notably, Habsburg Austrian rule in 1688–1690). By the 18th century, the civilian settlement associated with the fortress was described as a prosperous town.

Modern Serbia definitively acquired Golubac from the Ottoman Empire in 1868. From 1929 to 1941, Golubac was part of the Morava Banovina of the Kingdom of Yugoslavia.

== Demographics ==
According to the 2011 census, the municipality of Golubac has a population of 8,331 inhabitants.

Historical population
Year	Pop.	±% p.a.
1948	14,844	—
1953	15,166	+0.43%
1961	15,320	+0.13%
1971	14,178	−0.77%
1981	13,541	−0.46%
1991	12,513	−0.79%
2002	9,913	−2.10%
2011	8,331	−1.91%

=== Ethnic groups ===
The ethnic composition of the municipality:

Ethnic group	Population	%
Serbs	7,576	90.94%
Vlachs	424	5.09%
Romani	52	0.62%
Romanians	47	0.56%
Yugoslavs	13	0.16%
Montenegrins	9	0.11%
Macedonians	7	0.08%
Croats	6	0.07%
Hungarians	5	0.06%
Others	192	2.30%
Total	8,331	

== Economy ==
The following table gives a preview of total number of employed people per their core activity (as of 2017):

Activity	Total
Agriculture, forestry and fishing	47
Mining	45
Processing industry	183
Distribution of power, gas and water	1
Distribution of water and water waste management	36
Construction	39
Wholesale and retail, repair	182
Traffic, storage and communication	30
Hotels and restaurants	90
Media and telecommunications	3
Finance and insurance	5
Property stock and charter	-
Professional, scientific, innovative and technical activities	38
Administrative and other services	39
Administration and social assurance	114
Education	116
Healthcare and social work	70
Art, leisure and recreation	25
Other services	30
Total	1,091

== Tourism ==
The Iron Gate national park is noted for its natural environment and its hunting grounds, as well as its hiking trails. The village's quay along the Danube river is popular for more relaxed hiking.

=== Sailing ===
Golubac has become a well-known sailing site. The Sailing Center of the Sailing Association of Serbia, which the Serbian National Team uses for ground preparations before major sailing events, is located in Golubac. One of the events is a sailing Regatta, which is traditionally held in August. During the summer, the Center holds an Optimist Class sailing camp, where beginners can learn from the best Serbian sailors and their international guests.

== See also ==
- List of places in Serbia
