= Agriș (Luț) =

River in Mureș, Romania

- Location within Romania

Location
- Country: Romania
- Counties: Mureș County
- Villages: Cozma, Tonciu, Filpișu Mare

Physical characteristics
- Mouth: Luț
  - location: Voivodeni
  - coordinates: 46.7135°N 24.6376°E
- Length: 19 km (12 mi)
- Basin size: 56 km^{2} (22 sq mi)

Basin features
- Progression: Luț→ Mureș→ Tisza→ Danube→ Black Sea

The Agriș (Hungarian: Egres-patak) is a right tributary of the river Luț in Romania. It discharges into the Luț in Voivodeni. Its length is 19 km (12 mi) and its basin size is 56 km^{2} (22 sq mi).
