= Luț =

Luț Luc-patak
- Location within Romania

Location
- Country: Romania
- Counties: Bistrița-Năsăud, Mureș
- Communes: Monor, Batoș, Breaza, Voivodeni

Physical characteristics
- Source
  - elevation: 790 m (2,590 ft)
- Mouth: Mureș
  - location: Glodeni
  - coordinates: 46.6561°N 24.6227°E
  - elevation: 329 m (1,079 ft)
- Length: 48 km (30 mi)
- Basin size: 359 km^{2} (139 sq mi)

Basin features
- Progression: Mureș→ Tisza→ Danube→ Black Sea
- Tributaries
  - right: Uila, Fleț, Agriș

The Luț (Hungarian: Luc-patak) is a right tributary of the river Mureș in Transylvania, Romania. It discharges into the Mureș near Glodeni. Its length is 48 km (30 mi) and its basin size is 359 km^{2} (139 sq mi). It passes through the villages Monor, Batoș, Goreni, Breaza and Voivodeni. Its main tributaries are, from source to mouth:

- Căpâlna (left)
- Uila (right)
- Săcalul (left)
- Fleț (right)
- Agriș (right)
