= Fleț =

- Location within Romania

Location
- Country: Romania
- Counties: Mureș County

Physical characteristics
- Mouth: Luț
  - location: Breaza
  - coordinates: 46.7680°N 24.6422°E
- Length: 20 km (12 mi)
- Basin size: 128 km^{2} (49 sq mi)

Basin features
- Progression: Luț→ Mureș→ Tisza→ Danube→ Black Sea
- Tributaries
  - right: Băița

The Fleț is a right tributary of the river Luț in Romania. It discharges into the Luț in Breaza. Its length is 20 km (12 mi) and its basin size is 128 km^{2} (49 sq mi).
