= Băița (Fleț) =

- Location within Romania

Location
- Country: Romania
- Counties: Mureș County
- Villages: Băița, Frunzeni

Physical characteristics
- Mouth: Fleț
  - coordinates: 46.7968°N 24.6369°E
- Length: 14 km (8.7 mi)
- Basin size: 61 km^{2} (24 sq mi)

Basin features
- Progression: Fleț→ Luț→ Mureș→ Tisza→ Danube→ Black Sea

The Băița is a right tributary of the river Fleț in Romania. It discharges into the Fleț near Sântu. Its length is 14 km (8.7 mi) and its basin size is 61 km^{2} (24 sq mi).
