= Uila =

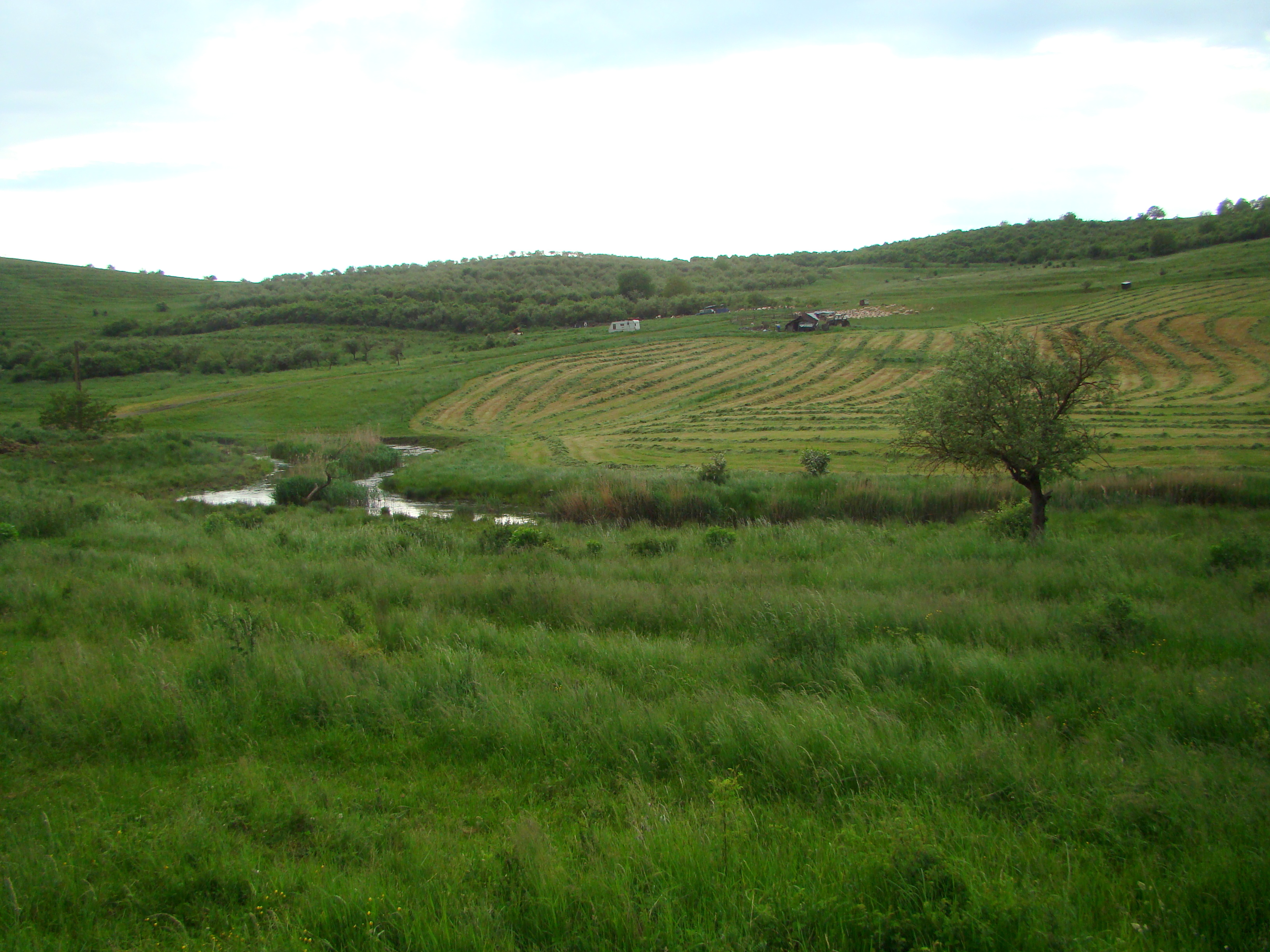

- Location within Romania

Location
- Country: Romania
- Counties: Mureș County
- Villages: Uila, Goreni

Physical characteristics
- Mouth: Luț
  - location: Goreni
  - coordinates: 46.8623°N 24.6477°E
- Length: 10 km (6.2 mi)
- Basin size: 23 km^{2} (8.9 sq mi)

Basin features
- Progression: Luț→ Mureș→ Tisza→ Danube→ Black Sea

The Uila is a right tributary of the river Luț in Romania. It discharges into the Luț in Goreni. Its length is 10 km (6.2 mi) and its basin size is 23 km^{2} (8.9 sq mi).
