= Valea Sasului =

Valea Sasului may refer to:

- Valea Sasului, a village in Șona commune, Alba County, Romania
- Valea Sasului, a village in Cozma commune, Mureș County, Romania

== See also ==
- Valea Sasului River (disambiguation)
