= Fărăgău =

- Commune
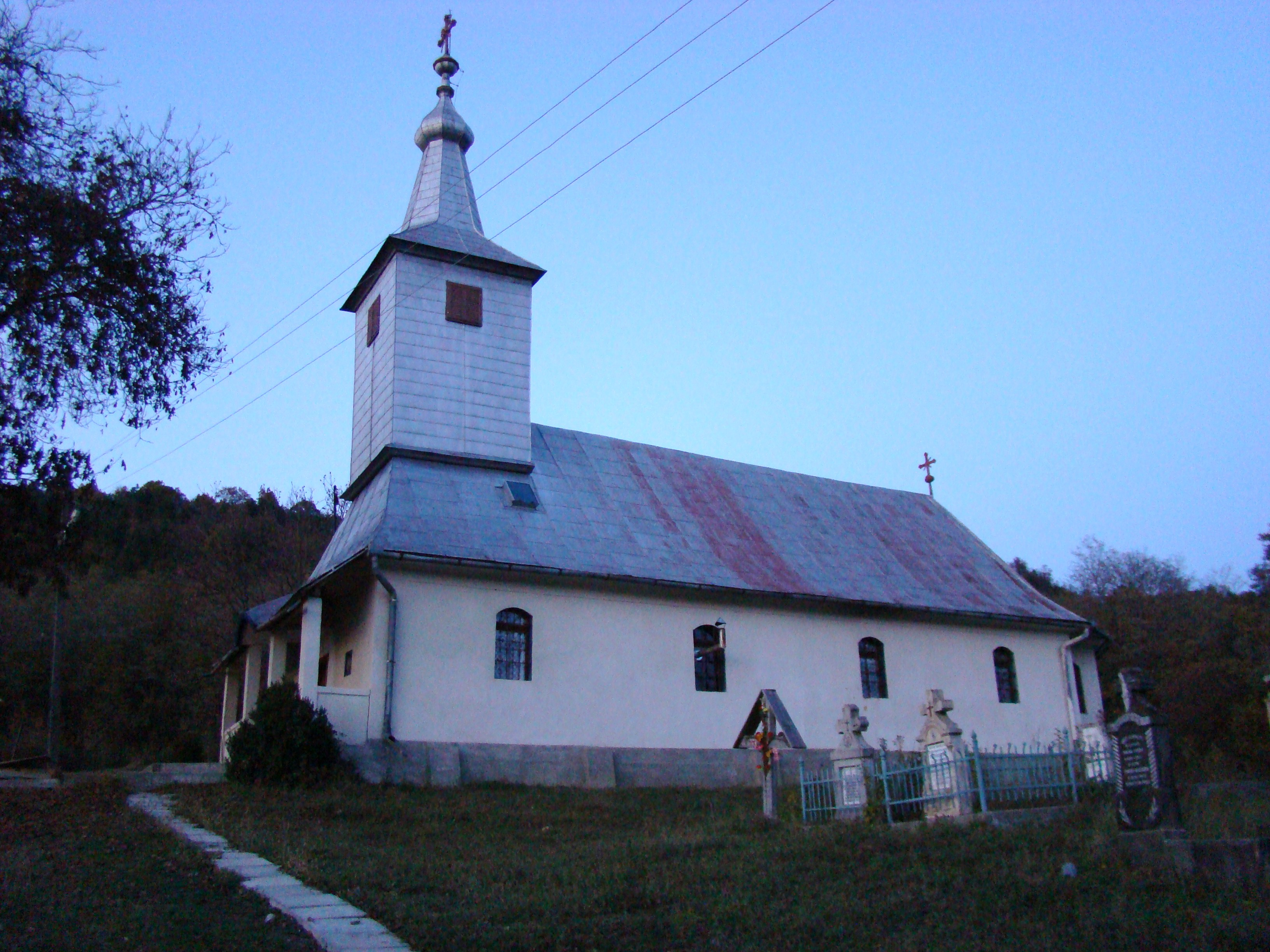
- Wooden church in Poarta

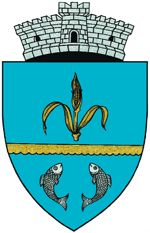
- Coat of arms

- Location in Mureș County

- Location in Romania
- Coordinates: 46°46′N 24°31′E
- Country: Romania
- County: Mureș

Government
  - Mayor (2024–2028): Ioan Milășan (PSD)
- Area: 39.75 km^{2} (15.35 sq mi)
- Elevation: 396 m (1,299 ft)
- Population (2021-12-01): 1,687
  - Density: 42.44/km^{2} (109.9/sq mi)
- Time zone: UTC+02:00 (EET)
  - Summer (DST): UTC+03:00 (EEST)
- Postal code: 547225
- Area code: (+40) 0265
- Vehicle reg.: MS
- Website: comunafaragau.ro

Fărăgău (Hungarian: Faragó, Hungarian pronunciation: [ˈfɒrɒɡoː], German: Hölzeldorf) is a commune in Mureș County, Transylvania, Romania. It is composed of six villages: Fărăgău, Fânațe (Fönácé), Hodaia (Telekytanya), Onuca (Unoka), Poarta (Körtekapu, German Birnthor), and Tonciu (Tancs, German Tesch).

== Geography ==
The commune is situated in the Transylvanian Plain, at an altitude of 396 m (1,299 ft), on the banks of the rivers Șar and Agriș. It is located in the northern part of Mureș County, 18 km (11 mi) west of Reghin and 34 km (21 mi) north of the county seat, Târgu Mureș, on the border with Bistrița-Năsăud County. Fărăgău is crossed by national road DN16, which starts in Reghin and ends in Cluj-Napoca, 85 km (53 mi) to the west.

== Demography ==
Historical population
| Year | Pop. | ±% |
|---|---|---|
| 1850 | 1,791 | — |
| 1880 | 1,644 | −8.2% |
| 1900 | 2,305 | +40.2% |
| 1910 | 2,540 | +10.2% |
| 1930 | 2,664 | +4.9% |
| 1956 | 3,161 | +18.7% |
| 1977 | 2,264 | −28.4% |
| 1992 | 1,774 | −21.6% |
| 2002 | 1,659 | −6.5% |
| 2011 | 1,683 | +1.4% |
| 2021 | 1,687 | +0.2% |
Source: Census data

At the 2021 census, the commune had 1,687 inhabitants; of those, 56.97% were Roma, 28.45% Romanians, and 5.69% Hungarians.

== See also ==
- List of Hungarian exonyms (Mureș County)
