= Johann Böhm (historian) =

Romanian-born German scholar (1929–2024)

Johann Böhm (25 September 1929 in Batoș (Botsch), Mureș County, Romania – 25 December 2024 in Dinklage, Germany) was a historian.

Johann Böhm was a historian and the author of many books about the ethnic Germans in the areas of Hungary, Romania, and the former Yugoslavia in the 20th century around the period of World War II. He was born in 1929, studied History and German literature at Cluj University in the Transylvania area of Romania from 1960 until 1965; and obtained his Doctorate in Philosophy at the University of Cologne in 1984. For his many rich accomplishments he was awarded the Order of Merit of Germany in 2006. He served as editor of the "Halbjahreschrift fur Sudosteuropaische Geschichte" from 1989.

His works bring a critical perspective to the rise of National Socialism among the ethnic Germans of south eastern Europe and the Balkans. His works are replete with detailed scholarship from primary sources.

== Education ==
Böhm studied at the School on the Hill, graduated in 1952, then studied German and history at the University of Cluj (1960–1965). After emigrating to Germany, he studied political science, history and pedagogy at the University of Bochum (1971–1975) and at the University of Cologne, where he received his doctorate with the paper "Nazi Germany and the German Ethnic Group in Romania."

== Professional activity ==
Böhm lived in Dinklage, Germany, and published numerous studies and books on the recent history of Romania. The central theme in the author's works is the Nazi period, the collaborationism of the German minority in Romania with Nazism and the enrolment of ethnic Germans in Waffen-SS.

In 1989, Dr. Johann Böhm began publishing the biannual journal "Halbjahresschrift für südosteuropäische Geschichte, Literatur und Politik" (Half-Yearly Publication of South Eastern European History, Literature and Politics), supported by William Totok, Dieter Schlesak, Klaus Popa and others. William Totok is in charge of the electronic edition of this magazine.

"In addition to (...) awkward revelations, springing from a controversial start, Böhm offers the general public a comprehensive picture of the period 1933-1940", the note on August 5, 1999, the newspaper România liberă in a review of a signed book by Johann Böhm.

In a report on the awarding of the Order of Merit of the Federal Republic of Germany to the historian, the newspaper Ziua of March 15, 2006 noted that "Johann Böhm's work is marked by two crucial moments that led him to deal with the history of the last century. He was born in Romania, where he lived the dictatorial system imposed on the German minority by the National Socialist Party, through the German Ethnic Group in Romania, and secondly, the post-war career of Nazi leaders in the Federal Republic of Germany. In all published works, the historian tried to find an answer to an obsessive question: to what extent was the situation of the German minority in Romania influenced by the evolution of the bad political processes in interwar and Nazi Germany."

Böhm died on 25 December 2024, at the age of 95.

== Works ==
- Das Nationalsozialistische Deutschland und die Deutsche Volksgruppe in Rumänien 1936-1944, Peter Lang, Europäischer Verlag der Wissenschaften, Frankfurt/M 1985, ISBN 3-8204-7561-3;
- Botsch. Ein Gang durch die Geschichte einer Nordsiebenbürgischen Gemeinde, Oswald Hartmann Verlag, Sersheim 1988, ISBN 3-925921-03-6
- Die Ungarndeutschen in der Waffen-SS. Innen- und Außenpolitik als Symptom des Verhältnisses zwischen deutscher Minderheit und ungarischer Regierung, (Ippesheim 1990);
- Die Flucht ins Reich, AGK-Verlag, Ippes-heim 1990, ISBN 3-928389-00-9
- Die Deutschen in Rumänien und die Weimarer Republik 1919-1933, (Ippesheim 1993) ISBN 3-928389-02-5;
- D.Dr. Viktor Glondys, Tagebuch. Aufzeichnungen von 1933 bis 1949 (ed. Johann Böhm/Dieter Braeg), (Dinklage 1997);
- Die Deutschen in Rumänien und das Dritte Reich 1933-1940, (Frankfurt/M, Berlin, Bern, New York, Paris, Wien 1999) ISBN 3-631-34371-X;
- Die Gleichschaltung der Deutschen Volksgruppe in Rumänien und das 'Dritte Reich'. 1941-1944, (Frankfurt/M, Berlin, Bern, New York, Paris, Wien 2003);
- Hitlers Vasallen der Deutschen Volksgruppe in Rumänien vor und nach 1945, (Frankfurt am Main 2006) ISBN 3-631-55767-1;
- Hakenkreuz und rote Fahne. Erinnerungen eines Siebenbürger Deutsche aus zwei Diktaturen. Vechtaer-Druckerei und Verlag GmbH & Co. KG 2007, 276 pages, ISBN 978-3-88441-238-1
- Nationalsozialistische Indoktrination der Deutschen in Rumänien 1932-1944. Peter Lang, Internationaler Verlag der Wissenschaften, Frankfurt am Main 2008, ISBN 978-3-631-57031-9.
- Die Deutsche Volksgruppe in Jugoslawien 1918-1941: Innen- und Außenpolitik als Symptome des Verhältnisses zwischen deutscher Minderheit und jugoslawischer Regierung. Frankfurt am Main: Peter Lang/Frankfurt, 2009, ISBN 978-3-631-59557-2.
- Die deutschen Volksgruppen im Unabhängigen Staat Kroatien und im serbischen Banat. Ihr Verhältnis zum Dritten Reich 1941-1944. Peter Lang, Internationaler Verlag der Wissenschaften, Frankfurt am Main, 2012, 530 pages.

== Distinctions ==
- Order of Merit of the Federal Republic of Germany

== See also ==
- Website of the Semiannual Journal of Southeast European History
- Literature by and about Johann Böhm in the German National Library catalogue
- Website of Johann Böhm
- Important dates for Johann Böhm
- Georg Herbstritt: Register for issues 1 to 24 (1989-2012) of the Halbjahresschrift für südosteuropäische Geschichte, Literatur und Politik (PDF; 547 kB)
