= Baita River =

Baita River may refer to any of the following three rivers in Romania:

- Băița (Fleț)
- Băița, a tributary of the Pârâul Galben river
- Băița (Lăpuș)
