= Cozma, Mureș =

Cozma
- Commune
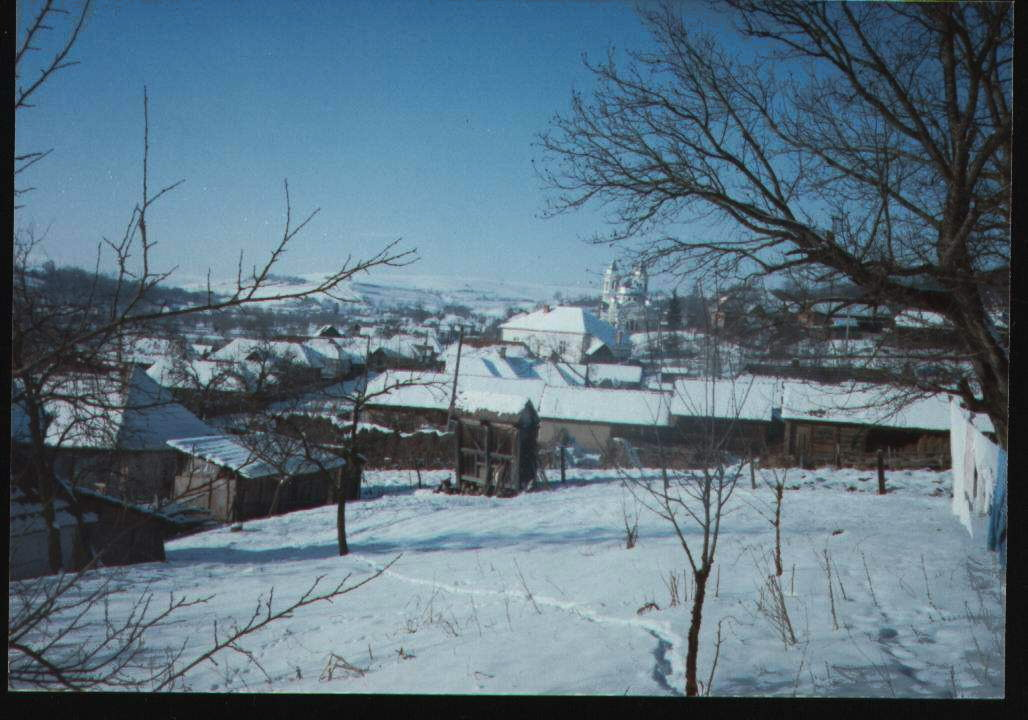

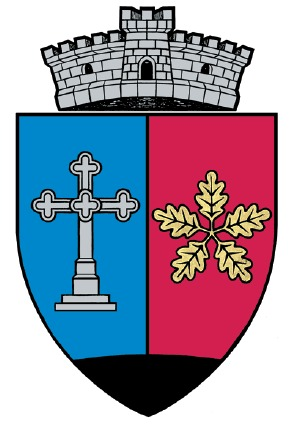
- Coat of arms

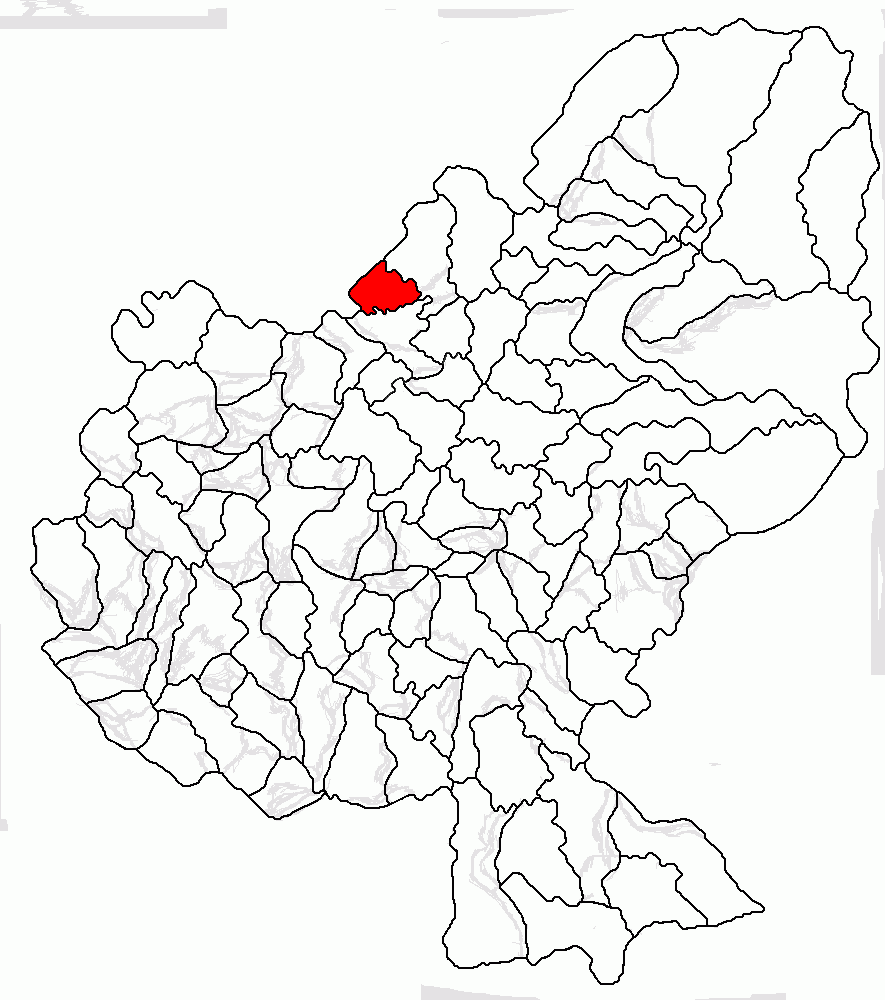
- Location in Mureș County

- Location in Romania
- Coordinates: 46°49′N 24°32′E
- Country: Romania
- County: Mureș

Government
  - Mayor (2020–2024): Petru Ormenișan (PNL)
- Area: 29.62 km^{2} (11.44 sq mi)
- Elevation: 408 m (1,339 ft)
- Population (2021-12-01): 515
  - Density: 17.4/km^{2} (45.0/sq mi)
- Time zone: UTC+02:00 (EET)
  - Summer (DST): UTC+03:00 (EEST)
- Postal code: 547170
- Area code: (+40) 0265
- Vehicle reg.: MS
- Website: primariacozma.ro

Cozma (Hungarian: Kozmatelke, Hungarian pronunciation: [kozmɒtɛlkɛ]) is a commune in Mureș County, Transylvania, Romania. It is composed of five villages: Cozma, Fânațele Socolului (Szénaszokol), Socolu de Câmpie (Mezőszokol), Valea Sasului (Szászvölgye), and Valea Ungurului (Magyarvölgye).

The commune is situated in the Transylvanian Plain, at an altitude of 408 m (1,339 ft), on the banks of the river Agriș. It is located in the northern part of Mureș County, 20 km (12 mi) west of the city of Reghin and about 45 km (28 mi) north of the county seat, Târgu Mureș, on the border with Bistrița-Năsăud County. Cozma is crossed by county road DJ162A, which ends in national road DN16, 7 km (4.3 mi) to the southeast.

Historical population
Year	Pop.	±%
1850	1,504	—
1880	1,557	+3.5%
1900	1,745	+12.1%
1910	1,935	+10.9%
1930	1,918	−0.9%
1956	2,228	+16.2%
1977	1,313	−41.1%
1992	759	−42.2%
2002	644	−15.2%
2011	562	−12.7%
2021	515	−8.4%
Source: Census data

At the 2021 census, the commune had 515 inhabitants; of those, 96.7% were Romanians and 1.36% Hungarians.
