= Lunca, Mureș =

Lunca
- Commune
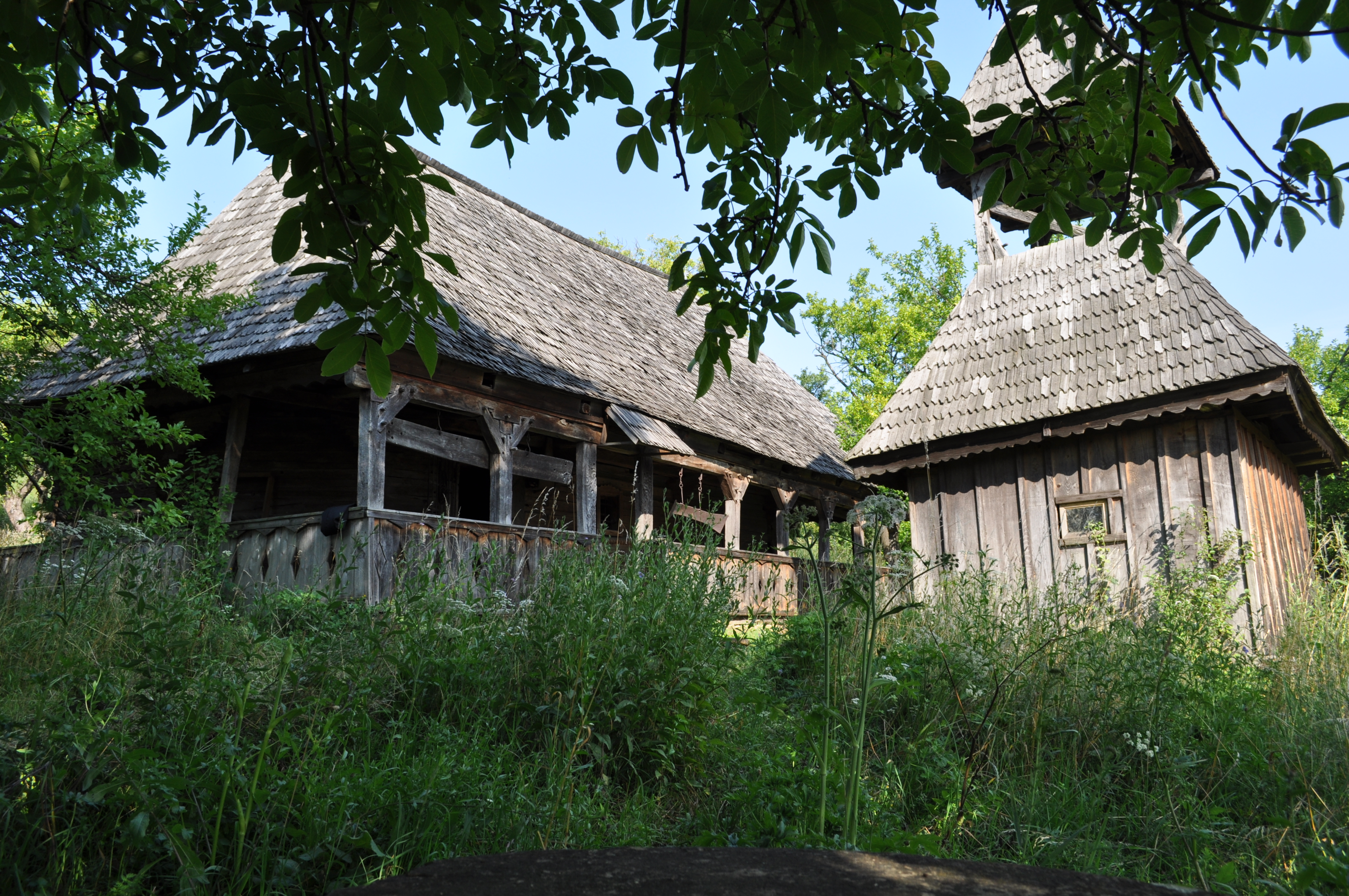
- Wooden church in Băița

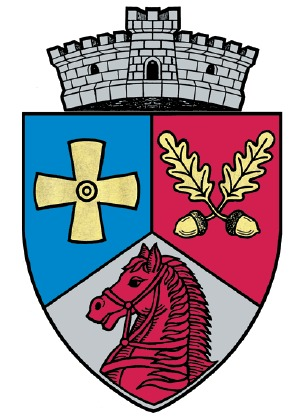
- Coat of arms

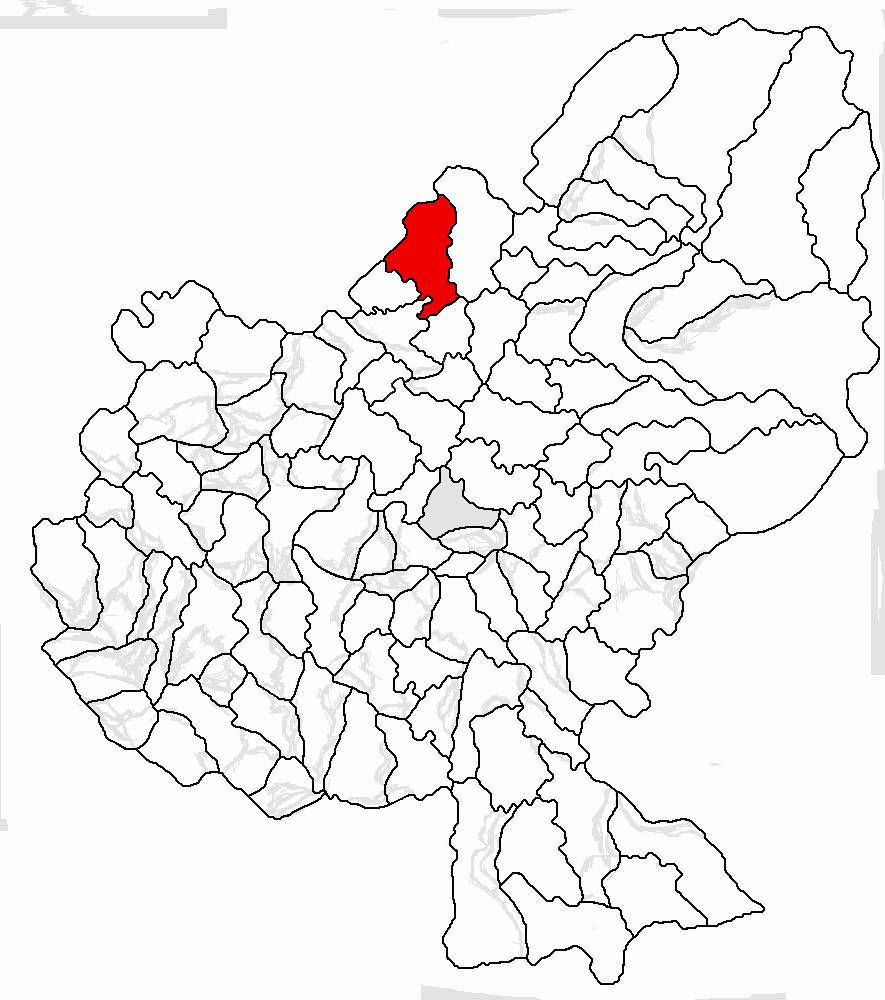
- Location in Mureș County

- Location in Romania
- Coordinates: 46°51′0″N 24°34′30″E
- Country: Romania
- County: Mureș

Government
  - Mayor (2024–2028): Teodor Vultur (PSD)
- Area: 85.20 km^{2} (32.90 sq mi)
- Elevation: 400 m (1,300 ft)
- Population (2021-12-01): 2,078
  - Density: 24.39/km^{2} (63.17/sq mi)
- Time zone: UTC+02:00 (EET)
  - Summer (DST): UTC+03:00 (EEST)
- Postal code: 547375
- Area code: (+40) 0265
- Vehicle reg.: MS
- Website: comunalunca.ro

Lunca (Hungarian: Tekeújfalu; Hungarian pronunciation: [ˈtɛkɛuːjfɒlu]) is a commune in Mureș County, Transylvania, Romania. It is composed of five villages: Băița (Mezőbanyica), Frunzeni (Mezőharasztos), Logig (Szászludvég), Lunca, and Sântu (Mezőszentandrás).

At the 2021 census, the commune had a population of 2,078; of those, 90.66% were Romanians and 1.3% Hungarians.

== See also ==
- List of Hungarian exonyms (Mureș County)
