= Voivodeni =

Voivodeni Vajdaszentivány
- Commune
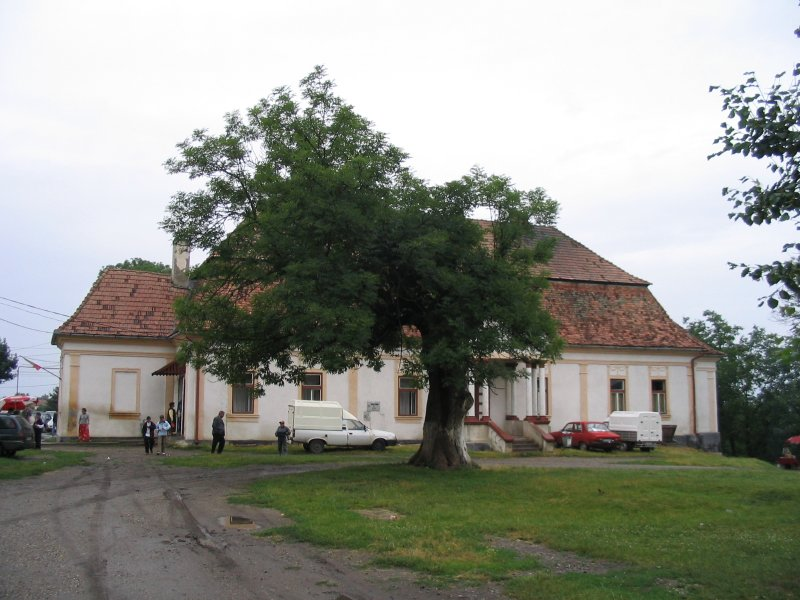
- Zichy Castle

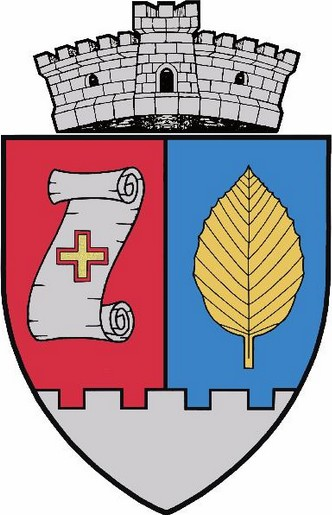
- Coat of arms

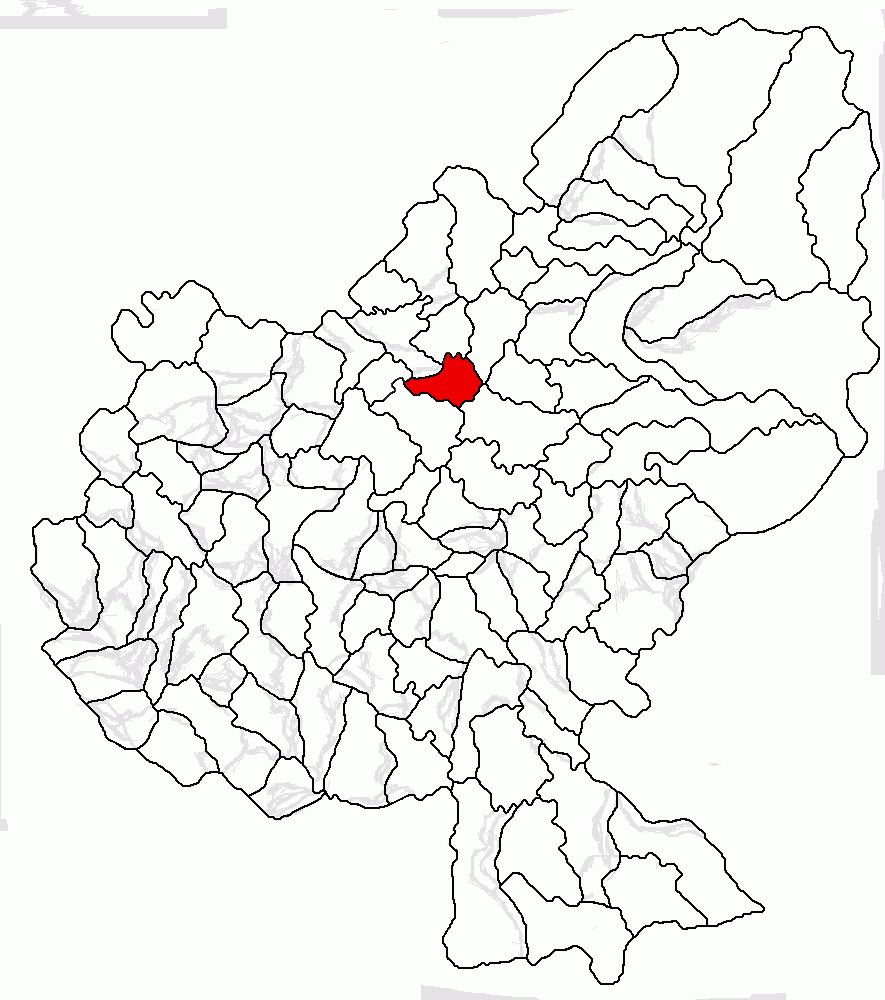
- Location in Mureș County

- Location in Romania
- Coordinates: 46°42′0″N 24°38′0″E
- Country: Romania
- County: Mureș

Government
  - Mayor (2020–2024): Vasile Boer (PSD)
- Area: 34 km^{2} (13 sq mi)
- Elevation: 364 m (1,194 ft)
- Population (2021-12-01): 1,575
  - Density: 46/km^{2} (120/sq mi)
- Time zone: UTC+02:00 (EET)
  - Summer (DST): UTC+03:00 (EEST)
- Postal code: 547650
- Area code: (+40) 0265
- Vehicle reg.: MS
- Website: voivodeni.ro

Voivodeni (also Sânioana or Sântioana; Hungarian: Vajdaszentivány, Szentivány; German: Johannisdorf, Johannesdorf) is a commune in Mureș County, Transylvania, Romania. It is composed of two villages, Toldal (Toldalag) and Voivodeni. The former village is much less populated than the latter.

This commune lies in the Transylvanian Plain and is centrally located in Romania. It is about 174 mi (280 km) north of Bucharest, about 8 mi (13 km) southwest of the city of Reghin, about 14 mi (23 km) north of the county seat of Târgu Mureș, and about 86 mi (138 km) northwest of Brașov. It is also at an average altitude of 1,230 ft (370 m), less than the average height where a landmass is considered a mountain (2,000 feet).

The commune has a hemiboreal climate with the average temperature as 48 °F (9 °C), with the warmest in July at about 70 °F (21 °C) and the coldest in December at about 21 °F (−6 °C). The average rainfall is about 31 inches a year, with about 5 inches in May and about 1.5 inches in February on average.

== History ==
The first mention of the town was in 1332, under the name of Sancto Johanne. Archaeological finds have shown that the area comprising the Voivodendi village was first settled during the Bronze period. Evidence of settlement has been discovered on a hill called Benghát, which stands 374 m (1,227 ft) tall, as well as signs of Roman presence, including a nearby Roman road. In the commune town of Toldal, there are definite traces of Roman settlers, who primarily engaged in agricultural production.

During the Kingdom of Hungary, the commune belonged to the Régen district. It was part of the Székely Land region of the historical Transylvania province. This was kept when the Kingdom was absorbed into the Austrian Empire and the Austro-Hungarian Empire. There was an administrative reorganization of Transylvania, and it was attached to Maros-Torda County.

After the Hungarian–Romanian War of 1918–1919 and the Treaty of Trianon of 1920, the commune became part of the Kingdom of Romania, and was attached to Mureș County. In 1940, the Second Vienna Award granted Northern Transylvania to Hungary and the locality was held by Hungary until 1944. During this time, the small Jewish community in the area was exterminated by the Nazis. After Soviet occupation, the Romanian administration returned, and the village became officially part of Romania in March 1945. Between 1952 and 1960, the commune fell within the Magyar Autonomous Region, between 1960 and 1968 the Mureș-Magyar Autonomous Region. In 1968, the region was abolished, and since then, the commune has been part of Mureș County.

The commune features the Zichy Castle, with relics from the Roman area and Hungarian presence. Notable people who have lived in the commune include politician István Dán and biologist (and geographer) Pál Samu, born on June 28, 1935.

== Demographics ==
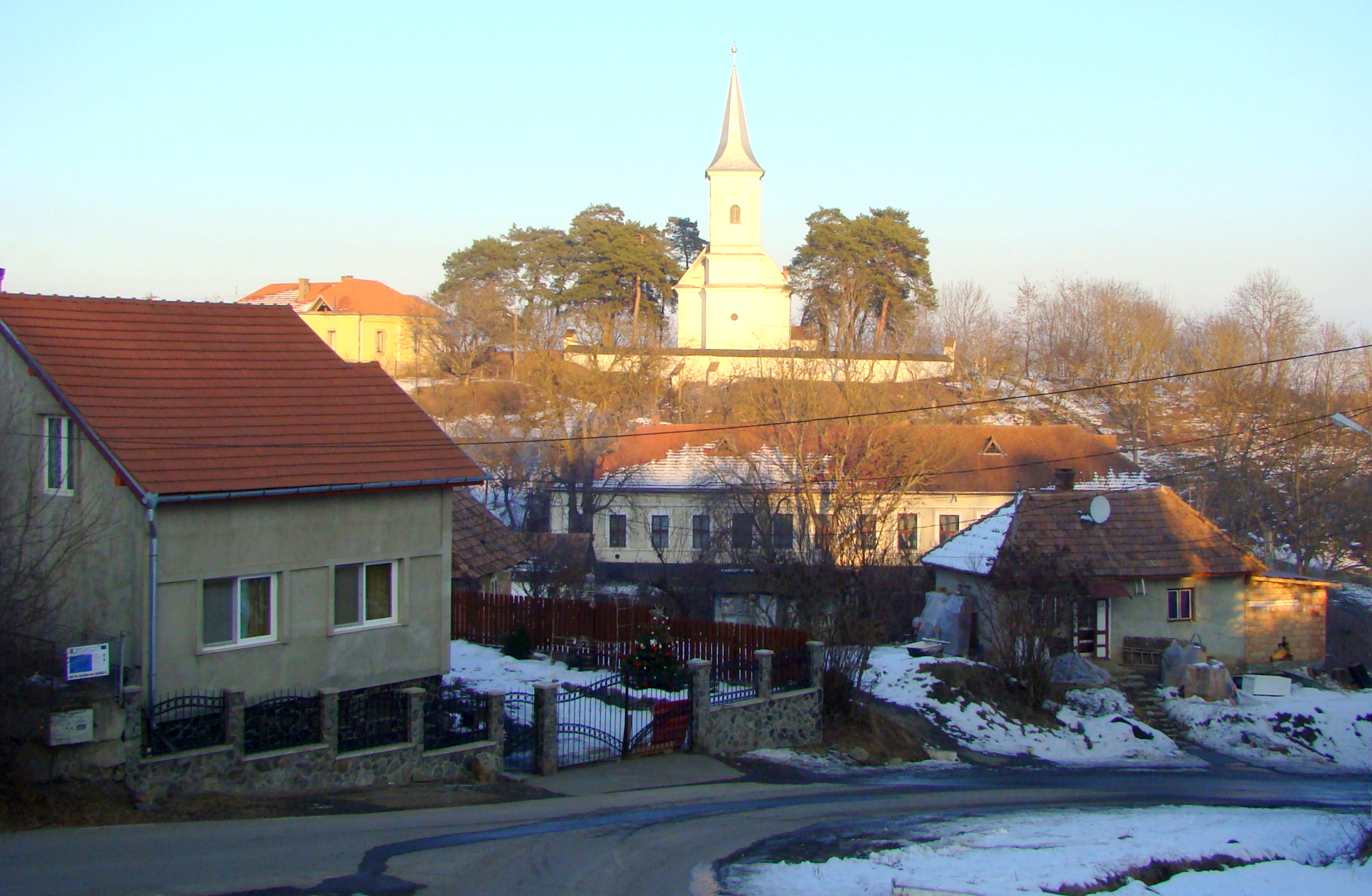
Reformed church in Voivodeni

The highest number of people living in the commune, since recording of population information began in 1850, was in 1956, with a total of 2,849 inhabitants.

According to the 2011 census, the population of the Voivodeni commune was 1,756 inhabitants. This was a decrease from the previous census, in 2002, when 1,957 were living in the commune. Of the inhabitants, about 60% were Székely Hungarians, while the rest were either Romanians (28.4%) or Roma (9.05%), with about 2% having an unknown ethnicity. In terms of religious belief, most were Reformed (about 57%), while the rest were either Orthodox (about 28%), Seventh-Day Adventists (about 4%), Jehovah's Witnesses (3.4%), Roman Catholic (2.5%), or non-religious (1.6%). About 2% of the population had religious beliefs that could not be determined.

At the 2021 census, the commune had a population of 1,575; of those, 55.05% were Hungarians, 28.19% Romanians, 10.98% Roma, and 5.46% of unknown ethnicity.

== Present day ==
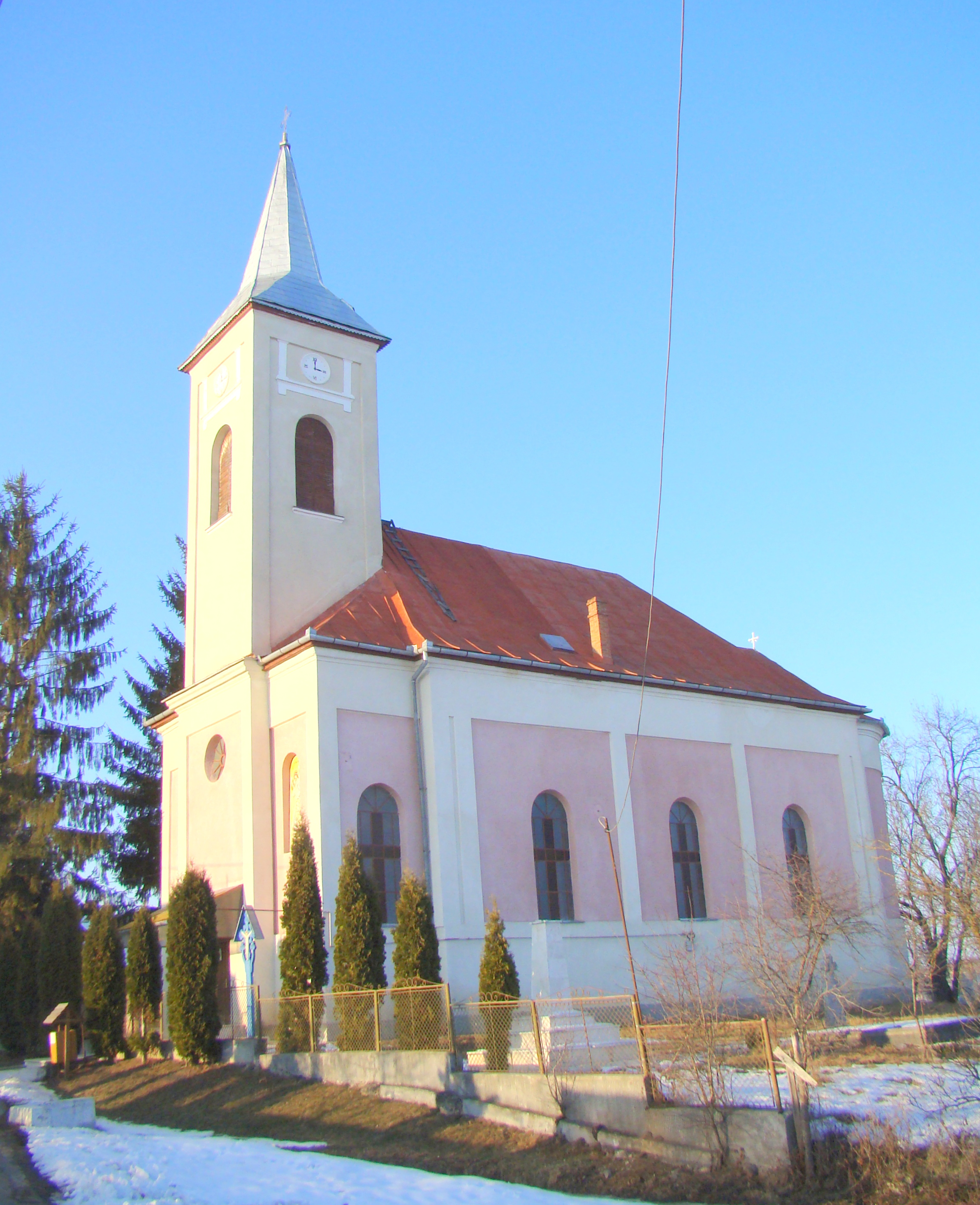
Orthodox church in Voivodeni

The commune of Voivodeni is administered by a mayor and a local council which is composed of 11 councilors. The Mayor is Vasile Boer, from the Social Democratic Party, who was elected in 2012. The local council has the following composition of political parties after local elections in 2016:

- Social Democratic Party (Romania) – 7 seats
- Hungarian Democratic Union of Romania – 3 seats
- Hungarian Civic Party – 1 seat

Dance classes are held in the commune, like other parts of Transylvania, and churches made of wood are still standing. The economy of the town is based on agriculture and livestock. The municipality is also located on the regional road DJ154J Breaza – Glodeni, near the national road DN15 Târgu Mureș – Reghin.

Tourist attractions in the commune include the Reformed-Calvinist Church in the village of Voivodeni, built in the 15th century, and the Zichy Mansion in Vojvodina, constructed in the 18th century, to name two historical monuments. There are also several lakes, like Lacul Sate, where tourists can fish.

== See also ==
- List of Hungarian exonyms (Mureș County)
