= Transylvanian Plain =

Ethnogeographical area in Romania

Coordinates: 46°54′N 24°09′E

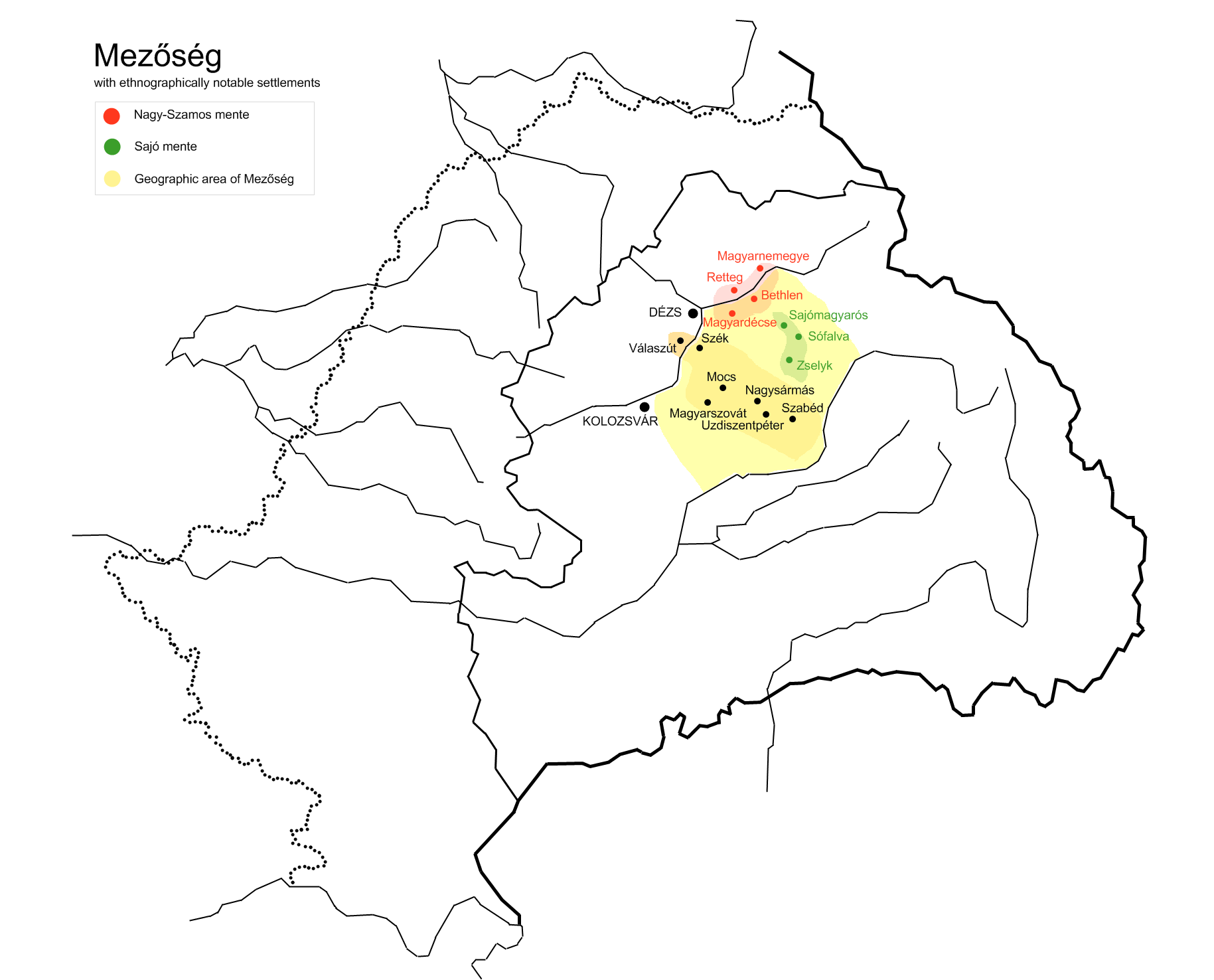
Location of the Transylvanian Plain

The Transylvanian Plain (Romanian: Câmpia Transilvaniei; Hungarian: Mezőség, lit. 'plain area') is an ethnogeographical area in Transylvania, Romania, located between the Someșul Mare and the Someșul Mic rivers to the north and west and the Mureș River to the south and east. It is populated by both ethnic Romanians and ethnic Hungarians.

The Transylvanian Plain can be divided into two parts: a hilly one in the northeast and a flatter one in the south and west.

Important villages in the Transylvanian Plain include Sic (in Hungarian, Szék; a former salt-mining town), Mociu (Mócs), Jucu (Zsuk), Band (Mezőbánd), Suatu (Magyarszovát), and Unguraș (Bálványosváralja).

== Images ==
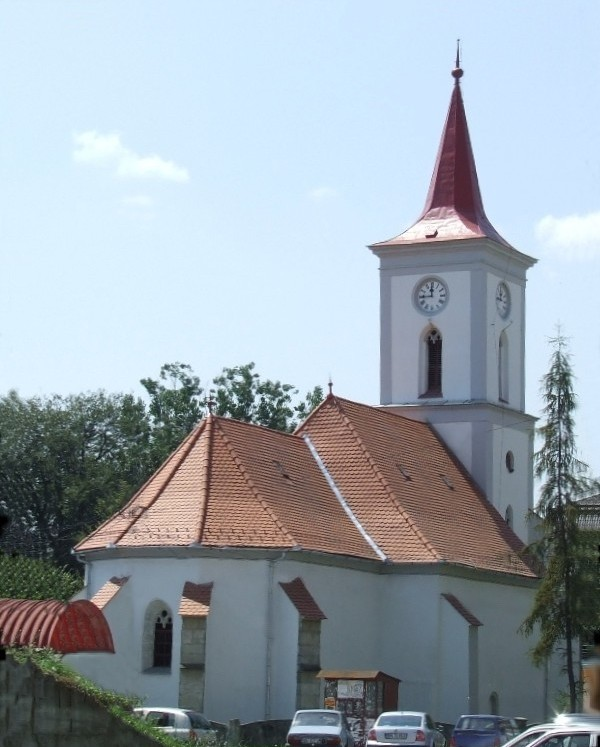
Reformed Church in Beclean

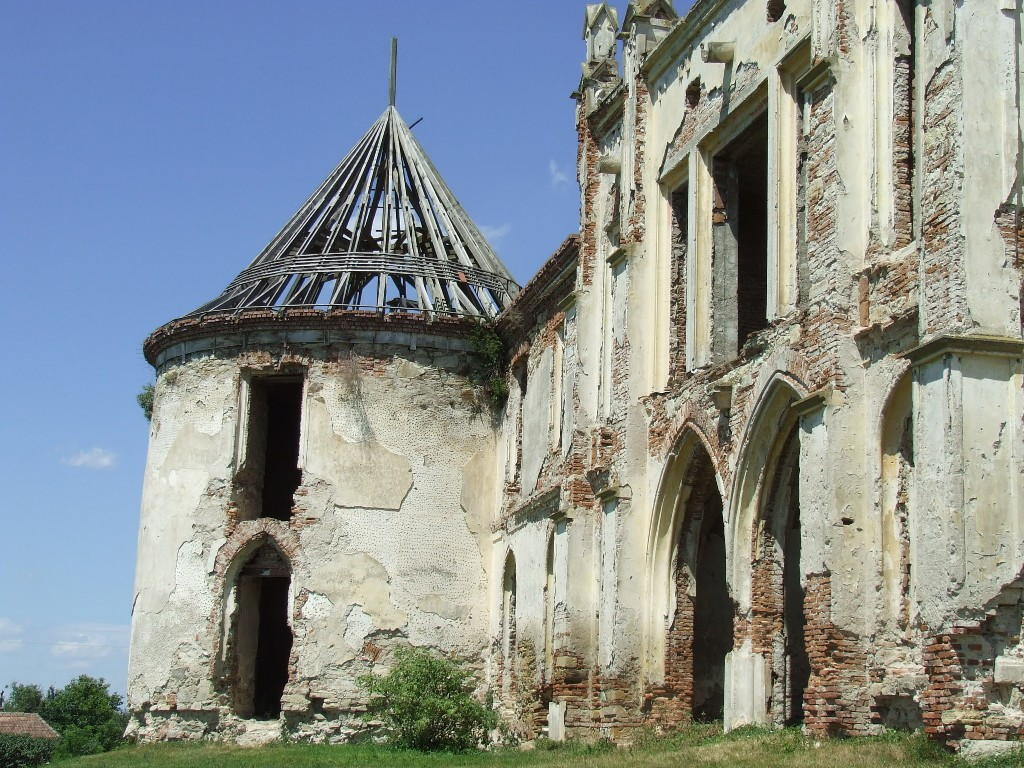
Bonțida Bánffy Castle

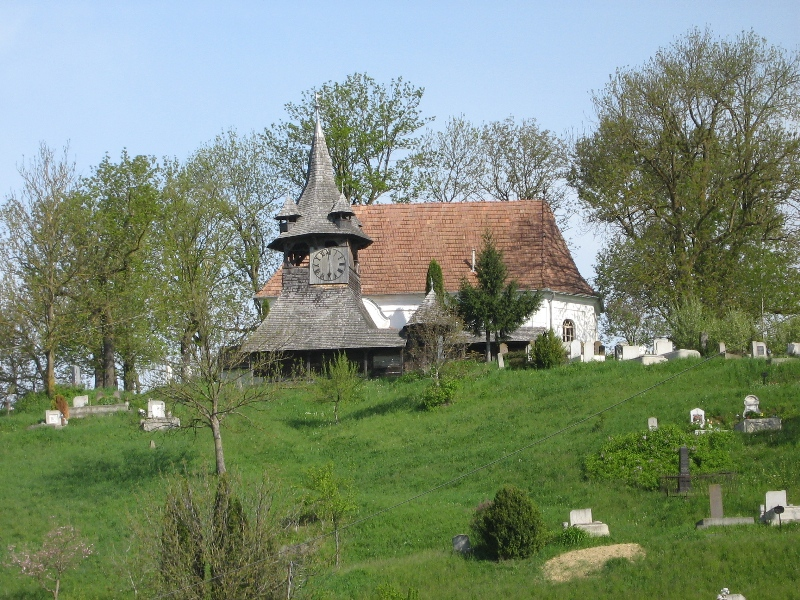
Ceuașu de Câmpie Reformed church and bell tower

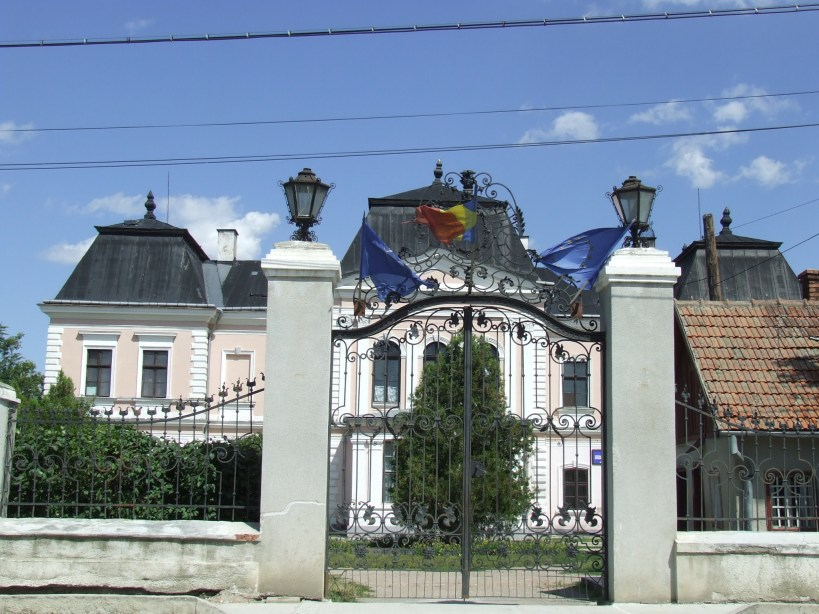
Răscruci Banffy castle

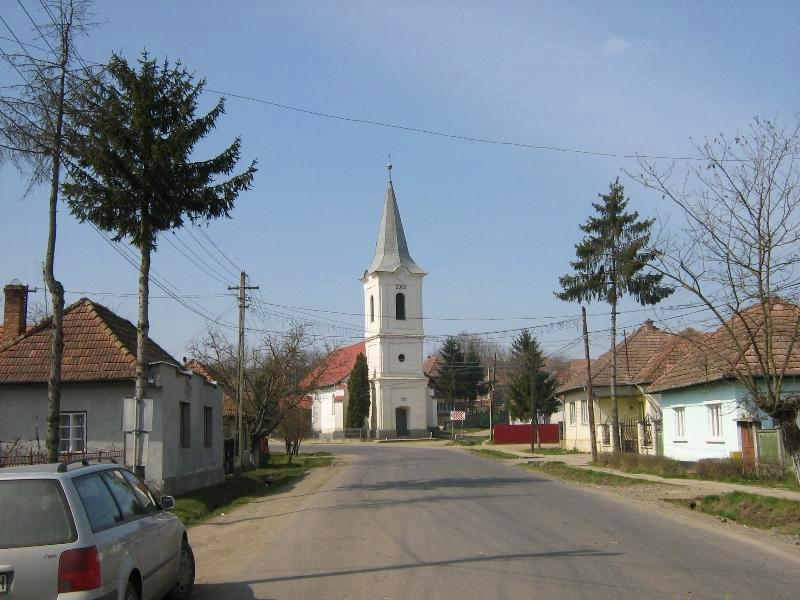
Câmpenița Reformed Church

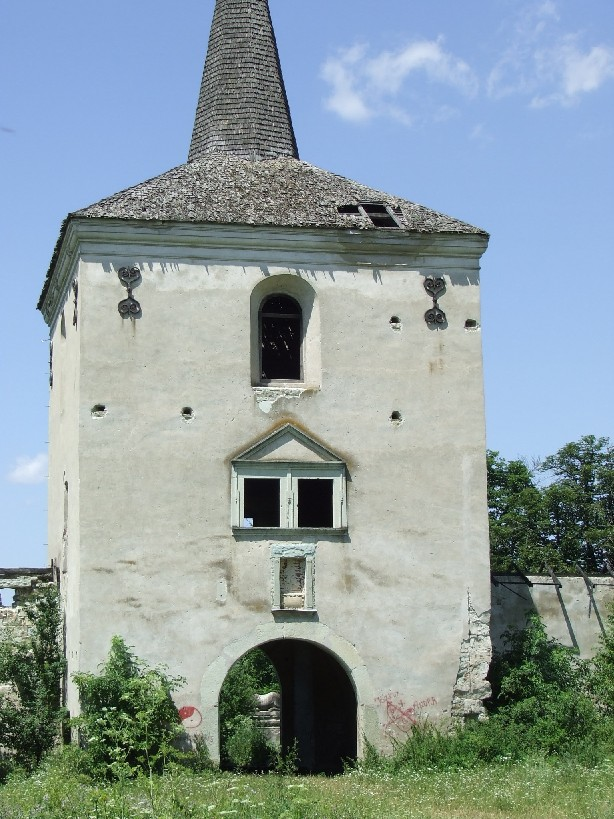
Kornis Castle în Mănăstirea

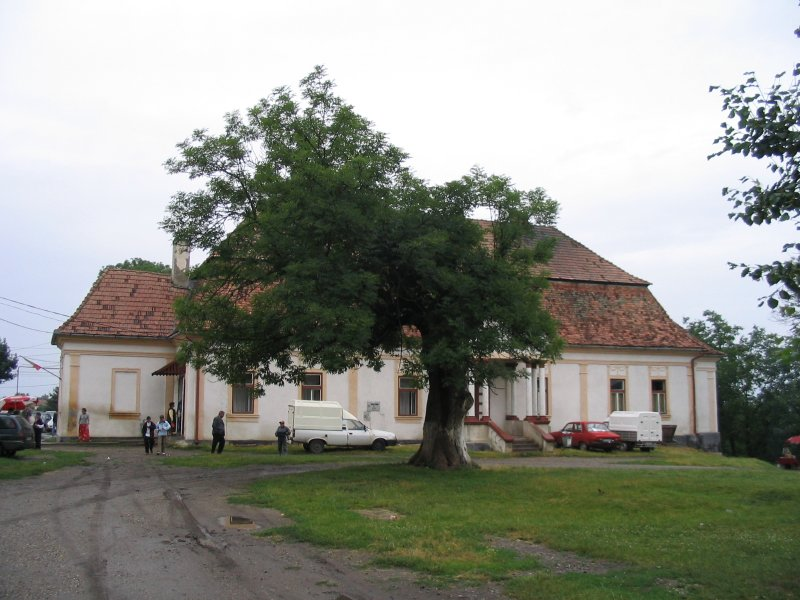
Voivodeni castle
