= Batoș =

- Commune
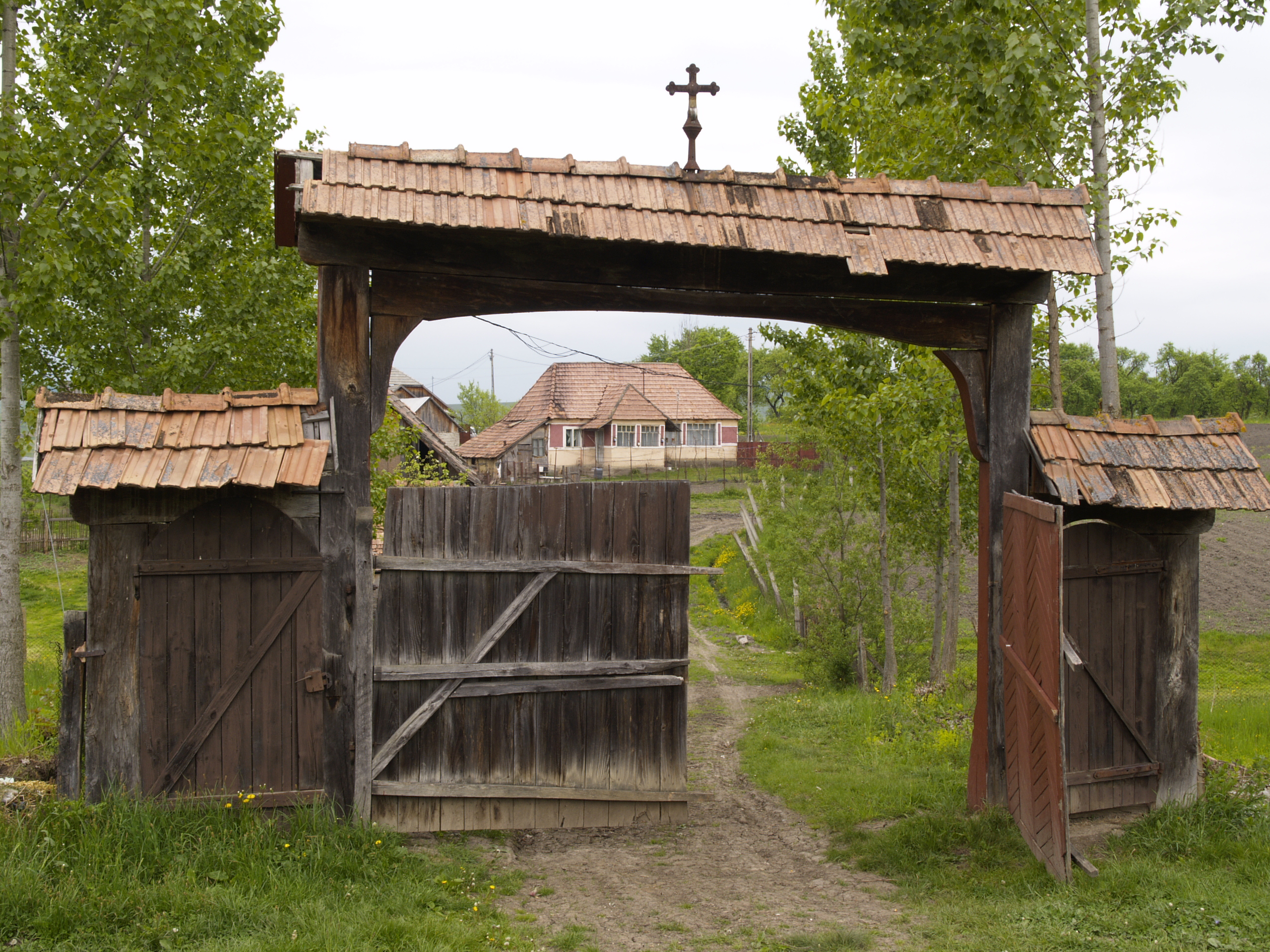
- House in Dedrad

- Coat of arms

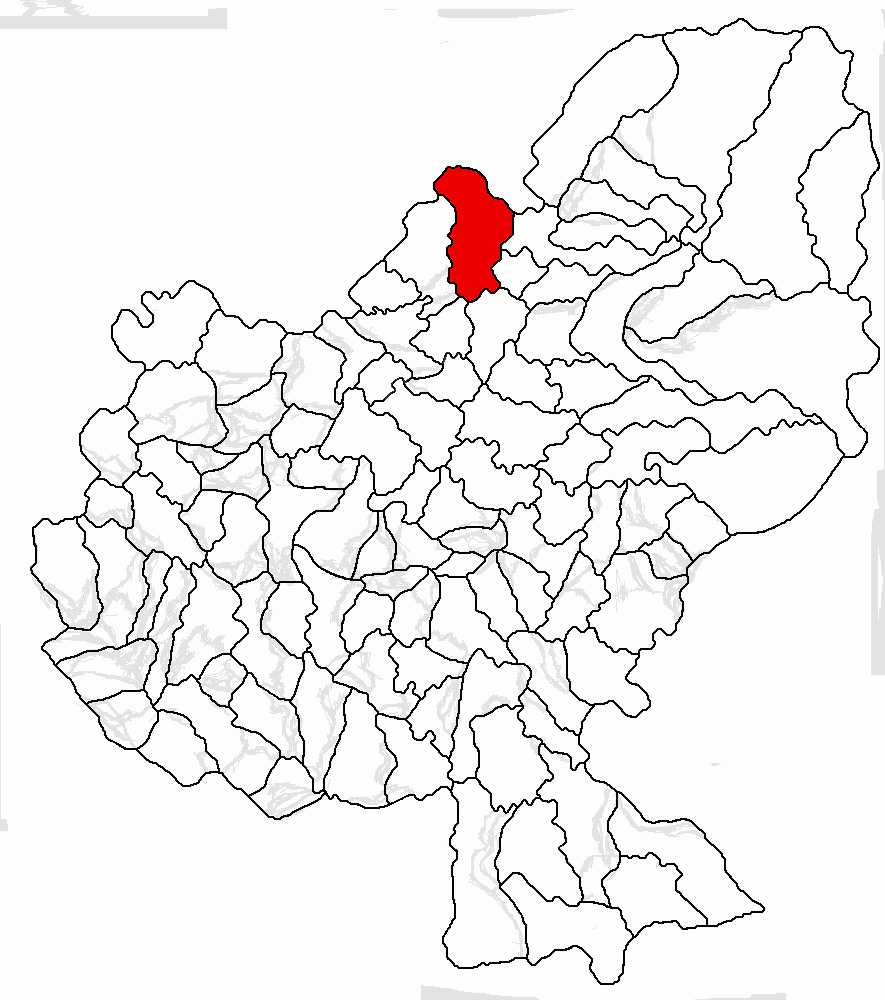
- Location in Mureș County

- Location in Romania
- Coordinates: 46°53′N 24°40′E
- Country: Romania
- County: Mureș

Government
  - Mayor (2020–2024): Dumitru Cotoi (PSD)
- Area: 83.67 km^{2} (32.31 sq mi)
- Elevation: 409 m (1,342 ft)
- Population (2021-12-01): 3,876
  - Density: 46.32/km^{2} (120.0/sq mi)
- Time zone: UTC+02:00 (EET)
  - Summer (DST): UTC+03:00 (EEST)
- Postal code: 547085
- Area code: (+40) 02 65
- Vehicle reg.: MS
- Website: primariabatos.ro

Batoș (Hungarian: Bátos, Hungarian pronunciation: [baːtoʃ]; German: Botsch) is a commune in Mureș County, Transylvania, Romania. It is composed of four villages: Batoș, Dedrad (Dedrád; Zepling), Goreni (Dedrádszéplak; Ungarisch Zepling), and Uila (Vajola; Weilau).

== Geography ==
The commune is situated on the Transylvanian Plateau, at an altitude of 409 m (1,342 ft). It is located in the northern part of Mureș County, 16 km (10 mi) from Reghin and 49 km (30 mi) from the county seat, Târgu Mureș, on the border with Bistrița-Năsăud County.

== Demographics ==
Historical population
Year	Pop.	±%
1850	5,323	—
1920	4,948	−7.0%
1930	4,814	−2.7%
1941	5,338	+10.9%
1956	5,036	−5.7%
1966	3,995	−20.7%
1977	4,816	+20.6%
1992	4,024	−16.4%
2002	4,173	+3.7%
2011	3,926	−5.9%
2021	3,876	−1.3%
Source: Census data

At the 2021 census, the commune had a population of 3,876, of which 72.08% were Romanians, 14.09% Hungarians, 7.51% Roma, and 1.21% Germans.

== Natives ==
- Johann Böhm (1929–2024), historian
- George Gross (1941–2010), American football player

== See also ==
- List of Hungarian exonyms (Mureș County)
