= Breaza, Mureș =

Breaza Beresztelke
- Commune
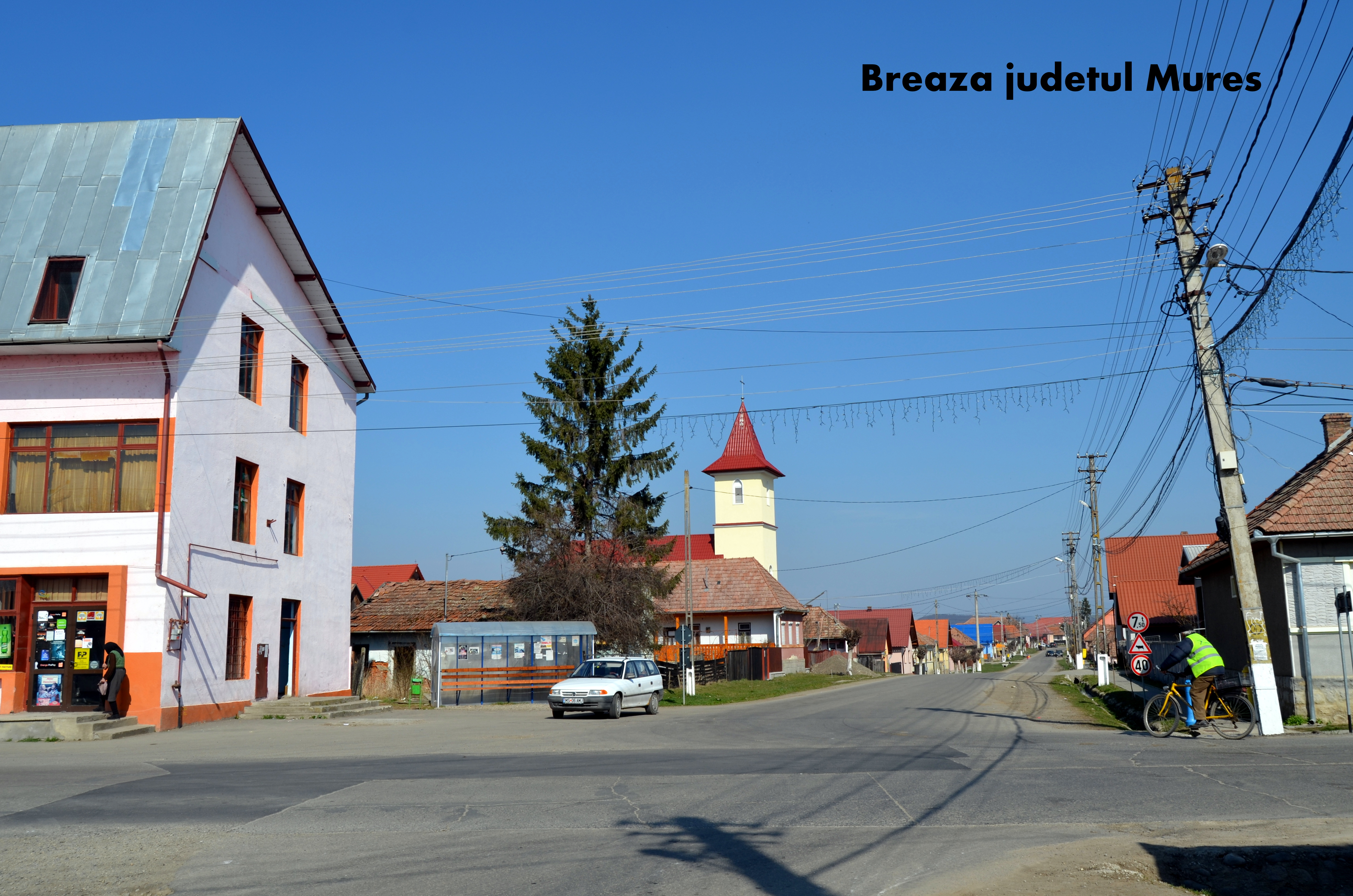

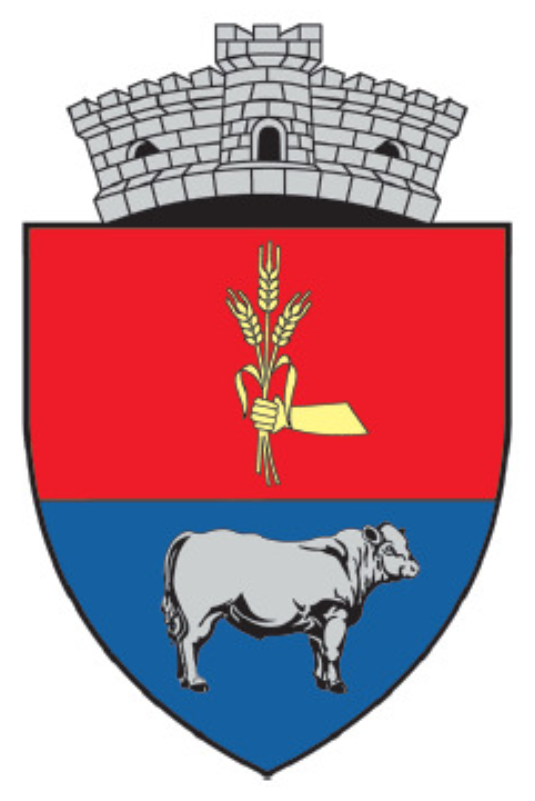
- Coat of arms

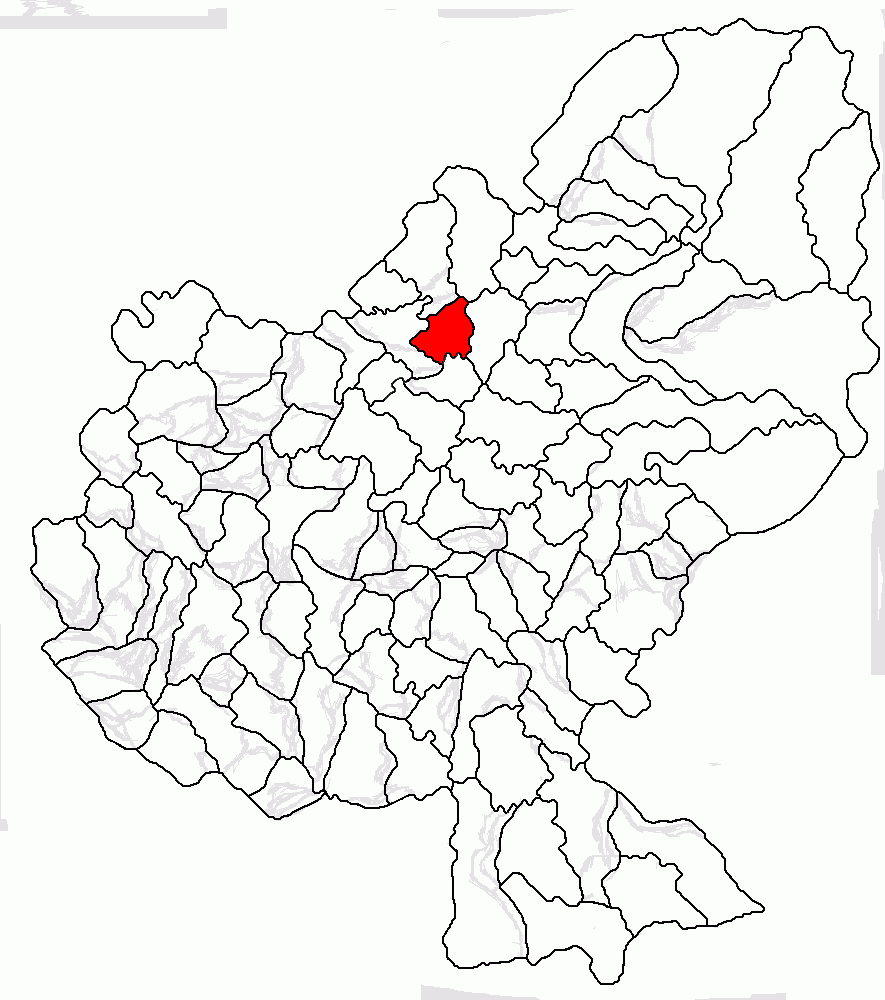
- Location in Mureș County

- Location in Romania
- Coordinates: 46.77°N 24.63°E
- Country: Romania
- County: Mureș

Government
  - Mayor (2024&ngash;2028): Sorin-Emilian Alexa (PNL)
- Area: 41.39 km^{2} (15.98 sq mi)
- Elevation: 375 m (1,230 ft)
- Population (2021-12-01): 2,197
  - Density: 53.08/km^{2} (137.5/sq mi)
- Time zone: UTC+02:00 (EET)
  - Summer (DST): UTC+03:00 (EEST)
- Postal code: 547135
- Area code: (+40) 0265
- Vehicle reg.: MS
- Website: comunabreaza.ro

Breaza (Hungarian: Beresztelke, Hungarian pronunciation: [bɛrɛstɛlkɛ]; German: Bretzdorf) is a commune in Mureș County, Transylvania, Romania. It is composed of three villages: Breaza, Filpișu Mare (Magyarfülpös; Ungarisch-Phelpsdorf), and Filpișu Mic (Kisfülpös).

At the 2021 census, the commune had a population of 2,197; of those, 44.65% were Romanians, 38.78% Hungarians, and 8.88% Roma.

== See also ==
- List of Hungarian exonyms (Mureș County)
