= Mureș County =

County of Romania

Mureș County Județul Mureș Maros megye
- County
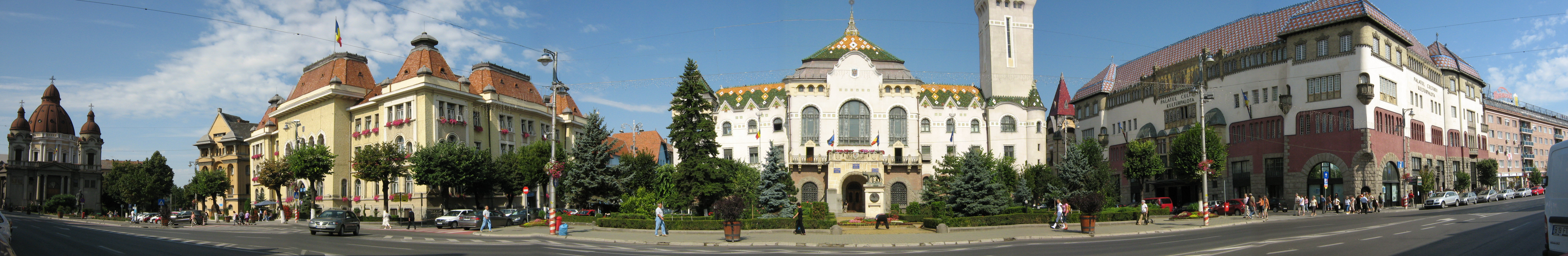
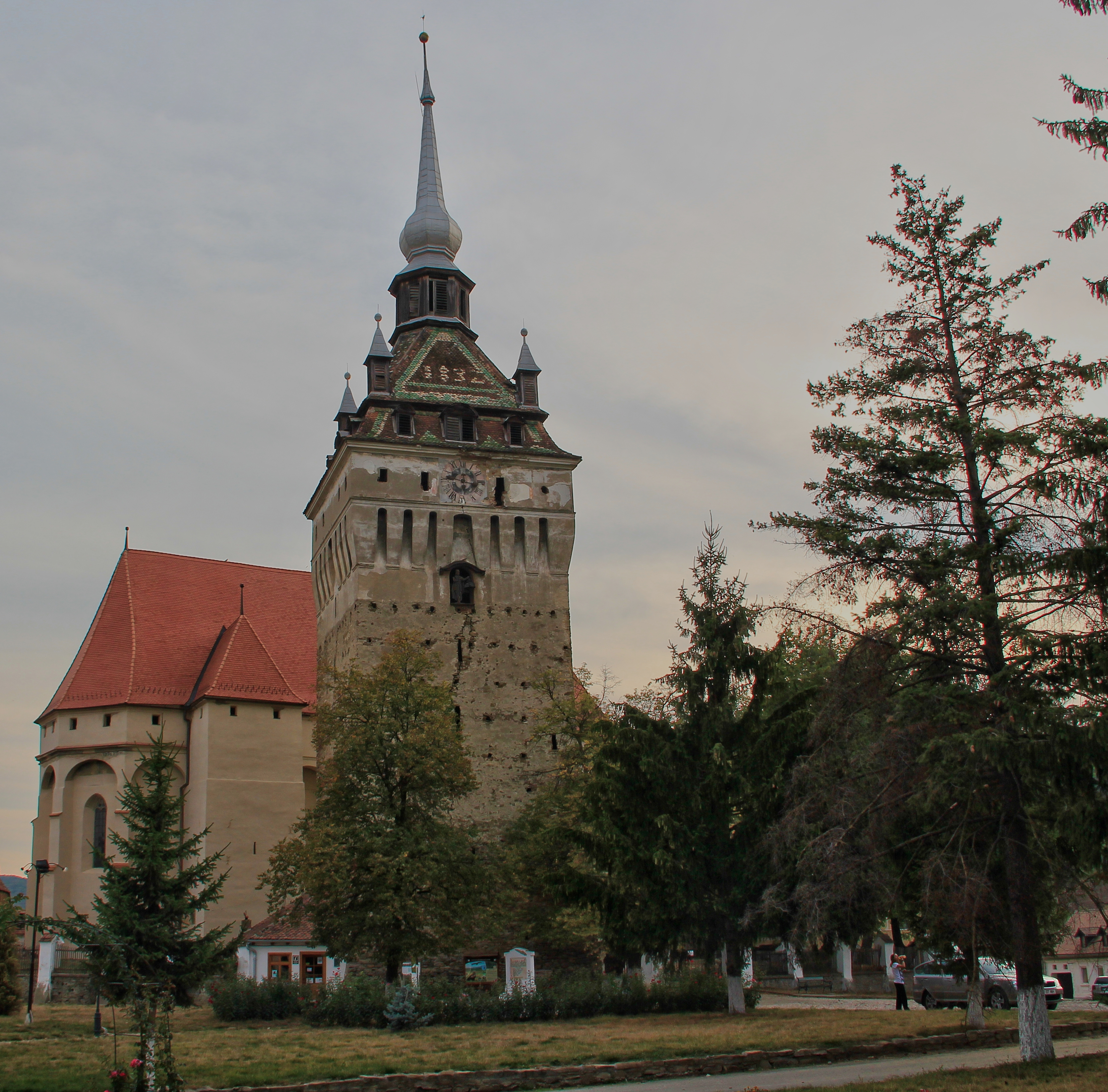
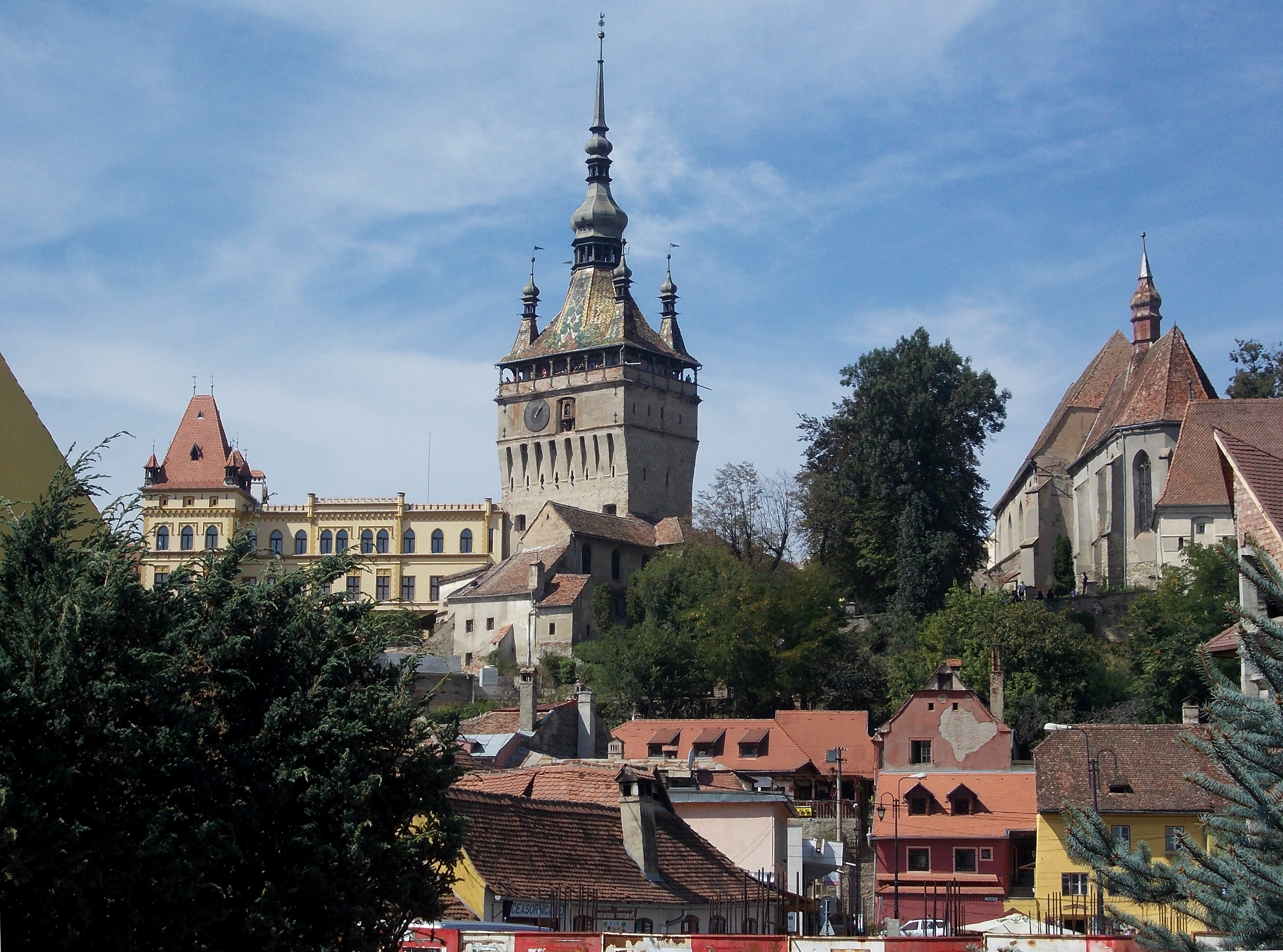
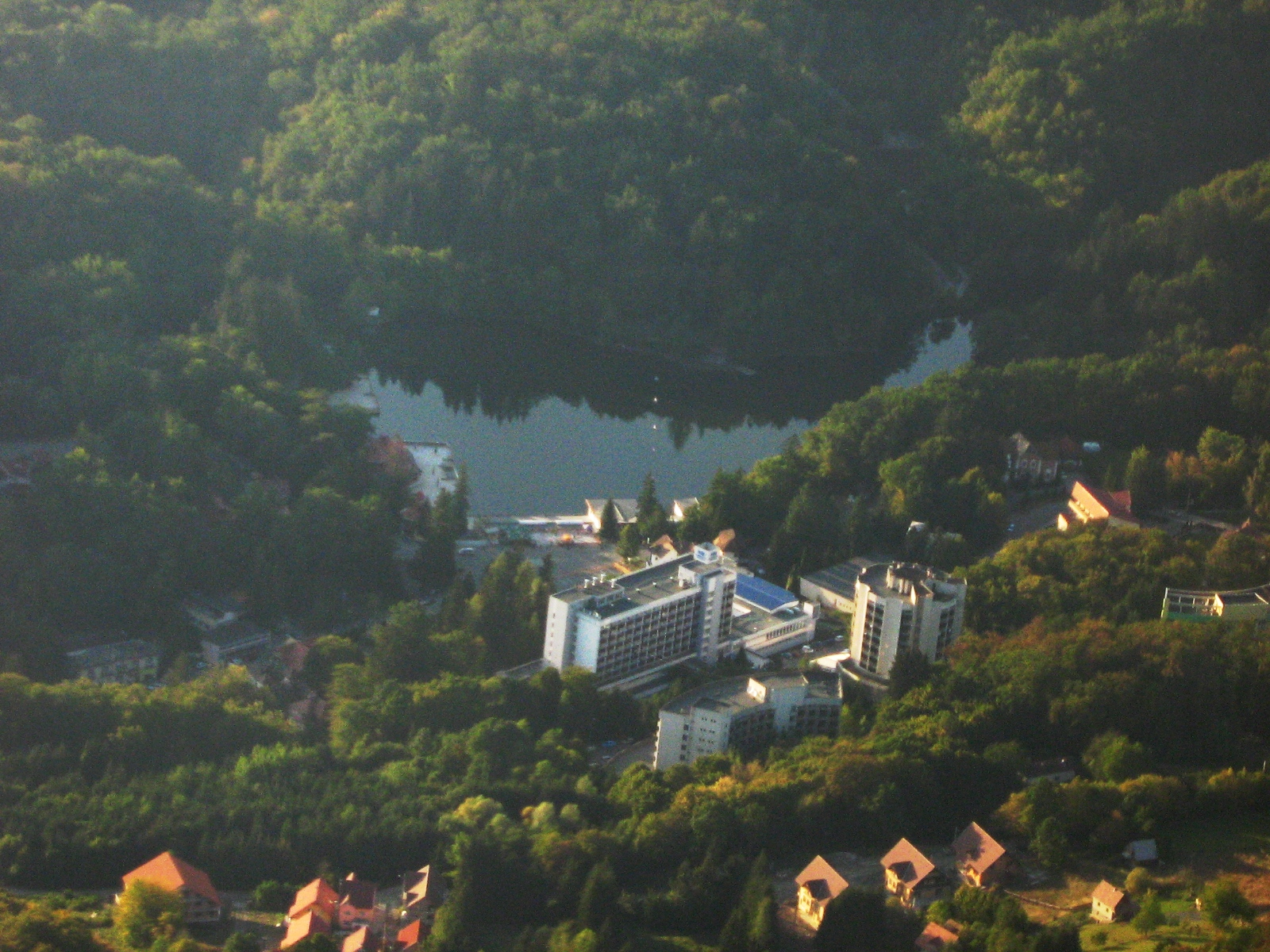
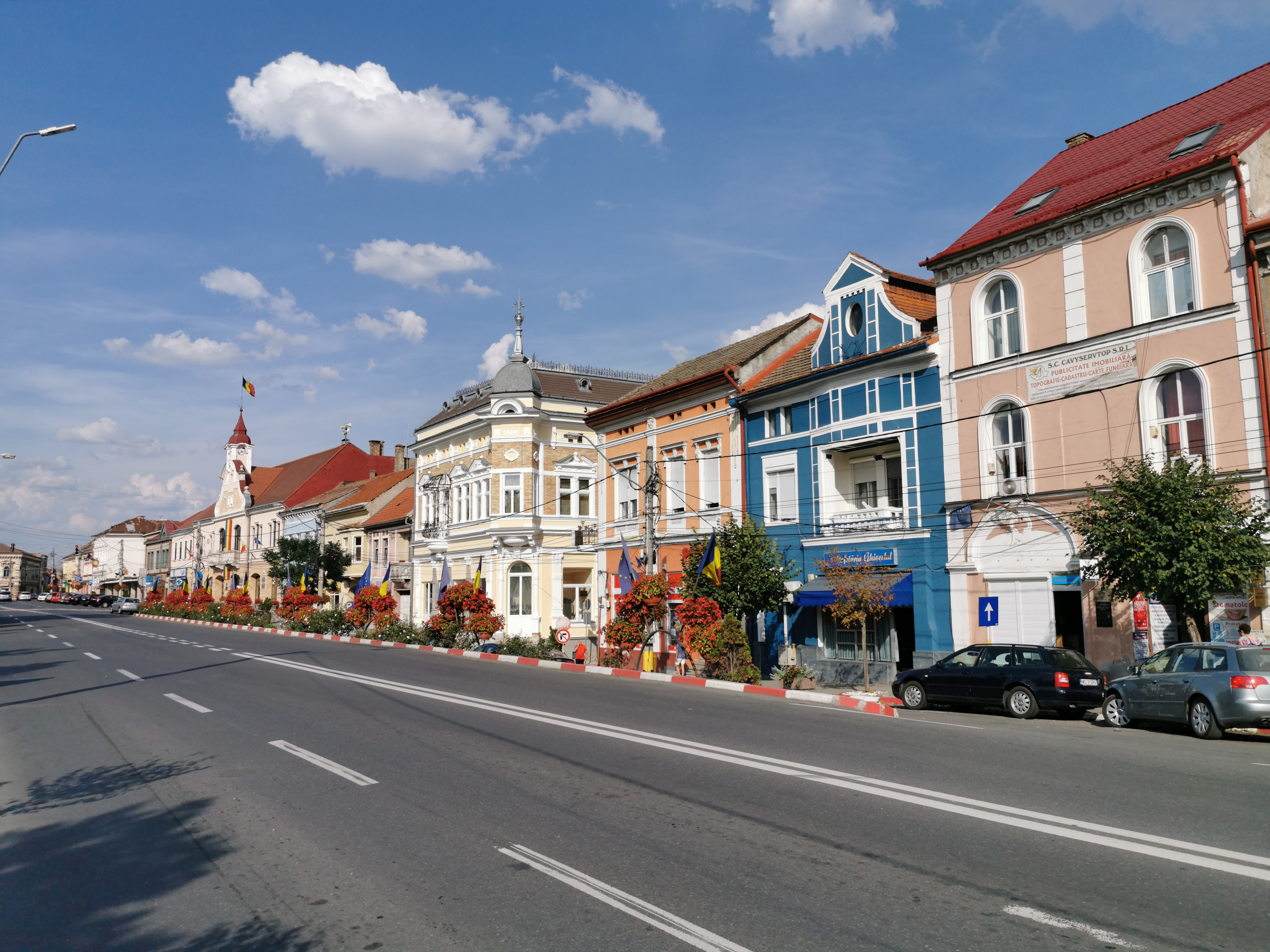
- Târgu Mureș Saschiz fortified church Sighișoara Sovata Reghin

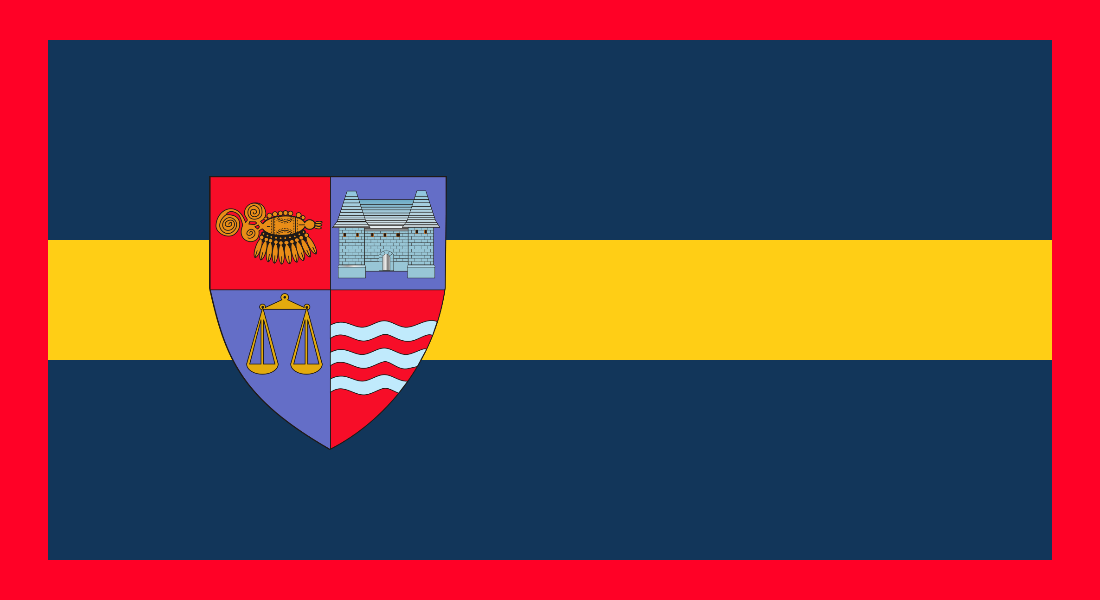
- Flag Coat of arms

- Coordinates: 46.59°N 24.61°E
- Country: Romania
- Development region^{1}: Centru
- Historic region: Transylvania
- County seat: Târgu Mureș

Government
  - Type: County Board
  - President of the County Board: Péter Ferenc (RMDSZ)
  - Prefect^{2}: Ciprian Dobre

Area
  - Total: 6,714 km^{2} (2,592 sq mi)
  - Rank: 11th in Romania

Population (2021-12-01)
  - Total: 518,193
  - Rank: 12th in Romania
  - Density: 82/km^{2} (210/sq mi)
- Time zone: UTC+2 (EET)
  - Summer (DST): UTC+3 (EEST)
- Postal Code: 54wxyz^{3}
- Area code: +40 x65^{4}
- Car plates: MS^{5}
- GDP (nominal): US$ 8.990 billion (2025)
- GDP per capita: US$ 17,348 (2025)
- Website: County Board; County Prefecture
- ^{1}The developing regions of Romania have no administrative role.^{2} as of 2007, the Prefect is not a politician, but a public functionary. He (or she) is not allowed to be a member of a political party, and is banned to have any political activity in the first six months after the resignation (or exclusion) from the public functionary corps^{3}w, x, y, and z are digits that indicate the city, the street, part of the street, or even the building of the address^{4}x is a digit indicating the operator: 2 for the former national operator, Romtelecom, and 3 for the other ground telephone networks^{5}used on both the plates of the vehicles that operate only in the county limits (like utility vehicles, ATVs, etc.), and the ones used outside the county

Mureș County (Romanian pronunciation: [ˈmureʃ], Romanian: Județul Mureș, Hungarian: Maros megye) is a county (județ) of Romania, in the historical region of Transylvania, with the administrative centre in Târgu Mureș. The county was established in 1968, after the administrative reorganization that re-introduced the historical județ (county) system, still used today. This reform eliminated the previous Mureș-Magyar Autonomous Region, which had been created in 1952 within the People's Republic of Romania. Mureș County has a vibrant multicultural fabric that includes Hungarian-speaking Székelys and Transylvanian Saxons, with a rich heritage of fortified churches and towns.

== Name ==
In Hungarian, it is known as Maros megye ([ˈmɒroʃ ˈmɛɟɛ]), and in German as Kreis Mieresch. Under Kingdom of Hungary, a county with a similar name (Maros-Torda County, Romanian: Comitatul Mureş-Turda) was created in 1876. There was a county with the same name under the Kingdom of Romania, and a Mureș-Magyar Autonomous Region (1960–1968) under the Socialist Republic of Romania.

== Geography ==
The county has a total area of 6,714 km^{2} (2,592 sq mi).

The northeastern side of the county consists of the Călimani and Gurghiu Mountains and the sub-Carpathian hills, members of the Inner Eastern Carpathians. The rest of the county is part of the Transylvanian Plateau, with deep but wide valleys.

The main river crossing in the county is the Mureș River. The Târnava Mare River and the Târnava Mică River also cross the county.

Mureș County is bordered by seven other counties: Suceava, Harghita, Brașov, Sibiu, Alba, Cluj and Bistrița-Năsăud.

=== Neighbours ===
- Harghita County in the East.
- Alba County and Cluj County in the West.
- Bistrița-Năsăud County and Suceava County in the North.
- Sibiu County and Brașov County in the South.

== Demographics ==
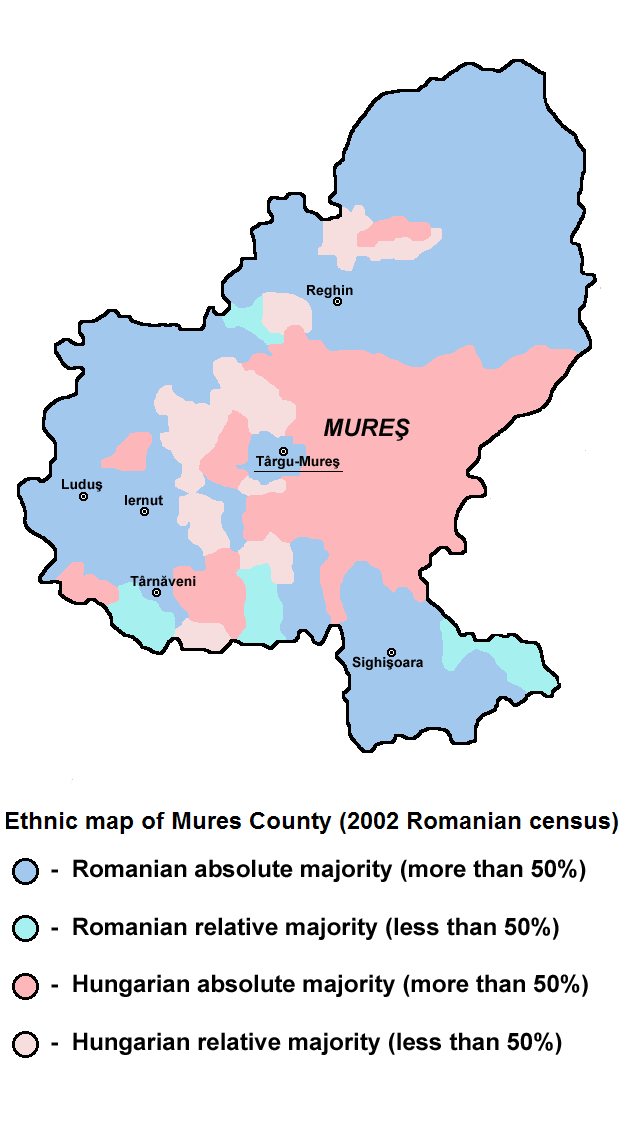
The ethnic map of Mureș county in 2002

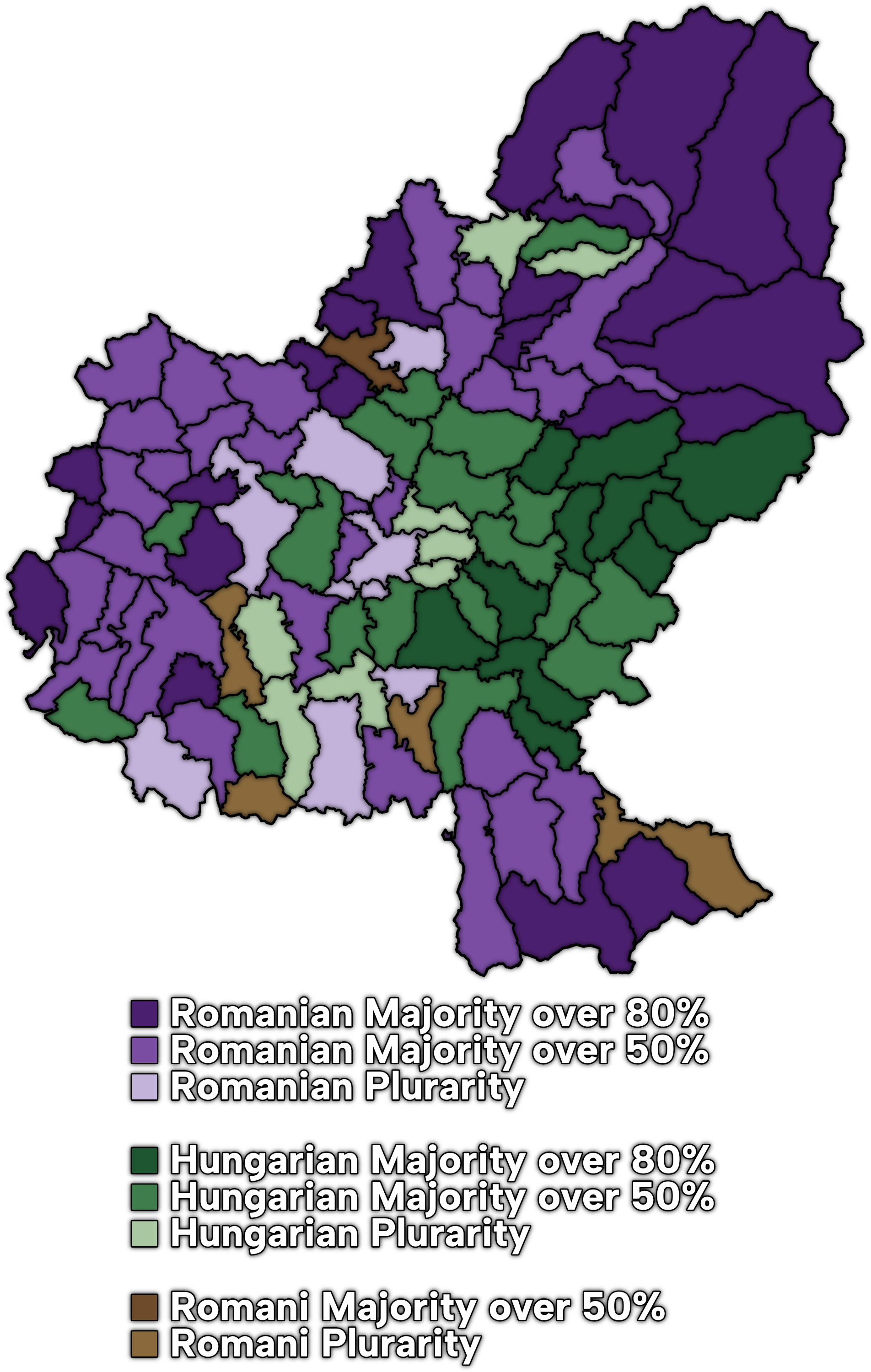
Ethnic map of Mureș county in 2021

In 2022, the population of Mureș County was registered as 518,193 people, 22,39% of them living in Târgu Mureș, making it the sixteenth largest city in Romania, with a population of 116,033 people.

The next city in the county by number of people is Reghin, with 29,742 people, followed by Sighișoara, with 23,927 and then Târnăveni, with 20,604.

Ethnic structure (2002)
Total	Romanians	Hungarians	Roma	Germans	Other
580,851	309,375	228,275	40,425	2,045	731
100%	53.26%	39.30%	6.96%	0.35%	0.12%

Ethnic structure (2011)
Total	Romanians	Hungarians	Roma	Germans	Other
550,846	277,372	200,858	46,947	1,478	792
100%	52.60%	38.09%	8.90%	0.28%	0.13%

Ethnic structure (2021)
Total	Romanians	Hungarians	Roma	Germans	Other
518,193	252,400	165,014	44,880	904	617
100%	54.42%	35.58%	9.68%	0.19%	0.13%

In terms of religion:

- Romanian Orthodox – 53.3%
- Reformed Church – 27%
- Roman Catholic Church – 9.5%
- Other Christian denominations – 8.2%
- Jewish, Muslim, Atheist, Non-religious, other, or undeclared – 1.9%

Historical population

Year	Pop.	±% p.a.
1829	77,823	—
1846	87,400	+0.69%
1868	91,000	+0.18%
1890	95,581	+0.22%
1900	178,096	+6.42%
1910	194,072	+0.86%

Year	Pop.	±% p.a.
1926	254,801	+1.72%
1930	425,721	+13.69%
1948	461,403	+0.45%
1956	513,261	+1.34%
1966	561,598	+0.90%
1977	605,345	+0.68%

Year	Pop.	±% p.a.
1992	607,298	+0.02%
2002	580,851	−0.44%
2011	550,846	−0.59%
2021	518,193	−0.61%

== Tourism ==
Some of the main tourist attractions in the county are:

- The old city of Târgu Mureș
- The medieval city of Sighișoara
- Sovata resort
- The city of Reghin
- The medieval fortified church of Saschiz
- Călimani Mountains – Gurghiu Mountains
- The Via Transilvanica long-distance hiking and biking trail, which crosses the county

== Media ==
=== TV stations ===
Channel	Name	Network	Launch date	Notes
1	TVR 1	Romanian Public Television	1956	Public channel
2	TVR 2	Romanian Public Television	1968 (hiatus 1985–1990)	Public channel
3	Pro TV Târgu-Mureș	Pro TV	1997	Affiliated stadion
4	Antena 1 Târgu-Mureș	Antena 1	1998	Affiliated stadion
5	Prima TV Târgu-Mureș	Prima TV	2008	Affiliated station
26	TTM	None	2006	Local news channel
25	Știi TV	None	2008	Local news channel
57	DIGI24 HD Cluj-Napoca	RCS&RDS	2013	Regional news channel
63	TVR Târgu-Mureș	Romanian Public Television	2008	Regional station
	Gliga TV Reghin	Gliga CATV	2001	Local news channel in Reghin
	DaReghin	None	2009	Local news channel in Reghin
	Târnava TV	None	2008	Local news channel in Sighișoara and Târnăveni

The only cable provider in Târgu-Mureș is RCS&RDS, in Reghin is Gliga CATV, and in Sighișoara Teleson .

=== Radio stations ===
==== Târgu-Mureș stations ====
Frequency	Name	Launch date	Format	Notes
FM 102.9	Radio România Târgu-Mureș	1958	Public / news – music	Regional station
FM 89.1	PRO FM	1997	Commercial radio	Bucharest
FM 90.3	Kiss FM	2003	Commercial radio	Bucharest
FM 90.7	Europa FM	2002	Commercial radio	Bucharest
FM 88	Radio "GaGa"	1994	Commercial radio	Targu Mures
FM 88.4	Rock FM	1997		Bucharest
FM 92.7	Radio 21	2002		Bucharest
FM 93.6	Radio România Actualități	1928		Bucharest
FM 97.1	Erdély FM	2007		
FM 98	Radio Zu	2008		Bucharest
FM 100.6	Național FM	2004		Oradea
FM 101.2	Magic FM	2000		Bucharest
FM 101.6	Radio InfoPRO	2005		Bucharest
FM 105.6	Radio SON	2007		Sighișoara

=== Print ===
==== Newspapers and magazines ====
- Cuvântul Liber
- Zi de Zi
- Ziarul de Mureș
- Népújság
- Krónika
- Vásárhelyi Hírlap

== Economy ==
The predominant industries in the county are:

- Wood industry
- Food industry
- Textiles
- Glass and ceramics
- Construction materials
- Musical instruments (Reghin)

Mureș County and Sibiu County together produce about 50% of the natural gas developed in Romania. Salt is also extracted in the county.

== Politics ==
The Mureș County Council, renewed at the 2024 local elections, consists of 34 counsellors, with the following party composition:

2024-2028

Party	Seats	Current Council
Democratic Alliance of Hungarians (UDMR/RMDSZ)	14	
Social Democratic Party (PSD)	9	
National Liberal Party (PNL)	8	
Alliance for the Union of Romanians (AUR)	3	

2020 local elections results

Party	Seats	Current Council
Democratic Alliance of Hungarians (UDMR/RMDSZ)	16	
National Liberal Party (PNL)	9	
Social Democratic Party (PSD)	7	
People's Movement Party (PMP)	2	

== Administrative divisions ==
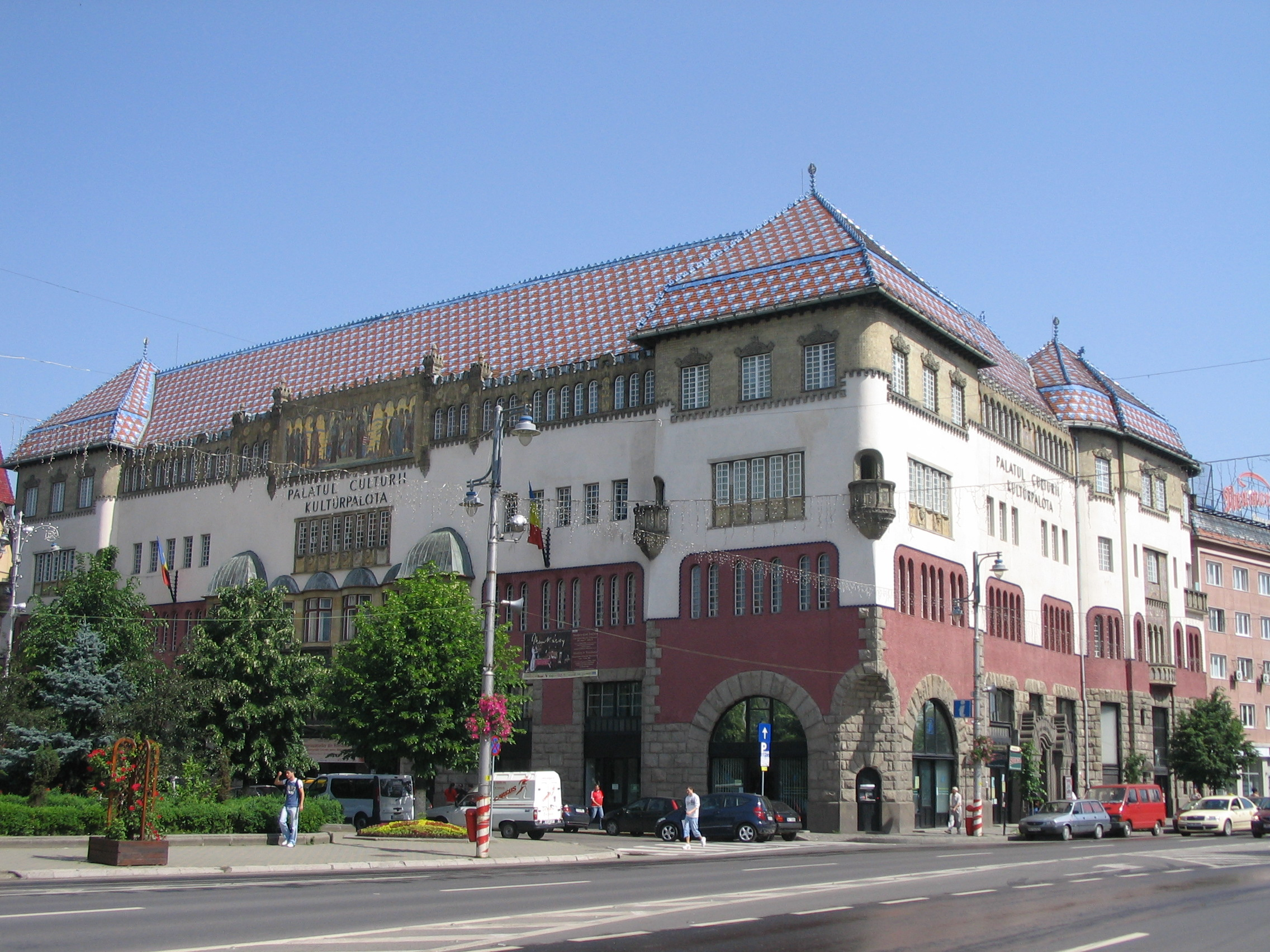
The Cultural Palace built between 1911 and 1913, Târgu Mureș (German: Neumarkt am Mieresch)

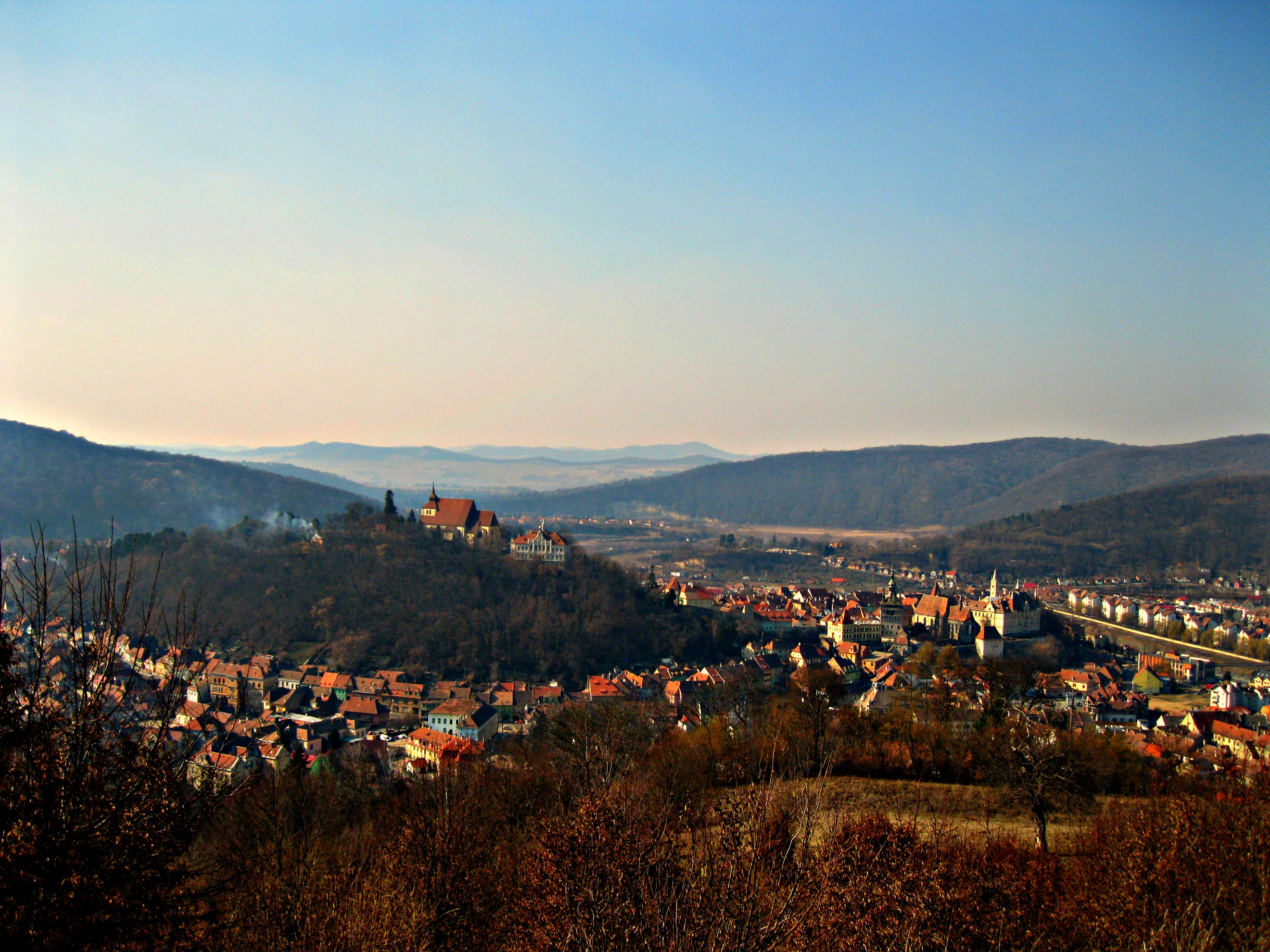
Sighișoara (German: Schäßburg)

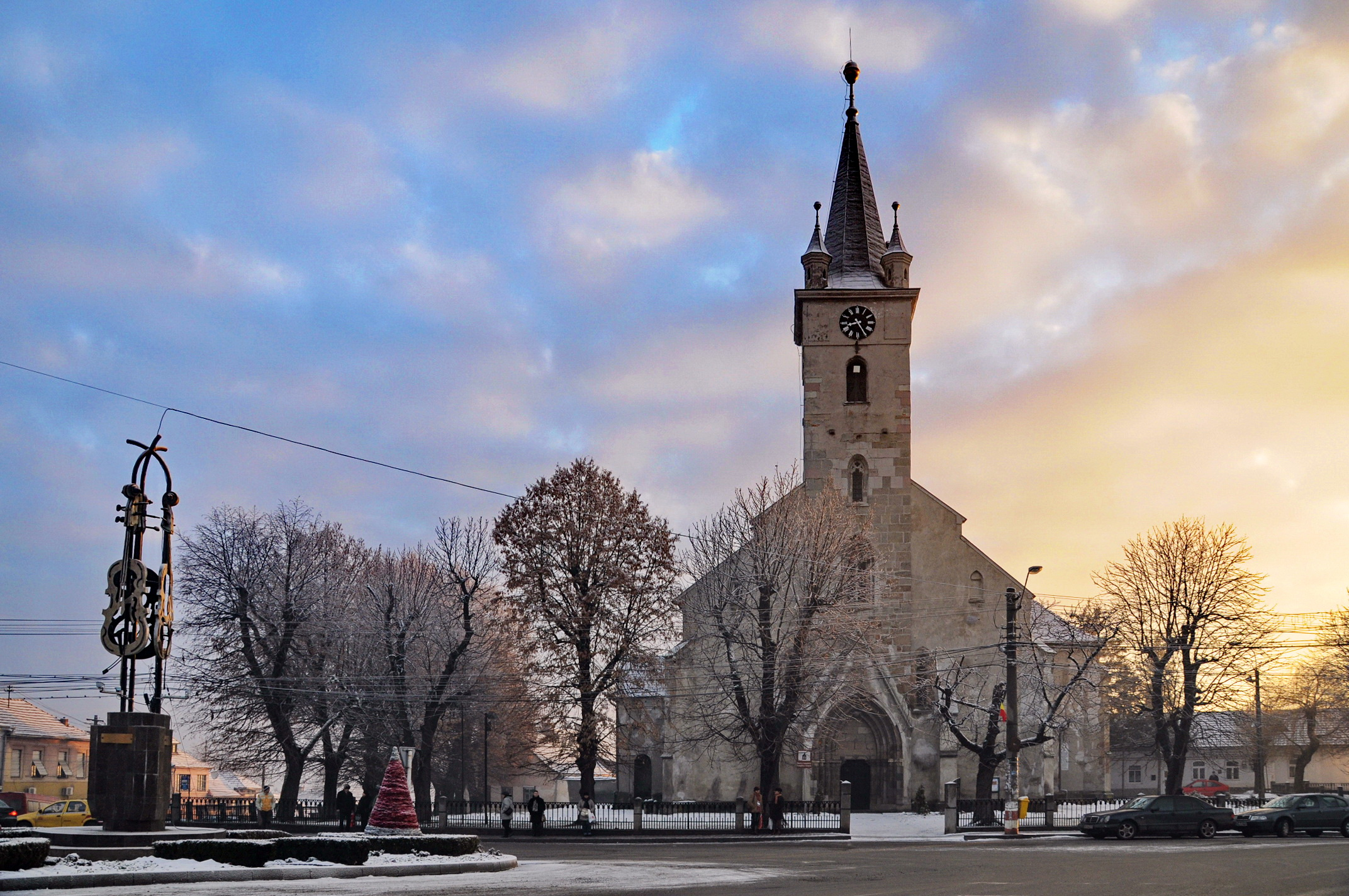
Reghin (German: Sächsisch Regen)

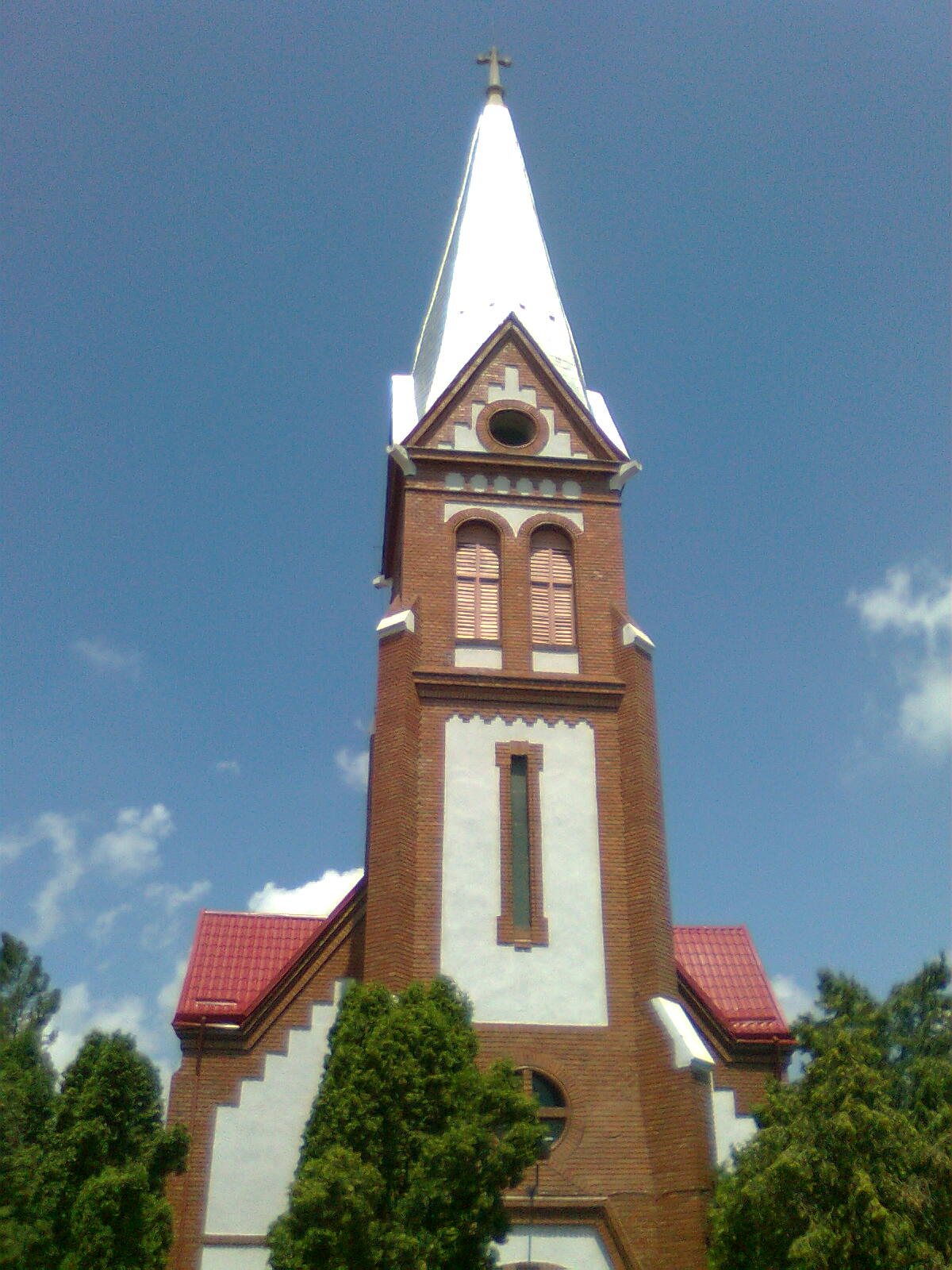
Luduș (German: Ludasch)

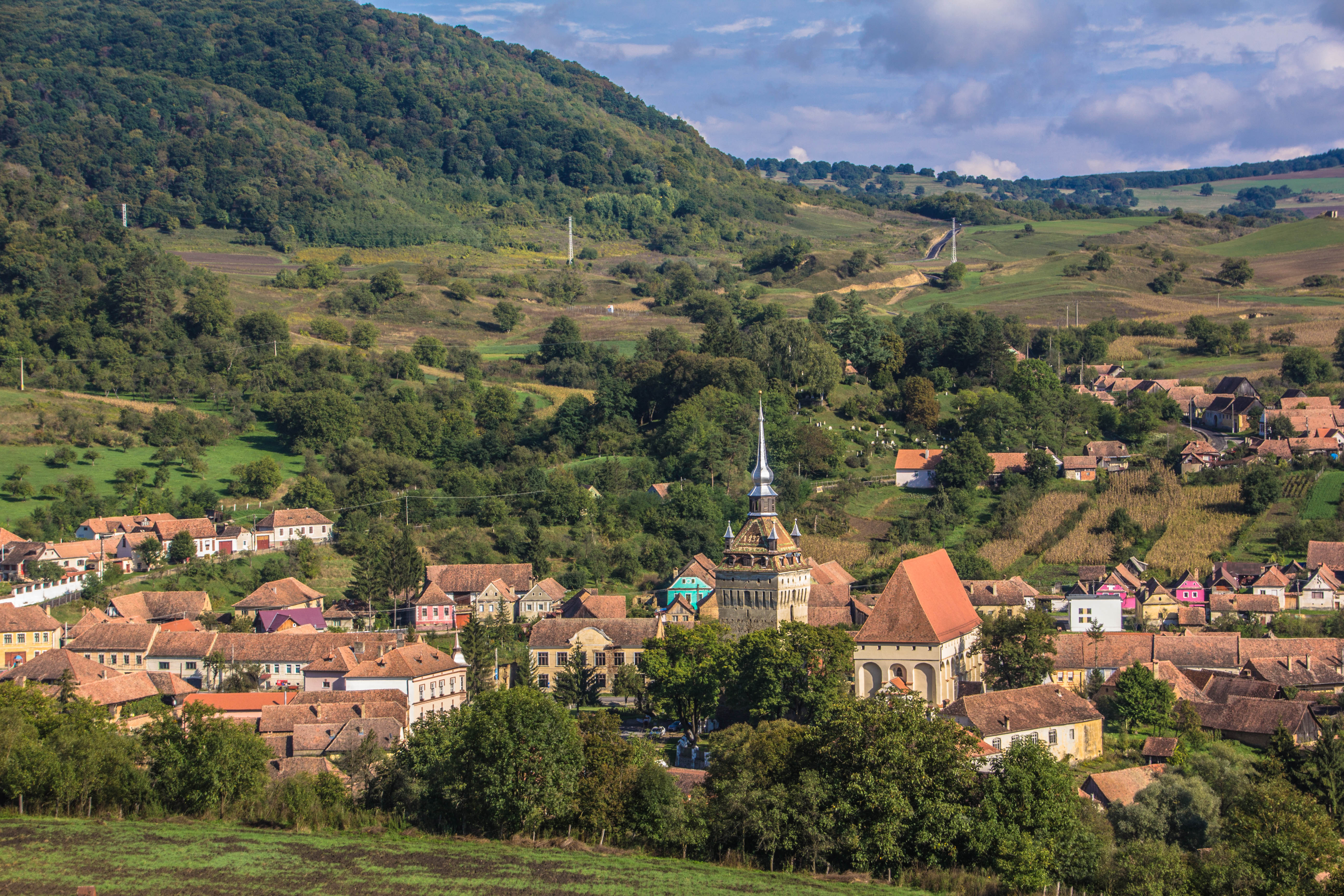
Saschiz (German: Keisd or Hünenburg)

Mureș County has 4 municipalities, 7 towns and 91 communes.

Municipalities

- Târgu Mureș – county seat; population: 134,290 (as of 2011)
- Reghin
- Sighișoara
- Târnăveni

Towns

- Iernut
- Luduș
- Miercurea Nirajului
- Sângeorgiu de Pădure
- Sărmașu
- Sovata
- Ungheni

Communes

- Acățari
- Adămuș
- Albești
- Aluniș
- Apold
- Ațintiș
- Bahnea
- Band
- Batoș
- Băgaciu
- Băla
- Bălăușeri
- Beica de Jos
- Bereni
- Bichiș
- Bogata
- Brâncovenești
- Breaza
- Ceuașu de Câmpie
- Chețani
- Chibed
- Chiheru de Jos
- Coroisânmărtin
- Corunca
- Cozma
- Crăciunești
- Cucerdea
- Crăiești
- Cristești
- Cuci
- Daneș
- Deda
- Eremitu
- Ernei
- Fântânele
- Fărăgău
- Gălești
- Gănești
- Gheorghe Doja
- Ghindari
- Glodeni
- Gornești
- Grebenișu de Câmpie
- Gurghiu
- Hodac
- Hodoșa
- Ibănești
- Iclănzel
- Ideciu de Jos
- Livezeni
- Lunca
- Lunca Bradului
- Mădăraș
- Măgherani
- Mica
- Miheșu de Câmpie
- Nadeș
- Neaua
- Ogra
- Papiu Ilarian
- Pănet
- Păsăreni
- Petelea
- Pogăceaua
- Râciu
- Răstolița
- Rușii-Munți
- Sâncraiu de Mureș
- Sângeorgiu de Mureș
- Sânger
- Sânpaul
- Sânpetru de Câmpie
- Sântana de Mureș
- Sărățeni
- Saschiz
- Solovăstru
- Stânceni
- Suplac
- Suseni
- Șăulia
- Șincai
- Tăureni
- Valea Largă
- Vânători
- Vărgata
- Vătava
- Vețca
- Viișoara
- Voivodeni
- Zagăr
- Zau de Câmpie

== Historical county ==
Județul Mureș
- County (Județ)
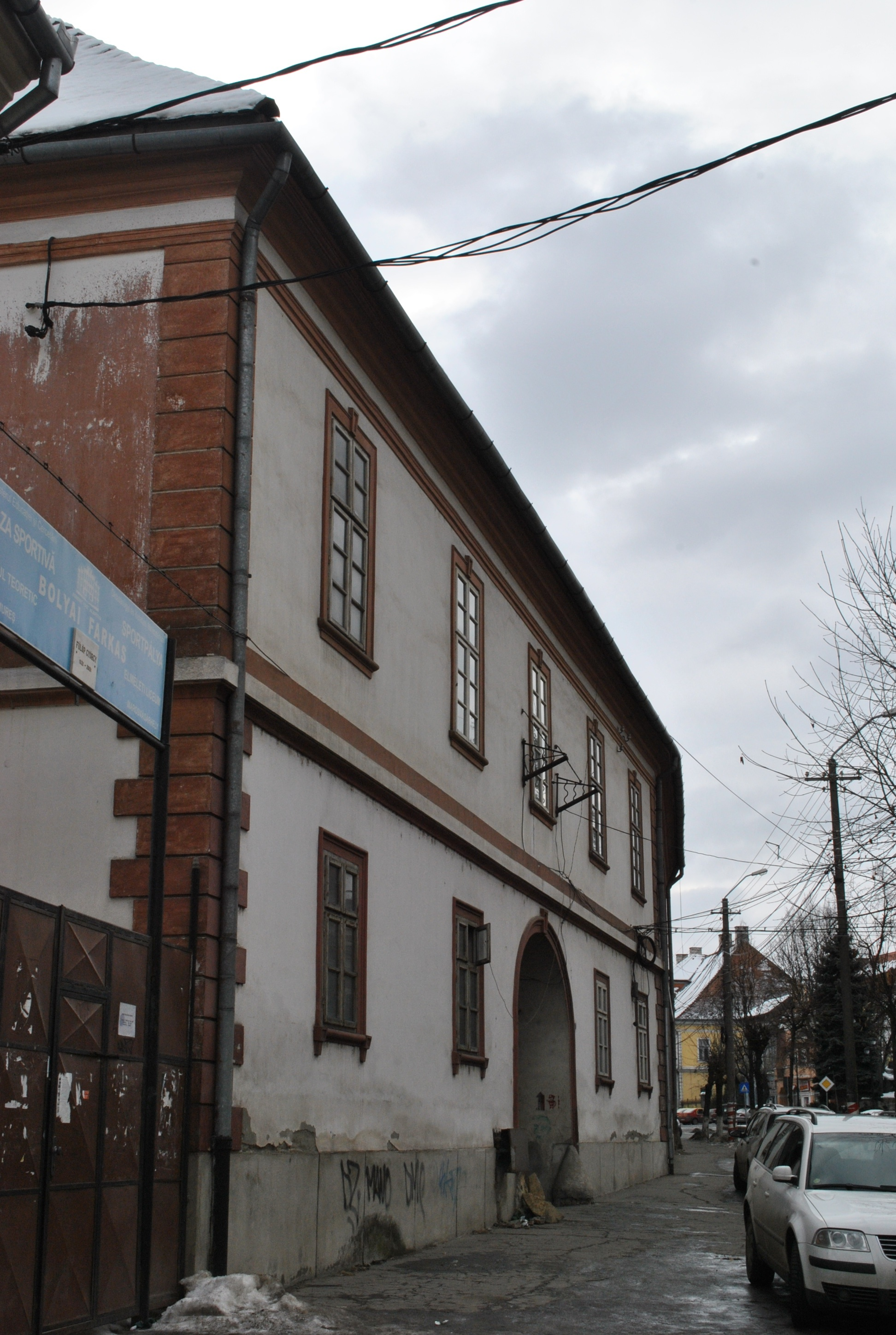
- The Mureș County Prefecture building of the interwar period.

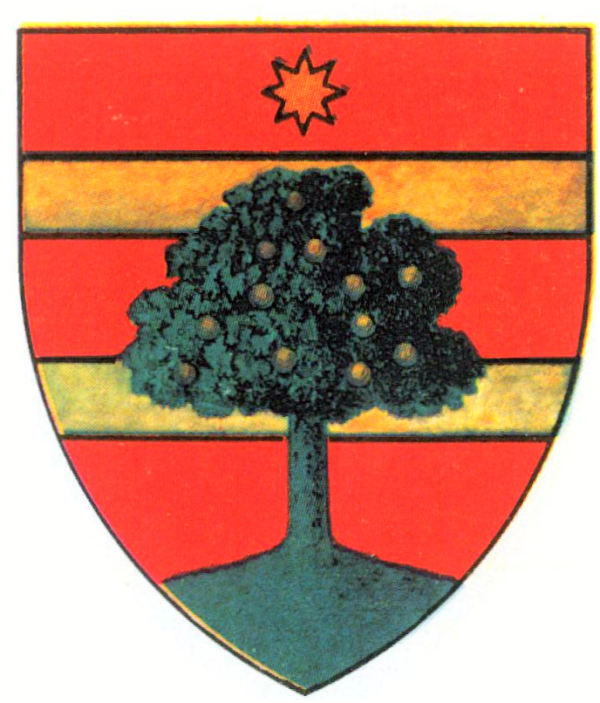
- Coat of arms

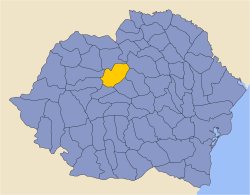
- Country: Romania
- Historic region: Transylvania
- Capital city (Reședință de județ): Târgu Mureș
- Established: 1925

Area
  - Total: 4,856 km^{2} (1,875 sq mi)

Population (1930)
  - Total: 289,456
  - Density: 59.61/km^{2} (154.4/sq mi)
- Time zone: UTC+2 (EET)
  - Summer (DST): UTC+3 (EEST)

Historically, Mureş-Turda County was located in the central-northern part of Greater Romania, in the central part of Transylvania. The capital was Târgu Mureș. After the administrative unification law in 1925, it was renamed to Mureș County, and the territory was reorganized. It was bordered on the south by Târnava-Mică County, on the southwest by Turda County, on the west by Cluj County, on the north by Năsăud County, on the northeast with the counties of Câmpulung and Neamț, and on the southeast with the counties of Ciuc and Odorhei. Most of the territory of the historical county is found in the present Mureș County, except for the northeastern area, which is located in Harghita County, and the northwestern area in Bistrița-Năsăud County today.

=== History ===
Prior to World War I, the territory of the county belonged to Austria-Hungary and identical with the Maros-Torda County of the Kingdom of Hungary. The territory of Mureș County was transferred to Romania from Hungary as successor state to Austria-Hungary in 1920 under the Treaty of Trianon.

In 1938, King Carol II promulgated a new Constitution, and subsequently he had the administrative division of the Romanian territory changed. 10 ținuturi (approximate translation: "lands") were created (by merging the counties) to be ruled by rezidenți regali (approximate translation: "Royal Residents") – appointed directly by the King – instead of the prefects. Mureș County became part of Ținutul Mureș.

In 1940, the county was transferred back to Hungary with the rest of Northern Transylvania under the Second Vienna Award. Beginning in 1944, Romanian forces with Soviet assistance recaptured the ceded territory and reintegrated it into Romania, re-establishing the county. Romanian jurisdiction over the entire county per the Treaty of Trianon was reaffirmed in the Paris Peace Treaties, 1947. The county was disestablished by the communist government of Romania in 1950, and re-established in 1968 when Romania restored the county administrative system.

=== Administration ===
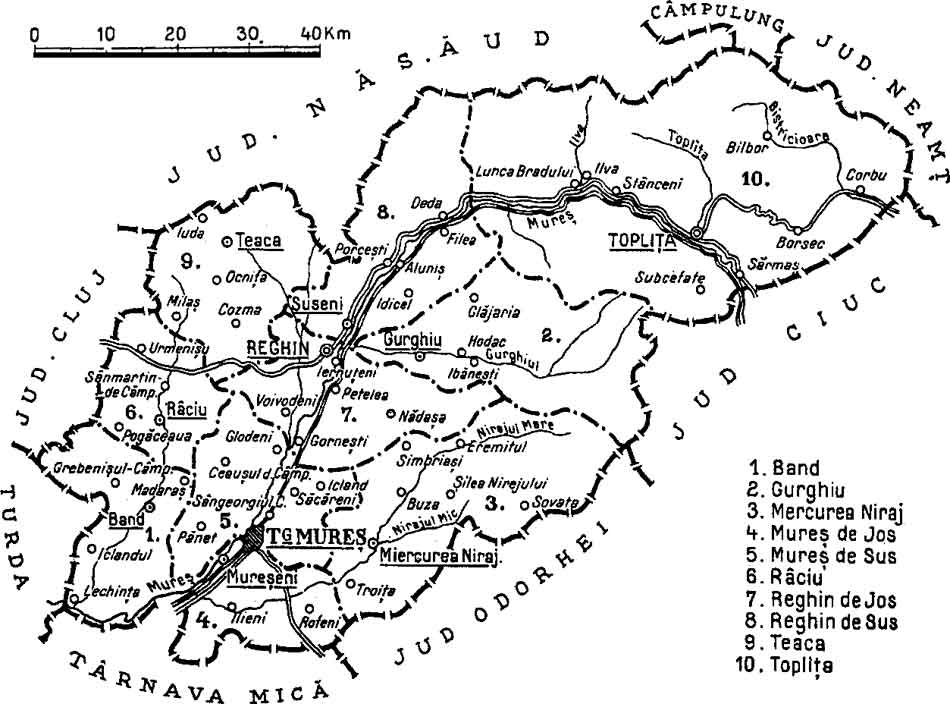
Map of Mureș County as constituted in 1938.

The county originally consisted of seven districts (plăși):

1. Plasa Band, headquartered at Band
2. Plasa Miercurea Nirajului, headquartered at Miercurea Nirajului
3. Plasa Râciu, headquartered at Râciu
4. Plasa Reghin, headquartered at Reghin
5. Plasa Târgu Mureș (also called Plasa Mureș), headquartered at Târgu Mureș
6. Plasa Teaca, headquartered at Teaca
7. Plasa Toplița, headquartered at Toplița

A subsequent administrative adjustment added one district, divided Plasa Mureș into two, and divided Plasa Reghin into two, leaving ten districts:

1. Plasa Band, headquartered at Band
2. Plasa Gurhiu, headquartered at Gurghiu
3. Plasa Miercurea Nirajului, headquartered at Miercurea Nirajului
4. Plasa Mureș de Jos, headquartered at Mureșeni
5. Plasa Mureș de Sus, headquartered at Târgu Mureș
6. Plasa Râciu, headquartered at Râciu
7. Plasa Reghin de Jos, headquartered at Reghin
8. Plasa Reghin de Sus, headquartered at Suseni
9. Plasa Teaca, headquartered at Teaca
10. Plasa Toplița, headquartered at Toplița

The county had two urban localities: Târgu Mureş (a city) and Reghin (urban commune).

=== Population ===
According to the census data of 1930, the county's population was 289,546, of which 45.8% were Romanians, 42.6% Hungarians, 3.9% Germans, 3.9% Romanies, 3.4% Jews, as well as other minorities. By mother tongue, the county population consisted of 45.9% Hungarian speakers, 45.5% Romanian speakers, 3.9% German speakers, 2.2% Yiddish speakers, and 2.1% Romany speakers. In the religious aspect, the population consisted of 32.4% Greek Catholic, 30.3% Reformed, 14.5% Eastern Orthodox, 12.1% Roman Catholic, 3.9% Lutheran, 3.6% Jewish, 2.6% Unitarian, as well as other minorities.

==== Urban population ====
In 1930, the urban population of the county was 47,807, of which 54.3% were Hungarians, 24.3% Romanians, 13.4% Jews, 6.0% Germans, 1.1% Romanies, as well as other minorities. As a mother tongue in the urban population, Hungarian was spoken by 61.2% of the population, followed by Romanian, spoken by 23.6% of the population as mother tongue, Yiddish (7.4%) and German (6.2%). From the religious point of view, the urban population was made up of 32.6% Reformed, 20.1% Roman Catholic, 14.2% Greek Catholic, 14.2% Jewish, 10% Eastern Orthodox, 5.9% Lutheran, 2.3% Unitarian, as well as other minorities.
