= Nirajul Mic River =

Nirajul Mic River may refer to:

- Nirajul Mic (Câmpu Cetății), one of the headwaters of the river Niraj, near Câmpu Cetății
- Nirajul Mic (Miercurea Nirajului), a tributary of the river Niraj, near Miercurea Nirajului

== See also ==
- Nirajul Mare
- Niraj
