= Ținutul Sării revolt =

- Part of the Hungarian–Romanian War
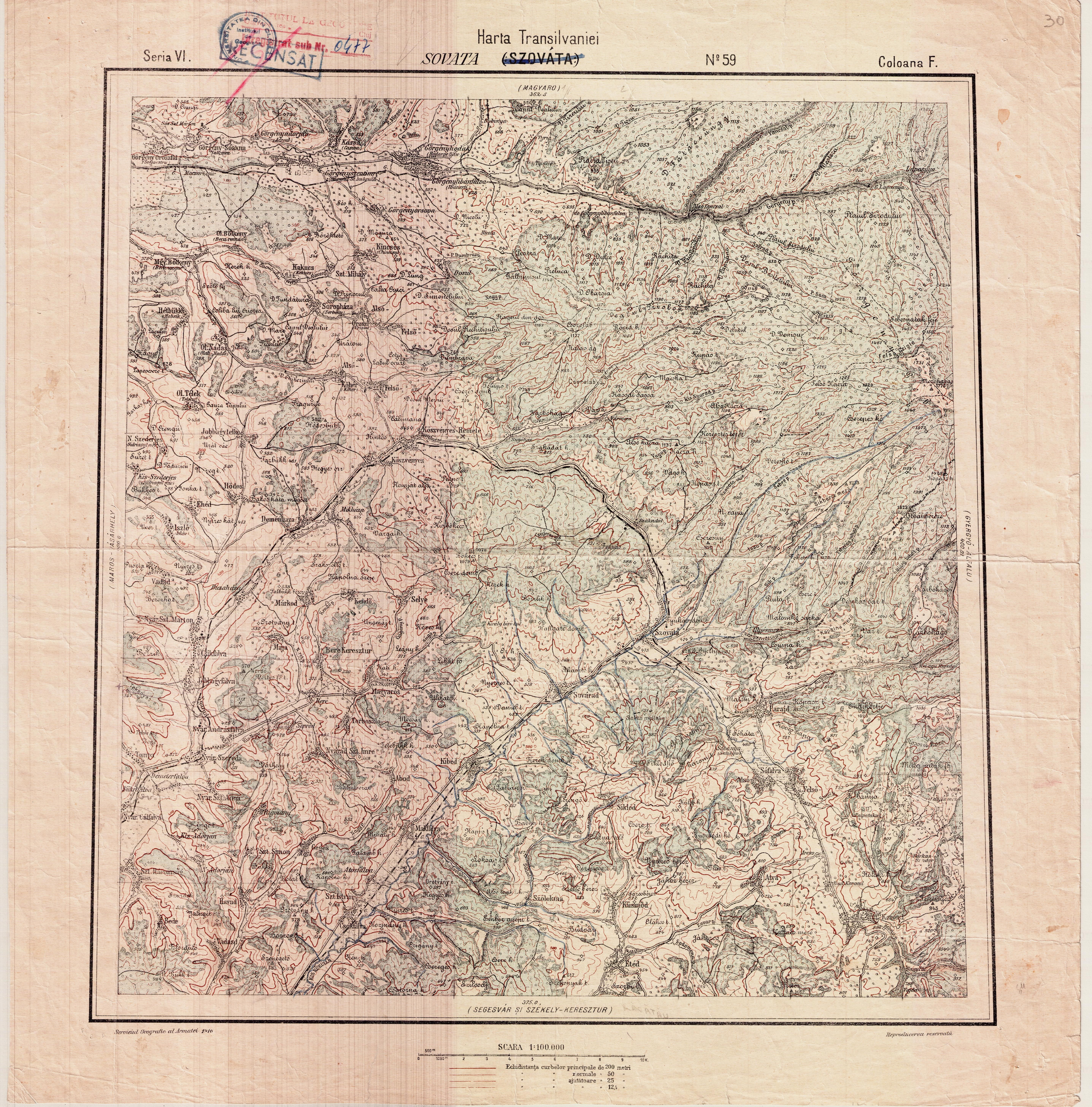
- Map of the area, from 1914
Date	29 March – 6 April 1919
Location	Upper valley of the Niraj, Romania
Result	Romanian victory

Belligerents
Romania	Rebels from the Maros-Torda and Udvarhely counties

Strength
200 soldiers 30 gendarmes	1,000 participants, of which 200 armed with firearms

Casualties and losses
3 gendarmes killed	3 rebels died in battle and 1 death sentence Indirect victims: 12 civilians, of which 7 died in custody and 5 death sentences

The Ținutul Sării revolt was an armed Székely rebellion in the Praid–Sovata region, a salt mining area near the town of Târgu Mureș corresponding to the Hungarian ethnographic region of Sóvidék (Hungarian for 'Salt Country'; Romanian: Ținutul Sării). It took place between 29 March and 6 April 1919, in territory held by the Romanian Army on behalf of the Directing Council, during the period in which Romanian forces were securing the Transylvanian demarcation line.

The rebellion arose from confusion surrounding the loyalty oath to the Romanian state demanded by the new authorities, compounded by the insurgents' mistaken belief that the Székely Division would provide military support. Participation was however limited, as only a handful of villages joined, fielding, according to Szekeres Lukács Sándor, no more than around 200 armed men. After an initial phase in which the local gendarmerie was overwhelmed, regular Romanian Army units intervened and suppressed the revolt.

The uprising resulted in 7 casualties during the revolt (4 Székely insurgents and 3 Romanian gendarmes), while a further 12 Székely civilians were executed or died in custody in its aftermath. Ferenc Laár, pastor of the Reformed church in Praid, played a significant role both in restraining Székely violence during the revolt and in the subsequent normalization of community life.

== Context ==
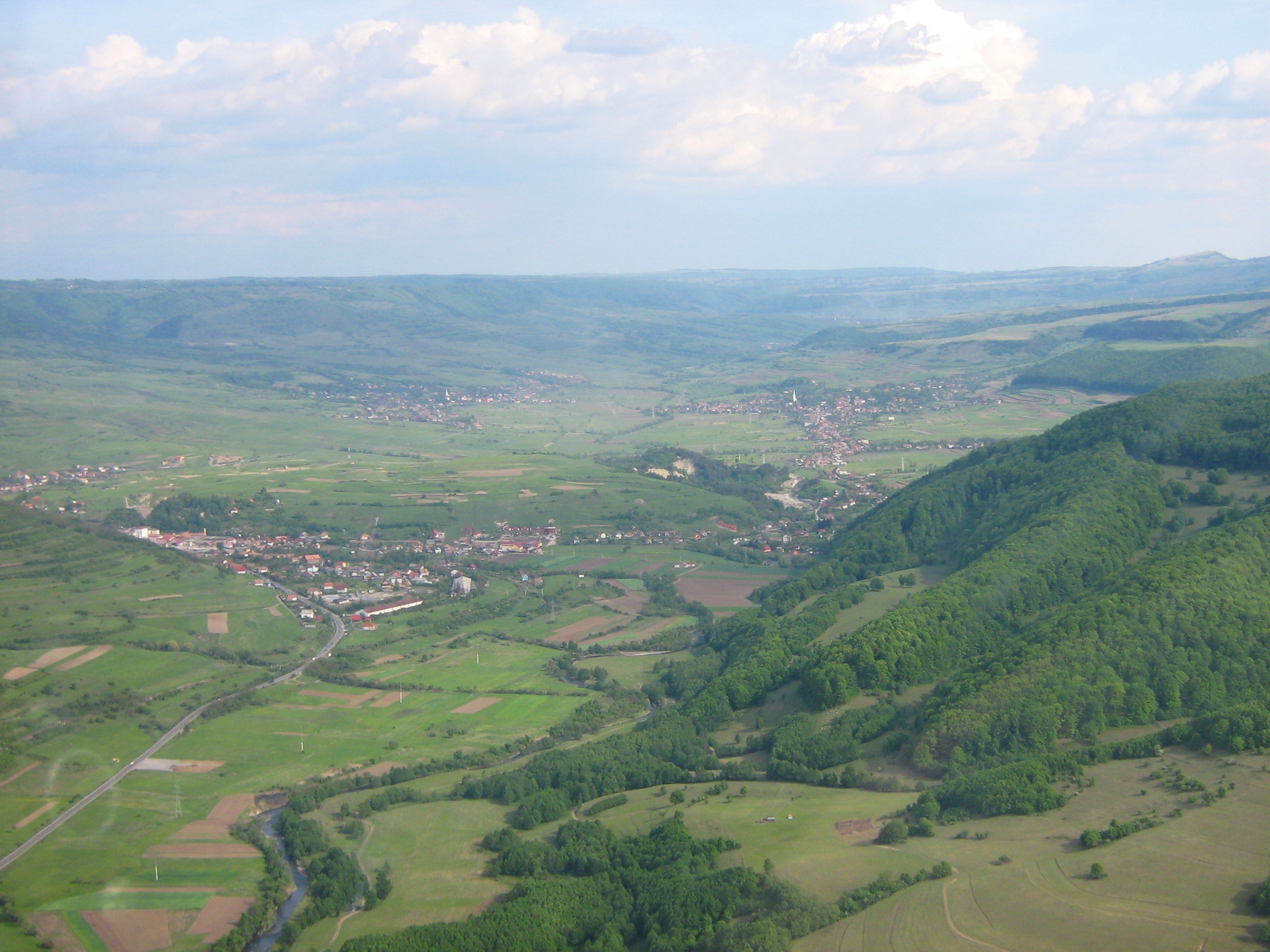
Valley of the Târnava Mică in the Praid area

=== Geographic ===
The "Salt Country" is located in the southeastern periphery of the Transylvanian Plateau. It lies in the valley of the Corund River and the upper valley of the Târnava Mică River, mostly in the Praid–Sovata depression. The area includes several localities, such as Sărățeni, Sovata, Praid, and Corund; in its center is Ocna de Sus.

=== Military and Political ===
In accordance with the Belgrade military convention of November 13, 1918, Székely Land entered the occupation zone of the Romanian Army. During the advance of the Romanian troops, the National Councils from Miercurea Ciuc (Csík County) and Odorheiu Secuiesc (Udvarhely County) did not plan or prepare any armed resistance, prohibiting this very thing. On December 15, the alignment provided as the demarcation line was reached. Along with the Romanian soldiers, gendarmes were also sent to the area (located in Sovata and Praid in number of 18). Although, in accordance with the armistice provisions, the Hungarian civil administration was supposed to manage the territory taken over by the Romanian troops, in January 1919 the Governing Council, located in Sibiu, began to take over state power, regarding the territories inhabited by the Székelys as part of the Romanian state. There was in January 1919 in Odorheiu Secuiesc an attempt to establish a Székely Republic, which however failed.

The military occupation was at the same time accompanied by the collection of weapons from the population, which was forced to surrender them. For example, in the first half of January, the gendarmes from Praid went to Corund for this, from house to house. However, not all weapons were collected, some of them being hidden by the local people.

According to Dr. Szekeres Lukács Sándor, alongside requisitions however, there were also thefts or kidnappings by the Romanian troops, as well as punishments ordered by the military authorities in the form of beatings (some even followed by deaths), applied to some members of the local population. These documents added to the unpleasant memories which, according to the same author, had been left by the Romanian troops on the spot, during the offensive of the Romanian Army in Transylvania in 1916.

== Prelude ==
Although the people had been repeatedly asked to surrender their weapons, a number of members of the population did not want to surrender them. They hoped for a national war that would drive out the Romanian troops, considered by the Székelys as invaders. On the other hand, the crossing of the second demarcation line in January 1919 by the Romanian Army determined a situation that could become very complicated, and on 1919, the Hungarian Council of Ministers decided for the first time that no more had another solution than armed resistance.

An appropriate moment to take action seemed to arise in the spring of 1919, when the idea of a local rebellion, coordinated with an attack by the troops of the Székely Division began to be floated. The coordinators of such a revolt, located in Târgu Mureș, would have relied on the military support of the Székely Division, support that it was not able to provide. As such, couriers were sent from the large unit to Târgu Mureș to communicate and clarify this.

In March 1919, the sabotages multiplied, so that the Romanian military officials became more intransigent. Also, Hungarian-language newspapers and magazines in Transylvania became increasingly difficult to obtain, while during the same period, postal items from Hungary were simply burned in the railway station at Cluj. As a consequence of the lack of accurate information, rumors multiplied, the most frequent theme of which was an alleged offensive by the Hungarian army. There were also rumors predicting a withdrawal of the Romanian troops. Among those who had effectively hidden their weapons was a group of 40 members led by one Andor Kovács, and his group was alerted by rumors that the Hungarian army would drive the troops away Romanian. Against this background, a telegram sent on 1919 to the station Dămieni, in which it was stated that the Romanian authorities no longer require the oath to the Romanian state from the railway workers railways by the Hungarian state, was interpreted as proof of the fact that the occupation of the Romanian troops was to end.

== Revolt ==
=== March 29–30 ===
That same day, Székely railway workers celebrated the news at the pub, announcing that Hungarian troops were coming. In the afternoon, a Romanian gendarme coming from Miercurea Nirajului carrying horses, was attacked near Eremitu by Székelys and wounded with a knife. The injured person was immediately taken to the doctor. At the same time, the news brought by the telegram spread rapidly in the upper valley of the Niraj.

On Nirajului Wednesday, Andor Kovács's group attacked the local gendarme station, they were captured and locked in a cellar. Couriers were later sent to the Nirajul Mare and Nirajul Mic valleys, to request the villagers to join the insurgency. They were given both the erroneous information that there is hope that the Székely Division will attack to free the area from Romanian troops, as well as the information about the wounded Romanian gendarme, whose weapon the rebels had taken.

In the oral history of the places, there is also the version of mysterious couriers from Cluj who were supposed to arrive in the area, to inform the locals that the action of the Székely Division had been countermanded.

The residents of the area did not react unitedly. Those from Mătrici headed towards Târgu Mureș, but seeing that those from Hodoșa did not join them, they returned to their homes. The villagers from Mărculeni and Candu, along with others, however, headed for the Sovata area.

=== March 31 ===
On 31 March at Eremitu, rioters stopped the local train coming from Praid, occupying the railway and shooting from the forest with guns. A group of about 100 rebels boarded the train and went to Sovata, where it arrived around 12 o'clock. Here, following a fight in which one of the Romanian gendarmes was killed and more many were injured, the group occupied the local gendarme post. The rebels later took control of the post office and the railway station, also capturing the 25 rifles found in the local weapons depot.

After occupying the public buildings in Sovata, reinforcements came to the Székelys from Sărățeni and a process of organizing the rebellion in the surrounding territory began. A detachment was sent to Praid, including men from Kovács Andor's group, with their weapons hidden in three carts. The group arrived in the locality around 4-5 pm and with the help of the residents managed to disarm the 12 Romanian gendarmes there in a few minutes. The only one who escaped was the lieutenant who commanded them, he fled through the Catholic cemetery. Later, however, he too was captured while moving towards Corund and being brought back to Praid, where the villagers were already organizing for defense. A patrol was organized to catch the Romanian soldiers who might have passed through the village. George Kovats, a rebel leader from Eremitu, proposed organizing a detachment to go to Târgu Mureș. From Praid, messengers went on horseback to the surrounding villages to raise them to battle, but without success, due to the lack of weapons. At the same time, people from the surrounding villages who had come to Praid began to return to their homes.

At that stage of the rebellion, the insurgents of Praid drew several conclusions, namely that: 1) the revolt covers only a few villages, 2) the peace of the inhabitants of Praid has been disturbed by foreigners, 3) a punitive expedition will surely follow, from Romanian troops. As such, the Romanian gendarmes already captured were to be kept as hostages. Also, armed guards were sent on the roads leading to Praid, so that foreign troops could not enter the village during the night.

Several Romanian gendarmes who were usually stationed in Praid, but had gone to Corund during the events mentioned above, wanted to return to the locality. Being summoned by the Székely guards defending the Pride to stop, they retaliated with their weapons. As a result, three of the defenders were wounded in the battle, and they died during the following morning of April 1.

=== April 1 ===
The death of the three own guards aroused the anger of the population of Praid, who wanted to execute the already captured Romanian gendarmes in the village square. Only the vigorous action of the pastor Ferenc Laár of the reformed church of Praid, prevented the execution of Romanian gendarmes held hostage. For fear that the attack of the Romanian troops would disturb the funeral ceremony, the three were buried on the same day. The funeral was attended by a large part of the local population, in the context of a general atmosphere of indignation and overexcitement.

On the same day, between Atid and Atia a new incident increased the number of victims. At Atid, a former Székely soldier returned from Russia recognized a former comrade in arms between 2 Romanian gendarmes who had been sent as couriers to Praid. Thus began a fight, as a result of which the two gendarmes were disarmed. As they started to escape towards Atia, those gendarmes were surrounded by the mob and lynched.

In the meantime, news began to arrive that large numbers of Romanian troops were to arrive in the area, and it began to emerge that the Hungarian troops would not act concretely to liberate the territory in question. For the intellectuals in the area who had been able to use the telephone to make contact with the neighboring towns, it became obvious that the size of the revolt was of small amplitude and that it was taking place only in a few villages, being initiated as a result of some erroneous information. As such, they tried to temper the zeal of the insurgents and take care of the security of the detained Romanian gendarmes.

== Reaction of the Romanian army ==
=== April 2 ===
About 200 soldiers and 30 gendarmes were sent to the Niraj valley and to the Praid-Sovata depression. There were clashes with the insurgents in Dămieni and Eremitu, resulting in injuries. Also, a battalion previously sent to Odorhei as a result of existing concern over the possibility of a Bolshevik rebellion was redirected to the depression. There was no other armed resistance, so upon arrival, the soldiers of the battalion had only the task of finding out who the culprits were for what happened, finding them and catching them to be handed over to the authorities.

With this aim, according to Szekeres Lukács Sándor, the Romanian units adopted intimidation tactics, marching with the whole force and artillery through the villages. Having done this at Corund, by order of the commanding officer with the rank of Colonel, artillery was placed in positions on the slopes of Calonda, with the aim of threatening Corund. Dressed in robes, parish priest Mihály Hadnagy together with teacher Knopp Vencel set out to persuade the officers of the unit to "save the village", while the commanding officer demanded the surrender of the culprits. Many of the insurgents, however, in the following days fled, either hiding armed in the forests, or taking advantage of the winter conditions in another way to hide.

A delegation consisting of Catholic priest Béla Kicsid from Praid, pastor calvin Ferenc Laár, school principal Mihály Kovács and teacher György Kakucs, prepared to start the steps in order to mitigate the predictable harshness of the intervention of the Romanian troops. The delegation waited until 7 pm, the Romanian troops arriving in Praid village at night.

=== April 3–6 ===
On April 3, the arrests began, under the command of a lieutenant-colonel, being detained and interrogated in the gendarmerie premises (according to Szekeres Lukács Sándor including the use of violent methods, which led to the death of 4 people), 80 inhabitants of Praid. In the following days, all those detained from the surrounding localities (Matrici, Sovata, Ocna de Sus, Corund) were also directed to Praid.

In the morning of April 6, one of the main defendants, Gagyi Lázár, who had tried to mobilize the residents of Şiklod to revolt, managed to escape. On the same day, the execution of Dénes Farkas, guilty of the shooting wounding of the Romanian lieutenant Donetea on March 31 in Praid, was announced. In order to witness this, the population was brought to the town square of Praid. After the reading of the sentence and its motivation, the convict, the soldiers and the population went to the Catholic cemetery, where Dénes Farkas was executed by shooting. Pál G. Dénes from Sovata was also sentenced to death.

Other arrests related to the events in the Sovata-Praid Depression were made in the territory of Odorhei County, including in his town of residence, until 1919. These defendants were investigated at Odorheiu Secuiesc. In Dămieni, between 30 and 40 people were punished with beatings for participating in the riot. 5 more death sentences were also handed down for what happened in Atid.

== Epilogue ==
At Praid, the units of the Romanian army remained for 3 weeks. There were prison sentences during that period. Most of those involved in the rebellion, however they hid, some of the insurgents staying for a long time in the forests or other parts (even a year and a half, or up to 2–3 years) until the declaration of an amnesty. 29 arrested were in captivity for several months, during the detention 2 of those arrested died.

Under the threat of harsh punishments, including collective ones, the population was announced to surrender all the weapons and ammunition of war, remaining from the former Austro-Hungarian army.

The final balance of the events traced in the archives indicates a total of 1,000 participants in the events. Of this total, 200 were the number of armed Székelys. The direct victims were represented by 4 Székely civilians and 3 Romanian gendarmes, the total of indirect victims later rising to 12, all being Székely civilians.

== Memories ==
In memory of the deceased corporal Florea Constantin from the Mureș Gendarmerie, who fell victim to duty, being killed by the Székely revolutionaries on March 31. The inscription on the tombstone located at the grave of the deceased Romanian gendarme, located to the right of the entrance to the former Greek-Catholic cemetery in Sovata Today, the cross from the head of gendarme corporal Florea Constantin, who died at the age of 25 in Sovata on March 31, 1919, has monument status.

The remains of Dénes Farkas were moved to Sărățeni in 1941, during the period when Northern Transylvania was under Hungarian rule. A stone cross exists today at the site of his former temporary grave.

== Bibliography ==
- Știrban, Marcel; Iancu, Gheorghe; Țepelea, Ioan; Racovițan, Mihai; Cap. IV Unirea și desăvârșirea statului național unitar (arhivă) în Istoria României. Transilvania. Vol. II; Ed. Gheorghe Barițiu; Cluj-Napoca; 1997
- Szekeres Lukács Sándor; A sóvidéki lázadás 1919 tavaszán (1919. márc 29.-április 6.); Hazanezo, XXII. évfolyam 1. szám 2011; pp. 18–23
- Eby, Cecil D. (2007). Hungary at War: Civilians and Soldiers in World War II. University Park: Penn State University Press. ISBN 9780271040882.
- Grecu, Dan (1995). "The Romanian military occupation of Hungary, April 1919 – March 1920". Romanian Postal History Bulletin. 5 (2): 14–35. OCLC 752328222.
- Iancu, Gheorghe (1995). The Ruling Council: The Integration of Transylvania into Romania. Bibliotheca Rerum Transsilvaniae. Vol. 8. Cluj-Napoca: Center for Transylvanian Studies. ISBN 9789739132787. OCLC 750927127.
- Mărdărescu, Gheorghe D. (2009). Campania pentru desrobirea Ardealului și ocuparea Budapestei, 1918–1920 (in Romanian). Bucharest: Editura Militară. ISBN 9789733207948.
- Torrey, Glenn E. (2011). The Romanian Battlefront in World War I. University Press of Kansas. ISBN 9780700620173.
