= List of Hungarian exonyms (Mureș County) =

This is a list of Hungarian names for towns and communes in Mureș County, Transylvania, Romania.

Hungarian name	Romanian name
Ádámos	Adămuș
Ákosfalva	Acățari
Alsóbölkény	Beica de Jos
Alsóidecs	Ideciu de Jos
Alsóköhér	Chiheru de Jos
Apold	Apold
Backamadaras	Păsăreni
Bala	Băla
Balavásár	Bălăușeri
Bátos	Batoș
Beresztelke	Breaza
Blidirászaházcsoport	Blidireasa
Bonyha	Bahnea
Bordos	Bordoșiu
Búzaháza	Grâușorul
Disznópatak	Brădețelu
Bözöd	Bezid
Bözödújfalu	Bezidu Nou
Cintos	Ațintiș
Csatófalva	Viișoara
Csíkfalva	Vărgata
Dános	Daneș
Déda	Deda
Demiháza	Dămieni
Disznajó	Vălenii de Mureș
Dulcsa	Dulcea
Erdőlibánfalva	Ibănești-Pădure
Erdőszentgyörgy	Sângeorgiu de Pădure
Faragó	Fărăgău
Fehéregyháza	Albești
Felsőrépa	Vătava
Gernyeszeg	Gornești
Gödemesterháza	Stânceni
Görgényhodák	Hodac
Görgényoroszfalu	Solovăstru
Görgényszentimre	Gurghiu
Gyulakuta	Fântânele
Havad	Neaua
Havadtő	Viforoasa
Héjjasfalva	Vânători
Ikland	Icland
Jedd	Livezeni
Jobbágyfalva	Valea
Jobbágytelke	Sâmbriaș
Kerelőszentpál	Sânpaul
Kibéd	Chibed
Kisikland	Iclănzel
Kóródszentmárton	Coroisânmărtin
Kozmatelke	Cozma
Köszvényes	Matrici
Kutyfalva	Cuci
Küküllőszéplak	Suplac
Laposnyatelep	Lăpușna
Libánfalva	Ibănești
Lóc	Lotu
Lukafalva	Gheorghe Doja
Magyarbükkös	Bichiș
Magyaró	Aluniș
Magyarózd	Ozd
Makfalva	Ghindari
Marosbogát	Bogata
Marosfelfalu	Suseni
Maroskece	Chețani
Maroskeresztúr	Cristești
Marosludas	Luduş
Marossárpatak	Glodeni
Marosoroszfalu	Rușii-Munți
Marosszentanna	Sântana de Mureș
Marosszentgyörgy	Sângeorgiu de Mureș
Marosszentkirály	Sâncraiu de Mureș
Marosugra	Ogra
Marosvásárhely	Târgu-Mureș
Marosvécs	Brâncovenești
Mezőbánd	Band
Mezőbodon	Papiu Ilarian
Mezőceked	Valea Largă
Mezőcsávás	Ceuașu de Câmpie
Mezőgerebenes	Grebenișu de Câmpie
Mezőkirályfalva	Crăiești
Mezőmadaras	Mădăraș
Mezőméhes	Miheșu de Câmpie
Mezőpagocsa	Pogăceaua
Mezőpanit	Pănet
Mezőrücs	Râciu
Mezősályi	Șăulia
Mezősámsond	Șincai
Mezőszengyel	Sânger
Mezőtóhát	Tăureni
Mezőzáh	Zau de Câmpie
Mikefalva	Mica
Mikháza	Călugăreni, Mureș
Nagyernye	Ernei
Nagysármás	Sărmaşu
Nyárádgálfalva	Găleşti
Nyárádkarácson	Crăciunești
Nyárádmagyarós	Măgherani
Nyárádremete	Eremitu
Nyárádselye	Șilea
Nyárádszentlászló	Sânvăsii
Nyárádszentmárton	Mitresti
Nyárádszereda	Miercurea Nirajului
Nyárádtő	Ungheni
Nyomát	Maiad
Oláhkocsárd	Cucerdea
Palotailva	Lunca Bradului
Petele	Petelea
Radnót	Iernut
Ratosnya	Răstolița
Rava	Roua
Rigmány	Rigmani
Segesvár	Sighişoara
Sóvárad	Sărățeni
Szászbogács	Băgaciu
Sziródrész	Pârâu Mare
Szakadát	Săcădat
Szentháromság	Troița, Mureș
Székelybós	Bozeni
Szászkézd	Saschiz
Szásznádas	Nadeș
Szászrégen	Reghin
Székelybere	Bereni
Székelyhodos	Hodoșa
Székelymoson	Moșuni
Székelysárd	Șardu Nirajului
Székelyvécke	Vețca
Szováta	Sovata
Tancs	Tonciu
Tekeújfalu	Lunca
Tyiró	Tireu
Tyiszó	Tisieu
Uzdiszentpéter	Sânpetru de Câmpie
Vadad	Vadu
Vajdaszentivány	Voivodeni
Vámosgálfalva	Găneşti
Vámosudvarhely	Odrihei
Vármező	Câmpu Cetății
Zágor	Zagăr
Zimc	Zimţi
