= Castra of Călugăreni =

Fort in the Roman province of Dacia

- Castra of Eremitu
- Location within Romania
- 46.626722°N 24.876347°E
- Location: Ținutul cetății (Hungarian: Vártartomány) / Cetatea veche (Hungarian: Óvár), Călugăreni, Mureș, Romania

History
- Founded: 2nd century AD
- Abandoned: 3rd century AD

Site notes
- Excavation dates: 1960, 2004
- Archaeologists: Károly Benkő; Balázs Orbán; F. Kovács; Dumitru Protase; Nicoleta Man
- Discovered: 1960
- Condition: Ruined

The Castra of Călugăreni was a fort in the Roman province of Dacia located on the north-western periphery of the modern village of Călugăreni, Romania. The fort was built in the 2nd century AD and abandoned in the 3rd century. Archaeological research also proved the existence of a nearby canabae.

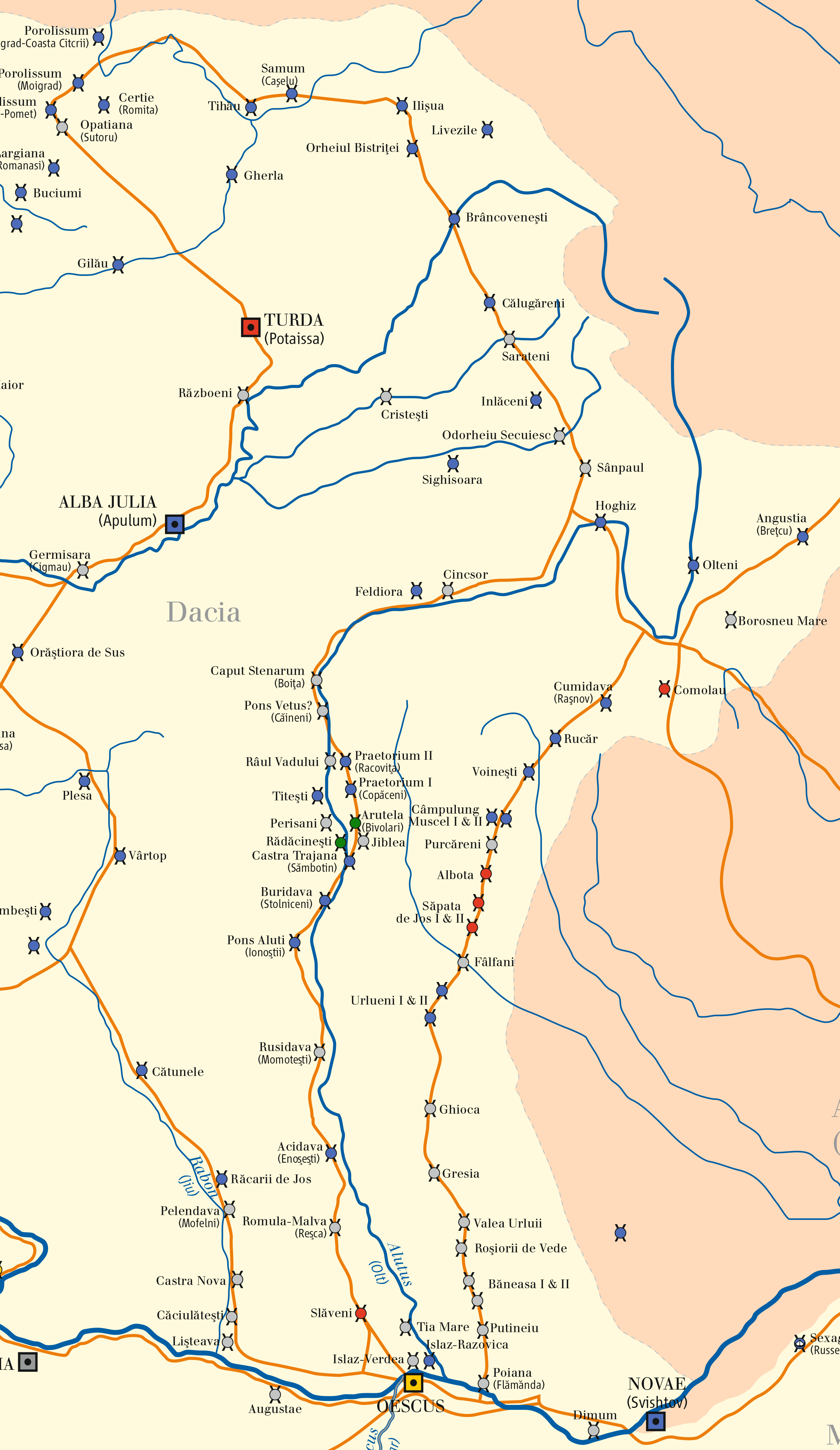
Limes Alutanus + Transalutanus

== Location ==
The fort is situated on the southern bank of the river Niraj at an altitude of around 445 m above sea level. In Roman times it was located in the province Dacia Superior on the eastern limes road between the forts of Brâncovenești in the north and Sărățeni in the southeast. Using a chain of watchtowers and exploiting the natural barriers of the mountains near Gurghiu and Carpathian Mountains of Târnava Mică, its garrison had the task of securing the upper Niraj's valley and the valley of Săcădat, through which traffic routes used since pre-Roman times led to the Barbaricum.

== History of research ==
The fort was first described in the early 18th century by Luigi Ferdinando Marsigli, who was also the first to produce a topographic map. At the end of the 18th century and at the beginning of the 19th century (1733, 1778, 1787, 1830 and 1842) the site was repeatedly mentioned in several newspapers. The first information about excavations in this area was published by Károly Benkő 1868. He also mentioned for the first time at least halfway correctly the size of the fort with 170 by 150 steps. In the same year, Balázs Orbán measured the area and came up with 210 times 160 steps, but explicitly pointed out the rounded corners with towers and two gates. The first excavations, documented at least summarily by F. Deák, took place in 1878 under the direction of F. Kovács. During these excavations parts of the porta principalis sinistra (left side gate) were found. In addition, a roughly hewn, lying sandstone lion one metre long and a fragmentary inscription were discovered at a depth of two metres. The scientists of the late 19th century published mainly to the already published data or added smaller details.

The publications from the first half of the 20th century mainly dealt with the history of Roman Dacia and the military history of the region, as well as with the connecting road known as the Trajan Road and, above all, with a building still visible at that time that was interpreted as a thermal spa. At that time, it was believed that the canals connecting the bathhouse with the Niraj were also used to drain the thermal baths. During his exploration of the eastern Limes in 1942, István Paulovics visited Călugăreni and, based on his precise field observations, drew up an exact topographical plan of the site. The first systematic archaeological investigations of the military site were carried out in 1961 by Dumitru Protase. Most of the other publications up to the end of the 20th century were based on existing knowledge, without adding anything new. This did not change until 2004, when Nicoleta Man began her many years of research into the site (see literature and web links below).

In the years between 2013 and 2015, an interdisciplinary research team, coordinated by the Winckelmann Institute of the Humboldt University of Berlin, the University of Cologne, the University of Pécs, the Budapest University of Technology and Economics, the Eötvös Loránd University, Budapest, the Erfurt University of Applied Sciences, the “Babeș-Bolyai” University of Cluj and the “Petru Maior“ university, investigated the area of Călugăreni as part of an Erasmus Intensive Program. Geophysical and field archaeological investigations were carried out by the Winckelmann Institute to clarify important settlement and building structures.

In the meantime, the fort and the vicus area as well as the thermal baths have been placed under monumental protection. Since 2008 various projects have been and are being carried out in international cooperation for the research, preservation and presentation of the monuments on the eastern border of Roman Dacia in the fields of air archaeology, geophysics, building history, topography and systematic research excavations at the Roman garrison from this site.

== Finds ==
The fort of Călugăreni had a rectangular perimeter of 163 m by 141 m (equivalent to 2.3 hectares) and was surrounded by a triple wall and trench system. Two construction phases were identified. At first the military camp was built in a wood-earth construction, later the defensive wall was replaced by a stone wall. The praetorial front was oriented to the east, towards the border running through the Carpathians. The road leading in from the west surrounded the fort on its northern side and must have led further east. Inside the camp the geophysical features of the principia (staff building), the praetorium (commander's residence), a horreum (storage building) and various crew barracks could be determined. During the excavation in 2004, six contubernia of one of these barracks were uncovered. The civil settlement, the vicus, extended to the west of the fort. The densely built and parallel strip houses were oriented towards the main street, which came from the interior of the province. The main road was crossed in the vicus area by three smaller side roads leading north towards the Niraj stream. On one of these side streets, where it approached the brook, massive building structures could be found, which were identified as thermal baths.

Based on the results of geophysical prospection, a total of three excavation sections were completed in 2013 in the areas of the principia, the vicus and the stream. In the principia three rooms at the back and the rear part of the basilica were excavated. The largest of the three rooms had a solid mortar floor and an apsidal rear wall, so that it could be addressed as a flag sanctuary. Fire layers were found in the basilica and several finds came to light, including parts of scale armor and a scale as well as an iron lamp. A larger building, whose function remained unclear, seems to have stood at the intersection of the main and one of the side streets. Particularly due to high quality finds such as terra sigillata shards, fragments of glass vessels and windows, the part of an amber ring, a glass ring and terracotta fragments, this area seems to have been an outstanding residential area within the vicus. The third cut in the area of the stream was intended to clarify whether the building was the thermal baths of the vicus. The surface finds, including fragments of hypocaust bricks, had given rise to this suspicion. This assumption could be confirmed by sounding, during which numerous pillars of a hypocaust system and some tegula mammata (wall tiles used in baths) were found.

Excavations in these areas continued in 2015. In the principia, a wooden predecessor building was identified, so that there are definitely at least two construction phases. There were again numerous small finds in layers of debris above the younger building, including a rare iron handcuff and many bronze and iron militaria. In the vicus area the building complex was further investigated. The areas of river pebbles in different structures, which were found already in 2013, were found again. They have straight borders and are arranged at right angles to each other. It is not yet clear whether these are internal floors or external running horizons. The buildings were wooden constructions with roofs covered with organic materials. In the thermal baths other rooms were uncovered, some of which were hypocaust. Fragments of wall plaster confirmed the once colored painting of their walls.

== Garrison ==
The troops stationed at Călugăreni included:

- A vexillation of Legio XIII Gemina;
- Cohors I Alpinorum equitata; and
- Cohors I Augusta Ituraeorum.

Furthermore, the Cohors I Ubiorum equitata is thought was stationed in this fort.

== Exhibition ==
In 2015, through cooperation between local and regional authorities, it was possible to put an end to agricultural use on a few hectares of farmland and to start designing an archaeological park (Parcul Arheologic de la Călugăreni). The Muzeul Județean Mureș/Mureș County Museum manages the park. Since its inauguration, information panels have informed visitors about the main features of the site and, since 2016, two wooden buildings known as Time Box Pavilions have housed a permanent exhibition.

== See also ==
- List of castra
