= Gălești =

Găleşti may refer to:

- Găleşti, Străşeni, a commune in Străşeni district, Moldova
- Gălești, Mureș, a commune in Mureș County, Romania
