= Torba =

Torba may refer to:

== Places ==
- Torba, Bodrum, a village in Turkey
- Torba Province, Vanuatu
- Torba, a village in Măgherani Commune, Mureș County, Romania
- Torba, a frazione of Gornate Olona, Varese, Italy

== Other uses ==
- Torba, a cement-like material used for example in the construction of the Skorba Temples, Malta
- Torba, a 2015 album by the hip hop group EarthGang

== See also ==
- Tarbha, Orissa, India
