= Hodoșa (river) =

Hodoșa Hodos
- Location within Romania

Location
- Country: Romania
- Counties: Mureș County
- Villages: Hodoșa, Vărgata

Physical characteristics
- Source: Gurghiu Mountains
- Mouth: Niraj
  - location: Mitrești
  - coordinates: 46.5875°N 24.8086°E
- Length: 12 km (7.5 mi)
- Basin size: 40 km^{2} (15 sq mi)

Basin features
- Progression: Niraj→ Mureș→ Tisza→ Danube→ Black Sea

The Hodoșa (Hungarian: Hodos, Hungarian pronunciation: [ˈhodoʃ], meaning Beavery) is a right tributary of the river Niraj in Romania. It discharges into the Niraj in Mitrești. Its length is 12 km (7.5 mi) and its basin size is 40 km^{2} (15 sq mi).
