= Vaia (river) =

- Location within Romania

Location
- Country: Romania
- Counties: Mureș County
- Villages: Suveica, Găiești, Vălenii

Physical characteristics
- Mouth: Niraj
  - location: Acățari
  - coordinates: 46.4703°N 24.6483°E
- Length: 10 km (6.2 mi)
- Basin size: 35 km^{2} (14 sq mi)

Basin features
- Progression: Niraj→ Mureș→ Tisza→ Danube→ Black Sea

The Vaia is a left tributary of the river Niraj in Romania. Near Acățari it flows into the Vețca canal, which discharges into the Niraj in Cinta. Its length is 10 km (6.2 mi) and its basin size is 35 km^{2} (14 sq mi).
