= Erasmus Julius Nyárády =

Romanian botanist of Hungarian ethnicity

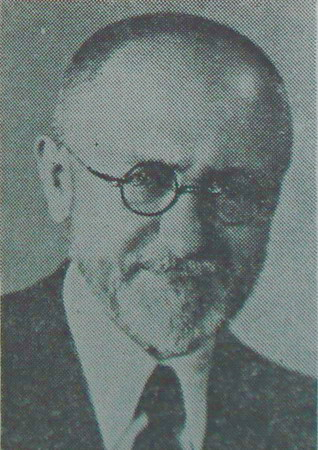
- Born: 7 April 1881; Nyárádtő, Transylvania
- Died: 10 June 1966 (aged 85)
- Scientific career
- Author abbrev. (botany): Nyár.; Nyar.

Erasmus Julius Nyárády (7 April 1881 - 10 June 1966) was a Romanian botanist of Hungarian ethnicity. In the Hungarian style his name appears as Nyárády Erazmus Gyula. He was born in Transylvania, in a town then called in Hungarian: Nyárádtő, in Romanian: Nirașteu, now known as Ungheni, Mureș.

== Career ==
After secondary school education in Târgu Mureș (Hungarian: Marosvásárhely), he attended the Teacher Training Institute in Cluj-Napoca (Hungarian: Kolozsvár, German: Klausenburg) (1900). He then studied at the Natural History Teachers' College in Budapest, graduating from the Faculty of Geography in 1904. He spent the next seven years teaching in the gymnasium of Kežmarok (Hungarian: Késmárk), then in 1911 moved back to Târgu Mureș. Meanwhile, he had begun to publish botanical papers, and in 1922 he was invited by the Romanian botanist Alexandru Borza to be curator of the Cluj-Napoca Botanical Garden, with a remit to expand the herbarium.

Between 1940 and 1944 together with Rezső Soó he published his 9-volume Kolozsvár és környékének flórája (Flora of Cluj and its environment). In 1942 he nominally retired, but did not stop his work. In 1948, the Romanian Academy elected him as a full member, and appointed him as member of the editorial board of the monumental Flora Reipublicae Socialisticae România, under the management of Traian Săvulescu, Editor in chief. He was volume coordinator for volumes VIII-XI, after the death of Săvulescu.

In 1953 he was awarded the Romanian People's Republic State Prize. He died in Budapest, and is buried in Cluj-Napoca (Romania) in the Házsongárdi Cemetery.

== Some publications ==
- Vizek és vízben bővelkedő talajok növényzetéről a Hargitában, 1929
- Marosvásárhely és környékén élő tavaszi és nyáreleji növények meghatározó könyve, Marosvásárhely, 1937
- A tordai hasadék monografikus ismertetése, Erdélyi Nemzeti Múzeum Növénytára, Kolozsvár, 1940-1944
- Kolozsvár és környékének flórája I-IX. füzet, B., Soó Rezső közreműködésével, Kolozsvár, 1941-1944
- Flora of Romania (Flora Reipublicae Socialisticae România) vol. I-XIII, Academia Republicii Socialiste România, Bucharest, 1952-1976
- Flora şi vegetaţia Munţilor Retezat, Academia Republicii Populare Române, 1958
- Szováta fürdő és környékének monográfiája (manuscript)

=== Taxa named after him ===
- (Brassicaceae) Alyssum nyaradyi Bornm. & Gauba
- (Poaceae) Koeleria nyaradyi Ujhelyi
- (Salicaceae) Salix nyaradyi Woł.

== Sources ==
- Váczy, C. 1967. Erasmus Julius Nyárády, 1881-1966. Taxon 16 ( 5): 425-430
