= Nirajul Mic (Câmpu Cetății) =

- Location within Romania

Location
- Country: Romania
- Counties: Mureș County

Physical characteristics
- Source: Gurghiu Mountains
- Mouth: Niraj
  - location: Câmpu Cetății
  - coordinates: 46.6742°N 25.0194°E
- Length: 15 km (9.3 mi)
- Basin size: 25 km^{2} (9.7 sq mi)

Basin features
- Progression: Niraj→ Mureș→ Tisza→ Danube→ Black Sea

The Nirajul Mic (Hungarian: Kis-Nyárád, Hungarian pronunciation: [ˈkiʃɲaːraːd], meaning Small Poplar) is the left headwater of the river Niraj in Transylvania, Romania. It joins the Nirajul Mare in the village of Câmpu Cetății to form the Niraj. Its length is 15 km (9.3 mi) and its basin size is 25 km^{2} (9.7 sq mi).

This river should not be confused with the Nirajul Mic, having the same name, but joining the Niraj near the city of Miercurea Nirajului
