= Niraj =

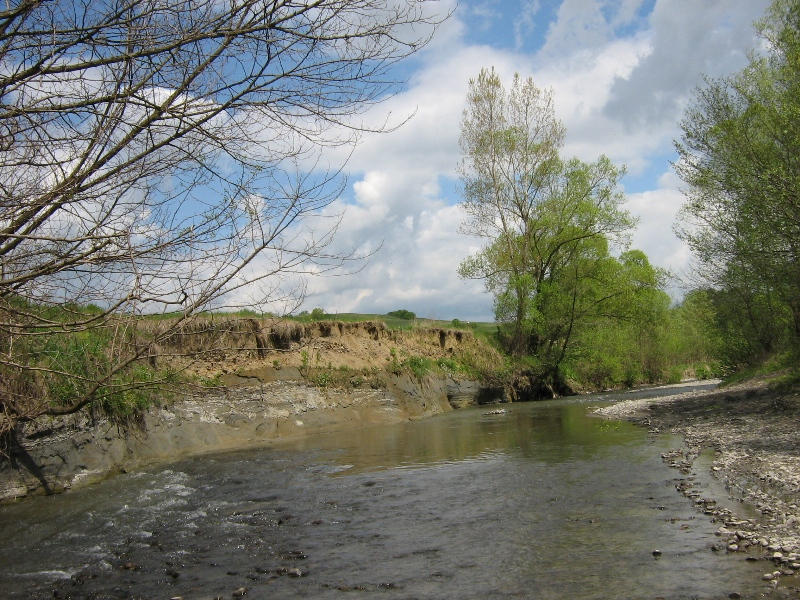

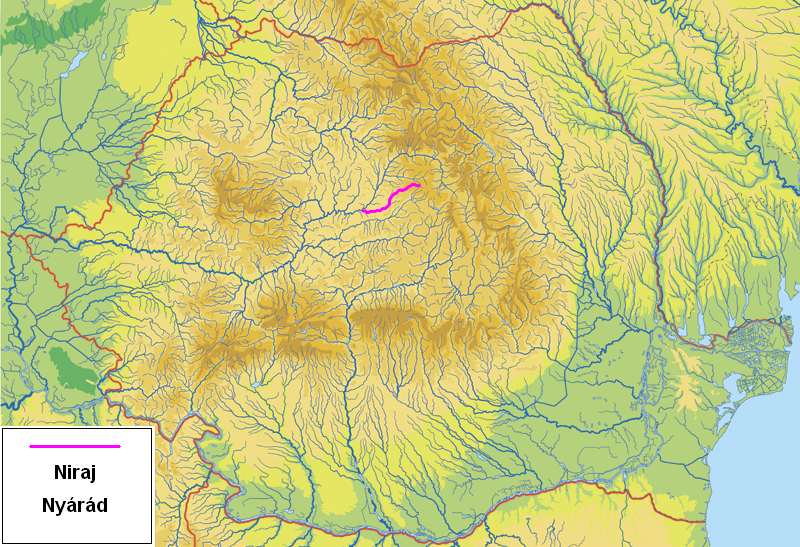
- Native name: Nyárád (Hungarian); Niersch (German)

Location
- Country: Romania
- Counties: Mureș County
- Towns: Miercurea Nirajului, Ungheni

Physical characteristics
- Source: confluence of headwaters Nirajul Mare and Nirajul Mic.
  - location: Сâmpu Cetății
  - coordinates: 46.6742°N 25.0194°E
- Mouth: Mureș
  - location: near Ungheni
  - coordinates: 46.481°N 24.427°E
- Length: 82 km (51 mi)
- Basin size: 651 km^{2} (251 sq mi)

Basin features
- Progression: Mureș→ Tisza→ Danube→ Black Sea

The Niraj (Hungarian: Nyárád; German: Niersch) is a river in the Gurghiu Mountains, Mureș County, northern Romania. Its name originates from the Hungarian word nyár, meaning "poplar". It is a left tributary of the river Mureș. It starts at the confluence of headwaters Nirajul Mare and Nirajul Mic. It flows through the villages Câmpu Cetății, Eremitu, Mătrici, Călugăreni, Dămieni, Grâușorul, Vărgata, Miercurea Nirajului, Dumitreștii, Gălești, Bolintineni, Păsăreni, Murgești, Acățari, Stejeriș, Crăciunești, Ilieni, Gheorghe Doja, Leordeni and joins the Mureș in Vidrasău, near the town Ungheni. Its length is 82 km (51 mi) (including its source river Nirajul Mare) and its basin size is 651 km^{2} (251 sq mi).

== Tributaries ==
The following rivers are tributaries to the river Niraj (from source to mouth):

- Left: Nirajul Mic, Hosu, Călugăreni, Nirajul Mic, Niaroș, Vaia, Pârâul Mare, Tirimia, Cerghid
- Right: Nirajul Mare, Diceal, Ciadou, Hodoșa, Vărgata, Valea spre Șardu, Maiad
