= Cerghid =

Cerghid Cserked-patak
- Location within Romania

Location
- Country: Romania
- Counties: Mureș County
- Villages: Cerghid

Physical characteristics
- Mouth: Niraj
  - location: Ungheni
  - coordinates: 46.4786°N 24.4426°E
- Length: 10 km (6.2 mi)
- Basin size: 28 km^{2} (11 sq mi)

Basin features
- Progression: Niraj→ Mureș→ Tisza→ Danube→ Black Sea
- River code: IV.1.67.12

The Cerghid (Hungarian: Cserked, Cserked-patak) is a left tributary of the river Niraj in Transylvania, Romania. It joins the Niraj near Ungheni. Its length is 10 km (6.2 mi) and its basin size is 28 km^{2} (11 sq mi).
