= Miercurea =

Miercurea (Romanian for "[The] Wednesday") starts off the names of several places in Romania:

- Miercurea Ciuc
- Miercurea Nirajului
- Miercurea Sibiului
