= Valea spre Șardu =

- Location within Romania

Location
- Country: Romania
- Counties: Mureș County
- Villages: Moșuni, Șardu Nirajului, Tâmpa

Physical characteristics
- Source: Gurghiu Mountains
- Mouth: Niraj
  - location: Gălești
  - coordinates: 46.5161°N 24.7672°E
- Length: 8 km (5.0 mi)
- Basin size: 27 km^{2} (10 sq mi)

Basin features
- Progression: Niraj→ Mureș→ Tisza→ Danube→ Black Sea
- Tributaries
  - right: Valea Moșuni, Valea Recea

The Valea spre Șardu is a right tributary of the river Niraj in Romania. It flows into the Niraj in Gălești. Its length is 8 km (5.0 mi) and its basin size is 27 km^{2} (10 sq mi).
