= Hodoșa =

Hodoșa Székelyhodos
- Commune
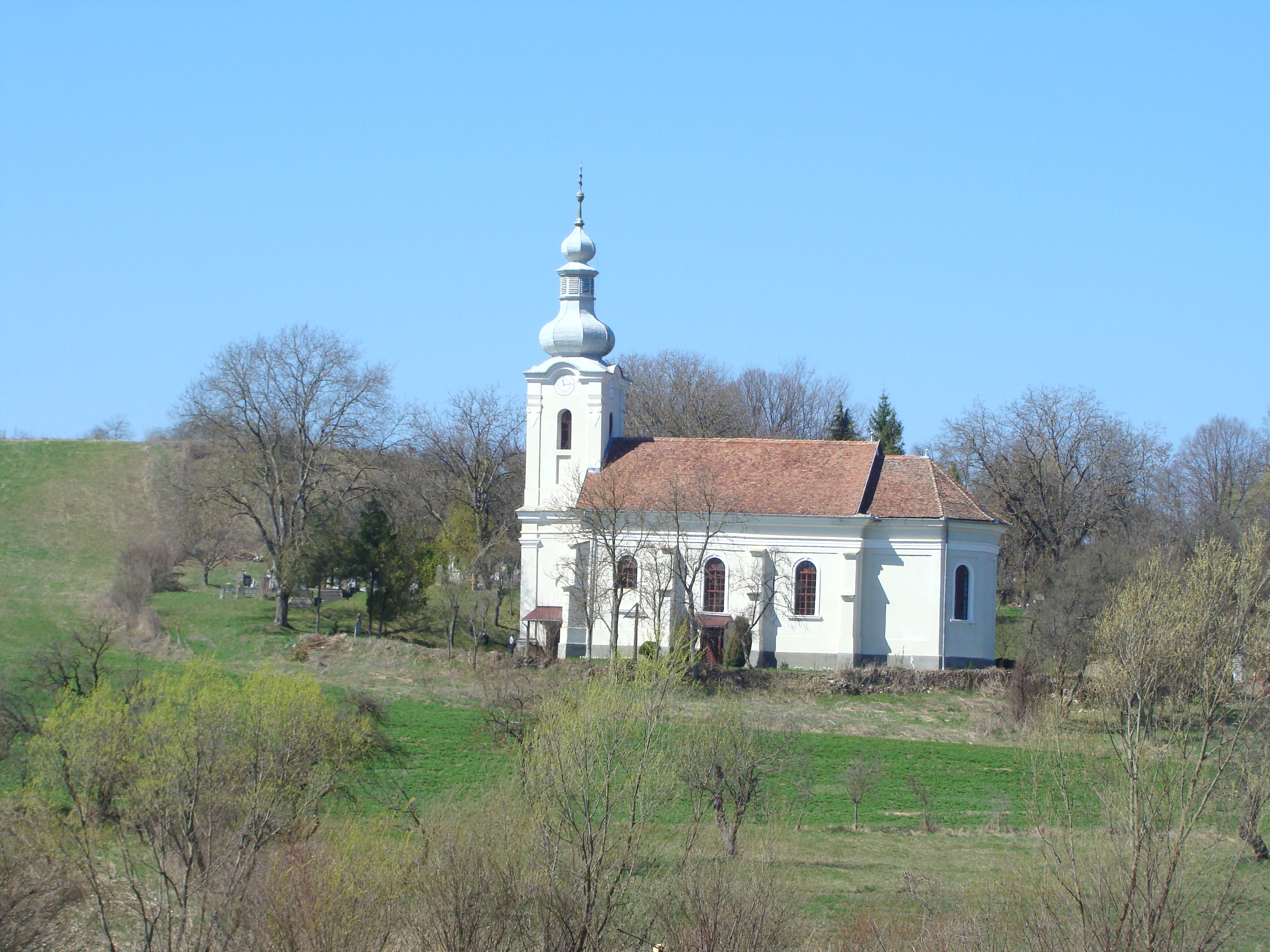
- Catholic church in Hodoșa

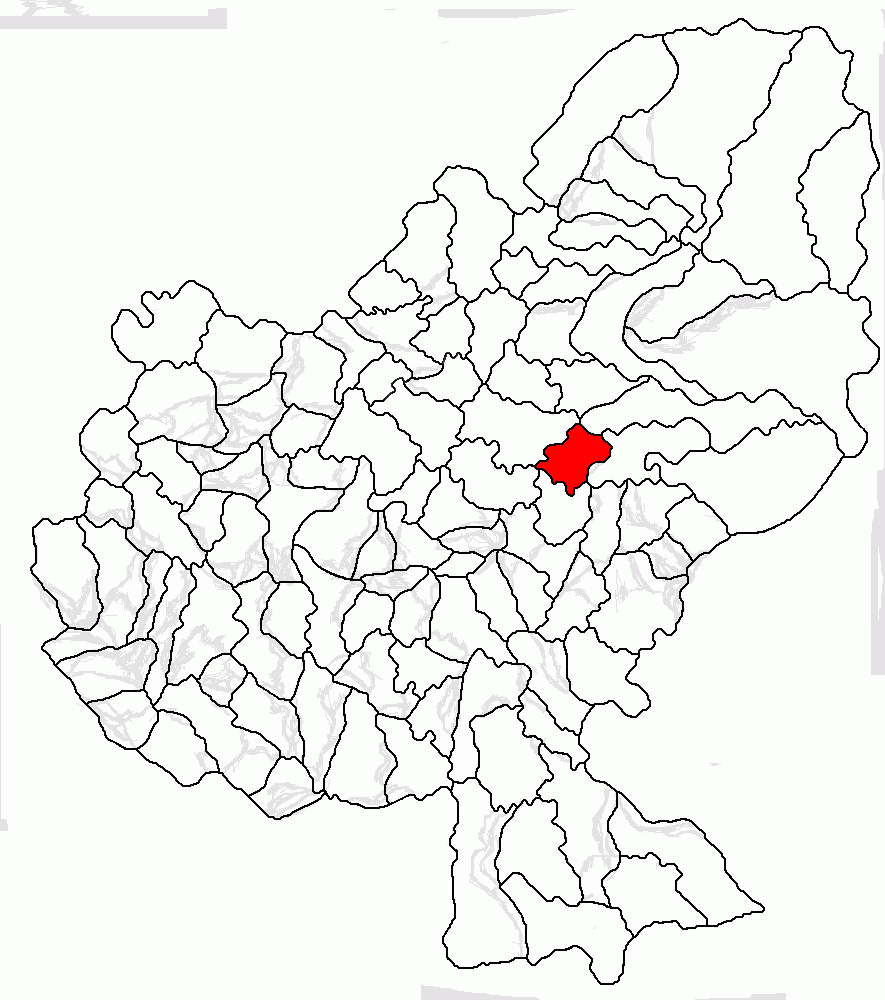
- Location in Mureș County

- Location in Romania
- Coordinates: 46°38′N 24°49′E
- Country: Romania
- County: Mureș

Government
  - Mayor (2020–2024): Otto Barabási (UDMR)
- Area: 39.48 km^{2} (15.24 sq mi)
- Elevation: 411 m (1,348 ft)
- Population (2021-12-01): 1,179
  - Density: 29.86/km^{2} (77.35/sq mi)
- Time zone: UTC+02:00 (EET)
  - Summer (DST): UTC+03:00 (EEST)
- Postal code: 547320
- Area code: (+40) 0265
- Vehicle reg.: MS
- Website: www.hodosa.ro

Hodoșa (Hungarian: Székelyhodos or colloquially Hodos, Hungarian pronunciation: [ˈseːkɛjhodoʃ]) is a commune in Mureș County, Transylvania, Romania composed of four villages: Hodoșa, Ihod (Ehed), Isla (Iszló), and Sâmbriaș (Jobbágytelke).

== Geography ==
The commune is situated on the Transylvanian Plateau, at an altitude of 411 m (1,348 ft), on the banks of the river Hodoșa. It is located in the central part of Mureș County, 14 km (8.7 mi) north of the town of Miercurea Nirajului and 30 km (19 mi) northeast of the county seat, Târgu Mureș.

== History ==
The locality formed part of the Székely Land region of the historical Transylvania province. Until 1918, the village belonged to the Maros-Torda County of the Kingdom of Hungary. In the aftermath of World War I and the Hungarian–Romanian War of 1918–1919, it passed under Romanian administration; after the Treaty of Trianon of 1920, like the rest of Transylvania, Hodoșa became part of the Kingdom of Romania. During the interwar period, it fell within Plasa Miercurea Niraj of Mureș County during the interwar period. In 1940, the Second Vienna Award granted Northern Transylvania to Hungary and the village was held by Hungary until October 1944. After Soviet occupation, the Romanian administration returned and the commune became officially part of Romania in March 1945. Between 1952 and 1960, the commune fell within the Magyar Autonomous Region, between 1960 and 1968 the Mureș-Magyar Autonomous Region. In 1968, the region was abolished, and since then, the settlement has been part of Mureș County.

== Demographics ==
The commune has an absolute Székely Hungarian majority. At the 2002 census, it had a population of 1,420, of which 91.06% were Hungarian. At the 2011 census, the population decreased to 1,261; of those, 88.9% were Hungarians, 9.04% Roma, and 1.03% Romanians. At the 2021 census, Hodoșa had 1,179 inhabitants; of those, 80.49% were Hungarians, 10.06% Roma, and 3.22% Romanians.

== See also ==
- List of Hungarian exonyms (Mureș County)
