= Bereni =

Bereni Székelybere
- Commune
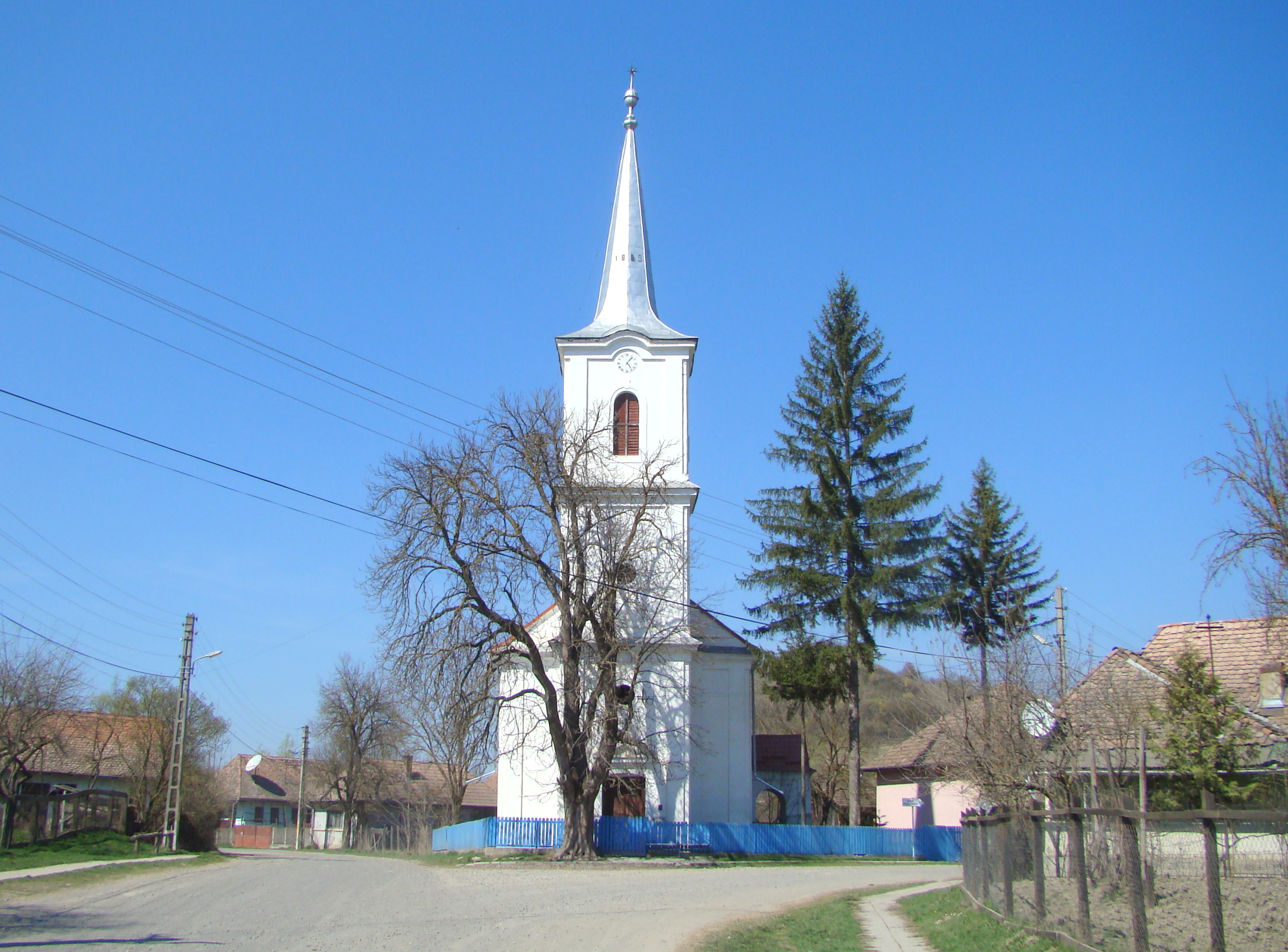
- Reformed church in Bereni

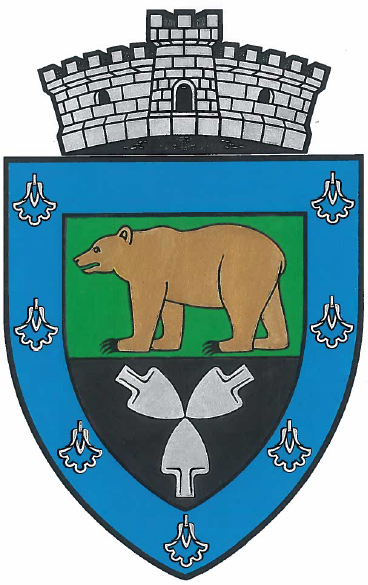
- Coat of arms

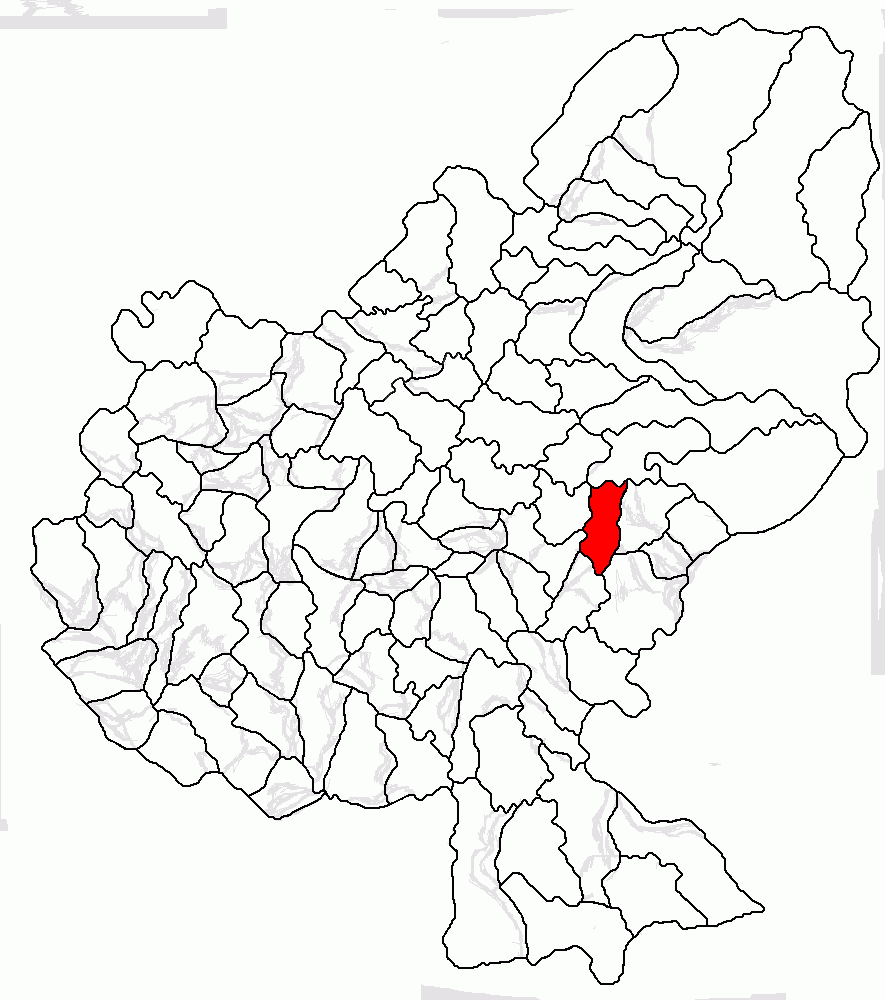
- Location in Mureș County

- Location in Romania
- Coordinates: 46°33′N 24°52′E
- Country: Romania
- County: Mureș

Government
  - Mayor (2020–2024): Csaba Benedekfi (UDMR)
- Area: 42 km^{2} (16 sq mi)
- Elevation: 370 m (1,210 ft)
- Population (2021-12-01): 1,188
  - Density: 28/km^{2} (73/sq mi)
- Time zone: UTC+02:00 (EET)
  - Summer (DST): UTC+03:00 (EEST)
- Postal code: 547387
- Area code: (+40) 0265
- Vehicle reg.: MS
- Website: bereni.ro

Bereni (Hungarian: Székelybere; Hungarian pronunciation: [seːkɛjbɛrɛ]) is a commune in Mureș County, Transylvania, Romania. It became an independent commune along with 6 other villages when it split from Măgherani (Nyárádmagyarós) in 2004. The commune is composed of seven villages: Bâra (Berekeresztúr), Bereni, Cându (Kendő), Drojdii (Seprőd), Eremieni (Nyárádszentimre), Maia (Mája), and Mărculeni (Márkod).

The commune is located in the east-central part of the county, 6 km (3.7 mi) east of the town of Miercurea Nirajului and 28 km (17 mi) from the county seat, Târgu Mureș.

== Demographics ==
Bereni has an absolute Hungarian majority. At the 2021 census, it had a population of 1,188, of which 92% were Hungarians and 0.7% were Romanians.

== See also ==
- List of Hungarian exonyms (Mureș County)
