= Nirajul Mic (Miercurea Nirajului) =

- Location within Romania

Location
- Country: Romania
- Counties: Mureș County
- Villages: Bereni, Miercurea Nirajului

Physical characteristics
- Source: Gurghiu Mountains
- Mouth: Niraj
  - location: Miercurea Nirajului
  - coordinates: 46.5306°N 24.8023°E
- Length: 17 km (11 mi)
- Basin size: 85 km^{2} (33 sq mi)

Basin features
- Progression: Niraj→ Mureș→ Tisza→ Danube→ Black Sea

The Nirajul Mic is a left tributary of the river Niraj in Romania. It discharges into the Niraj in Miercurea Nirajului. Its length is 17 km (11 mi) and its basin size is 85 km^{2} (33 sq mi).

It should not be confused with the Nirajul Mic, having the same name, a headwater of the Niraj, which it joins in the village of Câmpu Cetății.
