= Sărățeni, Mureș =

Sărățeni Sóvárad
- Commune
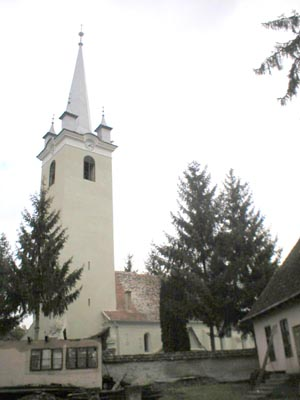
- Reformed church in Sărățeni

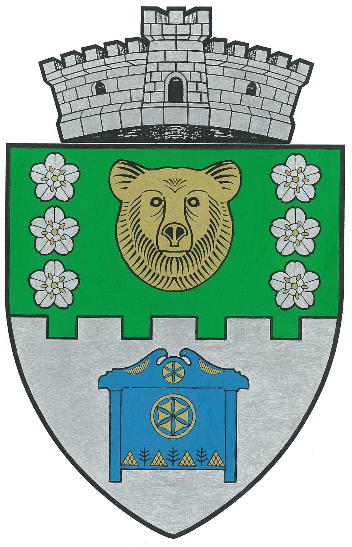
- Coat of arms

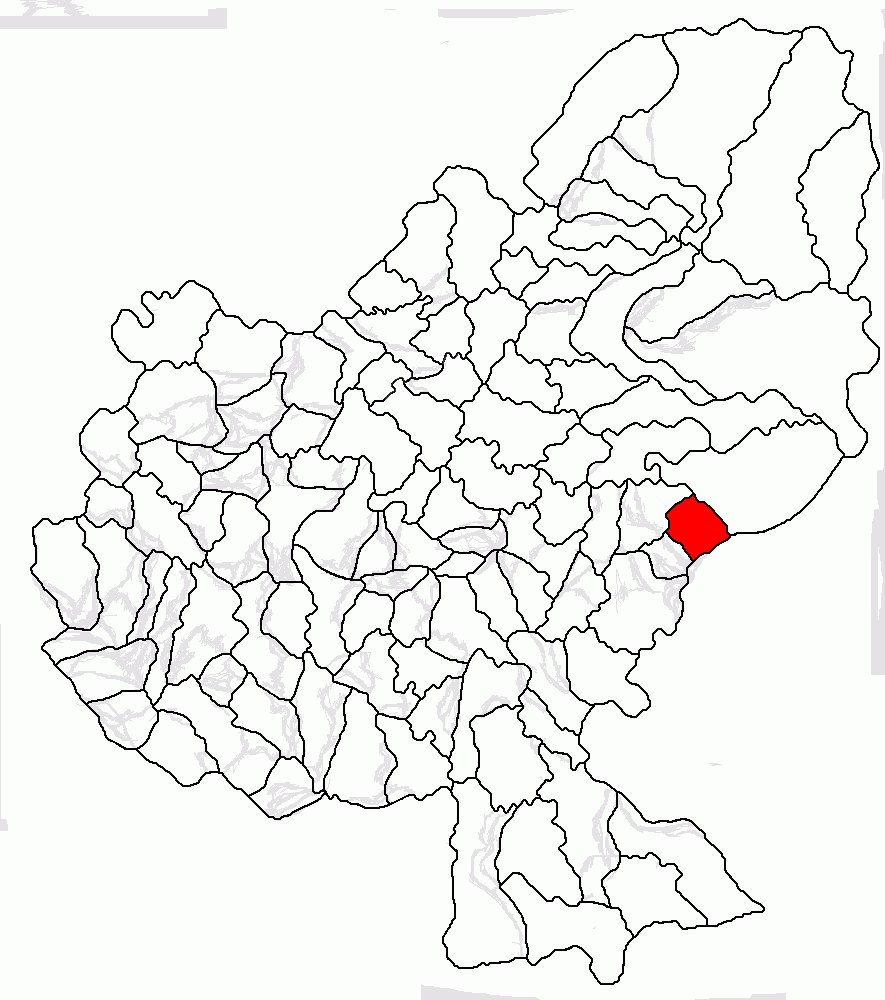
- Location in Mureș County

- Location in Romania
- Coordinates: 46°33′44″N 25°0′32″E
- Country: Romania
- County: Mureș

Government
  - Mayor (2020–2024): Csaba Biró (UDMR)
- Area: 33.4 km^{2} (12.9 sq mi)
- Elevation: 421 m (1,381 ft)
- Population (2021-12-01): 1,625
  - Density: 48.7/km^{2} (126/sq mi)
- Time zone: UTC+02:00 (EET)
  - Summer (DST): UTC+03:00 (EEST)
- Postal code: 545504
- Area code: +(40) 265
- Vehicle reg.: MS
- Website: sarateni.ro

Sărățeni (Hungarian: Sóvárad, Hungarian pronunciation: [ˈʃoːvaːrɒd]) is a commune in Mureș County, Transylvania, Romania. It became an independent commune when it split from the town of Sovata in 2004. It is composed of a single village, Sărățeni.

The commune is situated on the Transylvanian Plateau, at an altitude of 421 m (1,381 ft), on the banks of the Târnava Mică River. It is located in the eastern part of Mureș County, 6 km (3.7 mi) southwest of the town of Sovata and 45 km (28 mi) east of the county seat, Târgu Mureș, on the border with Harghita County. Sărățeni is crossed by national road DN13A, which connects Bălăușeri to Miercurea Ciuc.

Historical population
Year	Pop.	±%
1850	1,390	—
1880	1,569	+12.9%
1900	1,878	+19.7%
1910	1,946	+3.6%
1930	1,760	−9.6%
1956	1,755	−0.3%
1977	1,644	−6.3%
1992	1,610	−2.1%
2002	1,627	+1.1%
2011	1,608	−1.2%
2021	1,625	+1.1%
Source: Census data

At the 2011 census, the commune had 1,608 inhabitants, of which 82.46% were Hungarians, 14.74% Roma, and 1.49% Romanians. At the 2021 census, Sărățeni had a population of 1,625; of those, 89.05% were Hungarians, 6.03% Roma, and 1.29% Romanians.

The commune is the location of Castra of Sărățeni, a Roman fort. In March–April 1919, the Ținutul Sării revolt occurred in the salt mining area around Sărățeni.

== See also ==
- List of Hungarian exonyms (Mureș County)
