= Transilvania Motor Ring =

Romanian racing circuit

- Location: Cerghid, Mureș (near Târgu Mureș)
- Coordinates: 46°26′7″N 24°25′37″E
- Broke ground: September 2011; 14 years ago
- Opened: November 2018; 7 years ago
- Website: https://transilvaniamotorring.com/

Full Circuit (2018–present)
- Length: 3.7 km (2.3 mi)
- Turns: 17

Transilvania Motor Ring is a 3.708 km (2.304 mi) racing circuit located 20 km (12 mi) south–west of Târgu Mureș, in the historical region of Transylvania. It is the largest racing venue in Romania.
