= Măgherani =

Măgherani Nyárádmagyarós
- Commune
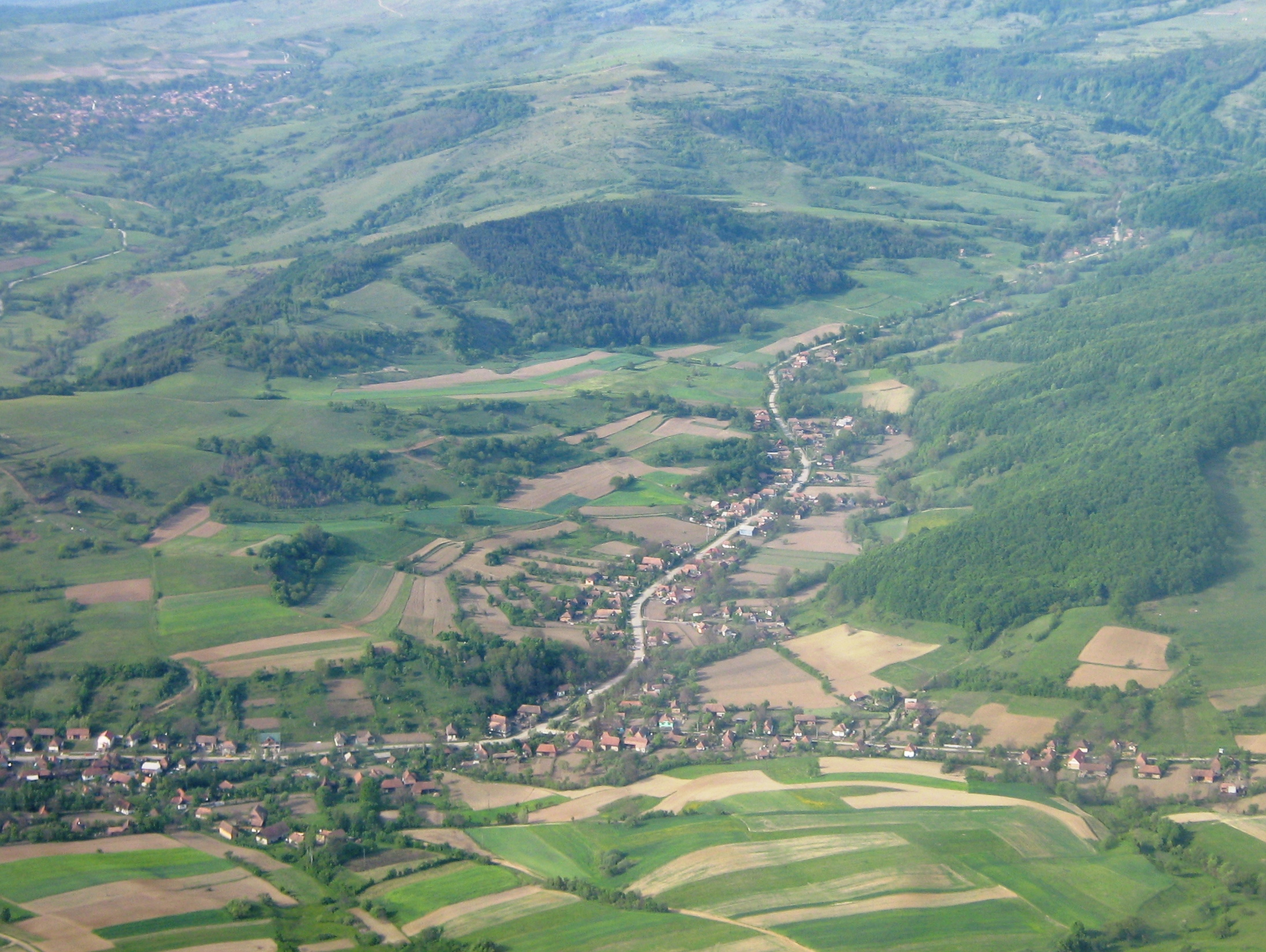

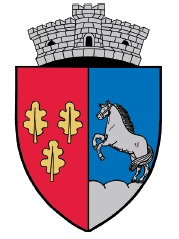
- Coat of arms

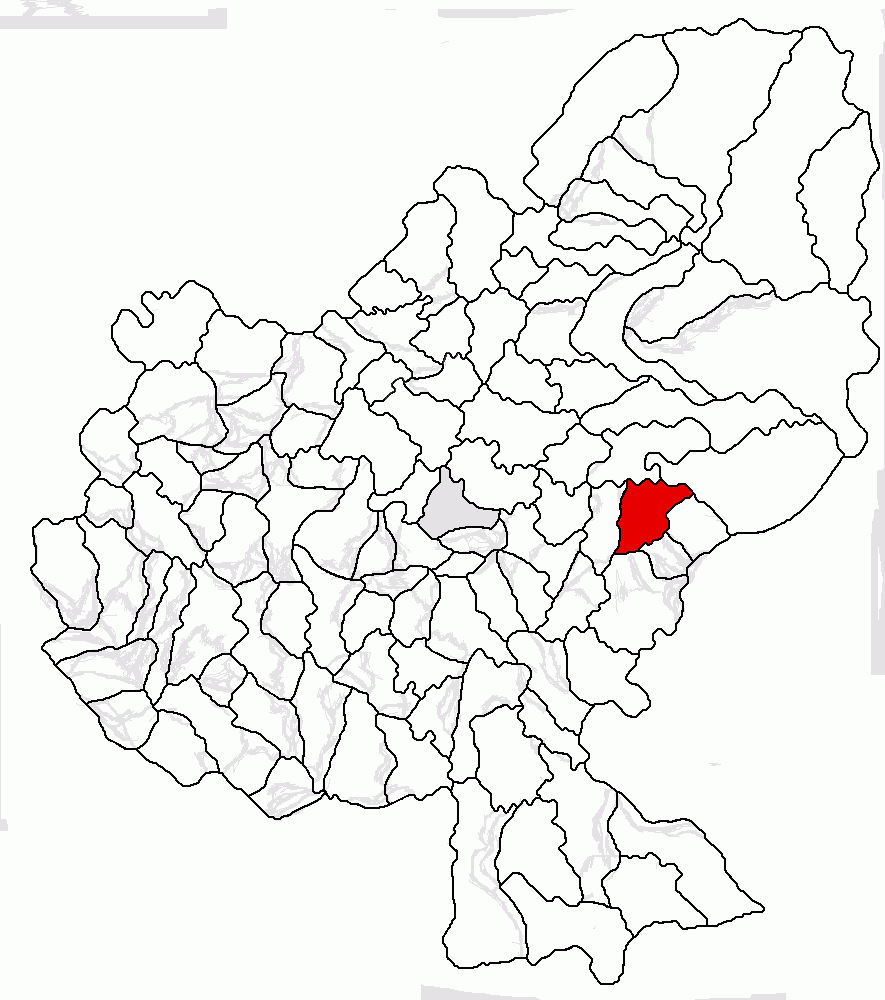
- Location in Mureș County

- Location in Romania
- Coordinates: 46°34′N 24°54′E
- Country: Romania
- County: Mureș

Government
  - Mayor (2020–2024): Laios Kacsó (UDMR)
- Area: 58.02 km^{2} (22.40 sq mi)
- Elevation: 384 m (1,260 ft)
- Population (2021-12-01): 1,332
  - Density: 22.96/km^{2} (59.46/sq mi)
- Time zone: UTC+02:00 (EET)
  - Summer (DST): UTC+03:00 (EEST)
- Postal code: 547385
- Area code: (+40) 0265
- Vehicle reg.: MS
- Website: www.comunamagherani.ro

Măgherani (Hungarian: Nyárádmagyarós or colloquially Magyarós, Hungarian pronunciation: [ˈɲaːraːdmɒɟɒroːʃ]) is a commune in Mureș County, Transylvania, Romania composed of three villages: Măgherani, Șilea Nirajului (Nyárádselye), and Torba (Torboszló). In 2004, Bereni, along with six other villages, broke away from Măgherani to form an independent commune.

== History ==
The locality formed part of the Székely Land region of the historical Transylvania province. Until 1918, it belonged to the Maros-Torda County of the Kingdom of Hungary. After the Hungarian–Romanian War of 1918–19 and the Treaty of Trianon of 1920, the commune became part of the Kingdom of Romania. As a result of the Second Vienna Award, it belonged to Hungary again between 1940 and 1944. After World War II, it returned to Romanian administration. Between 1952 and 1960, Măgherani constituted part of the Magyar Autonomous Region, then, of the Mureș-Magyar Autonomous Region until it was abolished in 1968. Since then, the commune is part of Mureș County.

== Demographics ==
The commune has an absolute Hungarian majority. According to the 2011 census it had a population of 1,270, of which 92.91% were Hungarians and 5.81% Roma. At the 2021 census, Măgherani had a population of 1,332; of those, 90.47% were Hungarians and 1.86% Roma.

== See also ==
- List of Hungarian exonyms (Mureș County)
