= Castra of Sărățeni =

Roman fort in Dacia

- Location within Romania
- 46.56270°N 25.01481°E
- Location: Castru, Sărățeni, Mureș, Romania

History
- Abandoned: 4th or 5th century AD

Site notes
- Condition: Ruined

It was a fort in the Roman province of Dacia, at modern Sărățeni, Mureș County, Romania.

== See also ==
- List of castra

== Notes ==
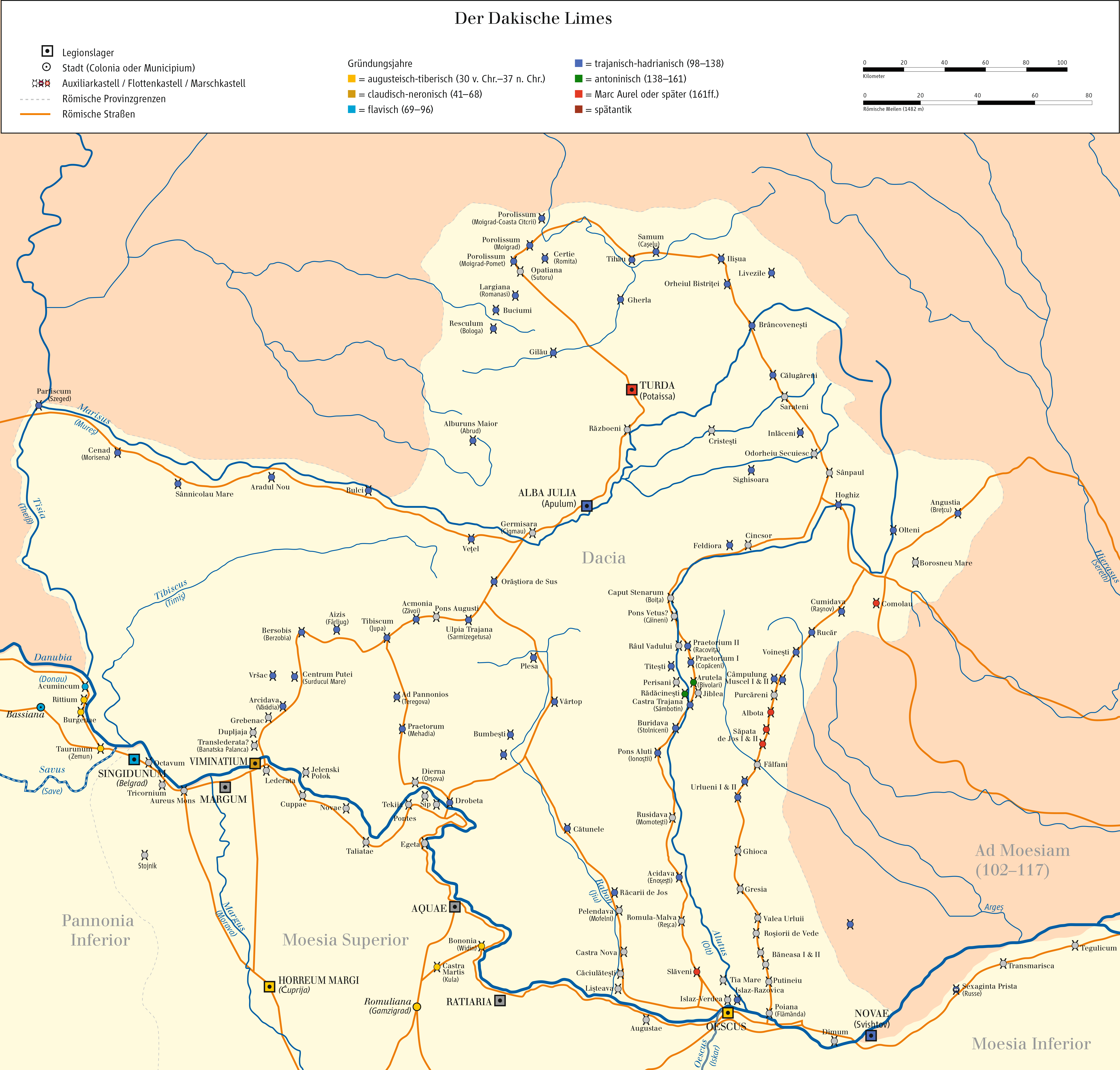
Map of the Limes in Dacia. The Castra of Sărățeni is located in the upper right corner.
