= Nirajul Mare =

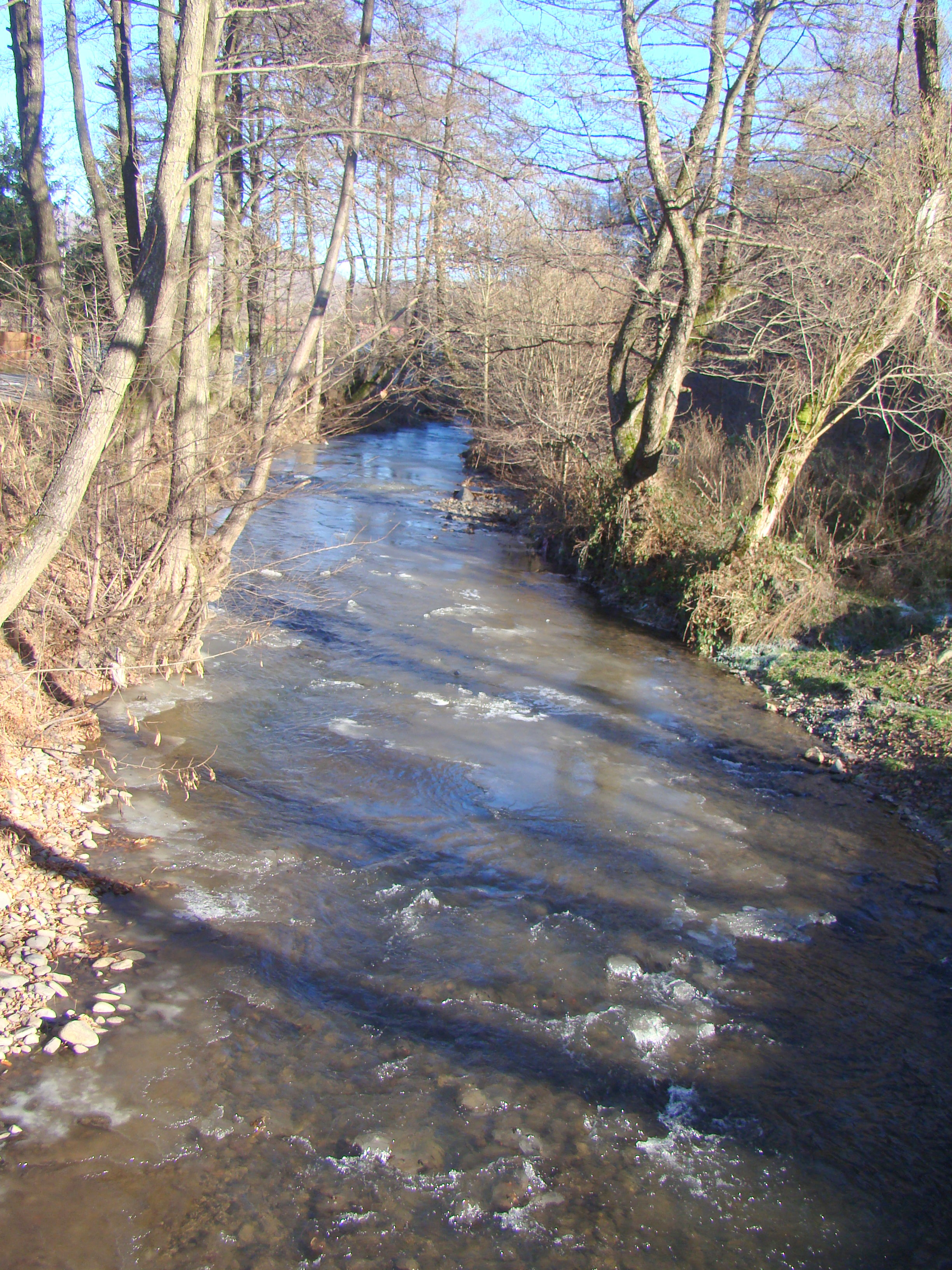

- Location within Romania

Location
- Country: Romania
- Counties: Mureș County

Physical characteristics
- Source: Gurghiu Mountains
- Mouth: Niraj
  - location: Câmpu Cetății
  - coordinates: 46.6742°N 25.0194°E
- Length: 14 km (8.7 mi)
- Basin size: 39 km^{2} (15 sq mi)

Basin features
- Progression: Niraj→ Mureș→ Tisza→ Danube→ Black Sea

The Nirajul Mare is the right headwater of the river Niraj in Romania. It joins the Nirajul Mic in the village of Câmpu Cetății to form the Niraj. Its length is 14 km (8.7 mi) and its basin size is 39 km^{2} (15 sq mi).
