= Ujhelyi =

Ujhelyi is a surname. Notable people with the surname include:

- Beáta Újhelyi (born 1980), Hungarian swimmer
- István Ujhelyi (born 1975), Hungarian politician
- Petra Ujhelyi (born 1980), Hungarian basketball player
