= Vărgata =

Vărgata Csíkfalva
- Commune
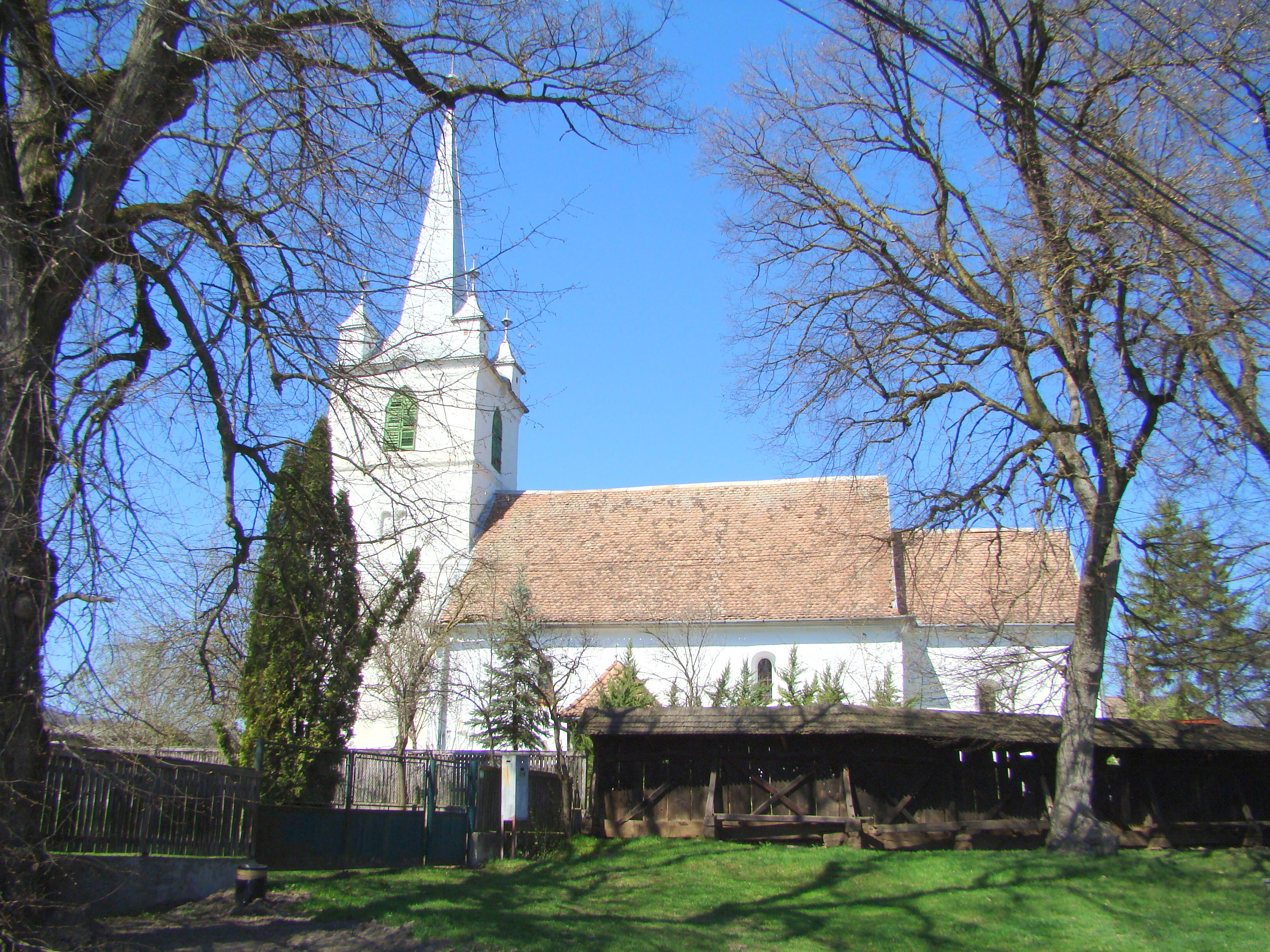
- Unitarian church in Mitrești

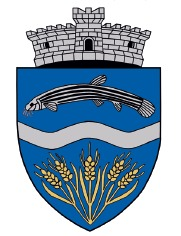
- Coat of arms

- Location in Mureș County

- Location in Romania
- Coordinates: 46°34′N 24°48′E
- Country: Romania
- County: Mureș

Government
  - Mayor (2024–2028): Ervin Varga (UDMR)
- Area: 40.33 km^{2} (15.57 sq mi)
- Elevation: 370 m (1,210 ft)
- Population (2021-12-01): 1,681
  - Density: 41.68/km^{2} (108.0/sq mi)
- Time zone: UTC+02:00 (EET)
  - Summer (DST): UTC+03:00 (EEST)
- Postal code: 547625
- Area code: (+40) 0265
- Vehicle reg.: MS
- Website: ms.ovelo.ro/vargata/

Vărgata (Hungarian: Csíkfalva, Hungarian pronunciation: [ˈtʃikfɒlvɒ]) is a commune in Mureș County, Transylvania, Romania composed of five villages: Grâușorul (Búzaháza), Mitrești {Nyárádszentmárton), Vadu (Vadad), Valea (Jobbágyfalva), and Vărgata.

== History ==
The locality formed part of the Székely Land region of the historical Transylvania province. It was first mentioned in 1412 as Chykfalua (Csíkfalva). Until 1918, the villages belonged to the Maros-Torda County of the Kingdom of Hungary. After the Hungarian–Romanian War of 1918–19 and the Treaty of Trianon of 1920, the commune became part of the Kingdom of Romania.

== Demographics ==
The commune has an absolute Hungarian majority. According to the 2011 census, it had a population of 1,945; out of them, 81.1% were Hungarian, 14.3% were Roma, and 0.6% were Romanians. At the 2021 census, Vărgata had a population of 1,681; of those, 76.26% were Hungarians and 11.96% Roma.

== See also ==
- List of Hungarian exonyms (Mureș County)
