= Gălești, Mureș =

Gălești Nyárádgálfalva
- Commune
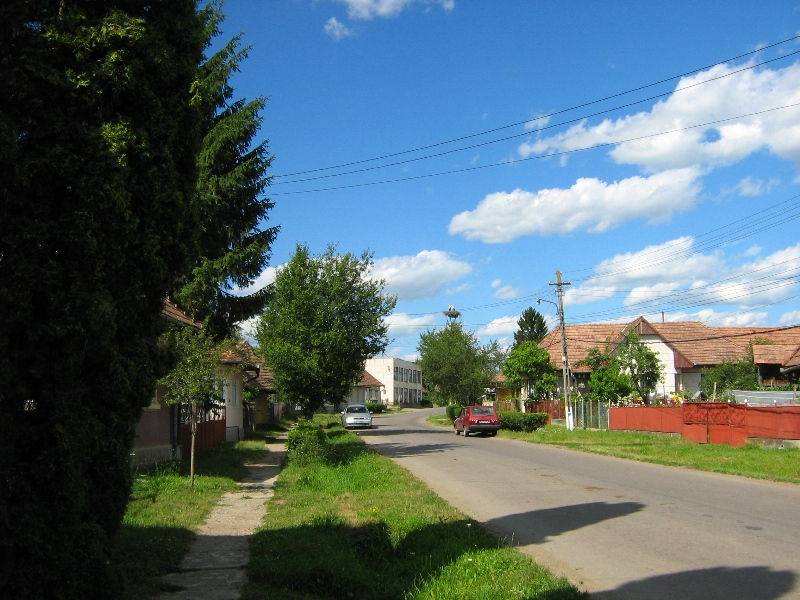

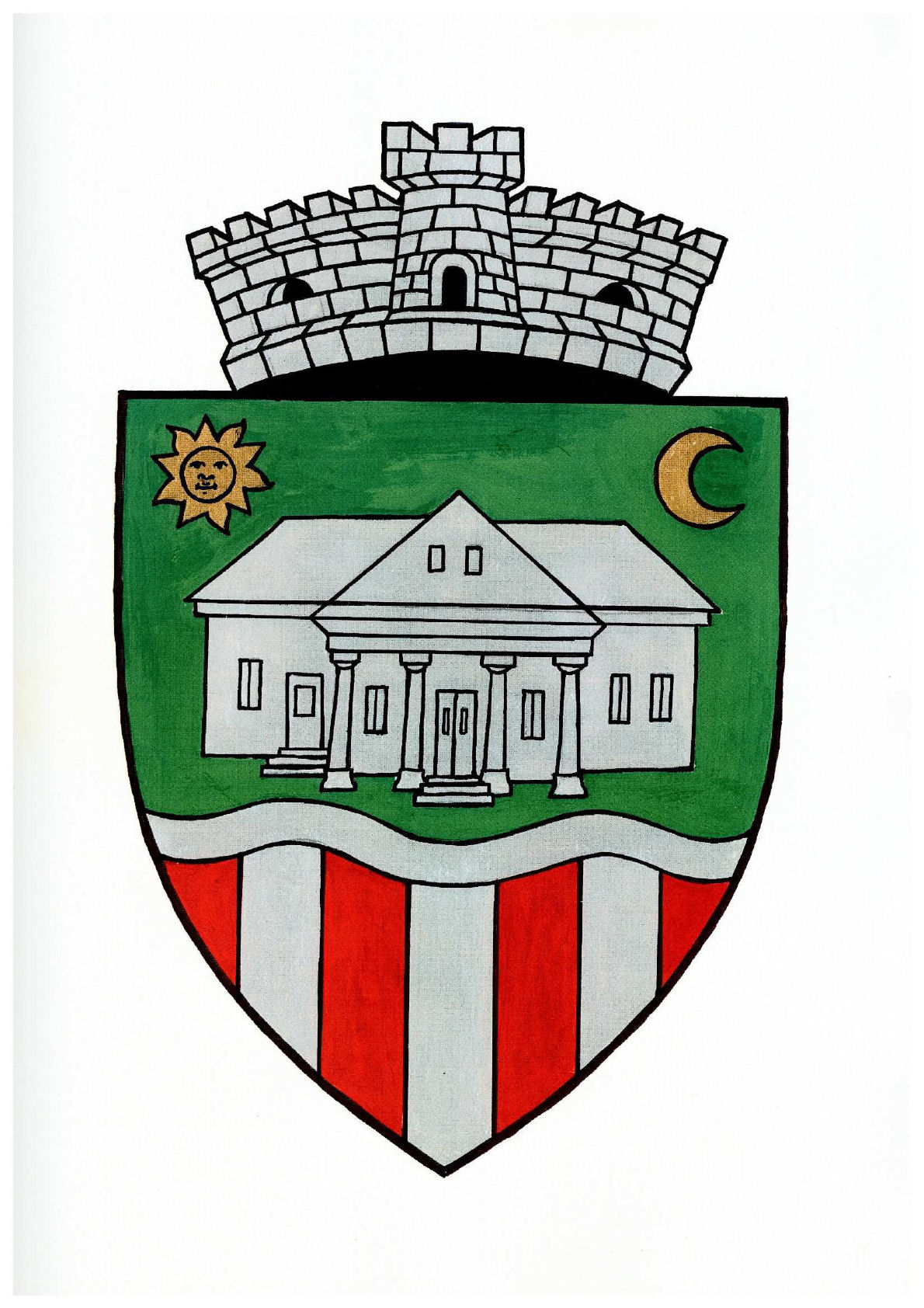
- Coat of arms

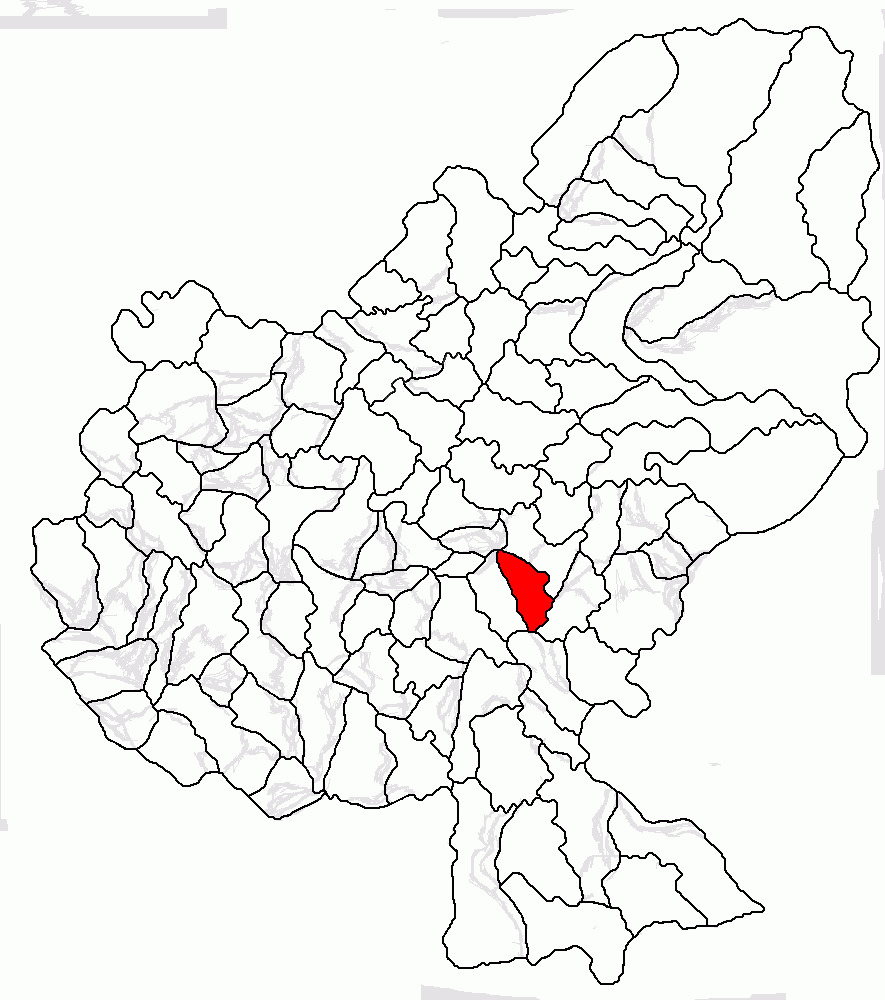
- Location in Mureș County

- Location in Romania
- Coordinates: 46°31′N 24°45′E
- Country: Romania
- County: Mureș

Government
  - Mayor (2020–2024): Károly Karácsonyi (UDMR)
- Area: 57.79 km^{2} (22.31 sq mi)
- Elevation: 357 m (1,171 ft)
- Population (2021-12-01): 2,271
  - Density: 39.30/km^{2} (101.8/sq mi)
- Time zone: UTC+02:00 (EET)
  - Summer (DST): UTC+03:00 (EEST)
- Postal code: 547245
- Area code: (+40) 0265
- Vehicle reg.: MS
- Website: galesti.ro

Gălești (Hungarian: Nyárádgálfalva, Hungarian pronunciation: [ˈniaːraːdɡaːlfɒlvɒ]) is a commune in Mureș County, Transylvania, Romania composed of seven villages: Adrianu Mare (Nagyadorján), Adrianu Mic (Kisadorján), Bedeni (Bede), Gălești, Maiad (Nyomát), Sânvăsii (Nyárádszentlászló, established 2004), and Troița (Szentháromság).

The commune is situated on the Transylvanian Plateau, at an altitude of 357 m (1,171 ft), on the banks of the river Niraj. It is located in the central part of Mureș County, 18 km (11 mi) southeast of the county seat, Târgu Mureș, on county road DJ151D.

== Demographics ==
Historical population
Year	Pop.	±%
1850	3,317	—
1880	3,411	+2.8%
1900	3,947	+15.7%
1910	4,049	+2.6%
1930	4,130	+2.0%
1956	4,566	+10.6%
1977	3,561	−22.0%
1992	2,963	−16.8%
2002	2,940	−0.8%
2011	3,067	+4.3%
2021	2,271	−26.0%
Source: Census data

The commune has an absolute Székely Hungarian majority. According to the 2002 census, it had a population of 2,940, of which 93.61% were Hungarians and 1.5% Romanians. At the 2011 census, there were 3,067 inhabitants, of which 85.13% were Hungarians, 2.22% Romanians, and 1.47% Roma. At the 2021 census, Gălești had a population of 2,271; of those, 85.34% were Hungarians, 5.11% Roma, and 2.99% Romanians.

== See also ==
- List of Hungarian exonyms (Mureș County)
