= Acățari =

Acățari Ákosfalva
- Commune
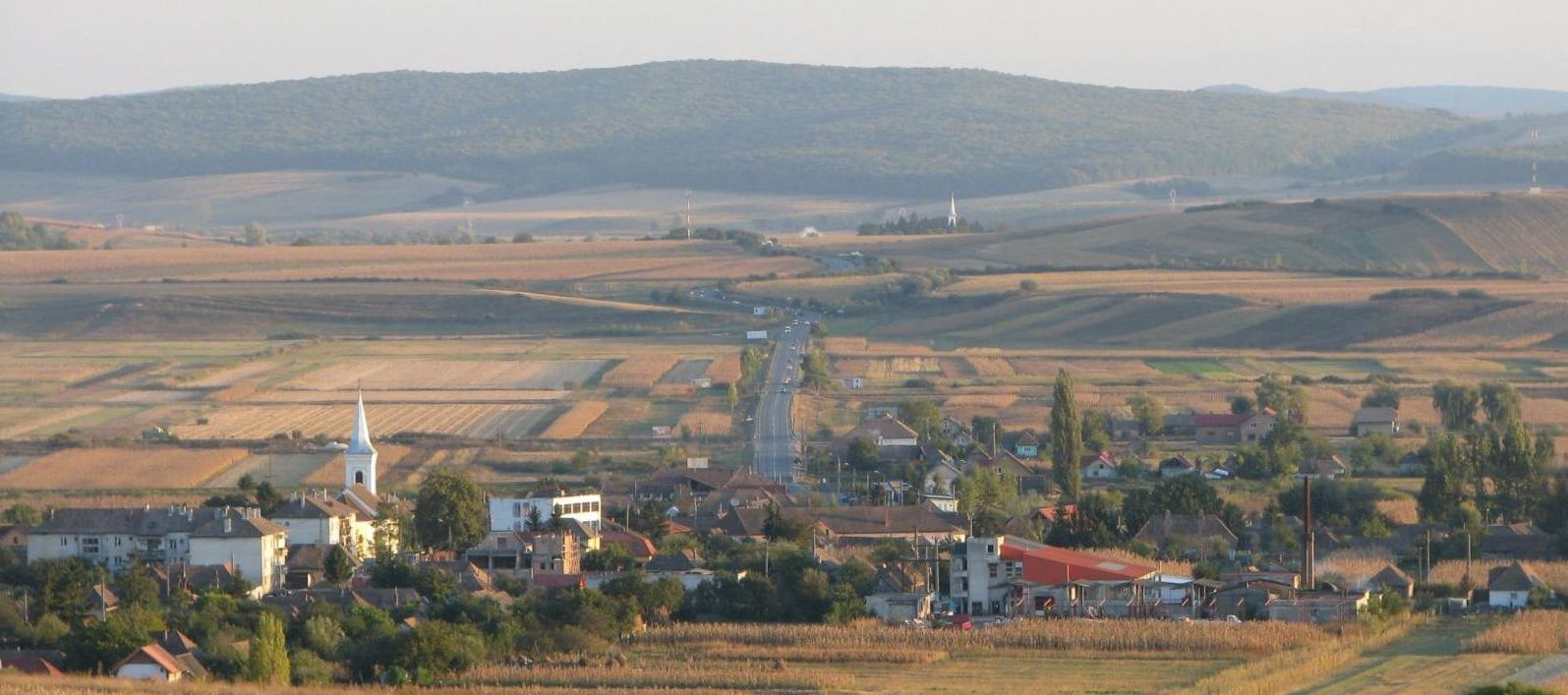
- View of Acățari

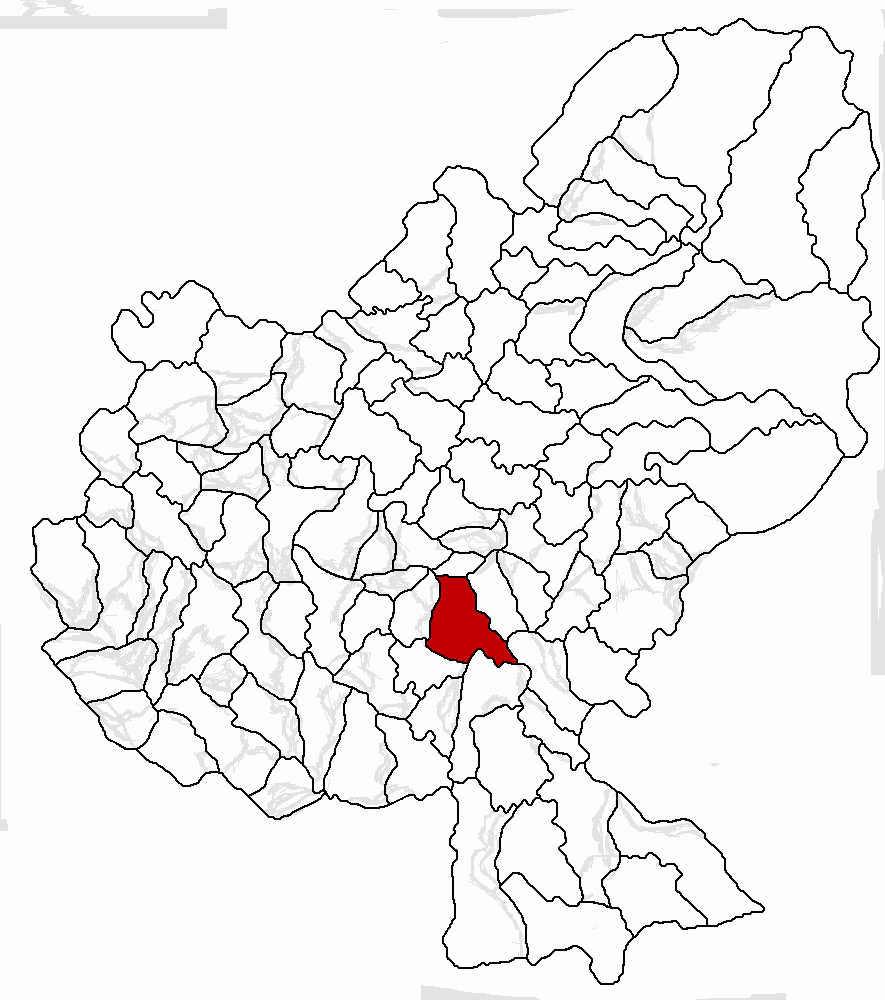
- Location in Mureș County

- Location in Romania
- Coordinates: 46°29′N 24°38′E
- Country: Romania
- County: Mureș

Government
  - Mayor (2020–2024): Csaba Osváth (UDMR)
- Area: 74.2 km^{2} (28.6 sq mi)
- Elevation: 320 m (1,050 ft)
- Population (2021-12-01): 5,170
  - Density: 69.7/km^{2} (180/sq mi)
- Time zone: UTC+02:00 (EET)
  - Summer (DST): UTC+03:00 (EEST)
- Postal code: 547005
- Area code: +(40) 265
- Vehicle reg.: MS
- Website: www.acatari.ro

Acățari (Hungarian: Ákosfalva, [ˈaːkoʃfɒlvɒ]) is a commune in Mureș County, Transylvania, Romania composed of nine villages: Acățari, Corbești (Székelycsóka), Găiești (Göcs), Gruișor (Kisgörgény), Murgești (Nyárádszentbenedek), Roteni (Harasztkerék), Stejeriș (Cserefalva), Suveica (Szövérd), and Vălenii (Székelyvaja).

== Demographics ==
Historical population
Year	Pop.	±%
1850	5,026	—
1880	4,650	−7.5%
1900	5,503	+18.3%
1910	5,833	+6.0%
1930	5,784	−0.8%
1941	6,295	+8.8%
1956	6,256	−0.6%
1977	5,230	−16.4%
1992	4,705	−10.0%
2002	4,781	+1.6%
2011	4,738	−0.9%
2021	5,170	+9.1%
Source: Census data

The commune has an absolute Székely Hungarian majority. According to the 2011 census, it had a population of 4,781, of which 85.84% were Hungarians, 10.19% Roma, and 1.92% Romanians. At the 2021 census, Acățari had a population of 5,170, of which 84.78% were Hungarians, 10.35% Roma, and 2.65% Romanians.

== See also ==
- List of Hungarian exonyms (Mureș County)
