= Ungheni, Mureș =

Ungheni
- Town
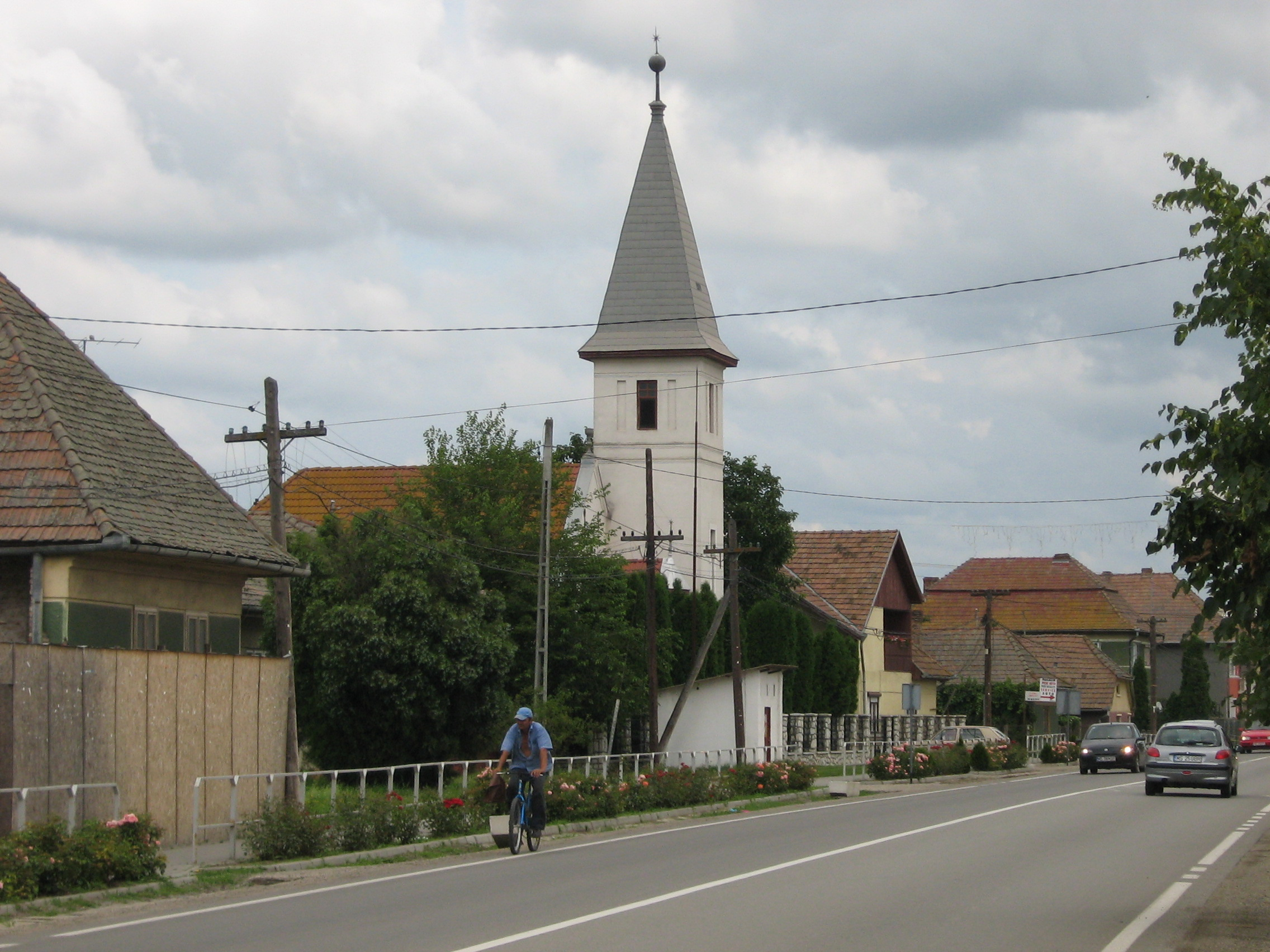
- Reformed church

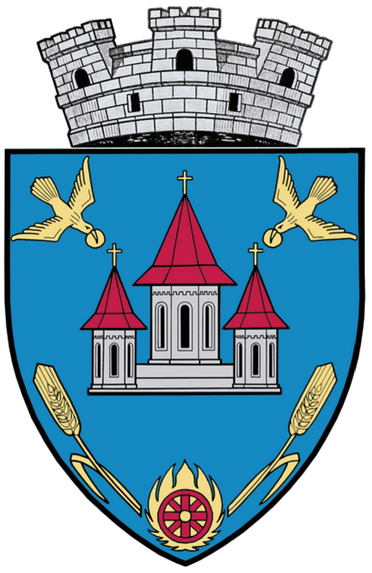
- Coat of arms

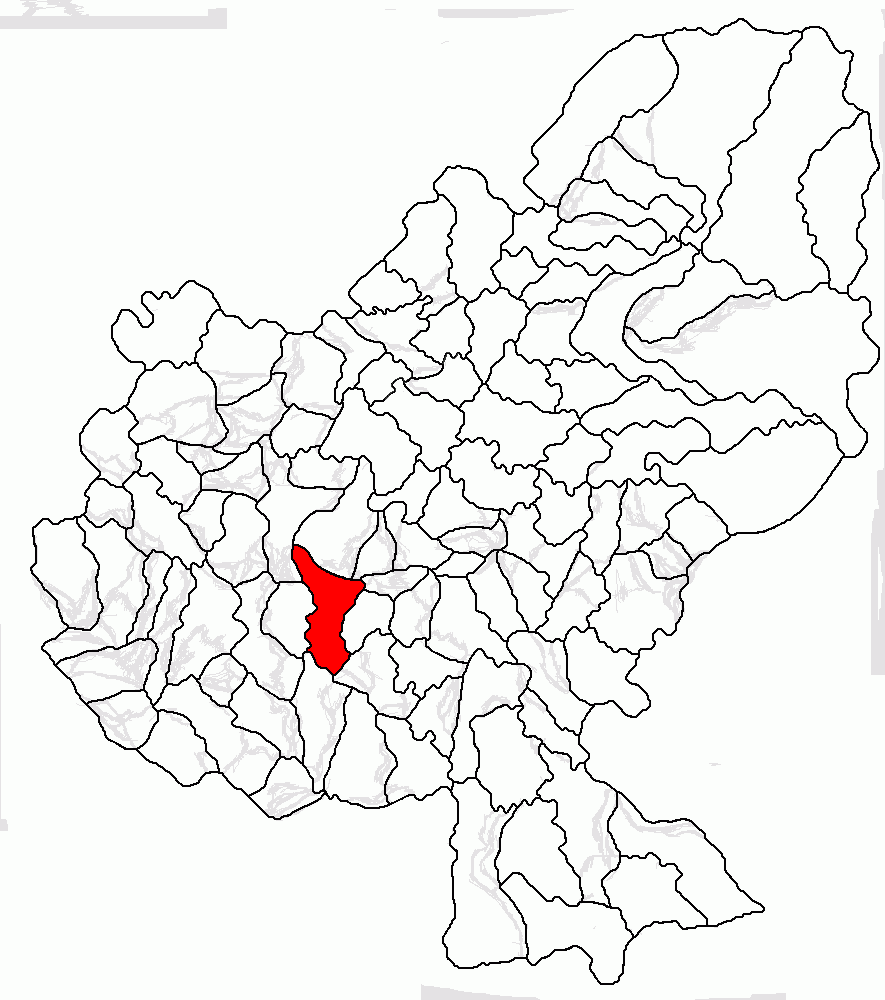
- Location in Mureș County

- Location in Romania
- Coordinates: 46°29′9″N 24°27′39″E
- Country: Romania
- County: Mureș

Government
  - Mayor (2024–2028): Victor Prodan (PNL)
- Area: 63.69 km^{2} (24.59 sq mi)
- Elevation: 296 m (971 ft)
- Population (2021-12-01): 7,007
  - Density: 110.0/km^{2} (284.9/sq mi)
- Time zone: UTC+02:00 (EET)
  - Summer (DST): UTC+03:00 (EEST)
- Postal code: 547605
- Area code: (+40) 02 65
- Vehicle reg.: MS
- Website: www.primariaungheni.ro

Ungheni (Hungarian: Nyárádtő [ˈɲaːraːttøː]; German: Nyaradfluß) is a town in Mureș County, in Transylvania, Romania. Until 1925 its Romanian name was Nirașteu. Six villages are administered by the town: Cerghid (Nagycserged), Cerghizel (Kiscserged), Morești (Malomfalva), Recea (Recsa), Șăușa (Sóspatak), and Vidrasău (Vidrátszeg).

== Location ==
Ungheni is situated 10.6 kilometres (6.6 mi) from the county capital Târgu Mureș, 42.2 km (26.2 mi) from Reghin, and 99.6 km (61.9 mi) from Cluj-Napoca. The Târgu Mureș International Airport is located in Vidrasău, 14 km (8.7 mi) southwest of the county capital.

The town is bordered by the following communes: to the north by Band and Pănet, to the south by Suplac and Mica, to the east by Cristești, and to the west by Sânpaul. It is crossed by the A3 motorway, which runs from Bucharest to the Hungarian border near Oradea. The General Nicolae Dăscălescu train station serves the CFR Line 405, which connects Deda to Războieni-Cetate, passing through Târgu Mureș and Luduș.

== Demographics ==
Historical population
Year	Pop.	±%
1850	3,339	—
1880	3,503	+4.9%
1900	4,278	+22.1%
1910	4,353	+1.8%
1930	4,497	+3.3%
1956	4,967	+10.5%
1977	5,981	+20.4%
1992	6,609	+10.5%
2002	6,554	−0.8%
2011	6,945	+6.0%
2021	7,007	+0.9%
Source: Census data

At the 2011 census, the town has a population of 6,945; of those, 5,053 (76.3%) were Romanians, 984 (14.85%) Roma, 576 (8.69%) Hungarians, and 4 (0.06%) others. At the 2021 census, Ungheni had a population of 7,007; of those, 70.29% were Romanians, 13.87% Roma, 5.39% Hungarians, and 10.39% of unknown ethnic origin.

== Natives ==
- Erasmus Julius Nyárády (1881–1966), botanist

== See also ==
- Transilvania Motor Ring
