= Eremitu =

Eremitu Nyárádremete
- Commune
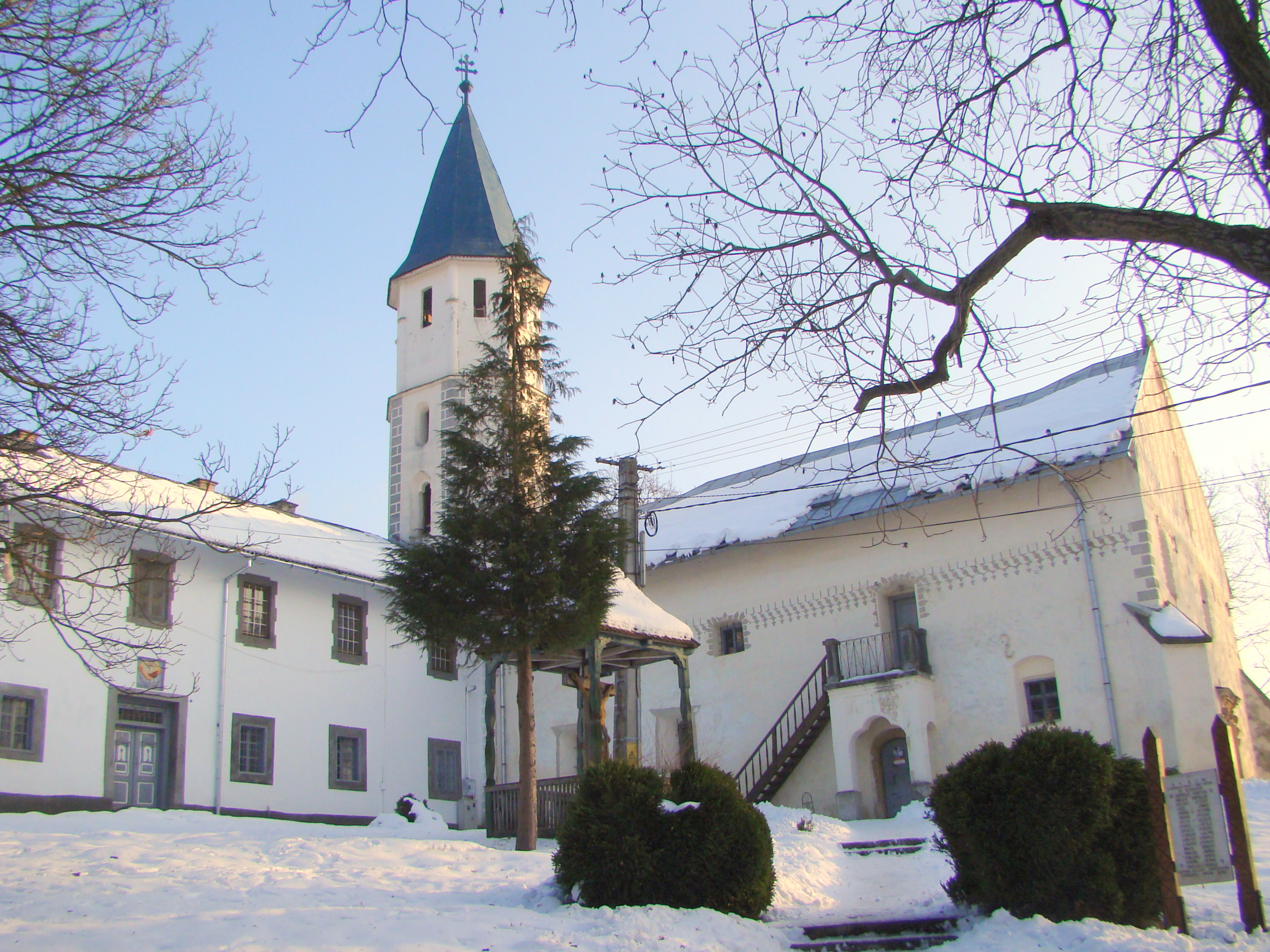
- Franciscan monastery in Călugăreni

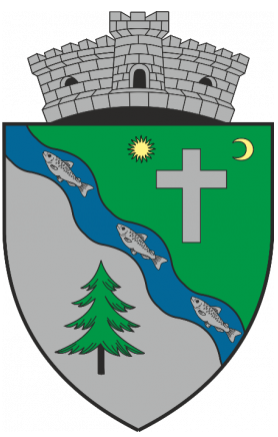
- Coat of arms

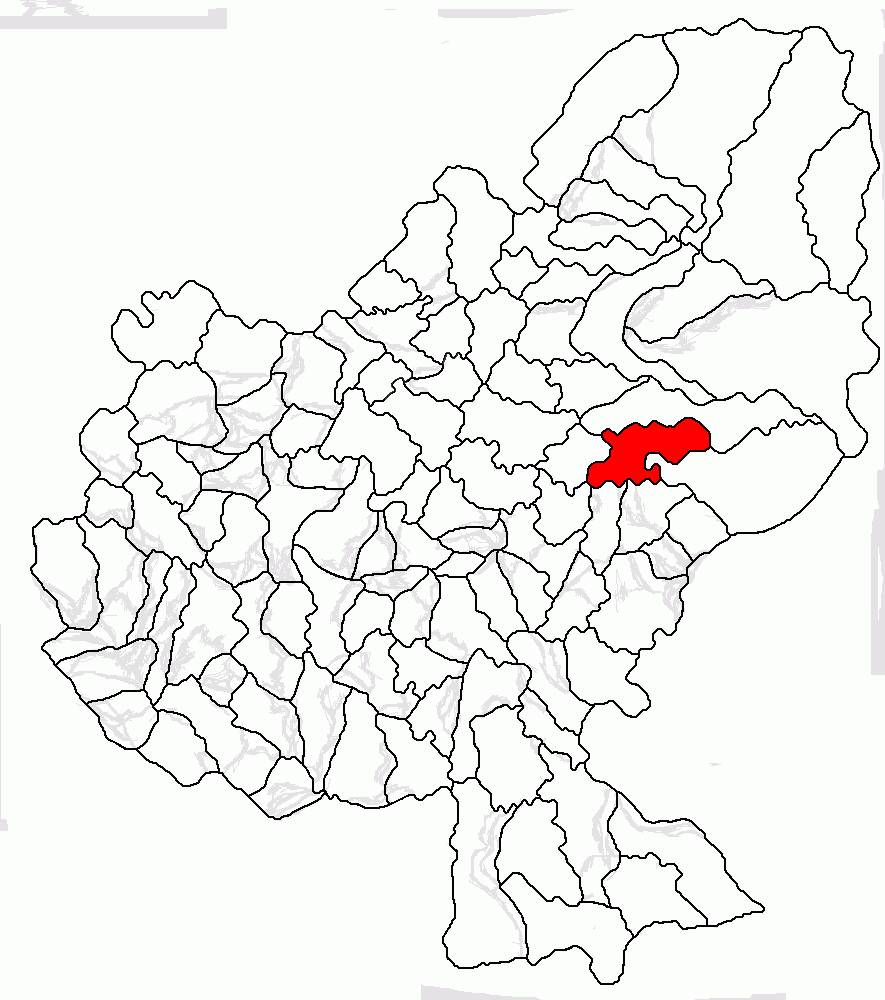
- Location in Mureș County

- Location in Romania
- Coordinates: 46°40′N 24°56′E
- Country: Romania
- County: Mureș

Government
  - Mayor (2024–2028): Péter Magyari (UDMR)
- Area: 83.11 km^{2} (32.09 sq mi)
- Elevation: 491 m (1,611 ft)
- Population (2021-12-01): 3,952
  - Density: 47.55/km^{2} (123.2/sq mi)
- Time zone: UTC+02:00 (EET)
  - Summer (DST): UTC+03:00 (EEST)
- Postal code: 547210
- Area code: (+40) 0265
- Vehicle reg.: MS
- Website: eremitu.ro

Eremitu (Hungarian: Nyárádremete, Hungarian pronunciation: [ɲaːraːdrɛmɛtɛ]) is a commune in Mureș County, Transylvania, Romania, composed of five villages: Călugăreni (Mikháza), Câmpu Cetății (Vármező), Dămieni (Deményháza), Eremitu (Nyárádremete), and Mătrici (Nyárádköszvényes).

Călugăreni is the site of the Roman Castra of Călugăreni fort in the Roman province of Dacia, located on the north-western periphery of the village.

The route of the Via Transilvanica long-distance trail passes through Eremitu, where the Highlands section of the trail ends, and the Terra Siculorum section begins.

== Demographics ==
Historical population
Year	Pop.	±%
1850	2,907	—
1880	3,315	+14.0%
1900	4,273	+28.9%
1910	4,319	+1.1%
1930	4,369	+1.2%
1956	5,177	+18.5%
1977	4,289	−17.2%
1992	3,912	−8.8%
2002	3,872	−1.0%
2011	3,893	+0.5%
2021	3,952	+1.5%
Source: Census data

At the 2011 census, the commune had a population of 3,893, of which 89% were Hungarians, 4.2% Romanians, and 4% Roma. At the 2021 census, Eremitu had a population of 3,952; of those, 80.4% were Hungarians, 10.5% Roma, and 4.9% Romanians.

== Natives ==
- Ferenc Nyulas (1758–1808), physician

== See also ==
- List of Hungarian exonyms (Mureș County)
