= Miercurea Nirajului =

Miercurea Nirajului Nyárádszereda
- Town
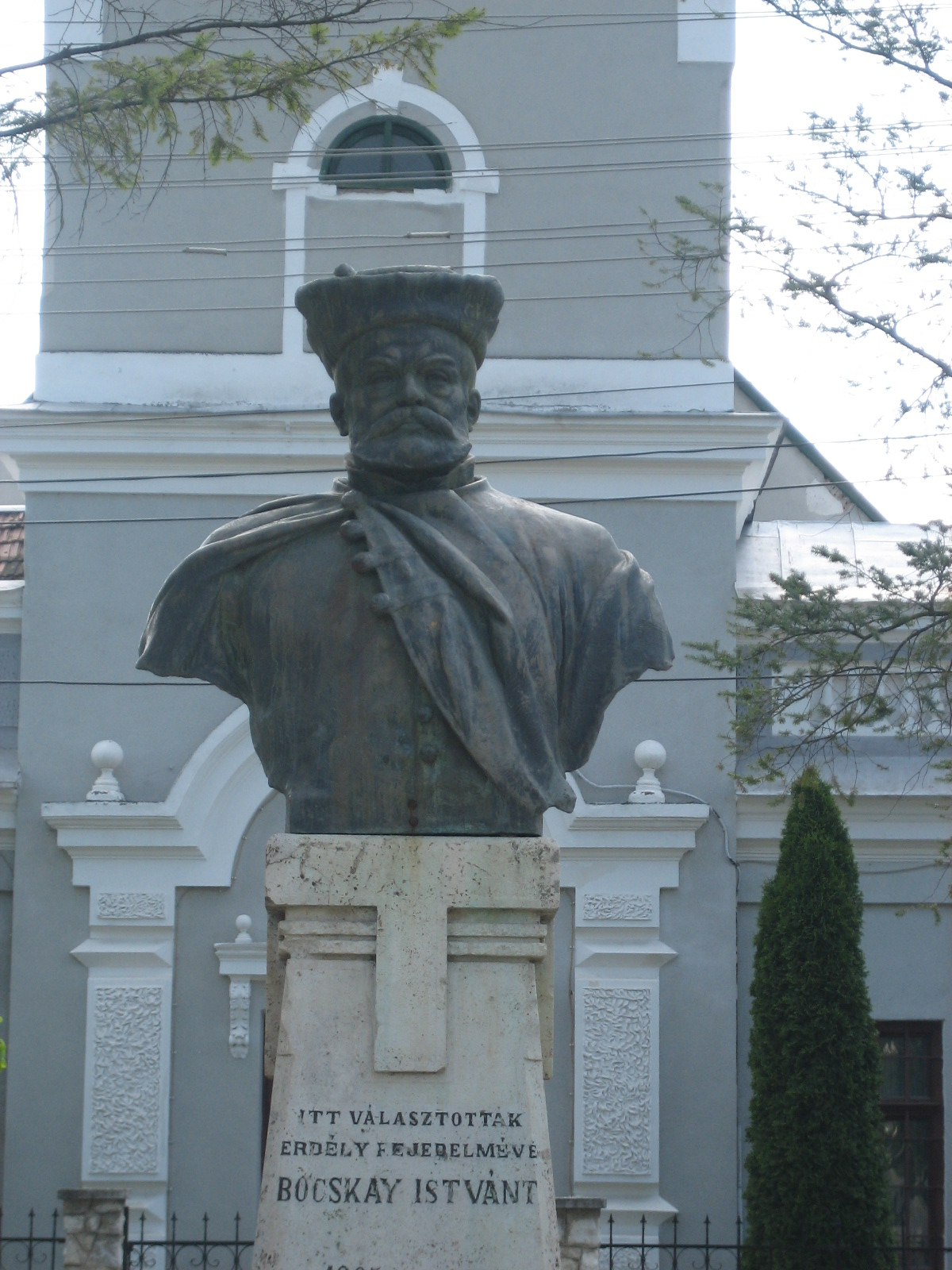
- The statue of István Bocskay

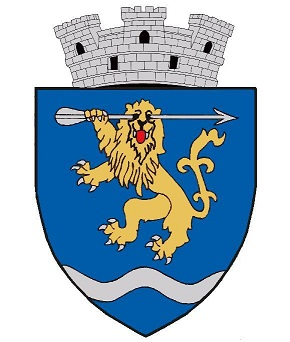
- Coat of arms

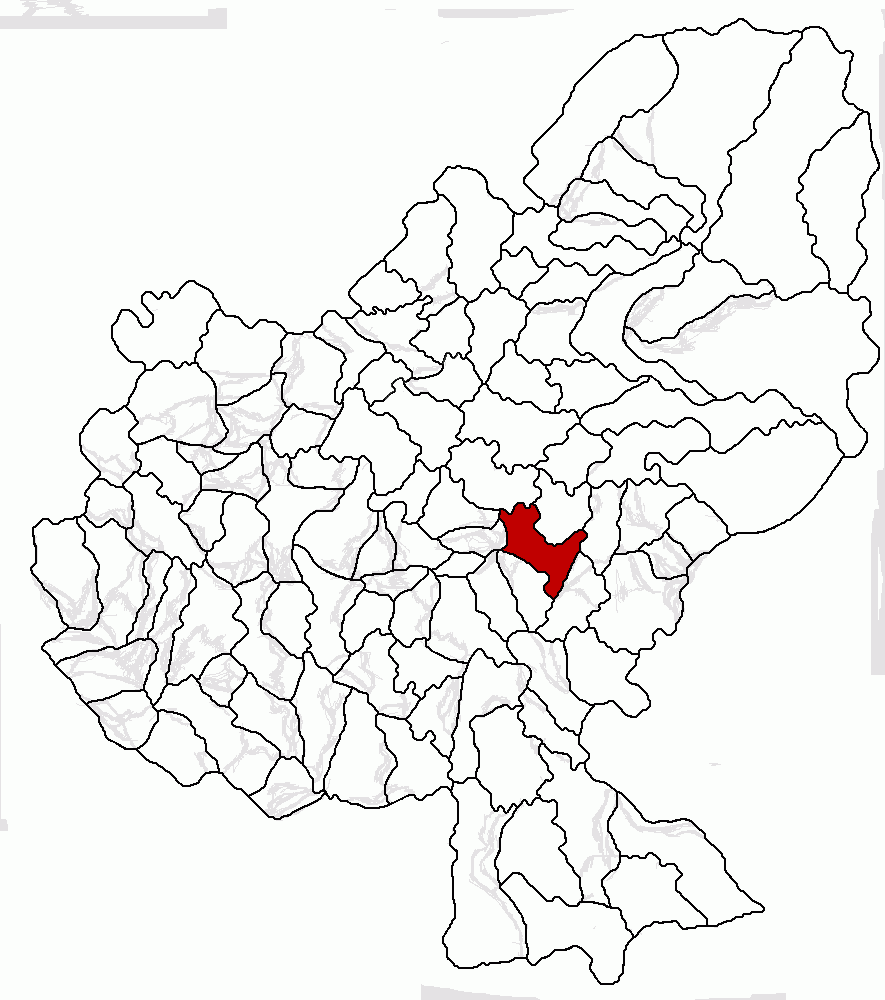
- Location in Mureș County

- Location in Romania
- Coordinates: 46°31′48″N 24°48′0″E
- Country: Romania
- County: Mureș

Government
  - Mayor (2024–2028): Sándor Toth (UDMR)
- Area: 55.88 km^{2} (21.58 sq mi)
- Elevation: 350 m (1,150 ft)
- Population (2021-12-01): 5,414
  - Density: 96.89/km^{2} (250.9/sq mi)
- Time zone: UTC+02:00 (EET)
  - Summer (DST): UTC+03:00 (EEST)
- Postal code: 547410
- Area code: (+40) 02 65
- Vehicle reg.: MS
- Website: www.miercureanirajului.ro

Miercurea Nirajului (Hungarian: Nyárádszereda [ˈɲaːraːt.sɛrɛdɒ]) is a town in Mureș County, Romania. It lies in the Székely Land, an ethno-cultural region in eastern Transylvania. The following seven villages are administered by the town: Beu (Székelybő), Dumitreștii (Demeterfalva), Lăureni (Kisszentlőrinc), Moșuni (Székelymoson), Șardu Nirajului (Székelysárd), Tâmpa (Székelytompa), and Veța (Vece).

== Geography ==
The town is situated on the Transylvanian Plateau, on the banks of the river Niraj and its tributaries, the rivers Nirajul Mic and Valea spre Șardu. Miercurea Nirajului is located in the east-central part of Mureș County, 24 km (15 mi) due east of the county seat, Târgu Mureș.

== History ==
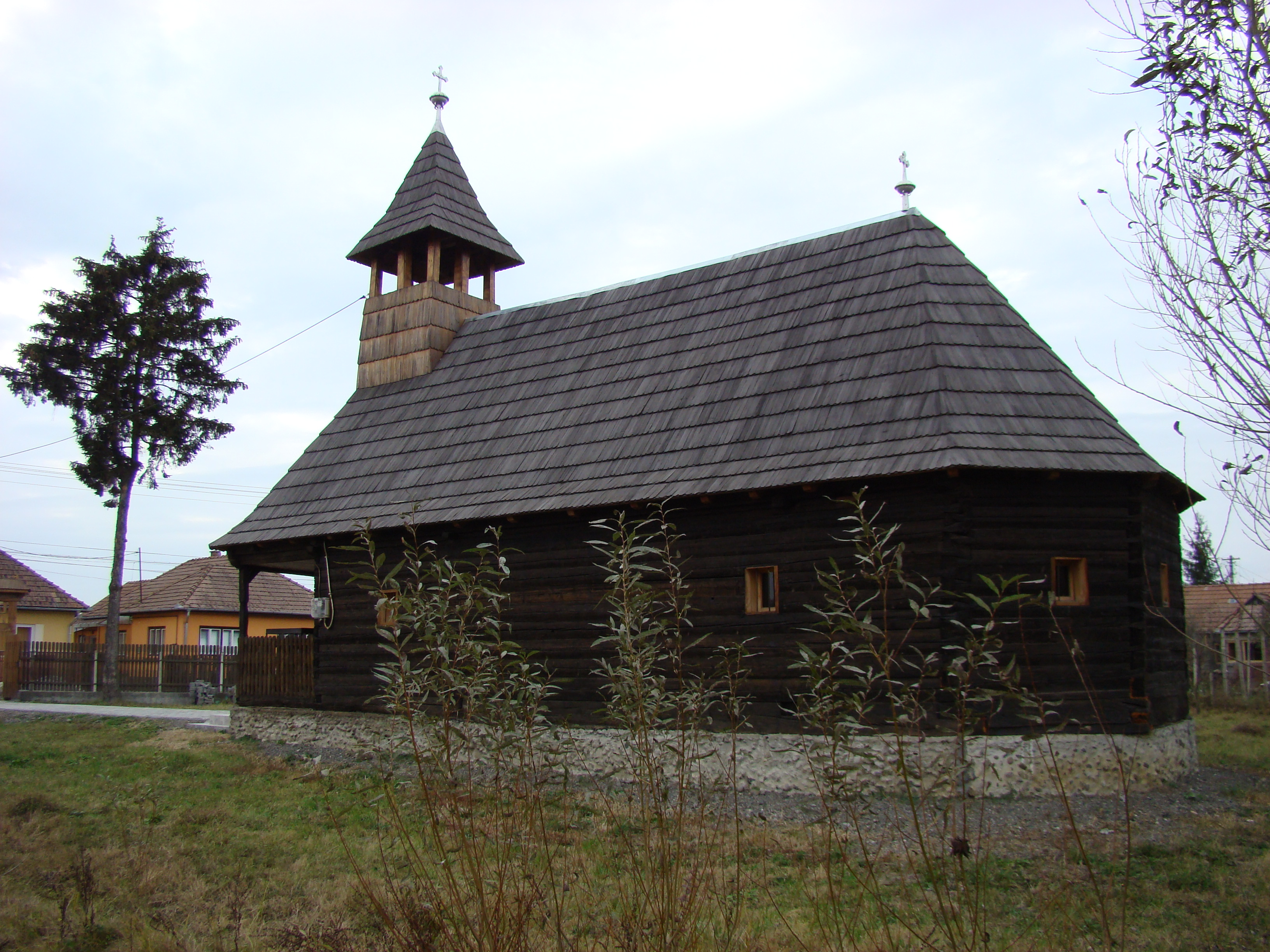
The wooden church

The town is part of the Székely Land region of the historical Transylvania province. Its first written mention is from 1493 as Oppidum Zereda. István Bocskay was elected here as prince of Transylvania in 1604.

Until 1918, the town belonged to the Maros-Torda County of the Kingdom of Hungary. After the Hungarian–Romanian War of 1918–19 and the Treaty of Trianon of 1920, it became part of Romania.

== Demographics ==
Historical population
Year	Pop.	±%
1850	3,003	—
1880	3,420	+13.9%
1900	4,698	+37.4%
1910	5,052	+7.5%
1930	4,955	−1.9%
1956	6,015	+21.4%
1977	6,127	+1.9%
1992	5,865	−4.3%
2002	5,824	−0.7%
2011	5,554	−4.6%
2021	5,414	−2.5%
Source: Census data

The commune has a Székely Hungarian majority. According to the 2011 census, it had a population of 5,554, of which 83.3% were Hungarians, 10.4% Romanians, and 6.3% Roma. At the 2021 census, Miercurea Nirajului had a population of 5,554; of those, 77.9% were Hungarians, 8.3% Romanians, and 6.46% Roma.

== Natives ==
- Zoltan Lunka (born 1970), boxer

== Economy ==
The town is the site of the Miercurea Nirajului gas field.

== Twin towns ==
Miercurea Nirajului is twinned with:

- Csorna, Hungary
