= Turda County =

Județul Turda
- County (Județ)
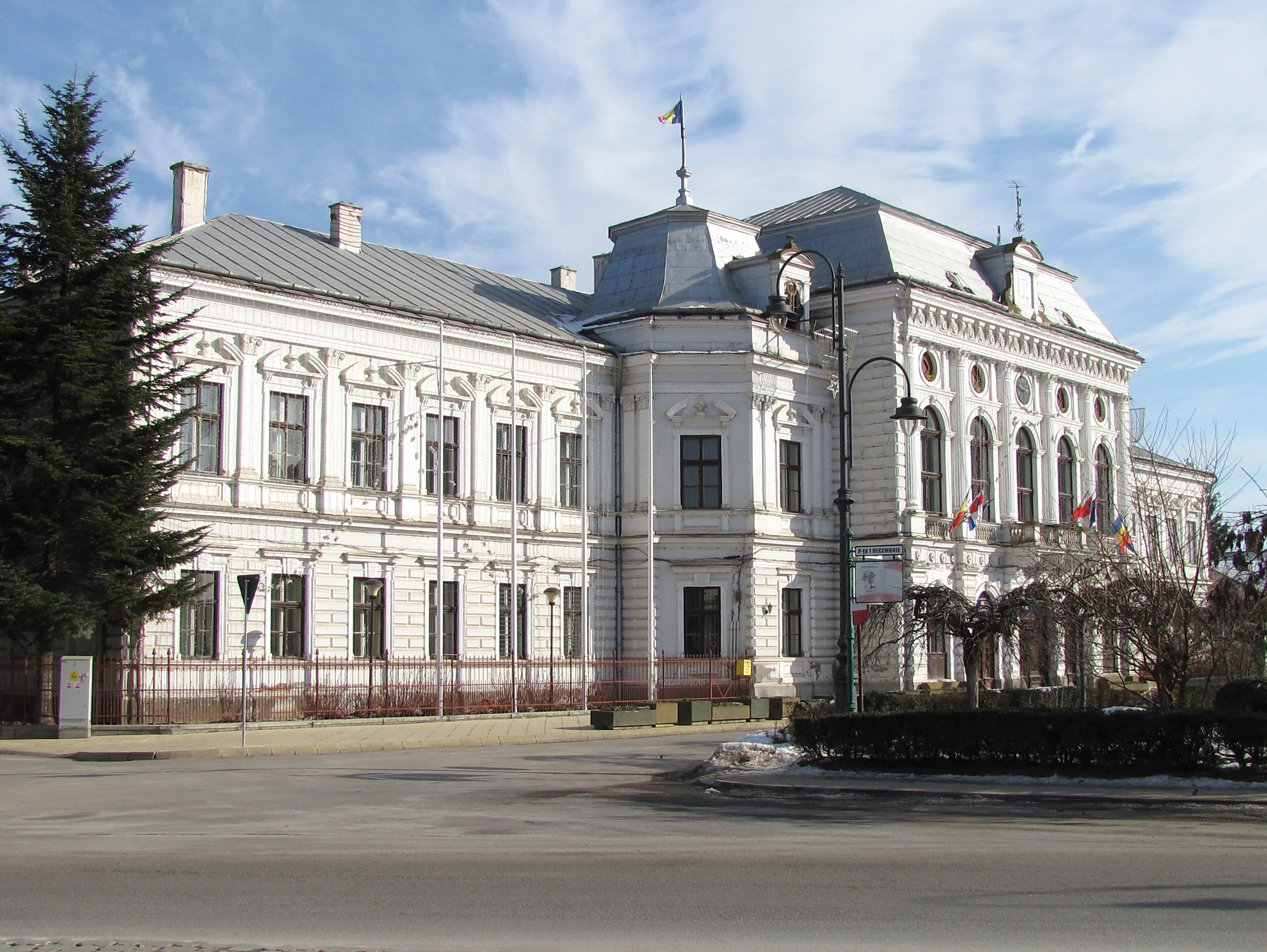
- Turda County prefecture building during the interwar period, now Turda city hall.

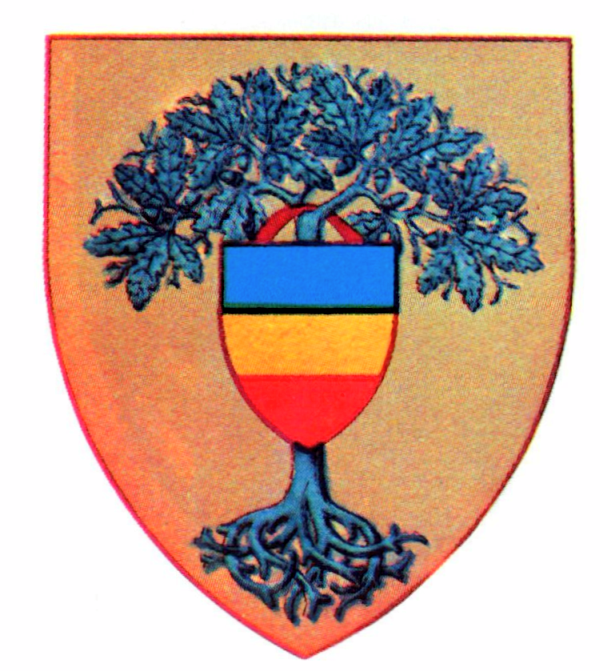
- Coat of arms

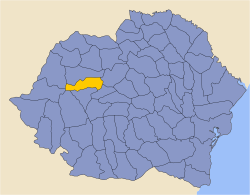
- Country: Romania
- Historic region: Transylvania
- Capital city (Reședință de județ): Turda
- Established: 1925
- Ceased to exist: Administrative reform of 1950

Area
  - Total: 3,158 km^{2} (1,219 sq mi)

Population (1930)
  - Total: 183,282
  - Density: 58.04/km^{2} (150.3/sq mi)
- Time zone: UTC+2 (EET)
  - Summer (DST): UTC+3 (EEST)

Turda County was a county (Romanian: județ) in the Kingdom of Romania, as successor to Torda-Aranyos County in Austria-Hungary. Its capital was Turda.

== Geography ==
Turda County covered 3,158 km^{2} (1,219 sq mi) and was located in central western part of Greater Romania, in the western part of Transylvania. Its borders were as follows: to the north, Cluj County; to the west the counties of Bihor and Arad; to the south, the counties of Hunedoara and Alba; and to the east the counties of Târnava Mică and Mureș. Currently, the territory that comprised the greater part of Turda County is now part of Cluj County, Mureș County, and Alba County.

== Historical County ==
Prior to World War I, the territory of the county belonged to Austria-Hungary and was almost identical with the Torda-Aranyos County of the Kingdom of Hungary. The territory was transferred to Romania from Hungary as successor state to Austria-Hungary in 1920 under the Treaty of Trianon. The county's Romanian name became Turda-Arieș County, identical with its predecessor (Comitatul Turda-Arieș).

In 1924, Romanian authorities renamed a number of populated places: Copăceni (previous name: Copand), Săndulești (Sând), Petrești (Petrid), Deleni (Indol), Tureni (Tur), Borzești (Berchiș), Comșești (Comițig), Mărtinești (Sânmărtinul Deșert), Vâlcele (Banabic), Pruniș (Silivaș), Cheia (Mischiu), Mihai Viteazu (Sânmihaiu), Cornești (Sinfalău), Moldovenești (Varfalău), Plăiești (Chiend), Pietroasa (Ceagz), Călărași (Hărastăș), Stejeriș (Cârcedea), Măhăceni (Măhaci), Dumbrava (Dumbrău), Unirea (Vințu de Sus), Războieni (Cucerdea), Iacobeni (Sâniacob), Viișoara (Agârbiciu), Triteni (Tritiu), Valea Largă (Țicud), Bărboși (Săcal), Luncani (Grind), Hădăreni (Hădărău), Chețani (Cheța), Gligorești (Sânmărtinul Sărat), Gura Arieșului (Vaidasig), Oprișani (Cristiș), Podeni (Hidiș)

After the administrative unification law in 1925, the county was renamed to Turda County and its territory was reorganized. It was disestablished with the whole of the county system in 1938, but was re-established in 1940. The county was finally disestablished by the communist government of Romania in 1950.

== Administrative organization ==
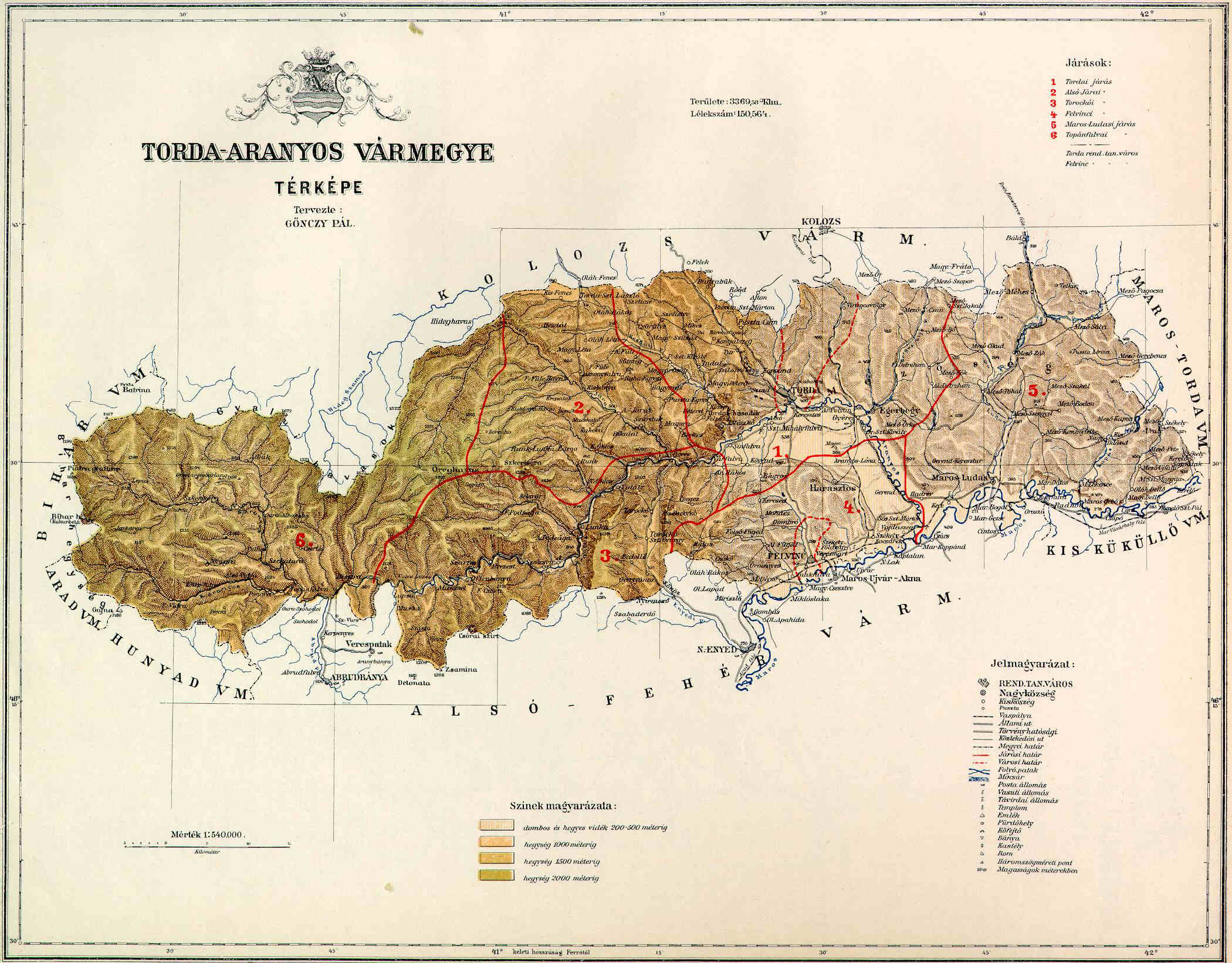
Turda County as transferred from Hungary and constituted prior to 1925.

Administratively, when the territory was transferred from Hungary, Turda-Arieș County was provisionally divided in six districts (plăși):

1. Plasa Baia de Arieș, headquartered at Baia de Arieș, which included the following rural communes: Baia de Arieș, Bedeleu, Brăzești, Buru, Ceagz, Cioara de Sus, Lunca, Lupșa, Moldovenești, Muncel, Ocolișul Mare, Ocolișul Mic, Poșaga de Jos, Poșaga de Sus, Runc, Sălciua de Jos, Sălciua de Sus, Sângeorgiu, Sartăș, Sasavința, Trăscău, Vidolm
2. Plasa Câmpeni, headquartered at Câmpeni, which included the following rural communes: Albac, Bistra, Câmpeni, Certegea, Neagra, Ponorel, Scărișoara, Vidra de Jos, Vidra de Sus
3. Plasa Iara, headquartered at Iara, which included the following rural communes: Agriș, Băișoara, Berchiș, Bicălat, Cacova Ierii, Feneșel, Filea de Sus, Filea de Jos, Hășdate, Hăsmaș, Iara de Jos, Lita Română, Lita Ungurească, Măgura, Muerău, Muntele Băișoarei, Rachișul de Arieș, Rachișul Român, Săcel, Săvădisla, Șchiopi, Surduc, Șuțu.
4. Plasa Luduș, headquartered at Luduș, which included the following rural communes: Bogata de Mureș, Budiul de Câmpie, Căpușul de Câmpie, Cheța, Chimitelnicul de Câmpie, Dateș, Dileul Român, Dileul Unguresc, Grebenișu de Câmpie, Grind-Cristur, Hădărău, Iclandul Mare, Iclănzel, Lechința de Mureș, Ludoșul de Mureș, Miheșu de Câmpie, Oarba de Mureș, Oroiul de Câmpie, Petea de Câmpie, Săcalul de Câmpie, Sânger de Câmpie, Sânmarghita, Șăulia, Șăușa de Câmpie, Tăureni, Țicud, Vaidei de Câmpie, Velcheriul de Câmpie, Zău.
5. Plasa Turda, headquartered at Turda, which included the following rural communes: Agârbiciu, Bagiu, Banabic, Beiul de Câmpie, Ceanul Deșert, Ceanu Mare, Chiend, Ciurila, Coc, Comițig, Copand, Cornești, Cristiș, Ghiriș-Arieș, Ghiriș-Sâncraiu, Indol, Micuș, Mischiu, Petridul de Jos, Petridul de Mijloc, Petridul de Sus, Poiana de Arieș, Pusta Sâncraiu or Sâncraiu Deșert, Sălicea, Săliște, Sând, Sâniacob, Sânmartinul Deșert, Sânmihaiul de Jos, Sânmihaiul de Sus, Silvașul Unguresc, Tritul de Jos, Tritul de Sus, Tur, Urca.
6. Plasa Vințul de Sus, headquartered at Vințul de Sus, which included the following rural communes: Cârcedea, Cicău, Ciugudul de Jos, Ciugudul de Sus, Cucerdea, Decea, Dumbrău, Feldioara-Războieni, Grind, Hărastăș, Hidiș, Inoc, Luna de Arieș, Măhaciu, Ormeniș, Sânmartinul Sărat, Vaidasig, Vereșmort, Vințul de Sus.

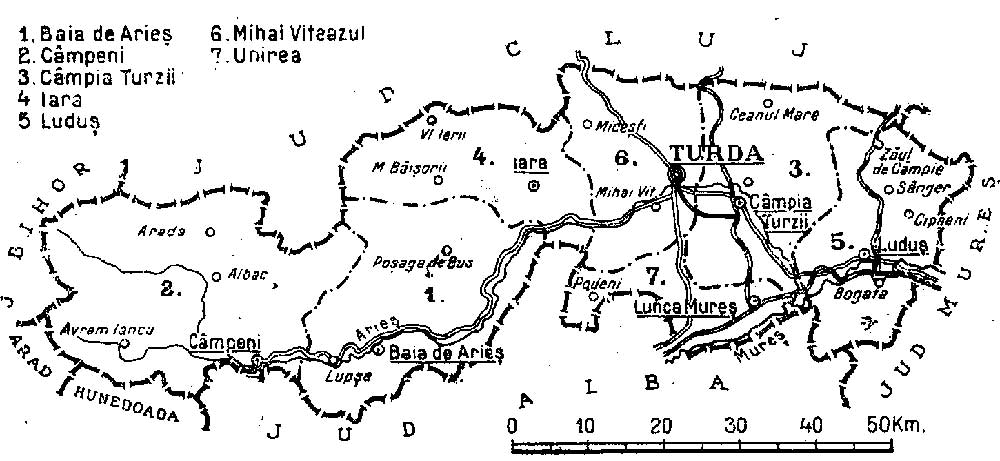
Map of Turda County as constituted in 1938.

The Law of Administrative Unification of 19 June 1925, promulgated by Royal Decree No. 1972 of 13 June 1925, ended the provisional administrative organization and provided for rules of unitary organization of the Romanian state. The territorial administrative units in Romania were: counties (led by prefects), settlements (led by praetors), urban and rural municipalities, and villages (all led by mayors). Turda County was reorganized into six districts (plăși):

1. Plasa Baia de Arieș, headquartered at Baia de Arieș
2. Plasa Câmpeni, headquartered at Câmpeni
3. Plasa Câmpia Turzii, headquartered at Câmpia Turzii
4. Plasa Iara, headquartered at Iara
5. Plasa Luduș, headquartered at Luduș
6. Plasa Mihai Viteazul, headquartered at Mihai Viteazul

Later, a seventh district was established by reorganizing the territories of Plasa Mihai Viteazul, Plasa Câmpia Turzii, and Plasa Luduș:

7. Plasa Unirea, headquartered at Unirea

== Settlements ==
=== Urban ===
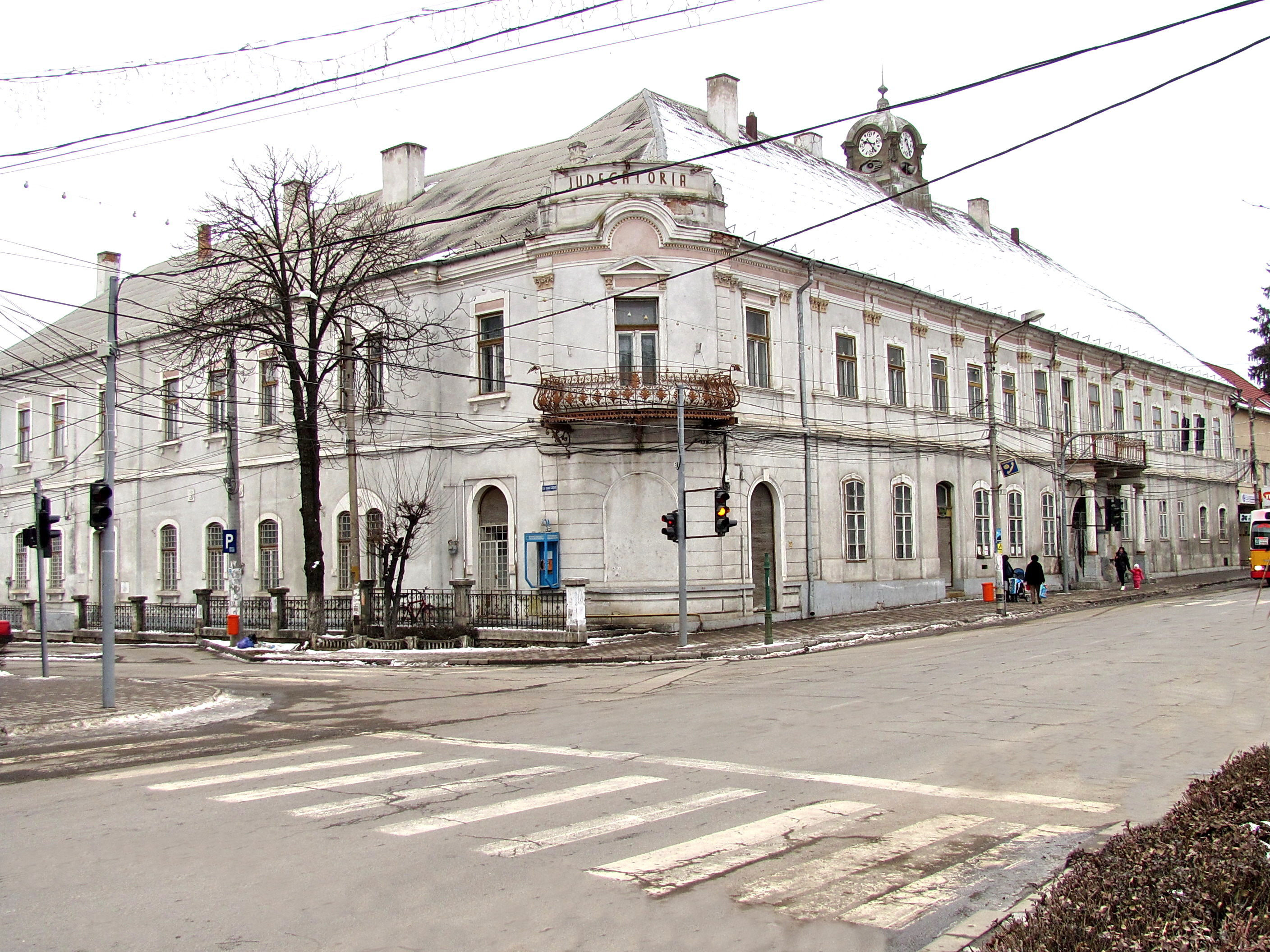
The Turda County Court Building of the interwar period. Over time, the building has been the Turda mayor's office, the local court, and a penitentiary.

Turda County had a single urban commune, Turda, which was the county seat. The town had about 16,000 inhabitants (at the 1920 census) and over 20,000 inhabitants (at the 1930 census) and was both an important industrial center and the residence of the county's main authorities. The public institutions that were in Turda were county government, the district government (until 24 June 1925, when it was moved to Câmpia Turzii), the city government, along with the police and security service, financial administration, and the bridge and road service. The judiciary was represented by the Turda District Court and the Ocol court. From the education point of view, Turda was the main center of the county, and included the school inspectorate, a state boys' high school, a Unitarian boys' high school, a Reformed/Calvinist school for girls, a school of agriculture, a horticultural school, a state middle school, two state primary schools, three religious primary schools (one Roman Catholic, one Reformed/Calvinist, and one Jewish). The city also had six religious communities (Greek Catholic, Romanian Orthodox, Reformed/Calvinist, Unitarian, Evangelical/Lutheran, and Jewish). The County Hospital in Turda was the main medical unit of the interwar county.

=== Rural communes ===
The 138 rural communes (according to the Socec al României Mari, 1924–1925 edition) were the following (with the names then): Agârbiciu, Agriș, Albac, Bagiu, Baia de Arieș, Băișoara, Banabic, Bedeleu, Beiul de Câmpie, Berchiș, Bicălat, Bistra, Bogata de Mureș, Brăzești, Budiul de Câmpie, Buru, Cacova Ierii, Câmpeni, Căpușul de Câmpie, Cârcedea, Ceagz, Ceanul Deșert, Ceanul Mare, Certegea, Cheța, Chiend, Chimitelnicul de Câmpie, Cicău, Cioara de Sus, Ciugudul de Jos, Ciugudul de Sus, Ciurila, Coc, Comițig, Copand, Cornești, Cristiș, Cucerdea, Dateș, Decea, Dileul Român, Dileul Unguresc, Dumbrău, Feldioara-Războieni, Feneșel, Filea de Sus, Filea de Jos, Ghiriș-Arieș, Ghiriș-Sâncraiu, Grebenișul de Câmpie, Grind, Grind-Cristur, Hădărău, Hărastăș, Hășdate, Hăsmaș, Hidiș, Iara de Jos, Iclandul Mare, Iclănzel, Indol, Inoc, Lechința de Mureș, Lita Română, Lita Ungurească, Ludoșul de Mureș, Luna de Arieș, Lunca, Lupșa, Măgura, Măhaciu, Micuș, Miheșul de Câmpie, Mischiu, Moldovenești, Muerău, Muncel, Muntele Băișoarei, Neagra, Oarba de Mureș, Ocolișul Mare, Ocolișul Mic, Ormeniș, Oroiul de Câmpie, Petea de Câmpie, Petridul de Jos, Petridul de Mijloc, Petridul de Sus, Poiana de Arieș, Ponorel, Poșaga de Jos, Poșaga de Sus, Pusta Sâncraiu sau Sâncraiu Deșert, Rachișul de Arieș, Rachișul Român, Runc, Săcalul de Câmpie, Săcel, Sălciua de Jos, Sălciua de Sus, Sălicea, Săliște, Sând, Sângeorgiu, Sânger de Câmpie, Sâniacob, Sânmarghita, Sânmartinul Deșert, Sânmartinul Sărat, Sânmihaiul de Jos, Sânmihaiul de Sus, Sartăș, Sasavința, Șăulia, Șăușa de Câmpie, Săvădisla, Scărișoara, Șchiopi, Silvașul Unguresc, Surduc, Șuțu, Tăureni, Țicud, Trăscău, Tritul de Jos, Tritul de Sus, Tur, Urca, Vaidasig, Vaidei de Câmpie, Velcheriul de Câmpie, Vereșmort, Vidolm, Vidra de Jos, Vidra de Sus, Vințul de Sus, Zău.

== Economy ==
The agriculture of Turda County was developed, being practiced on large cultivated lands. The trade was active, generally with products of the county, the center of sales being the city of Turda. The industry was concentrated in Turda. The following factories were operating in that city: one of carbonated water, one of beer, one cement, two distilleries, one of furniture, one of leather, one of chemicals, one of soap, one of glass, one of lime, and a foundry. Apart from these industrial units, there were carbonated waters, bricks, tiles, woodcutters, mills, water mills, vinegar, leather, wire, spirits, and paints on the territory of the county.

== Education ==
- High schools and secondary schools: 2 state lyceums for boys (in Turda and in Câmpeni), one religious high school for boys, 1 trade school for girls, 1 agricultural school, 1 horticultural school.
- Primary schools: 52 Romanian, 10 Hungarian.
- Religious schools: 96 Romanian schools (52 Greek Catholic, 44 Orthodox), 10 Hungarian schools (4 Roman Catholic, 4 Reformed/Calvinist, 2 Unitarian), 2 Jewish schools.

== Population ==
According to the Romanian census of 1930 the population of Turda County was 183,282, of which 74.4% were ethnic Romanians, 21.4% Hungarians, 2.3% Romanies, 1.2% Jews, as well as other minorities. Classified by mother tongue: the Romanian language predominated (75.1%), followed by Hungarian (22.2%), and Romany (1.2%), as well as other minorities. Classified by religion: 42.3% were Greek Catholic, 33.1% Eastern Orthodox, 13.3% Reformed (Calvinist), 4.5% Unitarian, 4.1% Roman Catholic, as well as other minorities.

The population distribution of the county by city and administrative district was as follows:

Administrative entity	Population	Men	Women
Turda (city)	20,057	9,882	10,175
Total rural	161,896	80,295	81,601
1. Plasa Baia de Arieș	15,162	7,493	7,669
2. Plasa Câmpeni	35,986	17,990	17,996
3. Plasa Câmpia Turzii	31,883	15,707	16,176
4. Plasa Iara	16,996	8,462	8,424
5. Plasa Luduș	33,230	16,486	16,744
6. Plasa Mihai Viteazul	28,749	14,157	14,592

=== Urban population ===
In 1930 the urban population of Turda County was 20,023 (the city of Turda), and comprised 49.7% Hungarians, 38.9% Romanians, 4.3% Jews, 2.6% Germans, 2.4% Romanies by ethnicity, as well as other minorities. By mother tongue among the urban population, Hungarian predominated (53.1%), followed by Romanian (39.0%), German (2.7%), Yiddish (2.2%), Romany (1.2%), and others. The religious mix of the urban population was 30.9% Reformed/Calvinist, 26.0% Greek Catholic, 15.7% Roman Catholic, 12.0% Eastern Orthodox, 9.2% Unitarian, 4.3% Jewish, as well as other minorities.
