= Zau de Câmpie =

- Commune
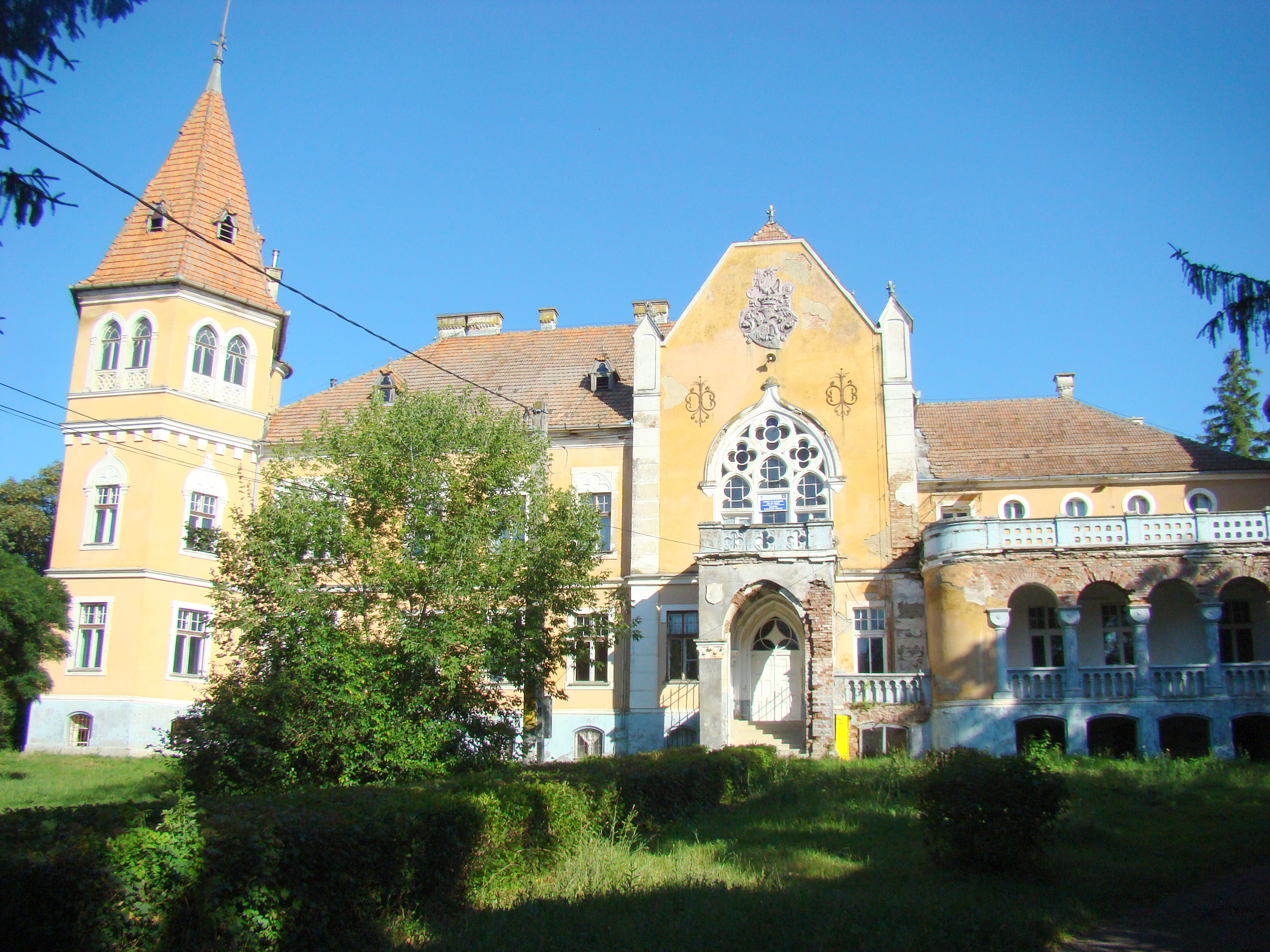
- Ugron Castle

- Location in Mureș County

- Location in Romania
- Coordinates: 46°37′N 24°08′E
- Country: Romania
- County: Mureș

Government
  - Mayor (2020–2024): Alexandru Iurian (PNL)
- Area: 50.15 km^{2} (19.36 sq mi)
- Elevation: 307 m (1,007 ft)
- Population (2021-12-01): 3,108
  - Density: 61.97/km^{2} (160.5/sq mi)
- Time zone: UTC+02:00 (EET)
  - Summer (DST): UTC+03:00 (EEST)
- Postal code: 547660
- Area code: (+40) 02 65
- Vehicle reg.: MS
- Website: zaudecimpie.ro

Zau de Câmpie (Hungarian: Mezőzáh, Hungarian pronunciation:[ˈmɛzøːzaːh]) is a commune in Mureș County, Transylvania, Romania composed of nine villages: Bărboși (Mezőszakál), Botei (Botadűlő), Bujor-Hodaie (Bozsortanya), Ciretea (Bábod), Gaura Sângerului (Szengyelisuvadás), Malea (Boriskadűlő), Ștefăneaca, Tău (Mezőszélen), and Zau de Câmpie.

== Geography ==
The commune is situated in the Transylvanian Plain, at an altitude of 307 m (1,007 ft). It lies on the banks of Pârâul de Câmpie (a right tributary of the river Mureș), which forms a string of lakes through the locality.

Zau de Câmpie is located in the western part of the county, 19 km (12 mi) from the town of Luduș and 41 km (25 mi) from de county seat, Târgu Mureș. It borders the following communes: Șăulia and Papiu Ilarian to the east, Valea Largă to the west, Miheșu de Câmpie to the north, and Tăureni to the south. Zau de Câmpie is crossed by county road DJ151, which runs from Luduș straight north to Șintereag, in Bistrița-Năsăud County.

== History ==
After 1570, the settlement became part of the Principality of Transylvania. In 1876, it fell within the Torda-Aranyos County of the Kingdom of Hungary. In the aftermath of World War I, the Union of Transylvania with Romania was declared in December 1918. At the start of the Hungarian–Romanian War of 1918–1919, the locality passed under Romanian administration; after the Treaty of Trianon of 1920, it became part of the Kingdom of Romania. In 1925, the commune fell within Plasa Luduș of Turda County.

After the advent of the Romanian People's Republic, Zau de Câmpie became in 1950 part of the Turda raion of Cluj Region. Between 1952 and 1960, it fell within the Magyar Autonomous Region, and between 1960 and 1968, the Mureș-Magyar Autonomous Region. In 1968, the region was abolished, and since then, the commune has been part of Mureș County.

=== The Zau de Câmpie gas field ===
The first natural gas deposit in Romania was discovered in 1909, in Sărmașel, about 22 km (14 mi) north of the commune. In 1913, the first production of methane gas was recorded from the drilling site at the Sărmașel gas field. That year, the local Greek Catholic priest announced to his flock that they will start "to dig for gas, in the form of the one from Sărmașel," on a 2,400 m^{2} (26,000 sq ft) plot of land belonging to the church. The Zau de Câmpie gas field was discovered in 1914, when the first gas extraction fields were created; it supplied Târnăveni and Târgu Mureș with natural gas.

== Demographics ==
Historical population
Year	Pop.	±%
1850	1,787	—
1880	1,888	+5.7%
1900	2,561	+35.6%
1910	2,727	+6.5%
1920	2,757	+1.1%
1930	3,091	+12.1%
1956	4,352	+40.8%
1977	4,051	−6.9%
1992	3,562	−12.1%
2002	3,509	−1.5%
2011	3,236	−7.8%
2021	3,108	−4.0%
Source: Census data

At the 2002 census, the commune had a population of 3,509, of which 80% were Romanians, 11% Roma, and 9% Hungarians. At the 2011 census, there were 3,236 inhabitants, of which 79.64% were Romanians, 10.11% Roma, and 7.42% Hungarians. At the 2021 census, Zau de Câmpie had a population of 3,108, of which 79.31% were Romanians, 9.97% Roma, and 5.69% Hungarians.

== Natives ==
- Sabin Gherman (born 1968), journalist

== See also ==
- List of Hungarian exonyms (Mureș County)
