= Ștefanca =

Ștefanca may refer to several villages in Romania:

- Ștefanca, a village in Bistra Commune, Alba County
- Ștefanca, a village in Miheșu de Câmpie Commune, Mureș County
