= Gligorești =

Gligoreşti may refer to several villages in Romania:

- Gligoreşti, a village in Vidra Commune, Alba County
- Gligoreşti, a village in Luna Commune, Cluj County
