= Valea Glodului =

Valea Glodului may refer to several villages in Romania:

- Valea Glodului, a village in Valea Largă Commune, Mureș County
- Valea Glodului, a village in Vulturești Commune, Suceava County
