= Ercea =

Ercea may refer to several villages in Romania:

- Ercea, a village in Căzăneşti Commune, Mehedinţi County
- Ercea, a village in Băla Commune, Mureș County
