= Sânmărghita =

Sânmărghita may refer to several villages in Romania:

- Sânmărghita, a village in Mica Commune, Cluj County
- Sânmărghita, a village in Sânpaul Commune, Mureș County
