= Răzoare =

Răzoare may refer to several places in Romania:

- Răzoare, a neighborhood in Bucharest
- Răzoare, a village in Frata Commune, Cluj County
- Răzoare, a village in the town of Târgu Lăpuş, Maramureș County
- Răzoare, a village in Miheșu de Câmpie Commune, Mureș County
