= Unirea, Alba =

Unirea Vințu de Sus
- Commune
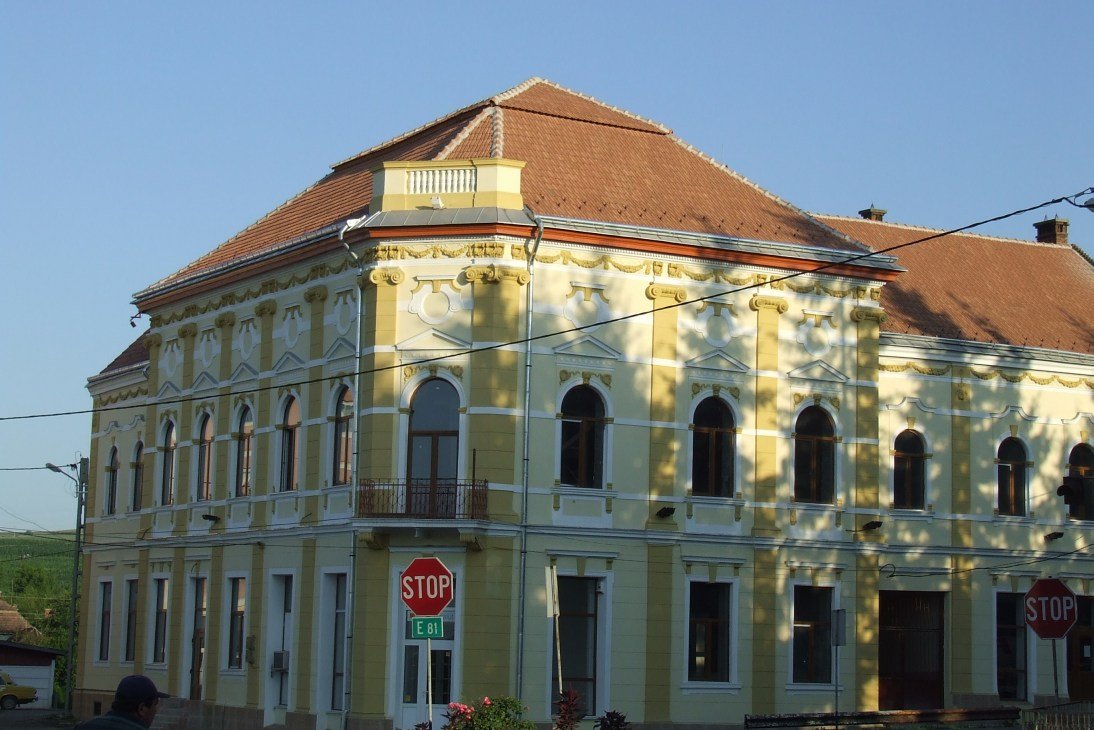
- Community center in Unirea

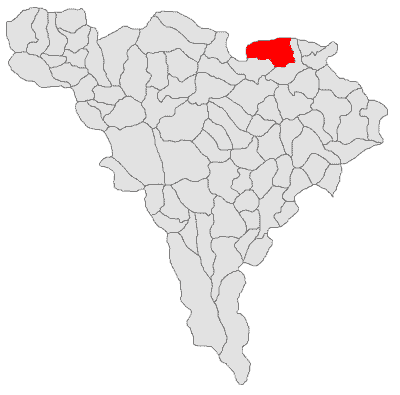
- Location of Unirea

- Location in Romania
- Coordinates: 46°24′N 23°49′E
- Country: Romania
- County: Alba
- Subdivisions: Ciugudu de Jos, Ciugudu de Sus, Dumbrava, Inoc, Măhăceni, Unirea

Government
  - Mayor (2020–2024): Gheorghe Alba (PNL)
- Area: 99.99 km^{2} (38.61 sq mi)
- Elevation: 272 m (892 ft)
- Population (2021-12-01): 4,497
  - Density: 44.97/km^{2} (116.5/sq mi)
- Time zone: UTC+02:00 (EET)
  - Summer (DST): UTC+03:00 (EEST)
- Postal code: 517785
- Area code: (+40) 0258
- Vehicle reg.: AB
- Website: www.primariaunireaalba.ro

Unirea, previously Vințu de Sus (Hungarian: Felvinc, German: Oberwinz), is a commune located in the north-east of Alba County, Transylvania, Romania. It is composed of six villages: Ciugudu de Jos (Alfüged), Ciugudu de Sus (Felfüged), Dumbrava (Dombró), Inoc (Inakfalva), Măhăceni (Aranyosmohács), and Unirea.

== Geography ==
Unirea is located on the Mureș River, in the north-east corner of Alba County, approximately 50 km (31 mi) from the county capital, Alba Iulia, and 20 km (12 mi) from the town of Turda, on the Romanian National Road DN1. The commune is bordered by Cluj County in the north and west, the town of Ocna Mureș in the east, and the commune of Mirăslău in the south.

The Unirea train station and the Unirea halt serve the CFR main line 300, which connects Bucharest with the Hungarian border near Oradea.

== History ==
From the late 13th century until 1876 the centre of today's commune was the administrative centre of the Aranyosszék region of Transylvania. In 1876, when the administrative system of the Kingdom of Hungary was reorganised, it became part of Torda-Aranyos county.

After the Union of Transylvania with Romania in 1918, the commune became part of Turda County. Since 1968, when the latest administrative organisation in Romania was adopted, Unirea has been part of Alba County.

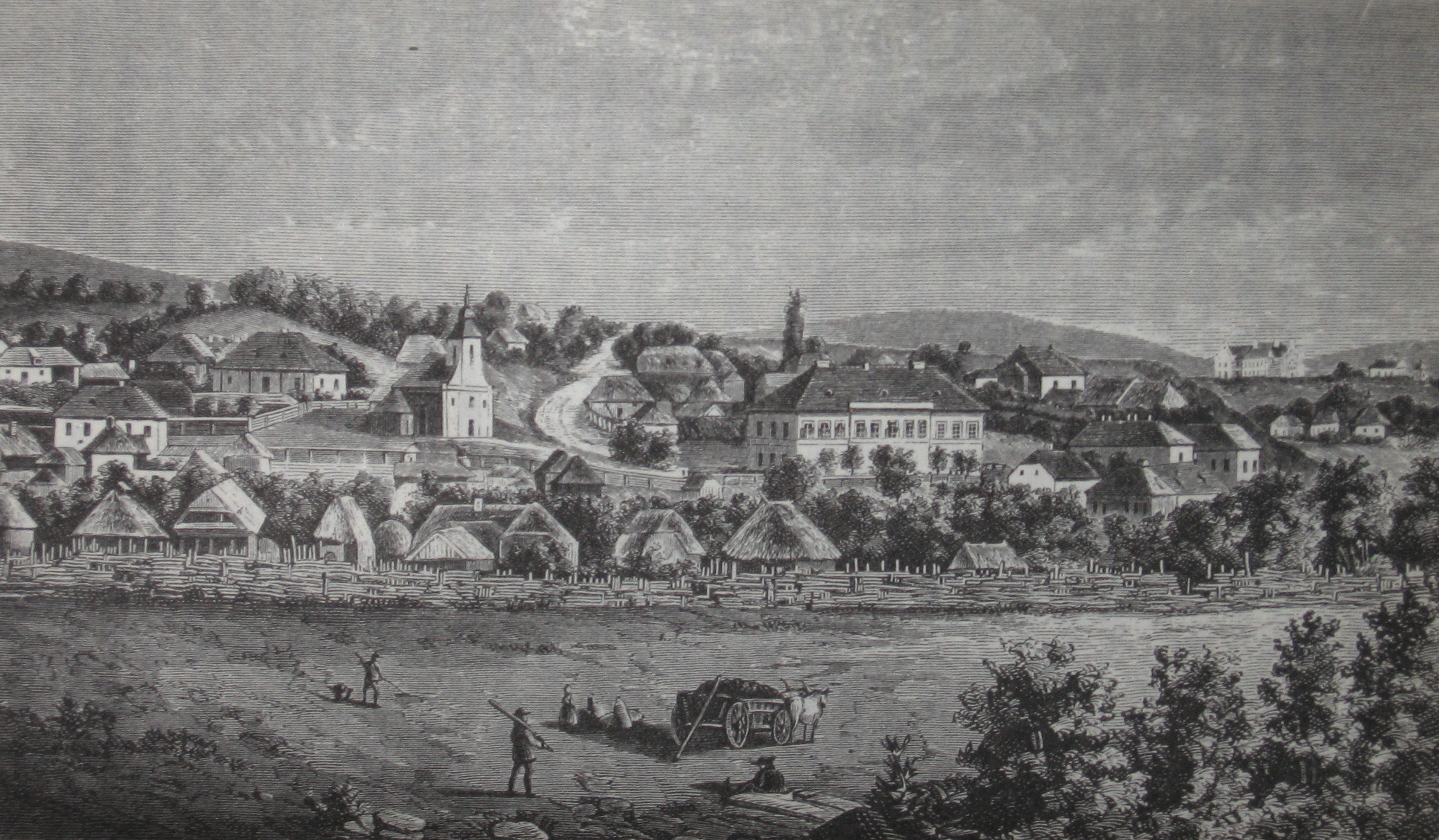
Unirea, then Felvinc/Vințu de Sus, in the 19th century

== Name ==
The first documentary evidence of the commune dates from 1219 under the names Vynch superior, terra Wynchy, Oronos Winch, and Oranas Wincz.

The Romanian version of the name, Vințu de Sus, became official only after the Union of Transylvania with Romania in 1918. Other early Romanian names were Vinț and Felvinț. In 1925, the official name was changed to Unirea referring to the unification of Vințu de Sus and Vereșmart.

The Hungarian version of the name, Felvinc was mentioned for the first time in a document from 1291 in the form Felvynch. As part of the Kingdom of Hungary, the Hungarian version was consistently used throughout the Middle Ages, with the mention that sometimes the form Aranyosvinc and Felső-Vincz were also used. In the 18th and the 19th century, the official name was "Oppidum Felvincz" (from 1760) or "Felvincz mezőváros" (from 1713).

The German version of the name, Oberwintz, dates to 1532.

All the three names are related to each other meaning Upper Vinc/Vințu/Wintz in English. The name refers to the medieval patron of the Catholic parish, Saint Vincentius because a 13th-century document calls the town Sanctus Vincentius.

== Demographics ==
The 2011 census recorded that 4,574 people were living at the time in the commune, of whom 3,233 (70.7%) Romanians, 820 (17.9%) Roma, and 514 (11.2%) Hungarians. At the 2021 census, Unirea had a population of 4,497; of those, 69.91% were Romanians, 12.99% Roma, and 8.07% Hungarians.

=== Historical population ===
The historical population of the entire commune as recorded by the official censuses, and projected to the present-day administrative unit, was as follows:

Year	Total	Romanians	Hungarians	Roma
1850	4,541	69.3%	23.9%	6.5%
1880	4,636	63.0%	30.2%	n/a
1890	5,499	62.7%	31.6%	n/a
1900	5,553	64.3%	29.7%	n/a
1910	6,234	64.6%	30.4%	n/a
1920	5,887	71.6%	27.9%	n/a
1930	6,456	70.5%	22.8%	2.6%
1941	6,981	78.3%	19.4%	n/a
1956	6,649	74.7%	19.0%	6.0%
1966	6,991	80.9%	17.3%	1.7%
1977	7,089	78.1%	16.9%	4.9%
1992	5,723	74.1%	14.2%	11.6%
2002	5,506	74.4%	12.0%	13.6%
2011	4,574	70.7%	11.2%	17.9%
2021	4,497	69.9%	8%	13%

The historical population of Unirea village only (excluding the other 5 villages), as recorded by the official Censuses, was as follows:

Year	Total	Romanians	Hungarians
1850	1,207	1%	88%
1880	1,609	8%	78%
1890	1,856	7%	88%
1900	1,840	6%	82%
1910	2,088	9%	85%
1920	1,892	14%	85%
1930	2,960	45%	51%
1941	3,280	58%	41%
1956	3,318	n/a	n/a
1966	3,993	67%	30%
1977	4,409	67%	27%
1992	3,924	65%	21%
2002	3,913	67%	17%

In 1925 the village of Vereșmart (largely Romanian), formerly considered as a separate village, was united with the village of Vințu de Sus (largely Hungarian), to form the village called Unirea. This resulted in an important increase in population, and a change in the ethnic composition of the village.

=== Minorities ===
While the share of the Romanian majority in the territory of the present-day commune has remained almost constant since the mid-19th century (with a slight 5% increase), the two main minorities, the Hungarians and the Roma, have experienced opposite trends. While the percentage of the Hungarian minority almost halved in that time period, the percentage of the Roma minority more than doubled. This resulted in a swap between the Hungarian and the Roma communities as the second and the third most important ethnic groups in Unirea. Numerically, the Hungarian population increased from 1,084 in 1850 to a peak of 1,898 in 1910 and has been gradually declining ever since. The last census of the 20th century recorded 810 Hungarians, which means that their community declined by more than half in 80 years. The number of Roma people increased from 398 in 1930 to 556 (or 14% of the population) in 1992

Unirea village, due to its status as centre of the commune, has been the only village that recorded a population increase since the mid-19th century. Thus, while the population of some of the other villages halved, the total population of Unirea village more than tripled. Because almost all of the Hungarians in the commune (98% of them) were already living in the centre of the commune, this increase in total population, combined with the dwindling numbers of Hungarians, meant that the share of the Hungarian community decreased and the ethnic composition of the Unirea village changed in the 20th century to become more similar with the ethnic composition of the Unirea commune. The last census to record a Hungarian majority in Unirea village was the 1930 census and starting with the 1941 census, a Romanian majority has been recorded.

The village was traditionally the centre of the Székelys of Aranyosszék, a subgroup of the Székelys.

== Natives ==
- Coriolan Suciu (1895–1967), teacher, historian, and a priest in the Greek-Catholic Church
- Leon Șușman (1910–1957), member of the Iron Guard and later a leader of an anti-communist paramilitary group
