= Coriolan Suciu =

Coriolan Suciu (19 December 1895–27 January 1967) was an Austro-Hungarian-born Romanian teacher and historian, and a priest in the Romanian Greek-Catholic Church.

== Biography ==
Born in Ciugudu de Jos, Alba County, in the Transylvania region, he attended gymnasium from 1906 to 1914 and studied theology from 1914 to 1917 in nearby Blaj. He then studied history and Latin at Budapest and Cluj from 1917 to 1919, attended specialty courses in Paris from 1921 to 1922 and, following the union of Transylvania with Romania and the creation of Superior Dacia University, obtained a doctorate there in 1922. In Blaj, he taught at Saint Basil High School from 1919, was director of the apprentices' school from 1929 to 1937, becoming head of the normal school in 1937 and holding a similar position at Saint Basil from 1941 to 1945.

Between 1945 and 1956, he worked as a professor at Inocențiu Micu Klein High School in Cluj, where for a time he served as director. This period saw the onset of a communist regime and the outlawing of his church. Ordained a priest in 1926, he was made honorary archpriest in 1938. After 1956, he was an outside collaborator at the Cluj Institute of History and Archaeology. He published various works about the history of Transylvania. Suciu died in Cluj.
