= Moldovenești =

Moldovenești Orfalău, Varfalău Várfalva
- Commune
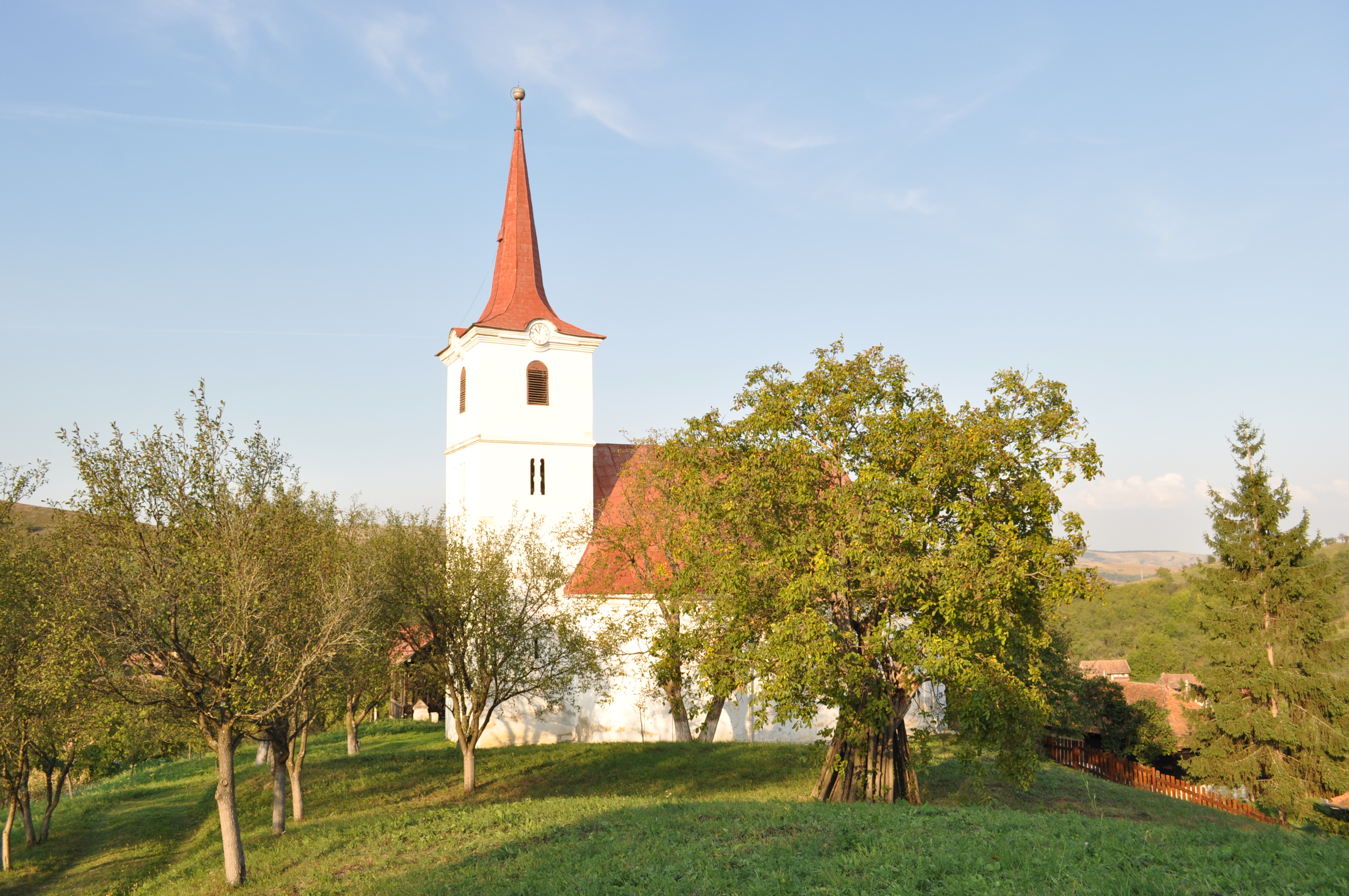
- Reformed church in Stejeriș

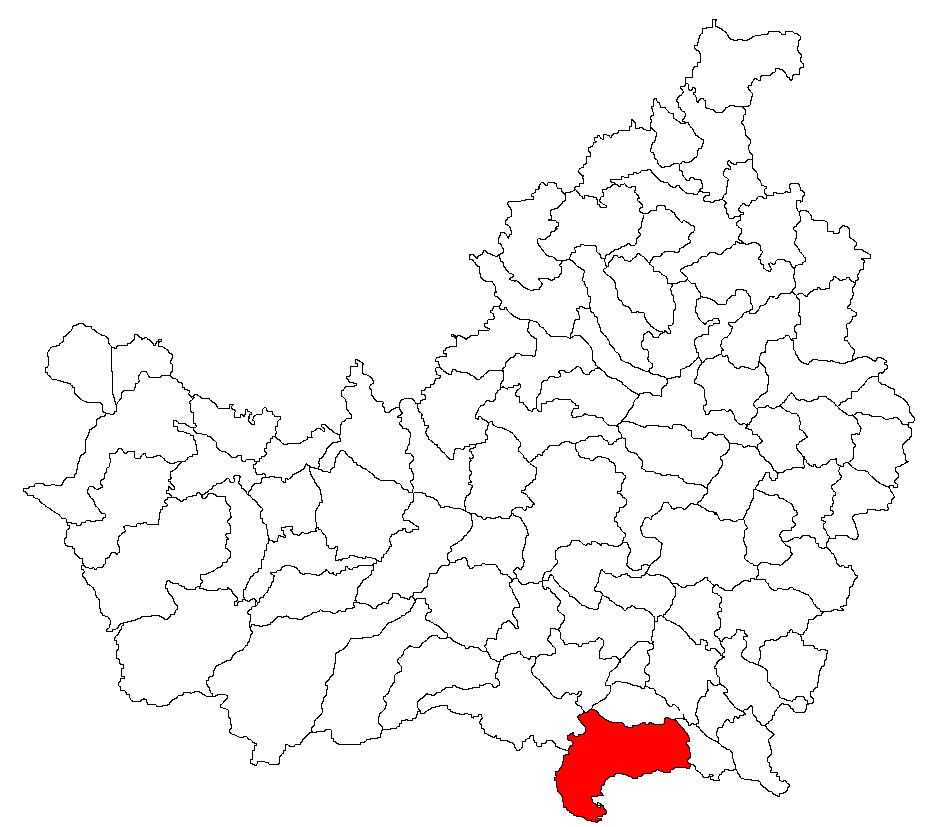
- Location in Cluj County

- Location in Romania
- Coordinates: 46°29′55″N 23°40′13″E
- Country: Romania
- County: Cluj
- Subdivisions: Bădeni, Moldovenești, Pietroasa, Plăiești, Podeni, Stejeriș

Government
  - Mayor (2020–2024): Ioan Mărginean (UDMR)
- Area: 139 km^{2} (54 sq mi)
- Elevation: 408 m (1,339 ft)
- Population (2021-12-01): 3,076
  - Density: 22.1/km^{2} (57.3/sq mi)
- Time zone: UTC+02:00 (EET)
  - Summer (DST): UTC+03:00 (EEST)
- Postal code: 407430
- Area code: +(40) x64
- Vehicle reg.: CJ
- Website: www.primariamoldovenesti.ro

Moldovenești (formerly Orfalău and Varfalău; Hungarian: Várfalva; German: Burgdorf) is a commune in Cluj County, Transylvania, Romania. It is composed of six villages: Bădeni (Bágyon), Moldovenești, Pietroasa (Csegez), Podeni (Székelyhidas), Plăiești (Kövend), and Stejeriș (Kercsed). Vălenii de Arieș (formerly Rachișul de Arieș or for short Rachiș; Aranyosrákos; Krebsbach) was a separate village until 1966, when it was absorbed into Moldovenești village.

== Geography ==
The commune is situated in the northern foothills of the Trascău Mountains, at an altitude of 408 m (1,339 ft), in the valley of the Arieș River. It is located in the southern part of Cluj County, 12 km (7.5 mi) southwest of Turda and 41 km (25 mi) south of the county seat, Cluj-Napoca, on the border with Alba County.

== History ==
The oldest record about the ancient castle at the village is from 1075, calling the place Castrum Turda (the old Turda Castle). During the Tatar invasions of Hungary in the 13th Century, most of the area around the castle was ravaged. Later, the land was given to free Székelys who moved here from the Saschiz region and the territory became part of Aranyos Seat. After the collapse of Austria-Hungary at the end of World War I, and the declaration of the Union of Transylvania with Romania, the Romanian Army took control of the area in December 1918, during the Hungarian–Romanian War. Moldovenești officially became part of the territory ceded to the Kingdom of Romania in June 1920 under the terms of the Treaty of Trianon. During the interwar period, the commune fell in Turda County, where it belonged to plasa Baia de Arieș (except for Rachișul de Arieș, which was in plasa Iara). After 1950, the commune became part of Turda raion within the Cluj Region; following the administrative reform of 1968, it became part of Cluj County.

Bădeni village has been the site of a crematorium since 2014.

== Etymology ==
The commune was renamed Moldovenești in the interwar period, in honour of Ioan Micu Moldovan. The previous name, Varfalău, is derived from Várfalva, which means "village of the castle" in Hungarian.

== Population ==
At the 2011 census, the commune had 3,317 inhabitants; of those, 56.6% were Hungarians, 39.6% Romanians, and 3.8% Roma. At the 2021 census, Moldovenești had a population of 3,076, of which 47.3% were Hungarians, 40.15% Romanians, and 3.77% Roma.

== Natives ==
- Ioan Micu Moldovan (1833 – 1915), historian and theologian, member of the Romanian Academy
