= Grebenișu de Câmpie =

- Commune
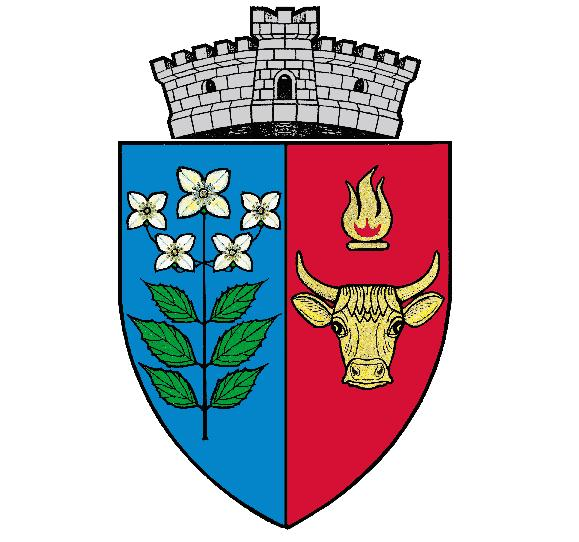
- Coat of arms

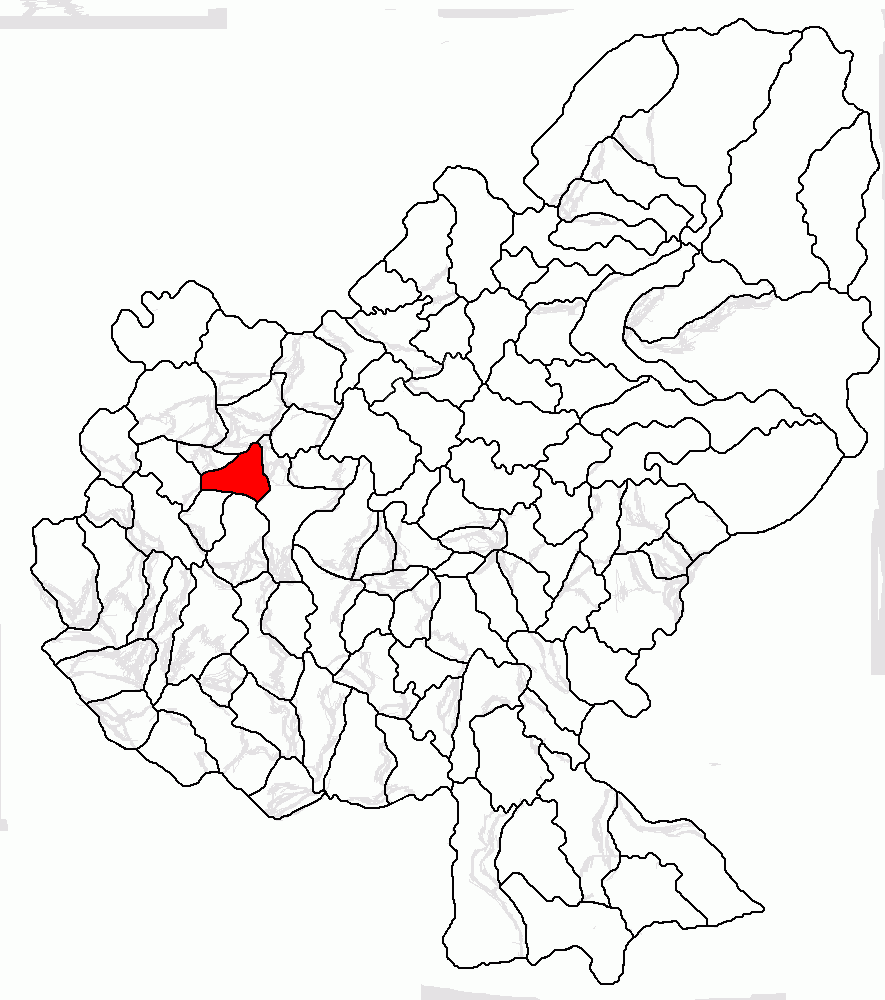
- Location in Mureș County

- Location in Romania
- Coordinates: 46.6°N 24.3°E
- Country: Romania
- County: Mureș

Government
  - Mayor (2024–2028): Lucian-Horică Dobrău (Ind.)
- Area: 28.03 km^{2} (10.82 sq mi)
- Elevation: 326 m (1,070 ft)
- Population (2021-12-01): 1,681
  - Density: 59.97/km^{2} (155.3/sq mi)
- Time zone: UTC+02:00 (EET)
  - Summer (DST): UTC+03:00 (EEST)
- Postal code: 547290
- Area code: (+40) 02 65
- Vehicle reg.: MS
- Website: grebenisudecimpie.ro

Grebenișu de Câmpie (Hungarian: Mezőgerebenes, Hungarian pronunciation: [ˈmɛzøːɡɛrɛbɛnɛʃ]) is a commune in Mureș County, Transylvania, Romania. It is composed of three villages: Grebenișu de Câmpie, Leorința (Lőrinci), and Valea Sânpetrului (Szentpéterivölgy).

The commune lies in the Transylvanian Plain, on the banks of the Hârtoape creek (a tributary of the river Lechința). It is located in the western part of the county, 27 km (17 mi) northwest of the county seat, Târgu Mureș.

At the 2021 census, the commune had a population of 1,681; of those, 84.18% were Romanians and 8.98% Roma.
