= Săvădisla =

Săvădisla Tordaszentlászló
- Commune
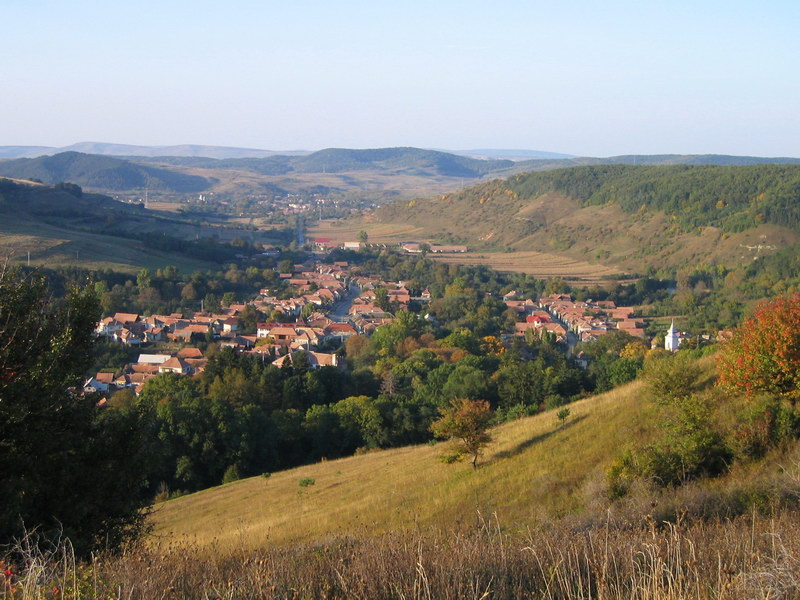

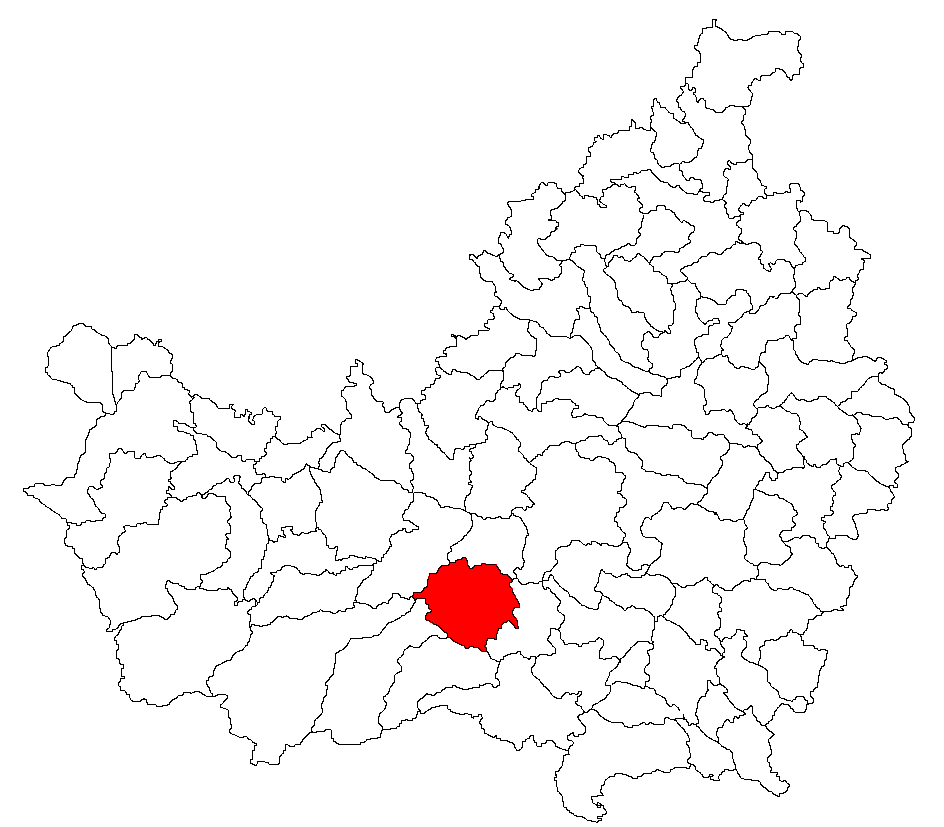
- Location in Cluj County

- Location in Romania
- Coordinates: 46°40′22″N 23°27′19″E
- Country: Romania
- County: Cluj
- Subdivisions: Finișel, Hășdate, Lita, Liteni, Săvădisla, Stolna, Vălișoara, Vlaha

Government
  - Mayor (2024–2028): Stefan Asztalos (UDMR)
- Area: 52.11 km^{2} (20.12 sq mi)
- Elevation: 492 m (1,614 ft)
- Population (2021-12-01): 4,196
  - Density: 80.52/km^{2} (208.6/sq mi)
- Time zone: UTC+02:00 (EET)
  - Summer (DST): UTC+03:00 (EEST)
- Postal code: 407505
- Area code: +(40) 264
- Vehicle reg.: CJ
- Website: primariasavadisla.ro

Săvădisla (Hungarian: Tordaszentlászló) is a commune in Cluj County, Transylvania, Romania. It is composed of eight villages: Finișel (Kisfenes), Hășdate (Hasadát), Lita (Oláhléta), Liteni (Magyarléta), Săvădisla, Stolna (Isztolna), Vălișoara (Járarákos), and Vlaha (Magyarfenes; until 1889 Olahfenes).

The commune is located in the south-central part of Cluj County, 26 km (16 mi) southwest of the county seat, Cluj-Napoca.

== Demographics ==
Historical population
Year	Pop.	±%
1850	4,204	—
1880	4,878	+16.0%
1890	5,642	+15.7%
1900	6,230	+10.4%
1910	6,924	+11.1%
1920	7,055	+1.9%
1930	6,584	−6.7%
1941	6,445	−2.1%
1956	6,412	−0.5%
1966	5,845	−8.8%
1977	6,221	+6.4%
1992	4,777	−23.2%
2002	4,497	−5.9%
2011	4,392	−2.3%
2021	4,196	−4.5%
Source: Census data

At the 2011 census, the commune had 4,392 inhabitants; 51.6% were Hungarians, 44.4% Romanians, and 1.8% Roma. At the 2021 census, Săvădisla had a population of 4,196; of those, 49.21% were Hungarians, 42.97% Romanians, and 1.95% Roma.

== Archaeology ==
A necropolis has been discovered at Vlaha, being one of the very few Gepid sites in Transylvania.
