= Cuci, Mureș =

Cuci
- Commune
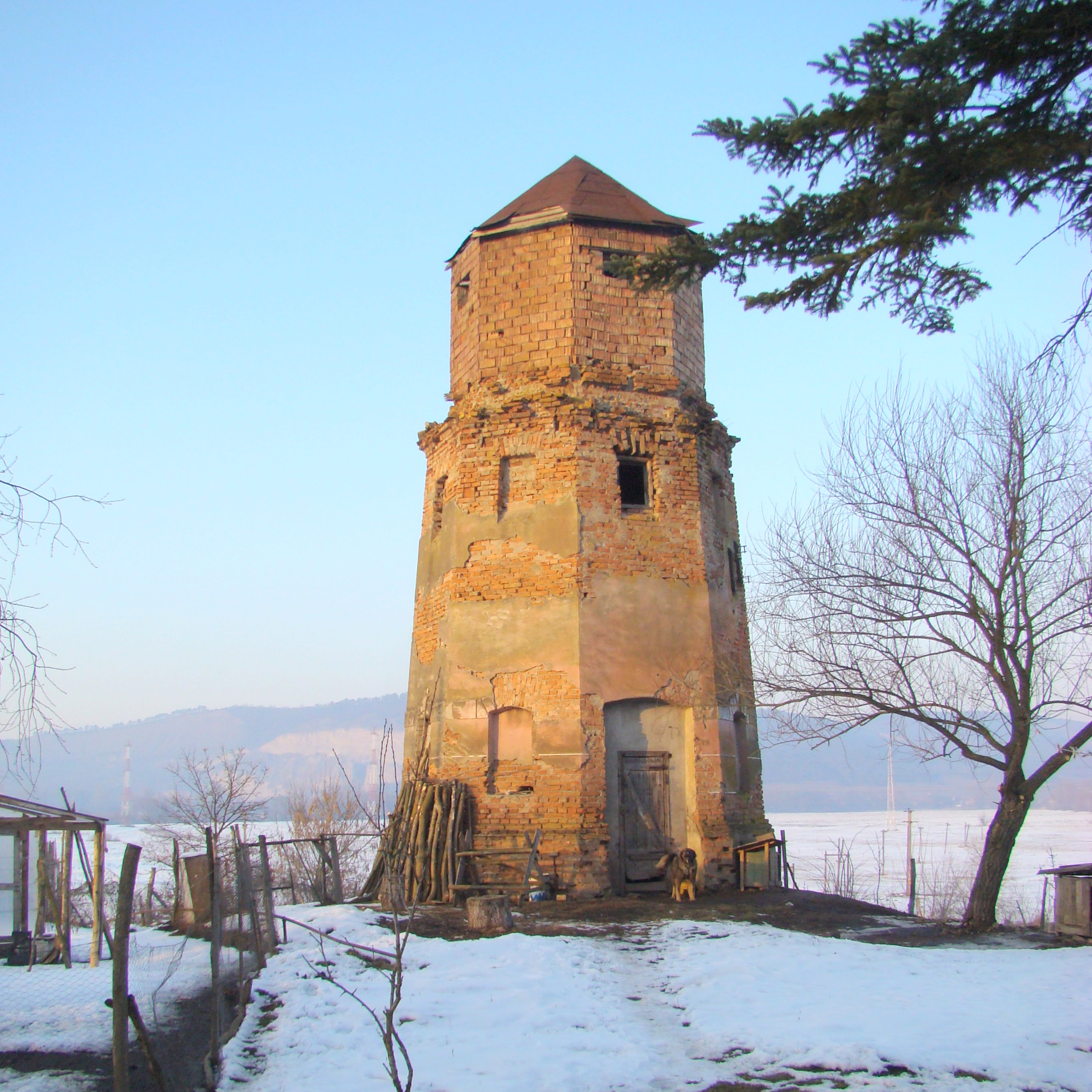
- Degenfeld Castle in Cuci

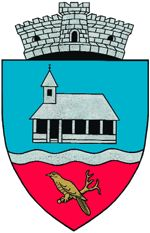
- Coat of arms

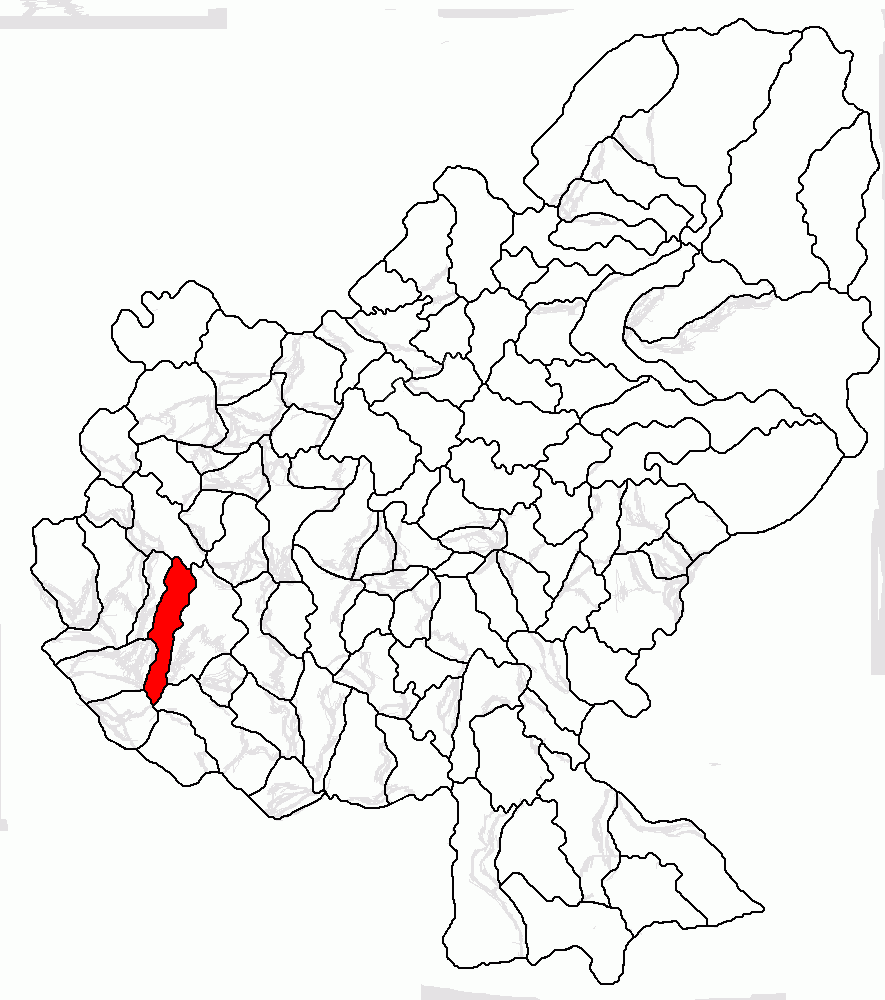
- Location in Mureș County

- Location in Romania
- Coordinates: 46.47°N 24.15°E
- Country: Romania
- County: Mureș

Government
  - Mayor (2020–2024): Ilie Șuta (PSD)
- Area: 42.11 km^{2} (16.26 sq mi)
- Elevation: 279 m (915 ft)
- Population (2021-12-01): 1,734
  - Density: 41.18/km^{2} (106.7/sq mi)
- Time zone: UTC+02:00 (EET)
  - Summer (DST): UTC+03:00 (EEST)
- Postal code: 547195
- Area code: +40 x59
- Vehicle reg.: MS
- Website: www.comunacuci.ro

Cuci (Hungarian: Kutyfalva, Hungarian pronunciation: [kucfɒlvɒ]) is a commune in Mureș County, Transylvania, Romania. It is composed of five villages: Cuci, Dătășeni (Marosdátos), După Deal (Hegymegett), Orosia (Marosoroszi), and Petrilaca (Oláhpéterlaka).

The commune lies on the Transylvanian Plateau, on the banks of the Mureș River. It is located the western part of the county, 9 km (5.6 mi) from the town of Luduș and 40 km (25 mi) from the county seat, Târgu Mureș.

== Demographics ==
According to the census from 2002 there were 2,200 people living in the commune; of this population, 78.77% were ethnic Romanians, 14.22% ethnic Hungarians, 6.90% ethnic Roma, and 0.09% Germans. At the 2021 census, Cuci had a population of 1,734; of those, 72,43% were Romanians, 12.75% Roma, and 10.21% Hungarians.

== See also ==
- List of Hungarian exonyms (Mureș County)
