= Bogata, Mureș =

Bogata Marosbogát
- Commune
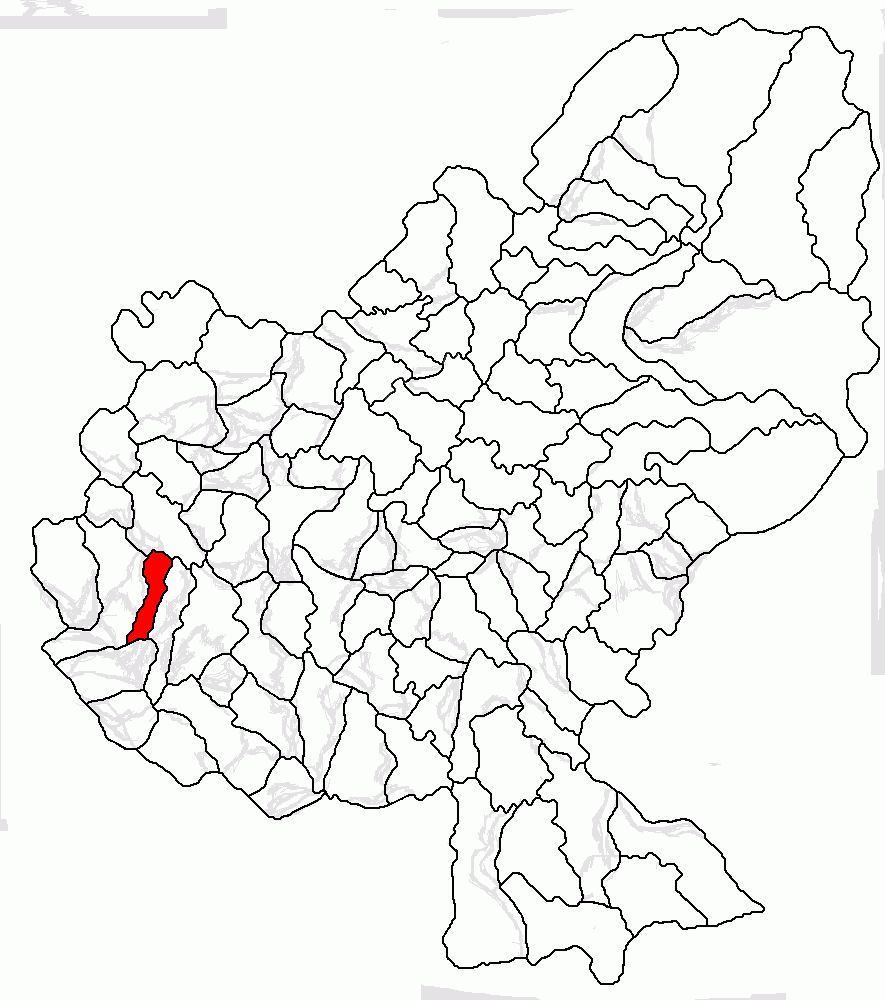
- Location in Mureș County

- Location in Romania
- Coordinates: 46°27′N 24°04′E
- Country: Romania
- County: Mureș
- Subdivisions: Bogata, Ranta

Government
  - Mayor (2020–2024): Doina Coc (Ind.)
- Area: 30.52 km^{2} (11.78 sq mi)
- Elevation: 283 m (928 ft)
- Population (2021-12-01): 1,845
  - Density: 60.45/km^{2} (156.6/sq mi)
- Time zone: UTC+02:00 (EET)
  - Summer (DST): UTC+03:00 (EEST)
- Postal code: 547125
- Area code: (+40) 02 65
- Vehicle reg.: MS
- Website: bogata.ro

Bogata (formerly Bogata de Mureș; Hungarian: Marosbogát; Hungarian pronunciation: [mɒroʃboɡaːt]) is a commune in Mureș County, Transylvania, Romania. It is composed of two villages, Bogata and Ranta (Ránta).

The settlement was first documented in 1295.

Historical population
Year	Pop.	±%
1850	1,813	—
1941	2,709	+49.4%
1992	1,862	−31.3%
2002	1,947	+4.6%
2011	2,018	+3.6%
2021	1,845	−8.6%
Source: Census data

== Natives ==
- Iuliu Moldovan (1882 – 1966), physician, academic, politician, and corresponding member of the Romanian Academy

== See also ==
- List of Hungarian exonyms (Mureș County)
