= Ciurila =

- Commune
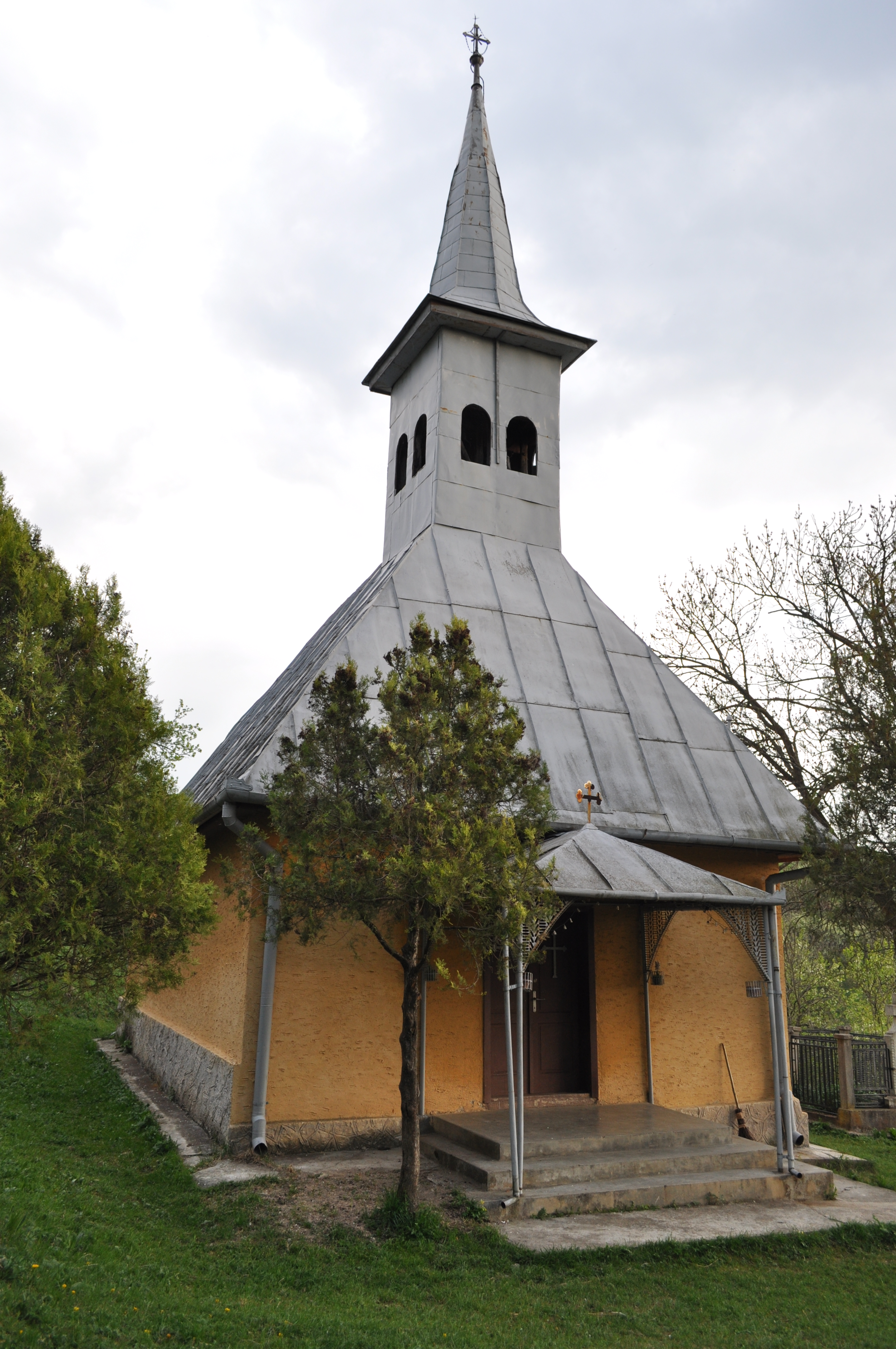
- Wooden church in Ciurila

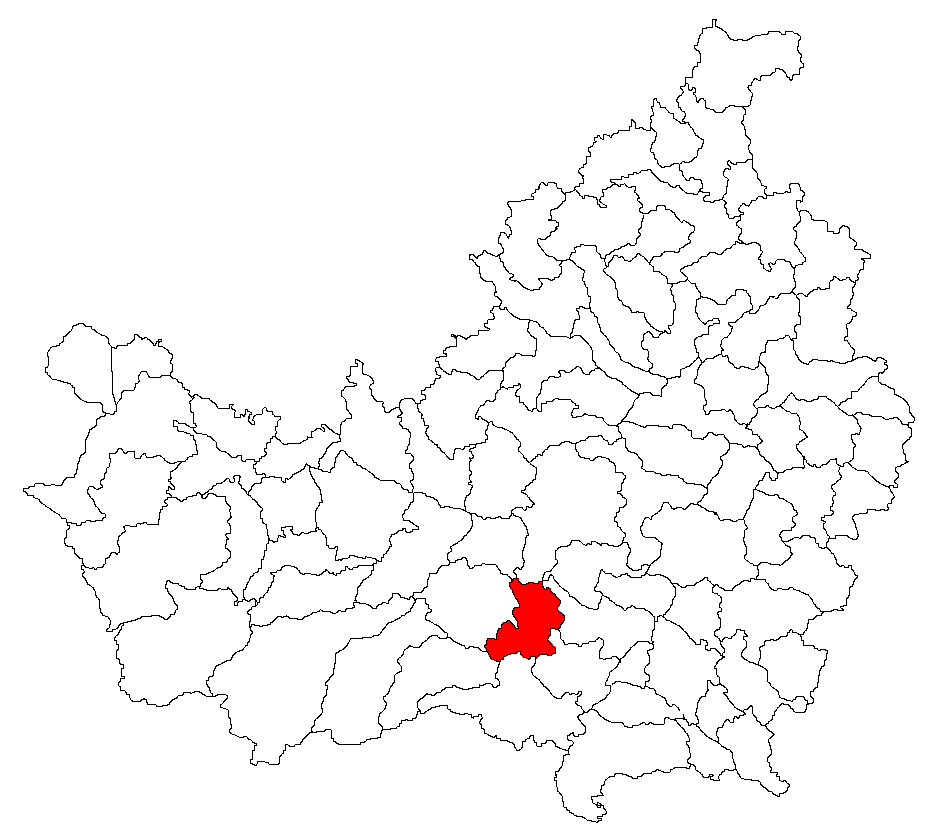
- Location in Cluj County

- Location in Romania
- Coordinates: 46°39′03″N 23°32′54″E
- Country: Romania
- County: Cluj
- Established: 1327
- Subdivisions: Ciurila, Filea de Jos, Filea de Sus, Pădureni, Pruniș, Sălicea, Săliște, Șutu

Government
  - Mayor (2020–2024): Teodor Cristinel Popa (PNL)
- Area: 72.22 km^{2} (27.88 sq mi)
- Elevation: 562 m (1,844 ft)
- Population (2021-12-01): 2,003
  - Density: 27.73/km^{2} (71.83/sq mi)
- Time zone: UTC+02:00 (EET)
  - Summer (DST): UTC+03:00 (EEST)
- Postal code: 407230
- Area code: +(40) x64
- Vehicle reg.: CJ
- Website: primariaciurila.ro

Ciurila (Hungarian: Csurulye; German: Schiril) is a commune in Cluj County, Transylvania, Romania. It is composed of eight villages: Ciurila, Filea de Jos (Alsófüle), Filea de Sus (Felsőfüle), Pădureni (Magyaróság), Pruniș (Magyarszilvás), Sălicea (Szelicse), Săliște (Tordaszeleste), and Șutu (Sütmeg).

Located in the south-central part of the county, the commune belongs to the Cluj-Napoca metropolitan area.

== Demographics ==
Historical population
Year	Pop.	±%
1850	2,583	—
1880	3,020	+16.9%
1890	3,131	+3.7%
1900	3,443	+10.0%
1910	3,831	+11.3%
1920	3,880	+1.3%
1930	4,171	+7.5%
1941	4,391	+5.3%
1956	4,155	−5.4%
1966	3,576	−13.9%
1977	2,869	−19.8%
1992	1,725	−39.9%
2002	1,509	−12.5%
2011	1,594	+5.6%
2021	2,003	+25.7%
Source: Census data

According to the census from 2002 there were 1,509 people living in this town; of this population, 97.21% were ethnic Romanians, 2.05% ethnic Roma, and 0.59% ethnic Hungarians. At the 2011 census, there were 1,594 inhabitants, of which 90.65% were Romanians, 3.45% Roma, and 1.19% Hungarians. At the 2021 census, Ciurila had a population of 2,003; of those, 77.08% were Romanians, 2.75% Roma, and 2.1% Hungarians.
