= Băla =

- Commune
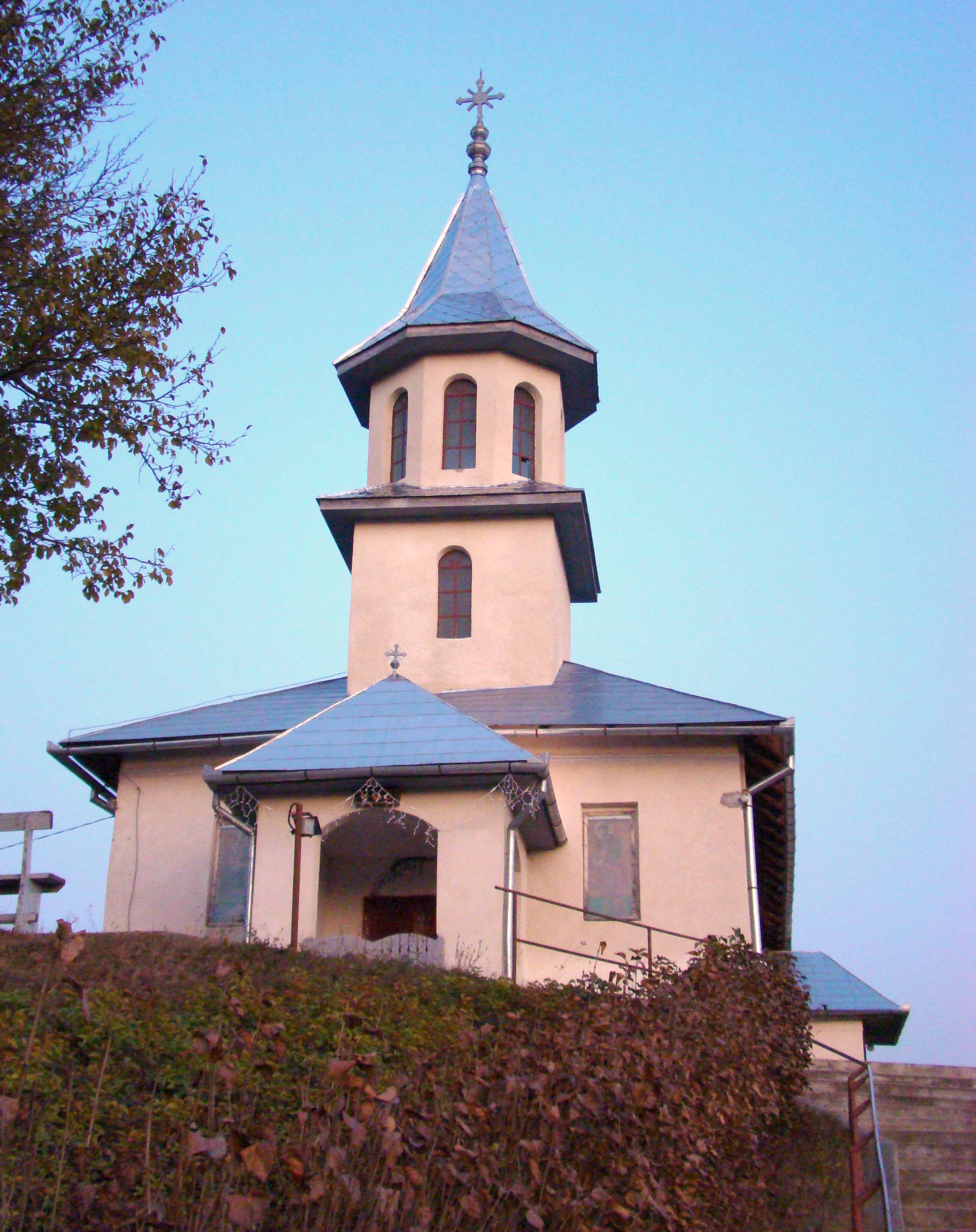

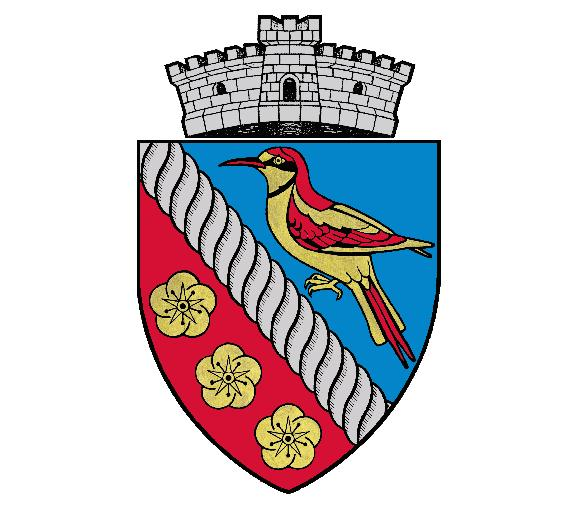
- Coat of arms

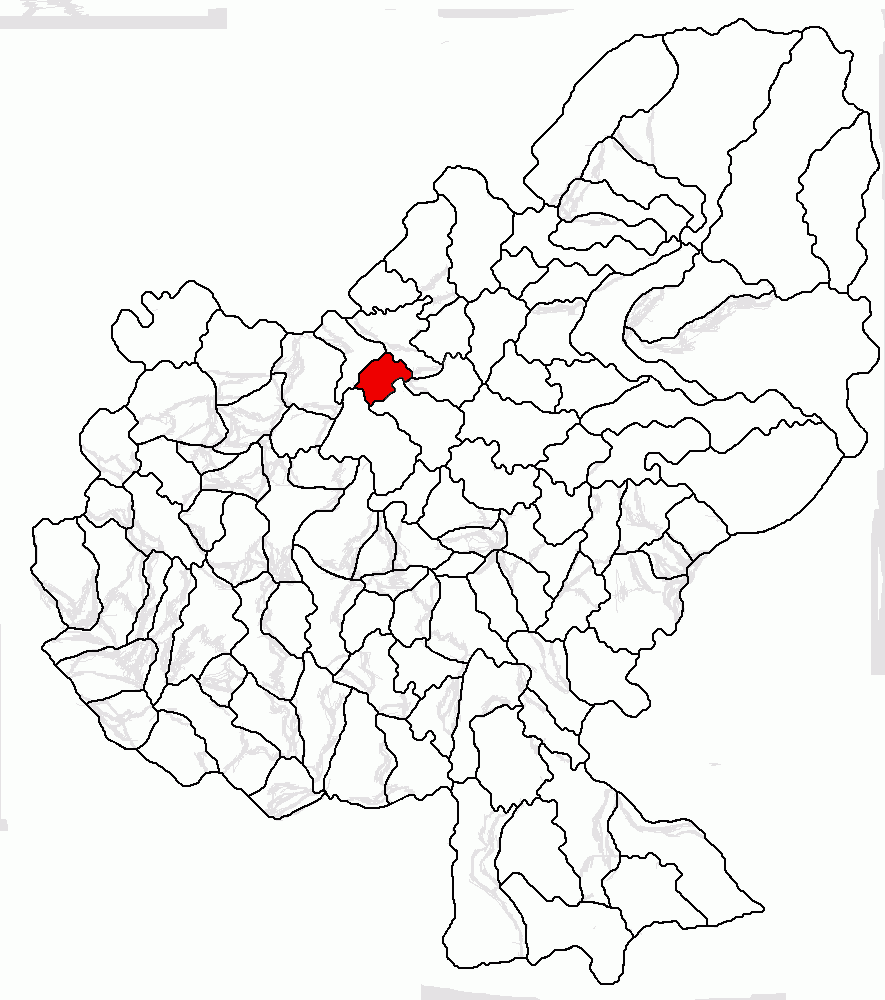
- Location in Mureș County

- Location in Romania
- Coordinates: 46.72°N 24.5°E
- Country: Romania
- County: Mureș

Government
  - Mayor (2024–2028): Ioan Huza (PNL)
- Area: 27.75 km^{2} (10.71 sq mi)
- Elevation: 401 m (1,316 ft)
- Population (2021-12-01): 618
  - Density: 22.3/km^{2} (57.7/sq mi)
- Time zone: UTC+02:00 (EET)
  - Summer (DST): UTC+03:00 (EEST)
- Postal code: 547095
- Area code: +(40) 265
- Vehicle reg.: MS
- Website: comunabala.ro

Băla (Hungarian: Bala; German: Bolla) is a commune in Mureș County, Transylvania, Romania. It is composed of two villages, Băla and Ercea (Nagyercse; Groß-Ertschen).

At the 2021 census, the commune had a population of 618; of those, 89.97% were Romanians, 3.88% Roma, and 2.43% Hungarians.

== See also ==
- List of Hungarian exonyms (Mureș County)
