= Cucerdea =

- Commune
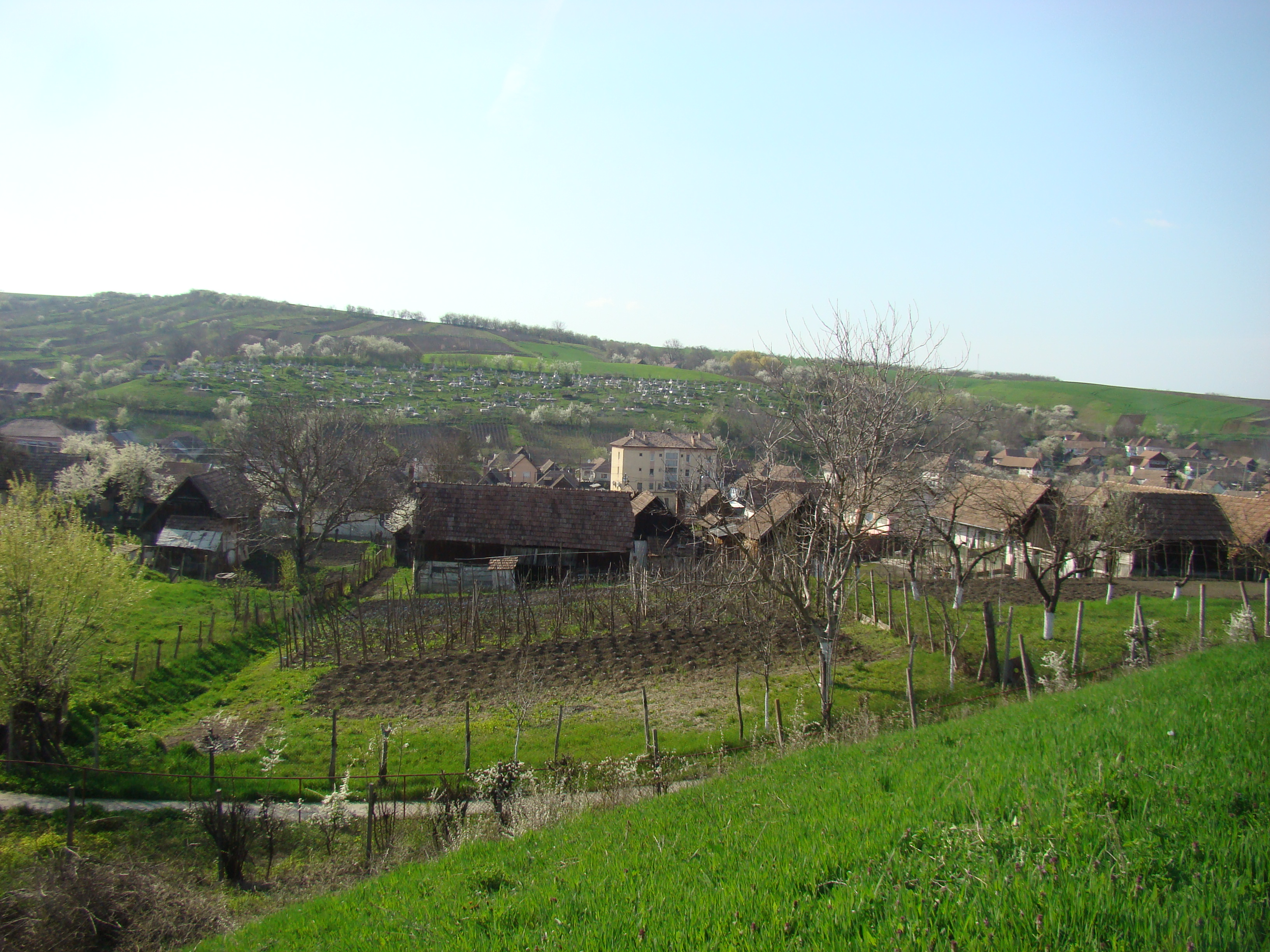
- View of Cucerdea

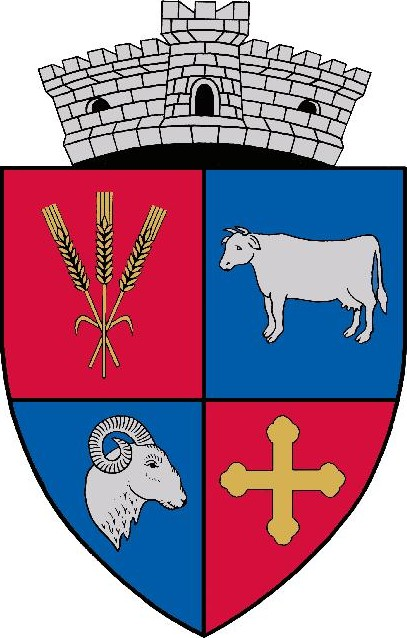
- Coat of arms

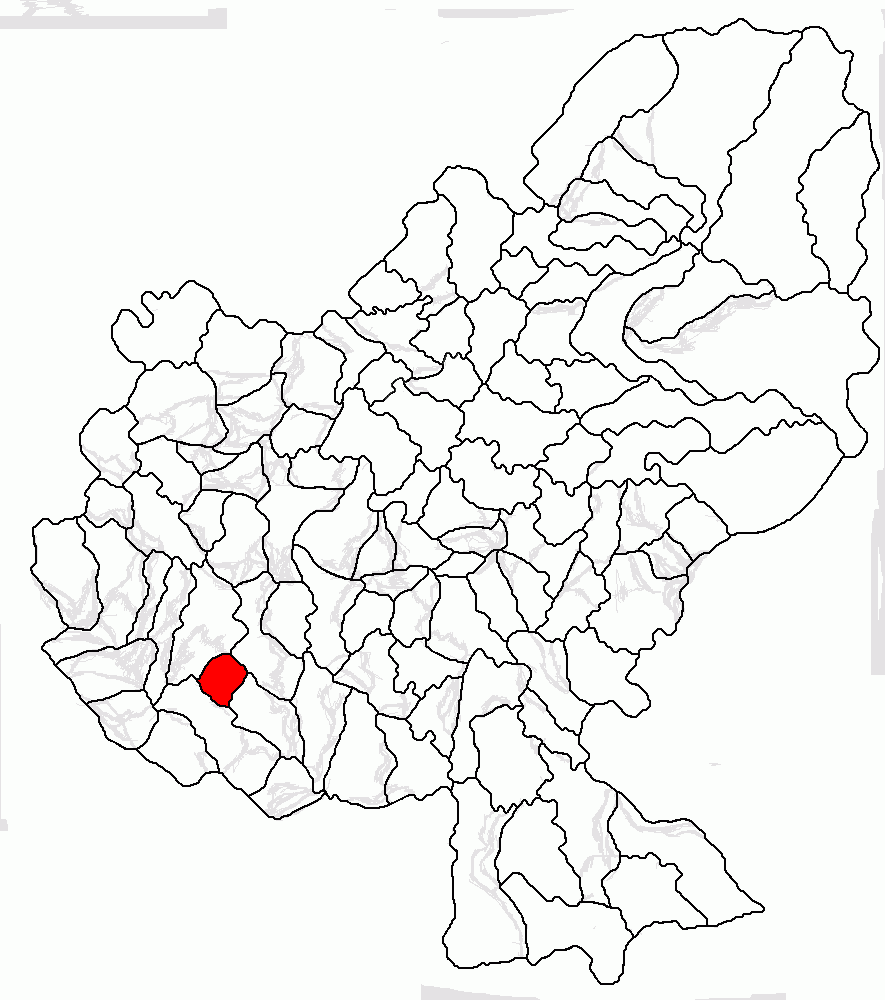
- Location in Mureș County

- Location in Romania
- Coordinates: 46°24′N 24°16′E
- Country: Romania
- County: Mureș

Government
  - Mayor (2020–2024): Vasile Morar (PNL)
- Area: 35.93 km^{2} (13.87 sq mi)
- Elevation: 314 m (1,030 ft)
- Population (2021-12-01): 1,293
  - Density: 35.99/km^{2} (93.20/sq mi)
- Time zone: UTC+02:00 (EET)
  - Summer (DST): UTC+03:00 (EEST)
- Postal code: 547190
- Area code: (+40) 02 65
- Vehicle reg.: MS
- Website: www.e-comune.ro/primaria-cucerdea-ms

Cucerdea (Hungarian: Oláhkocsárd, Hungarian pronunciation: [ˈolaːkotʃaːrd]) is a commune in Mureș County, Transylvania, Romania. It is composed of three villages: Bord (Bord), Cucerdea, and Șeulia de Mureș (Oláhsályi).

The commune is located in the southwestern part of the county, in the center of the Transylvanian Plateau, between the rivers Mureș and Târnava Mică.

Cucerdea is situated 10 km (6.2 mi) north of Târnăveni and 6 km (3.7 mi) south of Iernut, at a distance of 37 km (23 mi) from the county seat, Târgu Mureș.

Historical population
Year	Pop.	±%
2002	1,707	—
2011	1,525	−10.7%
2021	1,293	−15.2%
Source: Census data

According to the 2011 census, the commune has a population of 1,525, of which 97.18% were ethnic Romanians. At the 2021 census, Cucerdea has 1,293 inhabitants; 93.58% of them were Romanians.

== See also ==
- List of Hungarian exonyms (Mureș County)
