= Sânpaul, Mureș =

Sânpaul Kerelőszentpál
- Commune
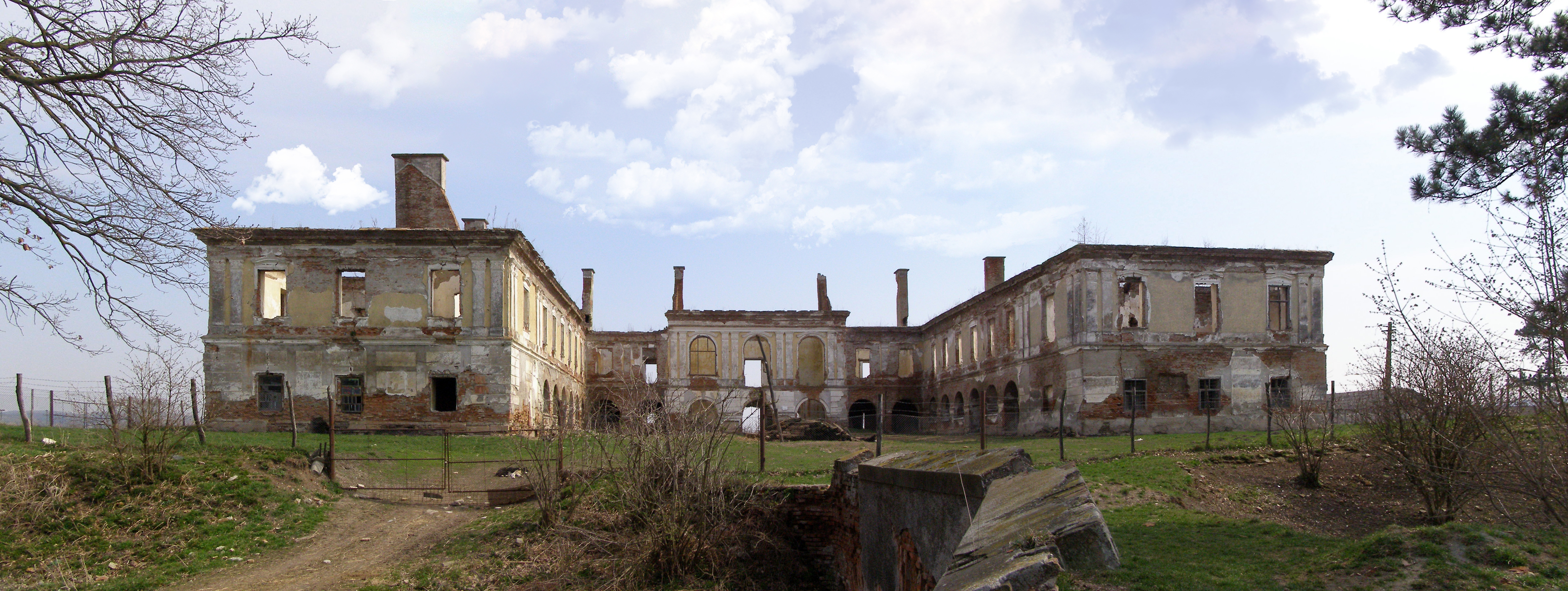
- Haller Castle in Sânpaul

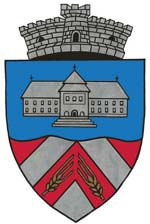
- Coat of arms

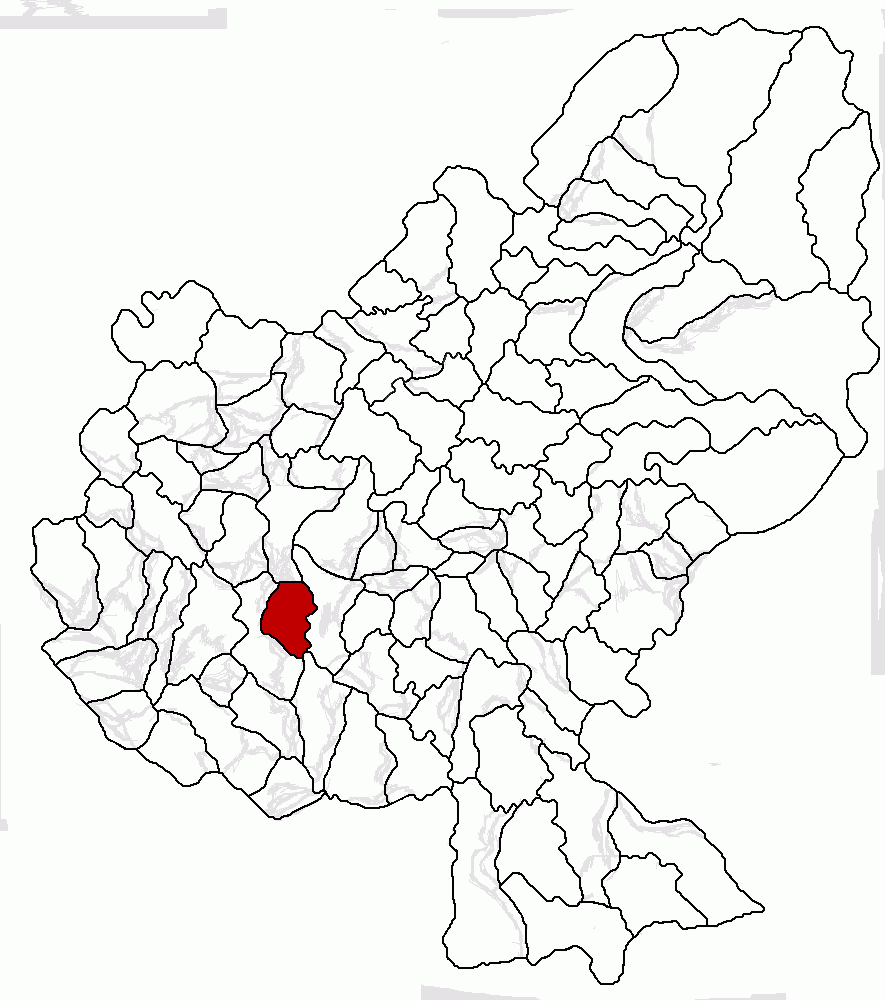
- Location in Mureș County

- Location in Romania
- Coordinates: 46.45°N 24.35°E
- Country: Romania
- County: Mureș

Government
  - Mayor (2020–2024): István Simon (UDMR)
- Area: 46.53 km^{2} (17.97 sq mi)
- Elevation: 290 m (950 ft)
- Population (2021-12-01): 4,320
  - Density: 92.8/km^{2} (240/sq mi)
- Time zone: UTC+02:00 (EET)
  - Summer (DST): UTC+03:00 (EEST)
- Postal code: 547550
- Area code: (+40) 02 65
- Vehicle reg.: MS
- Website: www.comunasinpaul.ro

Sânpaul (Hungarian: Kerelőszentpál, Hungarian pronunciation: [ˈkɛrɛløːsɛntpaːl]) is a commune in Mureș County, Transylvania, Romania. It is composed of five villages: Chirileu (Kerelő), Dileu Nou (Magyardellő), Sânmărghita (Mezőszentmargita), Sânpaul, and Valea Izvoarelor (until 1960 Beșineu; Búzásbesenyő).

At the 2021 census, the commune had a population of 4,320, of which 32.59% were Hungarians, 29.24% Roma, and 28.63% Romanians.

== Natives ==
- Franz Haller (1796–1875), Hungarian politician

== See also ==
- List of Hungarian exonyms (Mureș County)
