= Tăureni =

- Commune
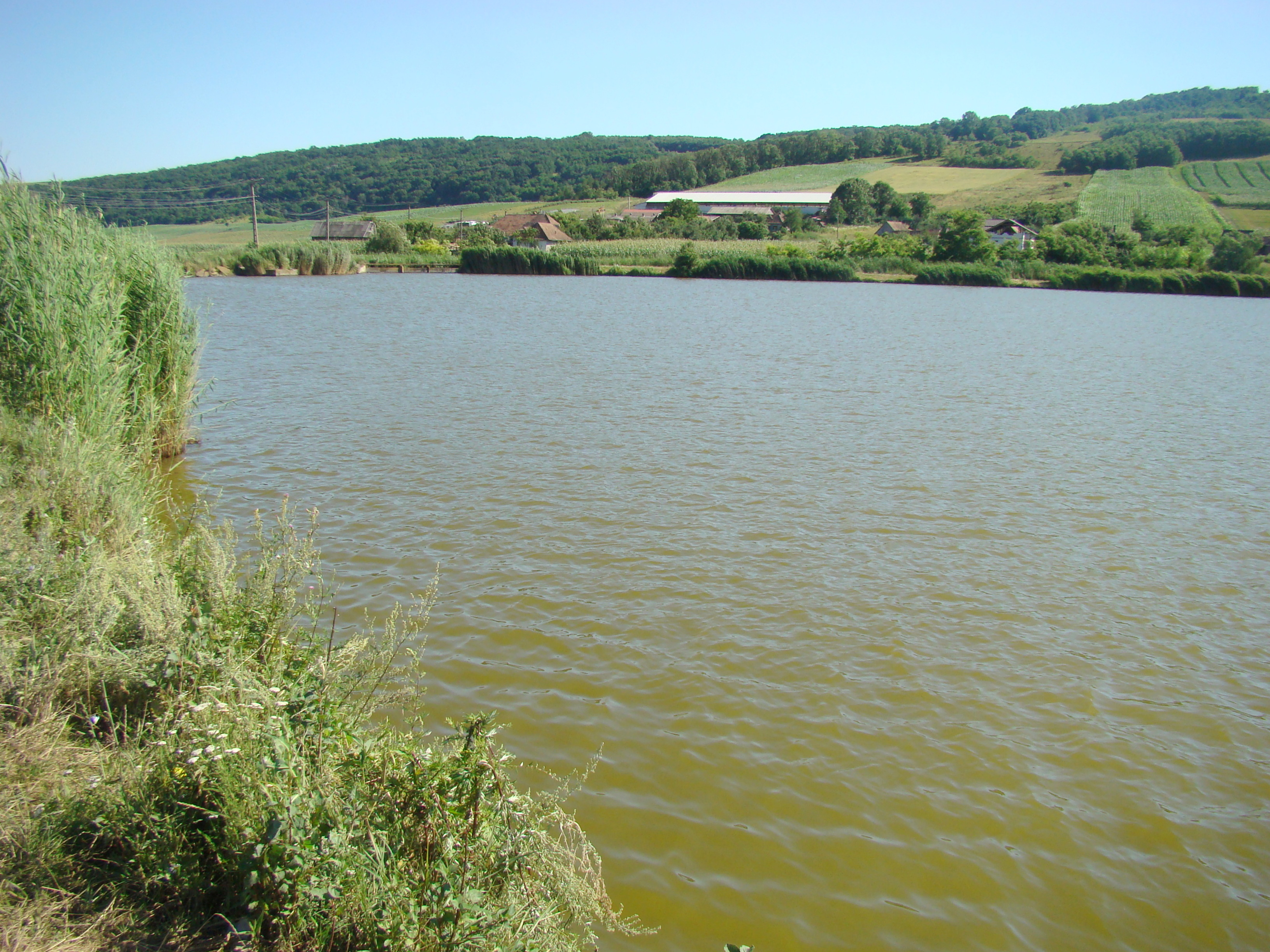
- Lake Tăureni

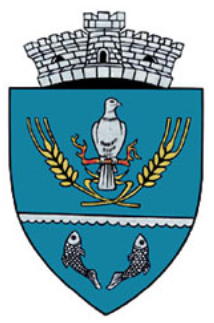
- Coat of arms

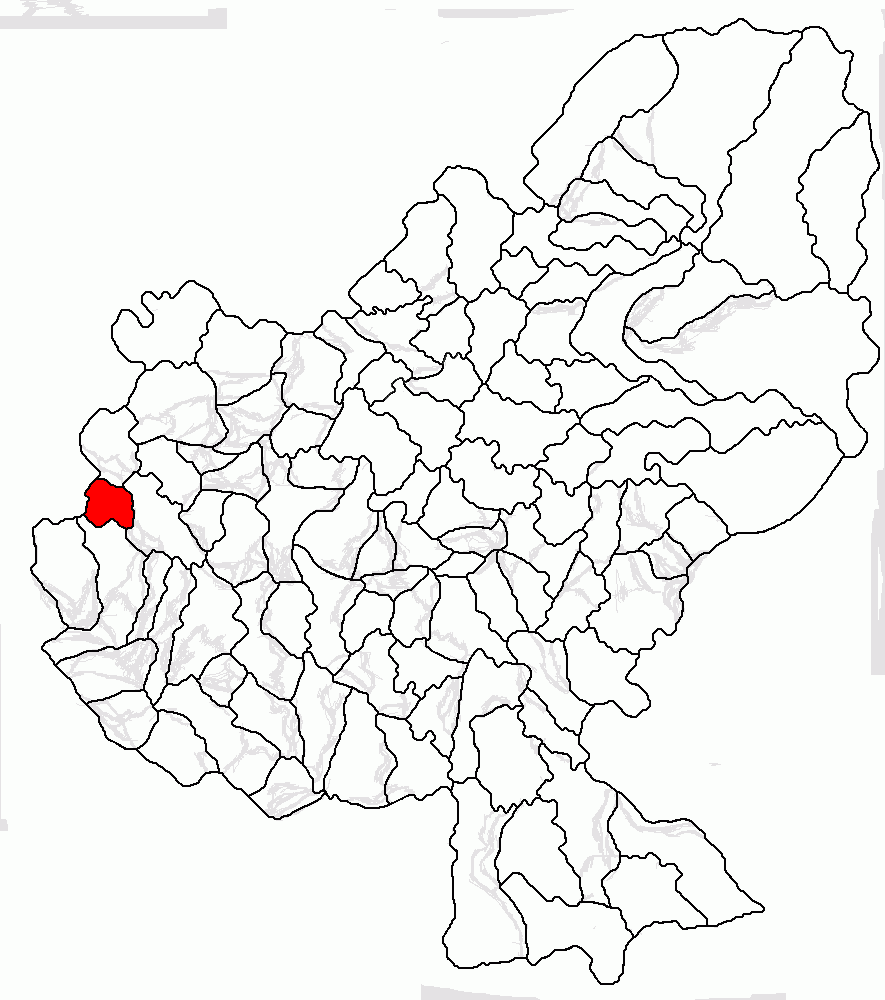
- Location in Mureș County

- Location in Romania
- Coordinates: 46°35′N 24°06′E
- Country: Romania
- County: Mureș

Government
  - Mayor (2024–2028): Ovidiu Petru Oltean (PSD)
- Area: 20.71 km^{2} (8.00 sq mi)
- Elevation: 299 m (981 ft)
- Population (2021-12-01): 919
  - Density: 44.4/km^{2} (115/sq mi)
- Time zone: UTC+02:00 (EET)
  - Summer (DST): UTC+03:00 (EEST)
- Postal code: 547600
- Area code: (+40) 0265
- Vehicle reg.: MS
- Website: primariataureni.ro

Tăureni (Hungarian: Mezőtóhát) is a commune in Mureș County, Transylvania, Romania that is composed of three villages: Fânațe (Kincstáribirtok), Moara de Jos (Csontostanya), and Tăureni.

At the 2002 census, the commune had a population of 1,049: 91% Romanians, 7% Roma, and 2% Hungarians. At the 2021 census, Tăureni had a population of 919; of those, 82.59% were Romanians and 13.6% Roma.
