= Luna, Cluj =

Luna
- Commune
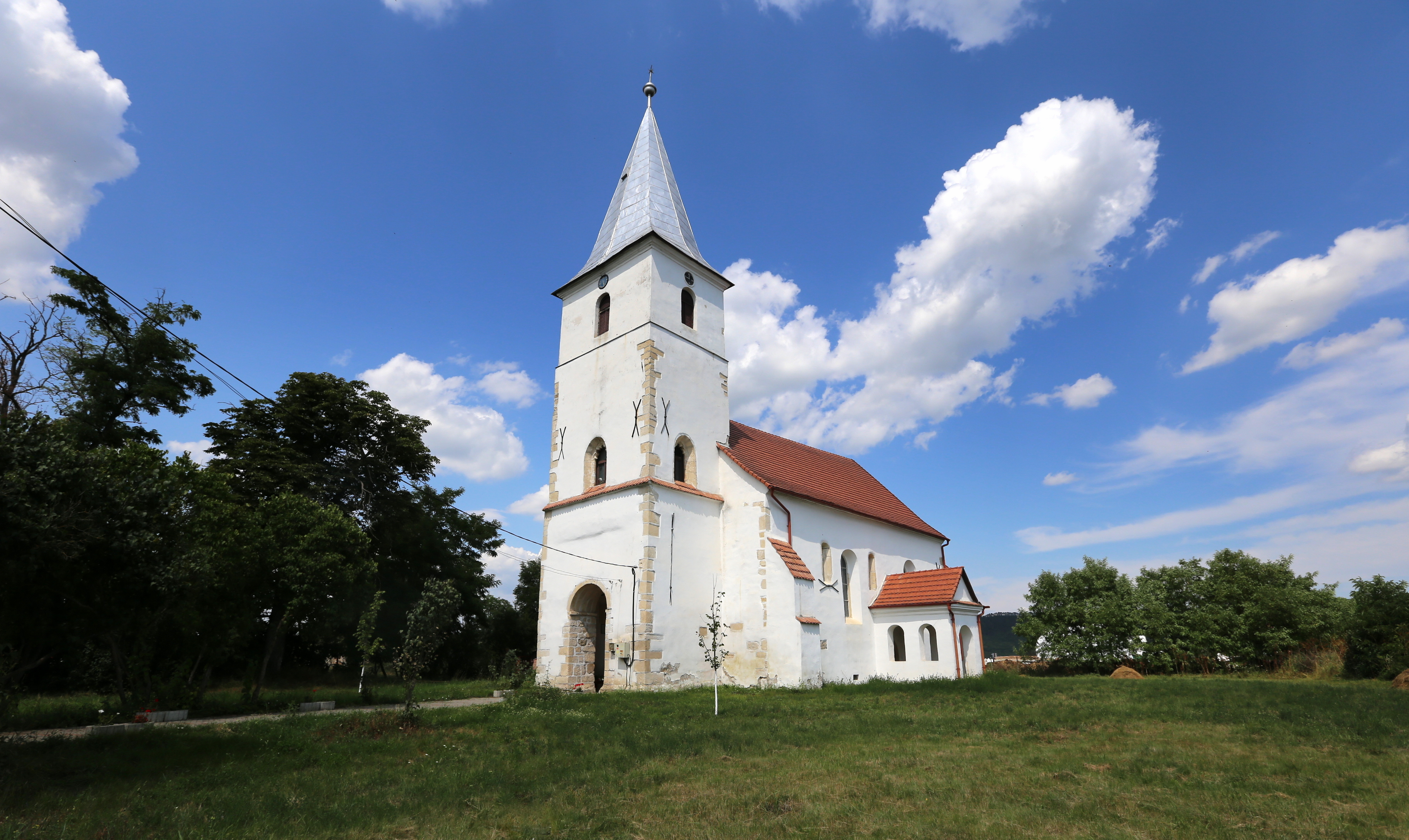
- Reformed church in Luncani

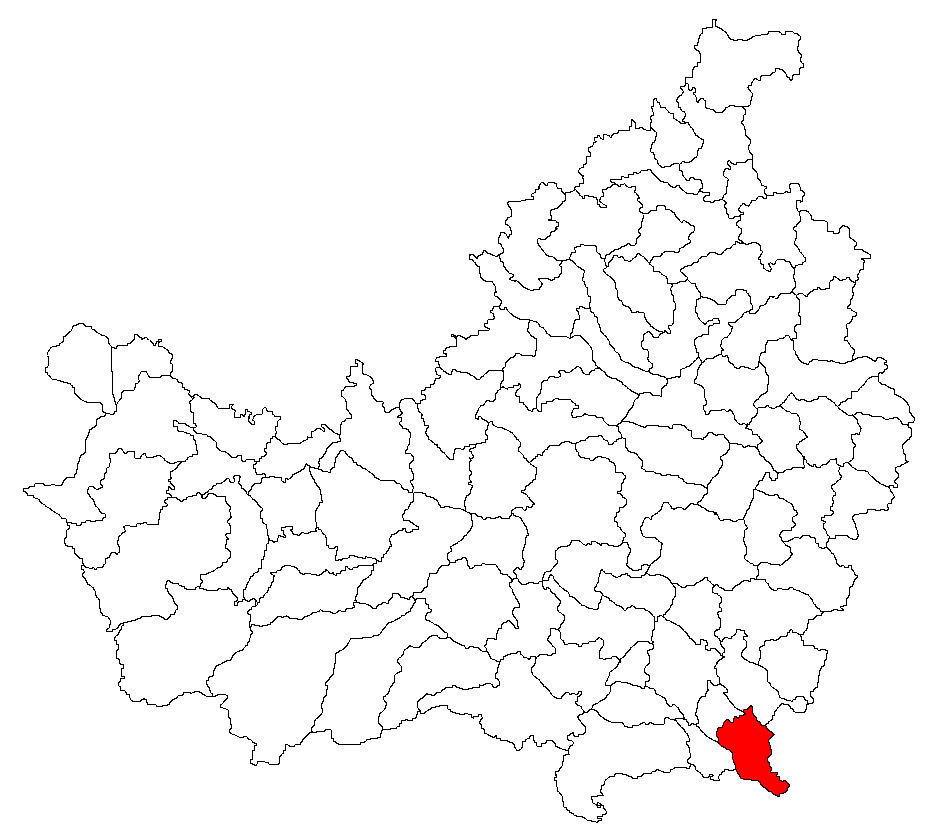
- Location in Cluj County

- Location in Romania
- Coordinates: 46°30′20″N 23°55′16″E
- Country: Romania
- County: Cluj
- Subdivisions: Gligorești, Luna, Luncani

Government
  - Mayor (2024–2028): Aurel Giurgiu (PNL)
- Area: 53.28 km^{2} (20.57 sq mi)
- Elevation: 300 m (980 ft)
- Population (2021-12-01): 4,750
  - Density: 89.2/km^{2} (231/sq mi)
- Time zone: UTC+02:00 (EET)
  - Summer (DST): UTC+03:00 (EEST)
- Postal code: 407360
- Area code: (+40) 0264
- Vehicle reg.: CJ
- Website: primarialuna.ro

Luna is a commune in Cluj County, Transylvania, Romania. It is composed of three villages: Gligorești (formerly Sămărtinu Sărat; Hungarian: Sószentmárton), Luna (Aranyoslóna; German: Lone), and Luncani (Aranyosgerend, German: Neusatz).

== Demographics ==
According to a census taken in 2002, the commune had a population of 4,450, of which 86.17% were ethnic Romanians, 10.24% ethnic Hungarians, and 3.48% ethnic Roma. Luna and Gligorești had a Romanian majority, while previously Grindeni (Hungarian: Aranyosgerend or Gerend), had a population of 1,454, of which Hungarians represented the majority. At the 2021 census, Luna had a population of 4,750; of those, 86.42% were Romanians and 6.21% Hungarians.
