= Valea Largă =

- Commune
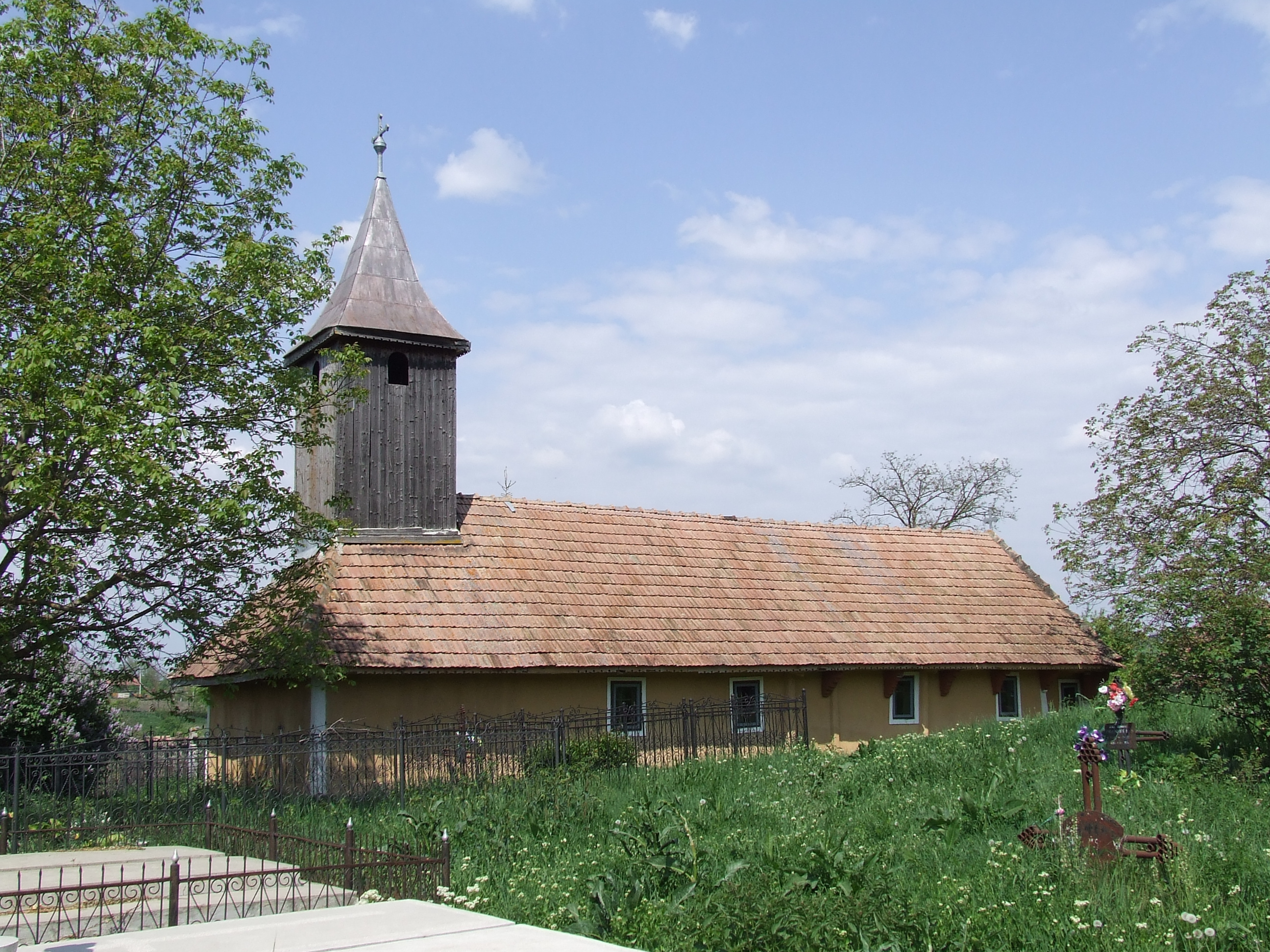
- Wooden church in Valea Largă

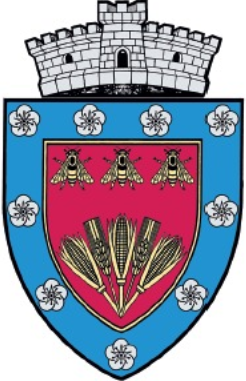
- Coat of arms

- Location in Mureș County

- Location in Romania
- Coordinates: 46.62°N 24.07°E
- Country: Romania
- County: Mureș

Government
  - Mayor (2024–2028): Beniamin Pădurean (PNL)
- Area: 33.50 km^{2} (12.93 sq mi)
- Elevation: 307 m (1,007 ft)
- Population (2021-12-01): 2,834
  - Density: 84.60/km^{2} (219.1/sq mi)
- Time zone: UTC+02:00 (EET)
  - Summer (DST): UTC+03:00 (EEST)
- Postal code: 547615
- Area code: (+40) 0265
- Vehicle reg.: MS
- Website: comunavalealarga.ro

Valea Largă (formerly Țicud; Hungarian: Mezőceked, Hungarian pronunciation: [ˈmɛzøːtsɛkɛd]) is a commune in Mureș County, Transylvania, Romania that is composed of nine villages: Grădini, Mălăești, Poduri, Valea Frăției (Frátaipatak), Valea Glodului, Valea Largă, Valea Pădurii, Valea Șurii, and Valea Urieșului (Uries).

At the 2002 census, the commune had a population of 3,379: 98% Romanians, 1.5% Roma, and 0.5% others. At the 2021 census, Valea Largă had a population of 2,834; of those, 93.61% were Romanians, 3.95% Roma, and 2.12% others.

== See also ==
- List of Hungarian exonyms (Mureș County)
