= Miheșu de Câmpie =

- Commune
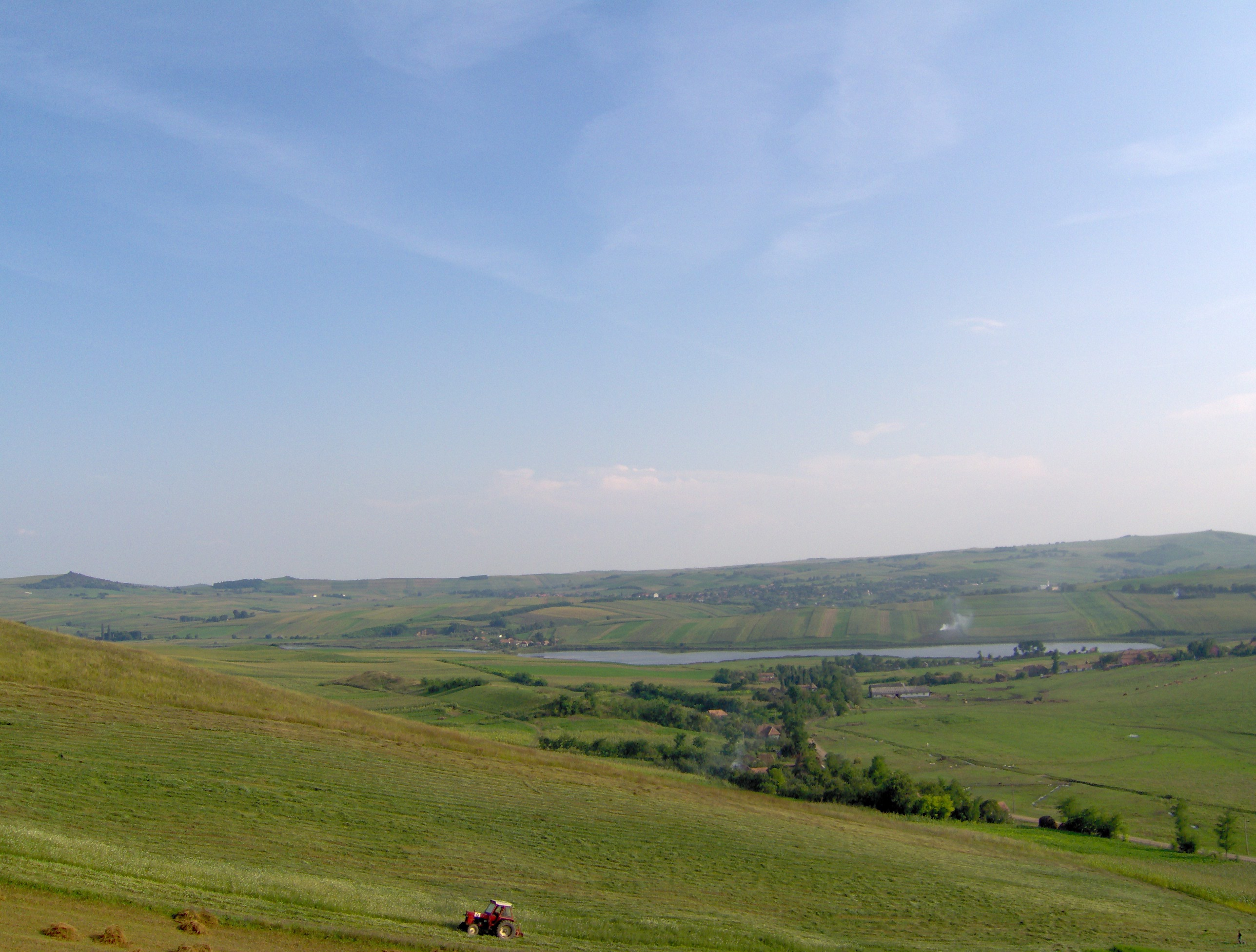
- Șăulița

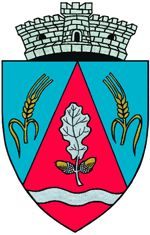
- Coat of arms

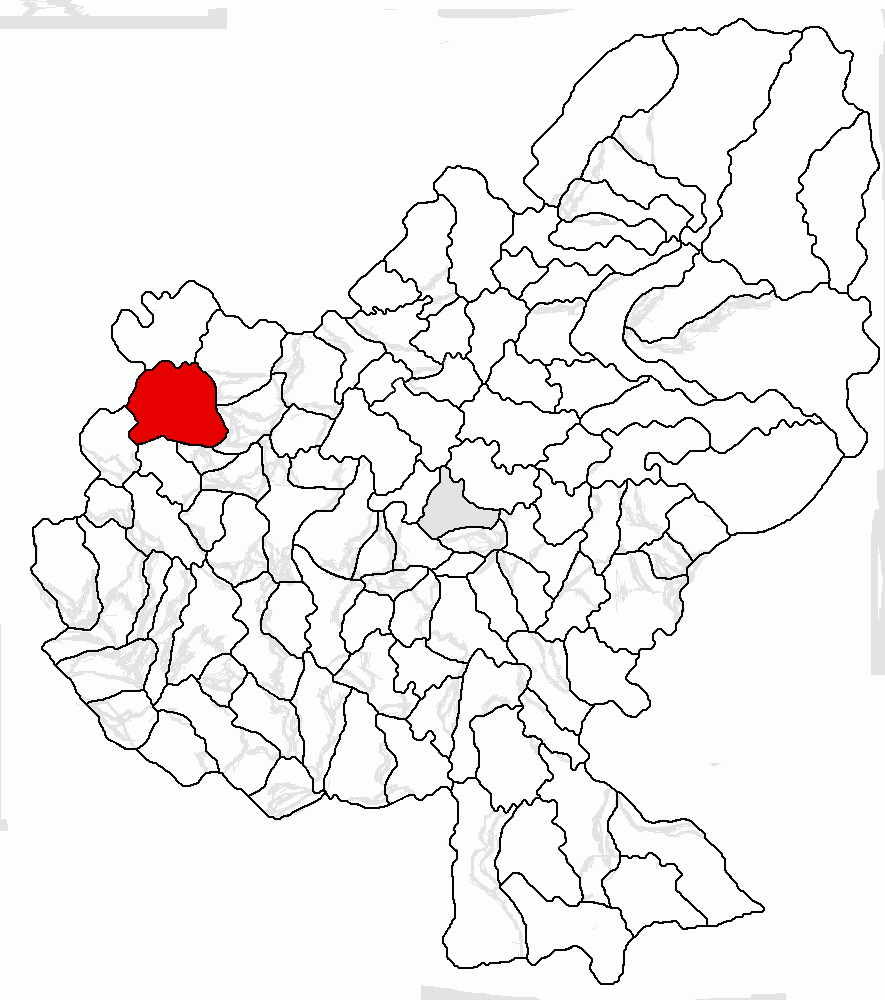
- Location in Mureș County

- Location in Romania
- Coordinates: 46.68°N 24.15°E
- Country: Romania
- County: Mureș

Government
  - Mayor (2024–2028): Emil Casoni (PNL)
- Area: 54 km^{2} (21 sq mi)
- Elevation: 355 m (1,165 ft)
- Population (2021-12-01): 2,140
  - Density: 40/km^{2} (100/sq mi)
- Time zone: UTC+02:00 (EET)
  - Summer (DST): UTC+03:00 (EEST)
- Postal code: 547420
- Area code: (+40) 0265
- Vehicle reg.: MS
- Website: mihesudecimpie.ro

Miheșu de Câmpie (Hungarian: Mezőméhes, Hungarian pronunciation: [ˈmɛzøːmeːhɛʃ]; German: Bienendorf) is a commune in Mureș County, Transylvania, Romania. It is composed of eight villages: Bujor (Kendeffytanya), Cirhagău (Cserhágó), Groapa Rădăii (Laposdülőtanya), Miheșu de Câmpie, Mogoaia, Răzoare (Mezővelkér), Șăulița (Kissályi), and Ștefanca.

At the 2021 census, the commune had a population of 2,140; of those, 72.9% were Romanians, 13.55% Roma, and 5.19% Hungarians.

== See also ==
- List of Hungarian exonyms (Mureș County)
