= Celts in Transylvania =

Geographical aspect of Celts

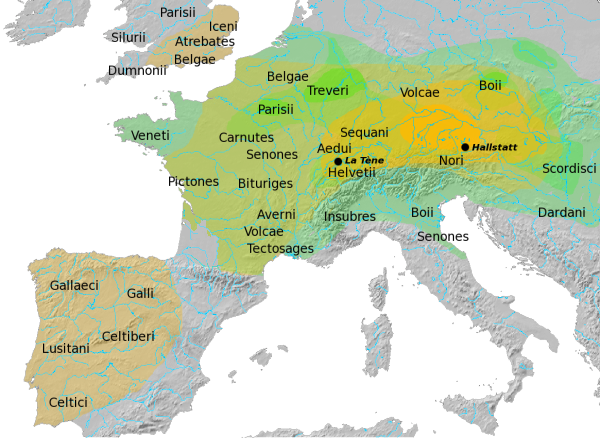
Overview of the Hallstatt and La Tène cultures. Core Hallstatt territory (HaC, 800 BCE). Eventual area of Hallstatt influence (by 500 BCE, HaD). Core territory of the La Tène culture (450 BCE). Eventual area of La Tène influence (by 250 BCE). The territories of some major Celtic tribes of the late La Tène period are labeled.

The appearance of Celts in Transylvania can be traced to the later La Tène period (c. 4th century BCE). Excavation of the great La Tène necropolis at Apahida, Cluj County, by Ștefan Kovács at the turn of the 20th century revealed the first evidence of Celtic culture in Romania. The 3rd–2nd century BCE site is remarkable for its cremation burials and chiefly wheel-made funeral vessels.

A historical timeline of the Celts of Transylvania can be derived from archaeological finds at La Tène, but there are almost no ancient records that allow reconstruction of political events in the area. The Celts exercised politico-military rule over Transylvania between the 4th and 2nd century BCE and brought with them a more advanced iron-working technology. They were also responsible for the spread of the potter's wheel into a much wider area than the one they occupied.

== History ==
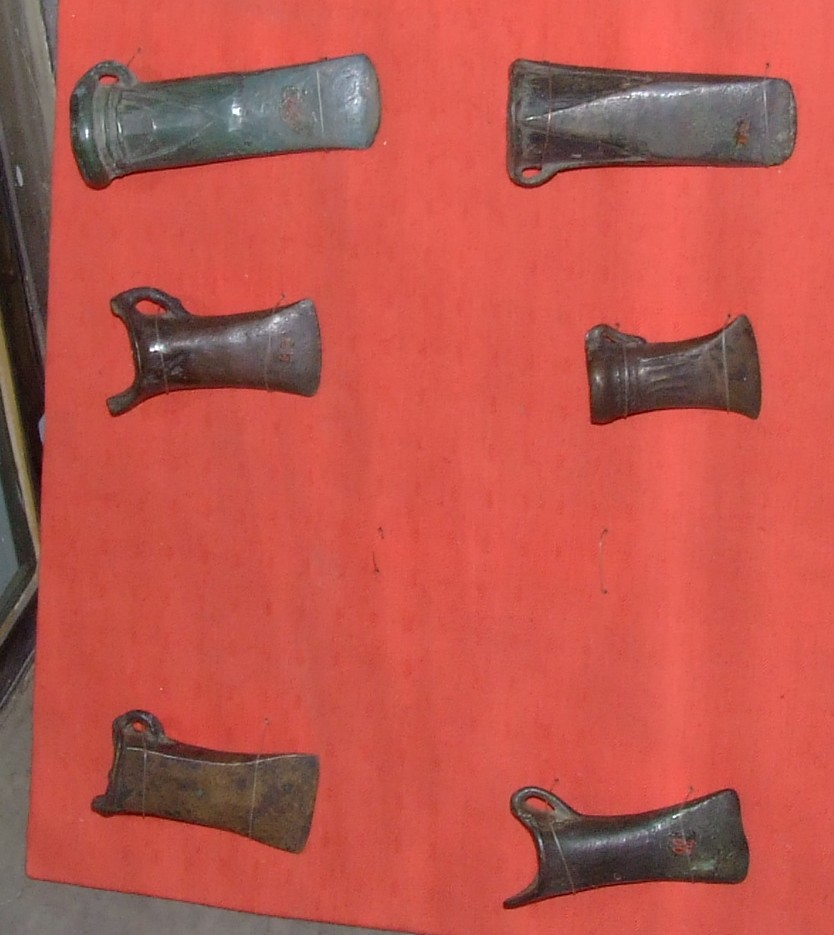
Celtic socketed axes and tools from the Bronze Age in Transylvania, Romania

Large areas of ancient Dacia, which were populated early in the First Iron Age by Thracian people, were affected by a massive migration of Iranian Scythians moving east to west during the first half of the first millennium BC. They were followed by a second equally large wave of Celts migrating west to east. Celts arrived in northwestern Transylvania in around 400–350 BC as part of their great migration eastwards. When Celtic warriors first penetrated these territories, the group seem to have merged with the domestic population of early Dacians and assimilated many Hallstatt cultural traditions.

=== 4th-3rd centuries BC ===
The second half of the 4th century BC saw the Middle La Tène Celtic culture emerge in north-western and central Dacia, a development reflected especially in burials of the period. Celtic artifacts dating to this time have been discovered at Turdaș, Hațeg and Mediaș in modern-day Romania. By 1976, the number of Celtic sites found in Transylvania had reached about 150, indicating a significant La Tène population surpassed only by the Dacians. These sites are mostly cemeteries. Archaeological investigations have highlighted several warrior graves with military equipment, suggesting that an elite Celtic military force penetrated the region.

Celtic vestiges are found concentrated in the Transylvanian plateau and plain, as well as the upper Someș basin, whereas the surrounding valleys of Hațeg, Hunedoara, Făgăraș, Bârsa, Sfântu Gheorghe, and Miercurea Ciuc have neither necropoleis nor settlements but only tombs or isolated items. This indicates that Celts occupied the territory between the Mureș and Someș rivers, west of the Apuseni Mountains, and the plains and plateau in the intra-Carpathian space along with the valley in the upper basin of Someș. Nevertheless, these valleys, as well as those of Banat and Maramureș, have also yielded contemporary Dacian findings.

Of the Celtic cemeteries excavated, the most important are those in Ciumești and Pișcolt (Satu Mare County) and Fântânele (Bistrița-Năsăud County). These contain over 150 graves compared to the average of 50–70. Necropoleis have also been found at Sanislău (Satu Mare County), Curtuișeni (Bihor County), Galații Bistriței (Bistrița-Năsăud County), and Brașov (Brașov County).

- Twenty-three of the oldest graves from the extensive Fântânele, Mureș cemetery in Mureș County have been dated to the beginning of the 4th century BC. Among European Celtic cemeteries, this one is second only to Munsingen in size. The Geto-Dacian population is also represented through a full range of contemporary native pottery types.
- Finds from Pișcolt reveal that the inhabitants of settlements in the area practiced inhumation, or reuse of a pre-existing barrow or grave, as a type of burial.
- At Ciumești cemetery, of the 34 graves excavated, 21 were simple cremations in pits, seven featured inhumations, while the remains of six cremations had been buried in urns. The number and type of finds in the graves differed in each case. Principal among the grave-goods was an iron warrior's helmet of eastern Celtic type as well as a socketed spear, a pair of Hellenistic greaves and a suit of chain mail, to which a small bronze disc had been attached as its central feature with S-shaped motifs arranged in a series of symmetrical panels around its edge. The cremation burial containing the chain mail has been dated to the 3rd century BC (La Tène B2b–C1, more likely C1).

In Transylvania, the Celts shifted from inhumation to cremation, either through natural progression or because of Dacian influence. Almost without exception, the necropoleis so far studied are bi-ritual, although cremation appears to be more prevalent than inhumation. The Celts in Dacia certainly cremated their dead from the second La Tène period onwards but Celtic inhumations appear no older than pit-grave cremations in any of the cemeteries. It is impossible to say whether the Celts turned away from the practice of cremation as the Scythians had. Although less frequent, inhumation still occurred as a constant practice even during the final stage of Celtic inhabitation of this territory.

Celtic settlements had a rural character with such sites found in Mediaș, Morești (Mureș County), and Ciumești.

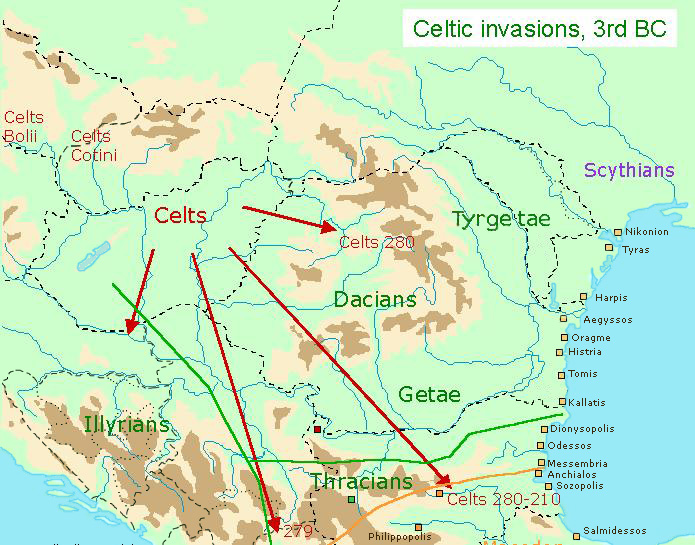
Movements of the Celts in Transylvania in 3rd century

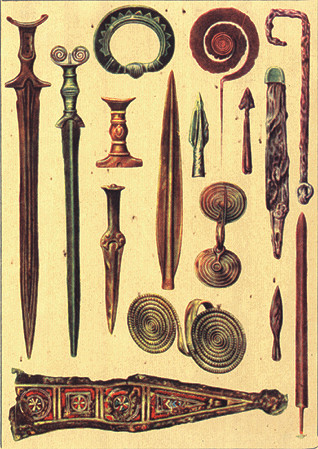
Bronze Age and Iron Age artefacts from Romania

Expansion of Celtic groups in the area may be related to their invasion of the Balkans around 335 BC, when a massive colonization of the Tisa plain and the Transylvanian Plateau occurred following the death of Lysimachus. However, the eastward movement of the Celts into Transylvania used a different route from the one taken by the hordes that attacked the Balkans.

Celts did not occupy all intra-Carpathian areas of Transylvania, stopping short of the Maramureș Depression for instance, where excavations have uncovered Dacian fortifications from the 4th and 3rd centuries BC. As regards Celtic influence on local Daco-Getic culture, Vasile Pârvan has stated that the latter is wholly indebted to Celtic traditions and that the "La Tene-ization" of these northern Tracians was a cultural phenomenon primarily due to the Celtic population who settled the area.

=== 3rd – 2nd century BC ===
Archaeological sites of the 3rd and 2nd centuries BC reveal a pattern of co-existence and fusion between the bearers of La Tène culture and the indigenous Dacians. Domestic dwellings exhibit a mixture of Celtic and Dacian pottery while several Celtic graves contain Dacian type vessels. At Celtic sites in Dacia, finds show that the native population imitated Celtic art forms that they admired, but remained firmly and fundamentally Dacian in their culture.

Dacian archaeological finds in the Transylvania area increase in number from the middle of the 2nd century BC.

=== 2nd–1st century BC ===
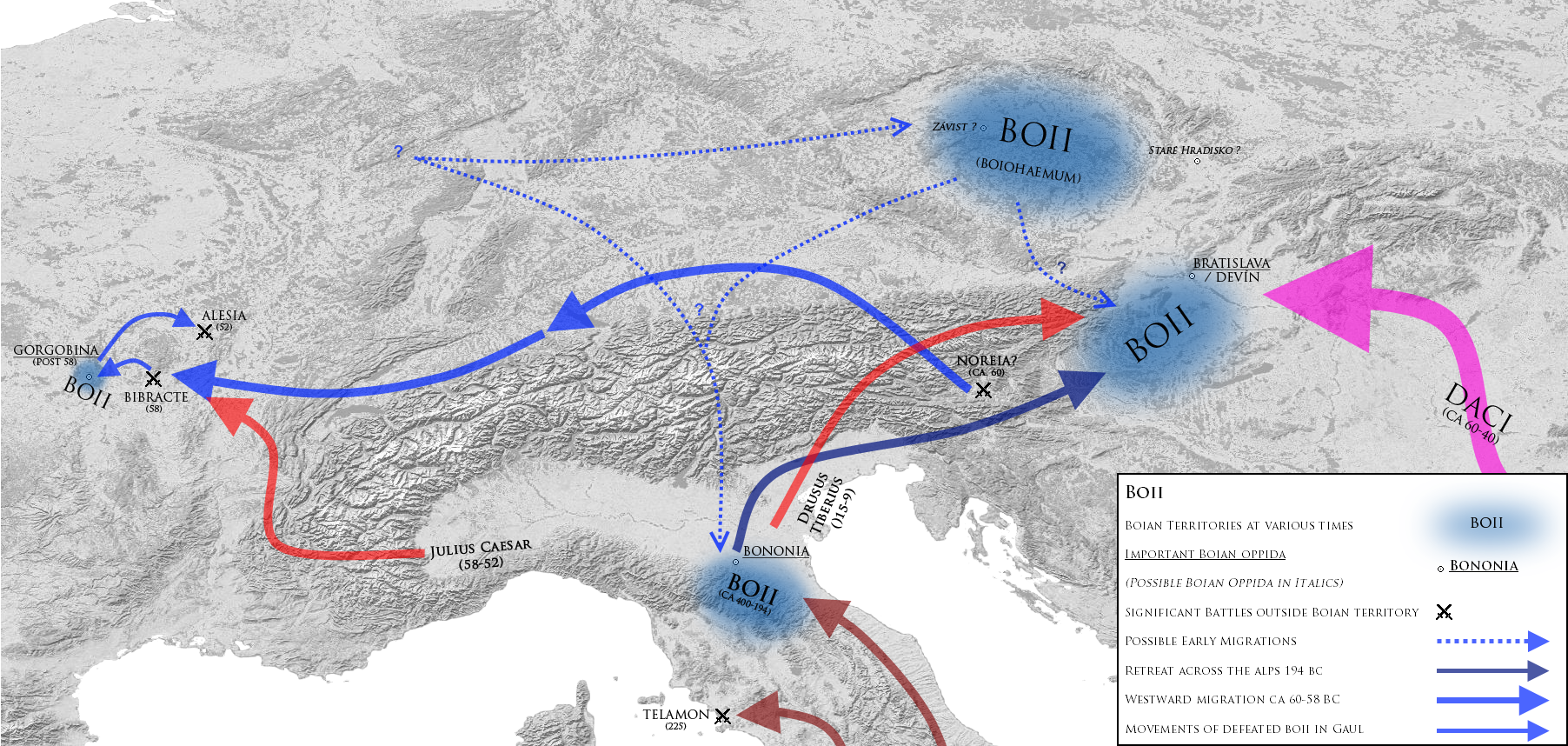
Migratory movements of the Celtic Boii

During the first half of the 2nd century BC, Pompeius Trogus writes in his Historiae Philippicae of a Dacian king, Oroles, who fought against Celtic incursions. Oroles is recorded as resisting the intrusion of the Bastarnae, a people now generally considered to be of Germanic origin but who were in fact Celto-Germanic and, according to Livy, spoke a Celtic language. The Bastarnae moved from Silesia into what is now central and northern Moldavia.

Pompeius Trogus along with Justin also record the rise in Dacian authority prior to 168 BC under the leadership of King Rubobostes.

Around 150 BC, La Tène material disappears from the area. This is concurrent with ancient writings, which mention the rise of Dacian authority. This ended Celtic domination and it is possible that the Celts were forced out of Dacia. Conversely, modern scholars have posited that the Transylvanian Celtic-speakers remained but merged with the local culture and thereafter ceased to be distinctive.

The boundary between the Celts and Dacians near the River Tisa is depicted in 2nd century BC pottery found at Pecica in Arad County, a prosperous trading center at the confluence of the two peoples.

=== 1st century BC ===
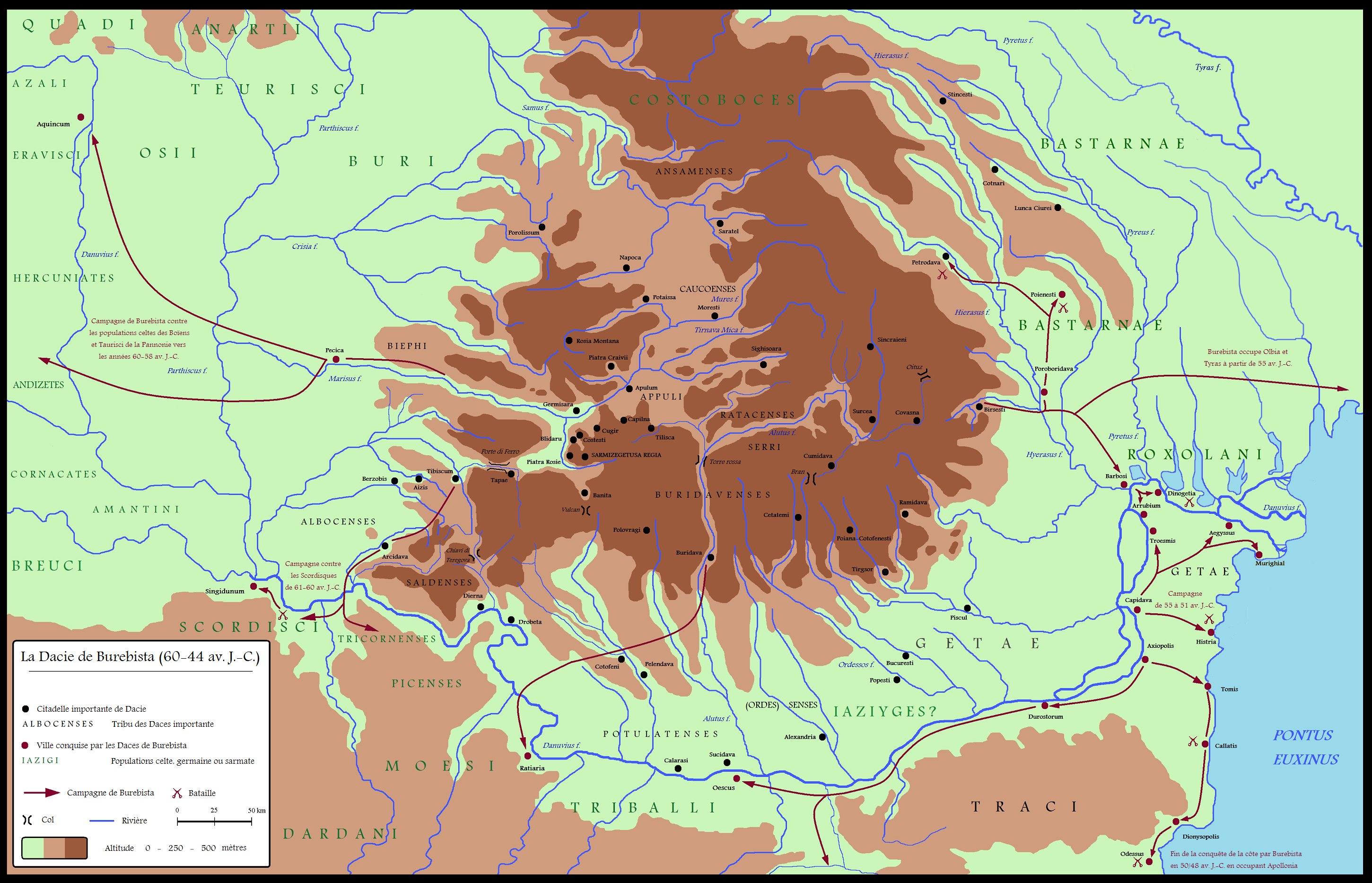
Map of Dacia during Burebista's time (60-44 BC) including the campaigns against Celtic Boii and Teurisci

A classic period of Geto-Dacian La Tène culture began in the 1st century BC centered around the city of Sarmizegetusa Regia in south-western Transylvania. Dacian king Burebista defeated the Celtic Boii and Taurisci tribes between 60–59 BC. However, some archaeological finds in Dacian settlements and fortifications feature imported Celtic vessels and others made by Dacian potters imitating Celtic prototypes. These discoveries in sites from regions north and west of Transylvania show that relations between the Dacians and the Celts continued in the period 1st century BC-1st century AD.

During Burebista's time, the Dacians became closer to the remaining Celtic populations than they had been when the Celts ruled Transylvania. Evidence from the earlier period shows Celtic burials and settlements with only occasional Dacian elements, while Dacian settlements with Celtic finds are infrequent. This situation reversed after Burebista's conquest when a distinctive hybrid Celtic-Dacian culture emerged on the Hungarian plain and in the Slovak regions.

Most of the Celts were absorbed into the Geto-Dacian population and contributed to Dacian cultural development. These Celtic tribes, who were skilled in iron exploitation and processing, also introduced the potter's wheel to the area, thereby contributing to acceleration of the development of Dacia. By this time, prosperous Celtic communities had spread over the whole territory of modern Romania.

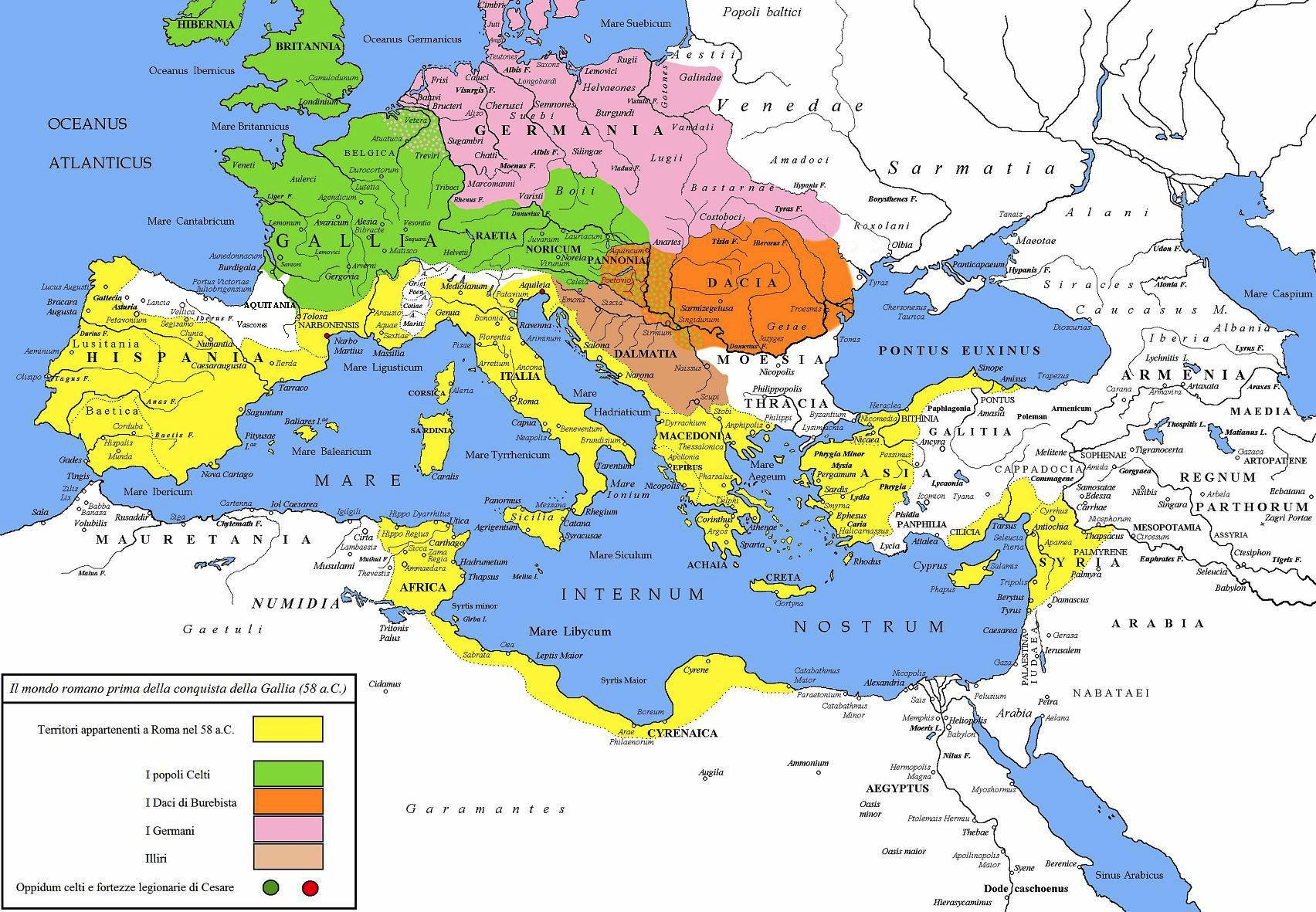
Dacian (orange) and Celtic tribes (green) in the Roman Republic and its neighbours in 58 BC

=== 2nd century AD ===
By the 2nd century, Celtic military and civilian groups from Roman Empire provinces had moved into the area of Transylvania that also had become part of the Empire, as part of Roman Dacia, by 106 AD. They were probably Latin-speaking groups with Celtic substratum who also participated in the Roman military campaigns in Dacia.

Roman Dacia consisted of eastern and southeastern Transylvania, the Banat and Oltenia regions of modern Romania but excluded the rest of Dacia. The presence of Celts here is mainly illustrated by the composition of both the legions and cohorts. Legio XIII Gemina came from the Celtic zone of Vindabona and contained some Celtic elements. Troops from Roman Celtic and Germanic provinces were the most numerous of the auxiliary troops. (See also List of Roman auxiliary regiments)

The several cohorts and alae Gallorum attested in diplomas and inscriptions reveal the large number of Gauls who were recruited by Romans, some of whom were moved to Transylvania (i.e. Cohors II Gallorum Dacica equitata in Dacia Superior later organized as Dacia Porolissensis). Some units were recruited from single Gallic or Germanic tribes (i.e. Germanic Batavi formed Cohors III Batavorum "3rd Cohort of Batavi").

The following are military units with some Celtic-speaking elements stationed in this region:

- Legio XIII Gemina located at Apulum the Latin name of the Dacian settlement Apulon, (Alba Iulia).
- Cohors I Alpinorum equitata: When stationed in Dacia Superior, they were garrisoned at Sărăţeni, Mureş. After 144 AD they were moved to Călugăreni
- Military detachments I Vindelicorum c.R. eq: Formed by the Celtic Vindelici, it is attested at Cumidava on the site of modern Rasnov, by an inscription "Vindelicorum Cumidavensis Alexandriana". Other detachments of I Vindelicorum c.R. eq were located at Tibiscum.
- Alpinorum and cohors VIII Raetorum are recorded in Dacia superior in diploma from 136/38 having been attested in Dacia in 114 and 110 AD.
- Cohors II Gallorum Dacica equitata, Dacia Superior. A number of stamps of Ala Gallorum were found at Borosneul Mare Covasna.
- Cohors V Lingonum (Celtic Lingones): They were located at Moigrad-Porolissum.

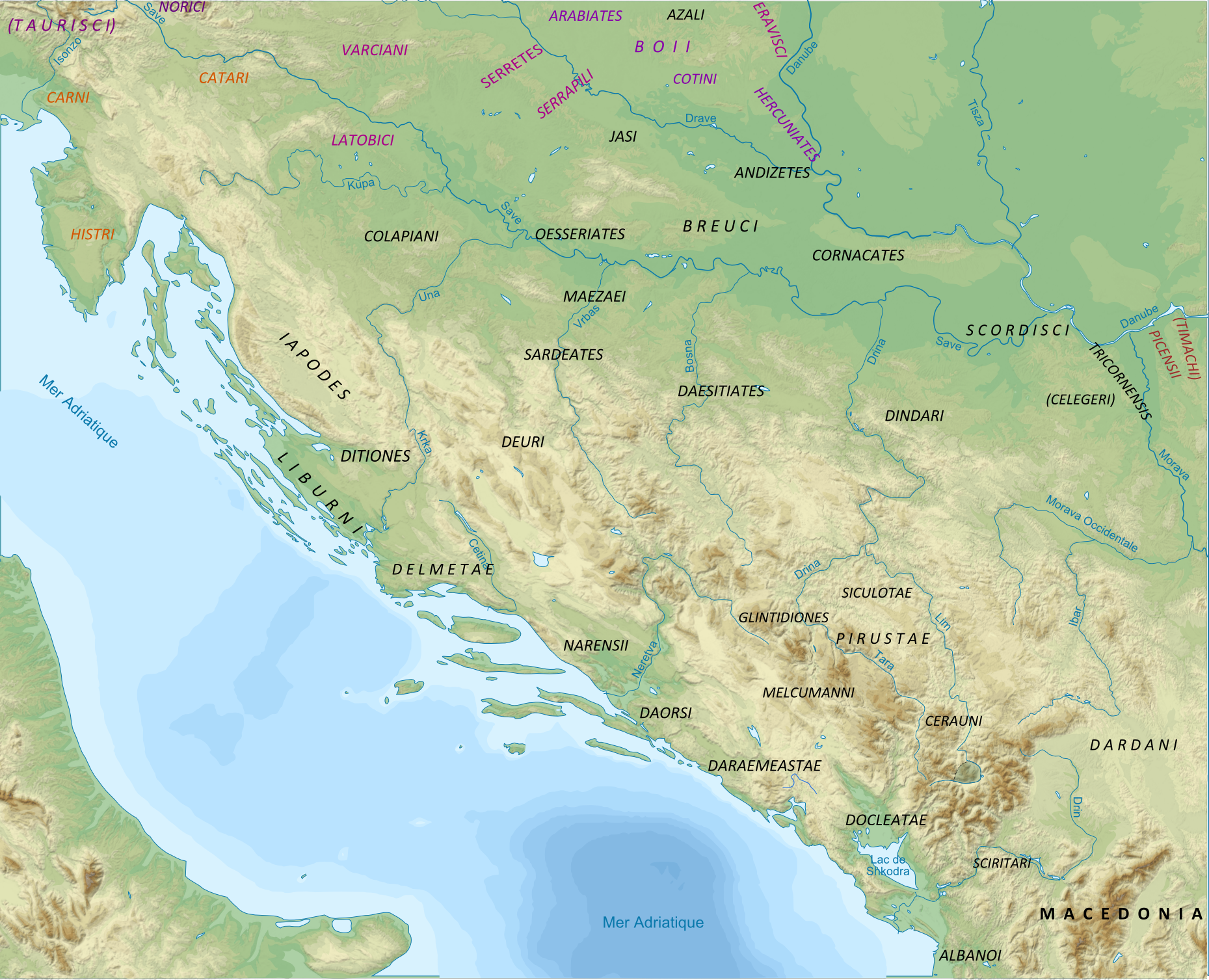
Celts in Illyria, Pannonia, including parts of Dacia (modern Transylvania)

== Celtic tribes in Transylvania ==
In the vicinity of 2nd century BC Transylvania, the Celtic Boii settled in the northern area of Dunántúl, in modern-day southern Slovakia and in the northern region of Hungary around the centre of modern-day Bratislava. Boii tribal union members the Taurisci and the Anarti lived in northern Dacia with the core of the Anarti tribe found in the area of the Upper Tisa. The Anartophracti from modern southeast Poland are considered part of the Anarti. Scordiscan Celts dwelling southeast of the Iron Gates of the Danube may be considered a part of the Transylvanian Celtic culture. A group of Britogauls also moved into the area.

Celts penetrated first into western Dacia, then as far as north-west and central Transylvania. A large number of archaeological finds indicate a sizeable Celtic population settling for a long period among the natives. The archaeological evidence shows that these Eastern Celts were absorbed into the Geto-Dacian population.

A geographic reference by Ptolemy from the 2nd century AD indicates that the Anarti were settled on the northwestern edge of Dacia with the Teurisci bordering them on the east, and further east there were the Costoboci.

== Celtic art in Transylvania ==
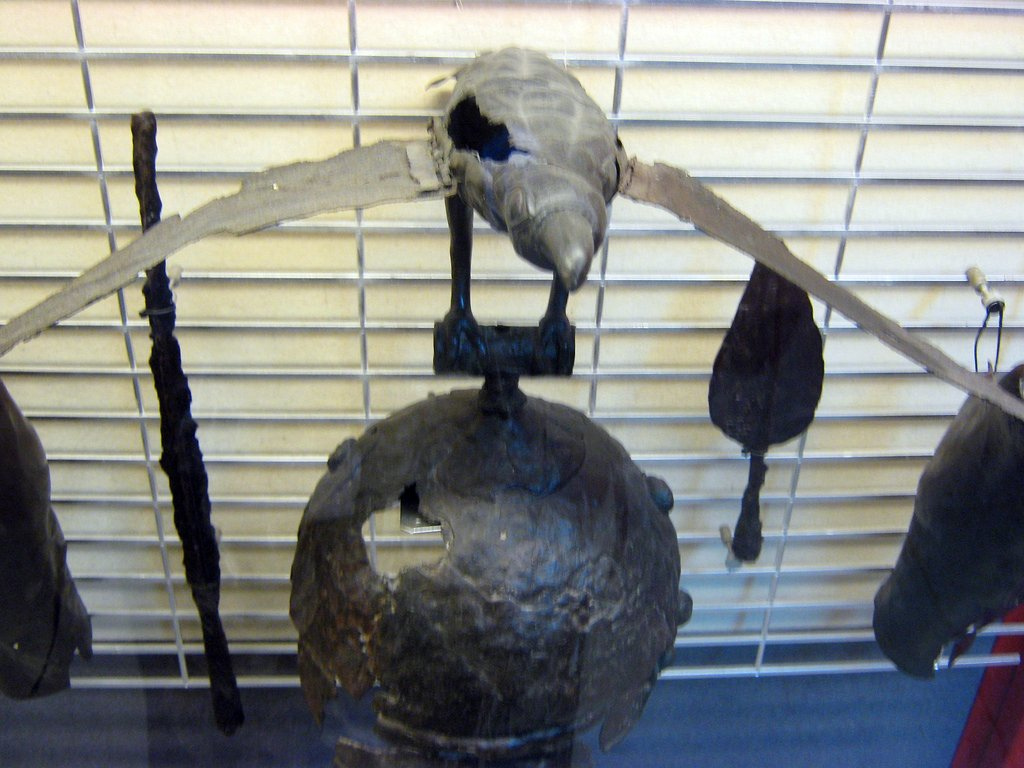
The Celtic Helmet from Ciumești, near Satu Mare, Romania (northern Dacia), an Iron Age raven totem helmet, dated around the 4th century BC. A similar helmet is depicted on the Gundestrup cauldron, being worn by one of the mounted warriors (detail tagged here:). See also an illustration of Brennos wearing a similar helmet.

=== Helmet of Ciumești ===
One of the best known and most often reproduced pieces of Celtic art is the helmet found in a warrior chieftain's grave at Ciumești (now Satu Mare County, Romania). The Ciumești helmet is half-round with a neck protector and was hammered out of a single bronze plate with the cheek pieces bolted on afterwards. A bronze spike protrudes through the top of the helmet to which is fixed a cylinder on which a bird perches. The legs and the underpart of the head are cast while the remainder is hammered. The eyes are yellow ivory with a red enamel pupil, fastened in with bitumen. Overall the bird is 13 inches (330 mm) in length and has a wingspan of 9 inches (230 mm). The wings originally articulated at the body so that they would have flapped up and down as the wearer moved.

The bird, whether raven, eagle or falcon, is a known Celtic totem. The representation of the bird of prey hovering over the Ciumești helmet had a profound supernatural significance since in the world of the La Tène Celts based on the ample documentary evidence endorsing the special ritual associations of birds. Note that the Gundestrup cauldron, now in Copenhagen, also depicts a bird crest on helmets.

Wilcox and McBride mentioned that their illustration of the iron Gallic warrior's helmet of the middle La Tène period had been reconstructed on the basis of the Ciumești helmet.

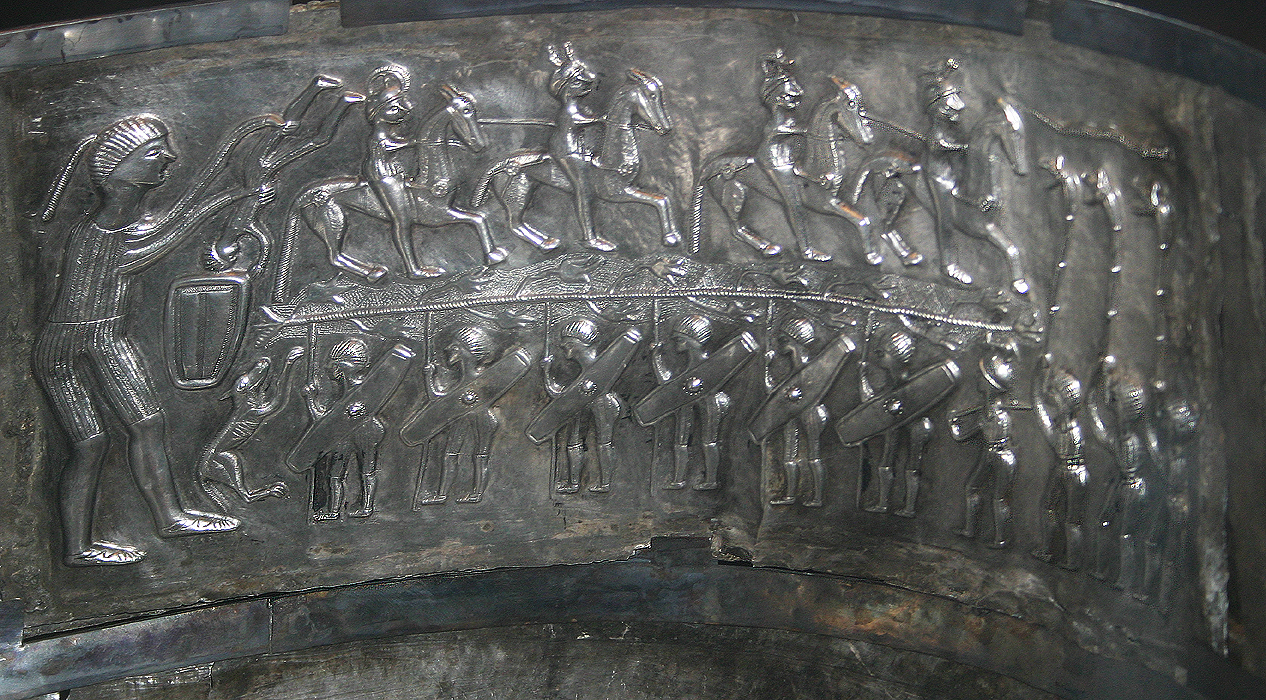
Gundestrup cauldron inside panel. One of the scenes provides a good parallel to the Ciumești bird helmet

=== Other Transylvanian helmets ===
Four other helmets of bronze or iron have also been found in the intra-Carpathian area at Silivaș (Alba County), Apahida (Cluj County), Ocna Mureș (Sibiu County) and Țara Hațegului (Hunedoara County). All these helmets are of the Waldalgesheim Style developed by the La Tène and date from the period when semi-victorious Celtic armies returned from the Balkan Peninsula and settled on the Pannonian Plain and in Transylvania.

Helmets with reinforced crests are typically eastern Celtic and can be traced as they spread from the western margins of Taurisci territory at Mihovo, to be subsequently used by the Scordisci at Batina and throughout Transylvania (Apahida, Ciumești).

=== Other Celtic art objects ===
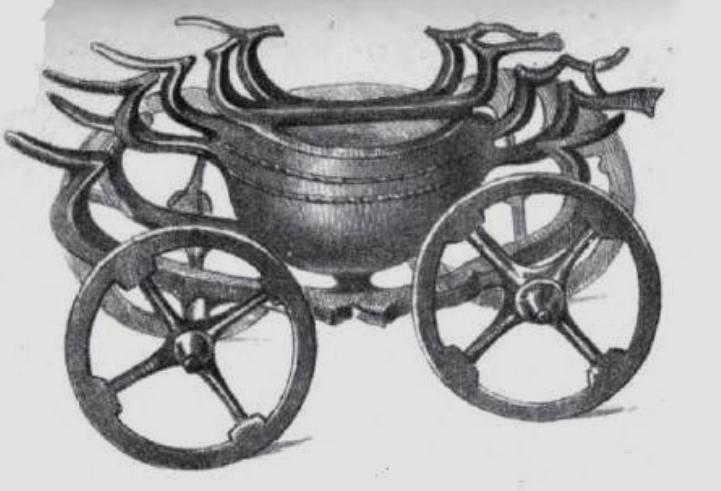
The wheeled cauldron or Kesselwagen Orăștie, Romania, used as a crematory urn, during the later Celtic Bronze Age. It is drawn by water-birds

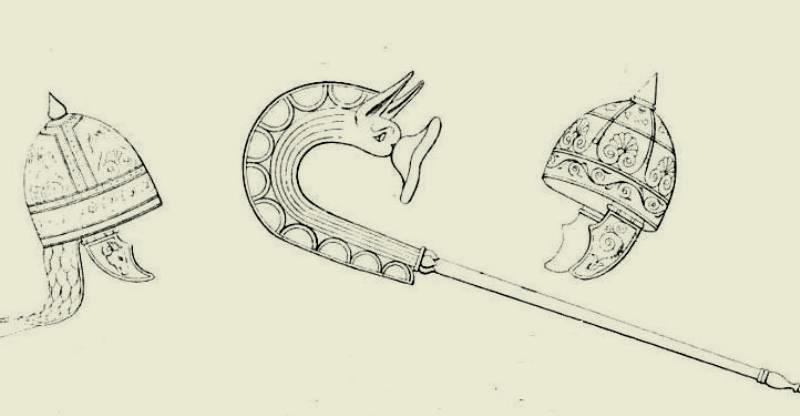
The Dacian war trumpet, as shown on the Roman Emperor Trajan's Column at Rome 116 AD, is a Celtic-style Carnyx. (n.b. The Celtic carnyx appears on the Gundestrup cauldron).

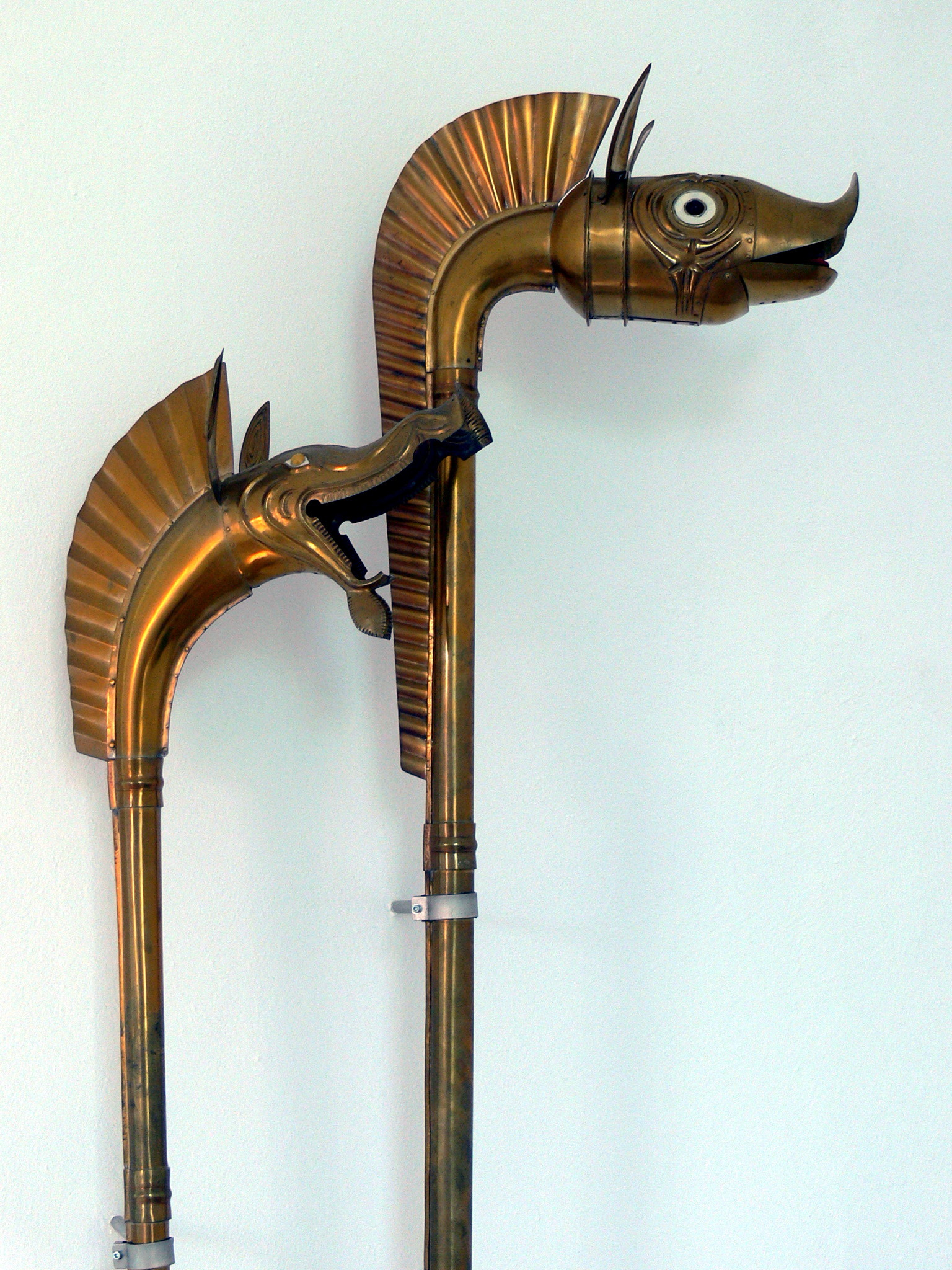
Celts' carnyx at Lure

A wheeled cauldron or Kesselwagen, used as a crematory urn during the later Celtic Bronze Age ritual assemblage, was found at Orăștie, Romania. This one is notionally drawn by teams of water-birds.

A coin type from Ciumesti shows a warrior wearing a wild boar crest on his helmet

The Dacian war trumpet, as shown on the Roman Emperor Trajan's Column at Rome 116 AD, is a Celtic-style carnyx.

=== Plastic Style ===
High-relief ornamental designs known as the "Plastic Style" are found on warriors' equipment from Pișcolt, comprising a shield with an ornate handle and shield-boss as well as a sword in an ornamented scabbard with traces of a "dragon-pair" motif. This motif is one of the genuinely pan-European themes of early La Tène art and is found embellishing the upper end of scabbard front-plates from southeast Britain to Transylvania.

=== Influences of the Thracian / Dacian style in works of Celts ===
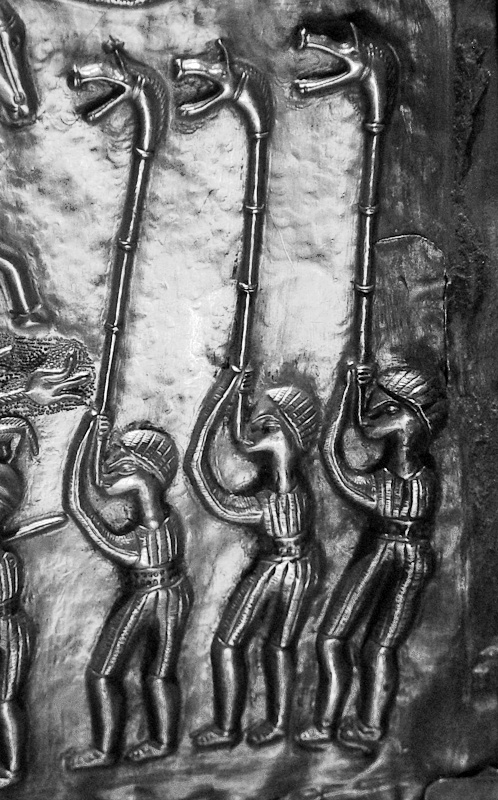
Figures with horns / carnyx on the Gundestrup Cauldron

From at least the 3rd century BC, the undoubted interaction between the La Tène Celtic and Dacian worlds can be considered a Thracian / Dacian influence on works of Celtic craftsmanship, or even imports from these regions. Such influence may be seen in the great silver ring from Trichtingen, near Stuttgart. Silver is not the prime medium of high-status craftsmanship in the Celtic world but is characteristic of Thracian / Dacian metal-working.

Moreover, the Ciumești Helmet and numerous later artifacts made partly or wholly of silver (fibulae or belt plates), clearly demonstrate the interaction between Thracian and Dacian schools of ornamental metalwork with the Celtic La Tène tradition.

Numerous studies of the artwork of the Gundestrup cauldron, provide comparative analyses of Celtic and Thracian traditions. Images on the cauldron have many features that are common to the Celtic and Thracian corpus of art while exotic animal motifs suggest an oriental influence. Although the design has features of Celtic belief and iconography, it appears to have been made by Thracian smiths in Dacia or Thrace, in the lower Danube region, according to their own traditions. The cauldron may have been commissioned by a member of Celtic community.

== Society ==
=== Coins ===
Mythological symbols feature on the earliest Celtic coins, which were struck in what is now modern Transylvania, Romania. This would result in the minting of later Celtic coins elsewhere that are considered miniature works of art. Evidence of the Hallstatt culture in Dacia, as well as the political and economic rule of the Celts, suggests that it was the Celts, not the Dacians, who minted these silver coins based on the Macedonian Tetradrachmae of Philip II (r. 382–336 BC). According to Zirra, this theory is supported by numismatist, C. Pedra, who argues that the Celts of Dacia first began minting coins in the mid-3rd to the mid-2nd century BC, after which, native mints lasted until the early decades of the 1st century BC.

=== Religion ===
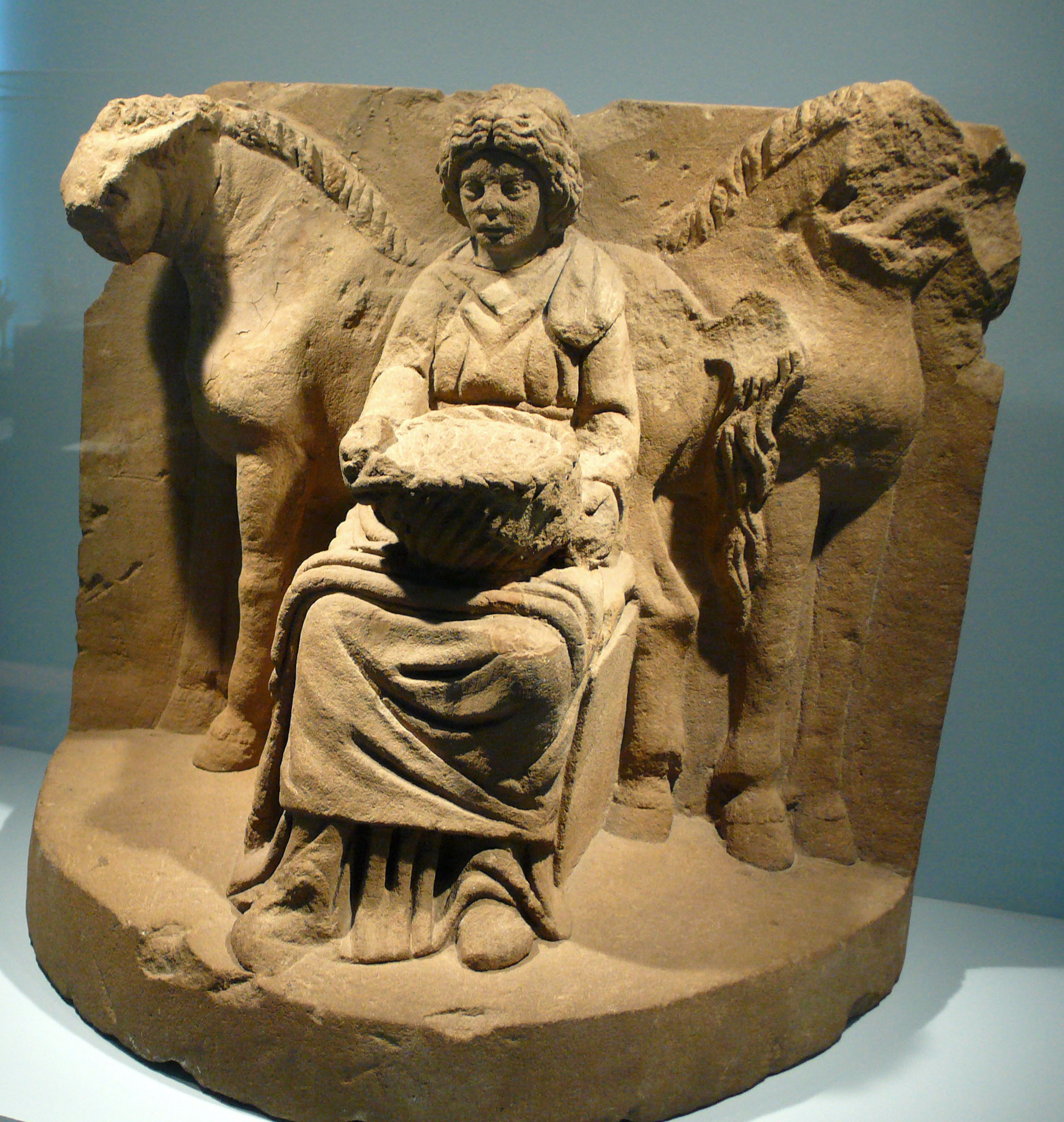
Epona (the horse-goddess) as seen at the Historical Museum of Bern, the most important Celtic cult attested to in Roman Dacia, 2nd century AD

The Dacian priestly class may have influenced the druids of the Celts with the important Christian author Hippolytus of Rome (170–236 AD), claiming that the druids adopted the teachings of Pythagoras through the intermediacy of Zalmoxis.

Roman Dacia's pantheon includes Celtic divinities brought to the province by both military and civilian elements. The most important Celtic cult attested in the new province is that of the horse-goddess Epona. Specific epithets in her honor as Augusta, Regina and Sancta are found on inscriptions from Alba Iulia, on the site of ancient settlement Apulon (Latin Apulum).

The stag-horned Cernunnos, one of the "great gods" of the Celts, was also known in the area according to two testimonies, one of them calling him Iupiter Cernenus, a name found nowhere else in the Empire. However, Cernunnos also has funereal attributions, not only as a protector of tombs but also as a psychopompos god.

References to Apollo Grannus and Sirona, divinities widespread in Gallia and on the Upper Danube as protectors of health are also recorded in Roman Dacia.

=== Language ===
Two out of the sixty known Dacian plant names are considered of Celtic origin, e.g. propeditla 'cinquefoil' (cf. Gaulish pempedula, Cornish pympdelenn, Breton pempdelienn), and dyn 'nettle'.

Celtic nomenclature carries the same onomastic weight as that of the Celto-Germanic cults in the religion of Roman Dacia.

== See also ==
- Prehistory of Transylvania
- Ancient history of Transylvania
- National Museum of Transylvanian History
- List of Celtic tribes in Thrace and Dacia
- List of Celtic cities in Thrace and Dacia
- Gallic invasion of the Balkans
- La Tène culture
- Celts
- Burebista
