= History of Oradea =

Chronological history of Oradea

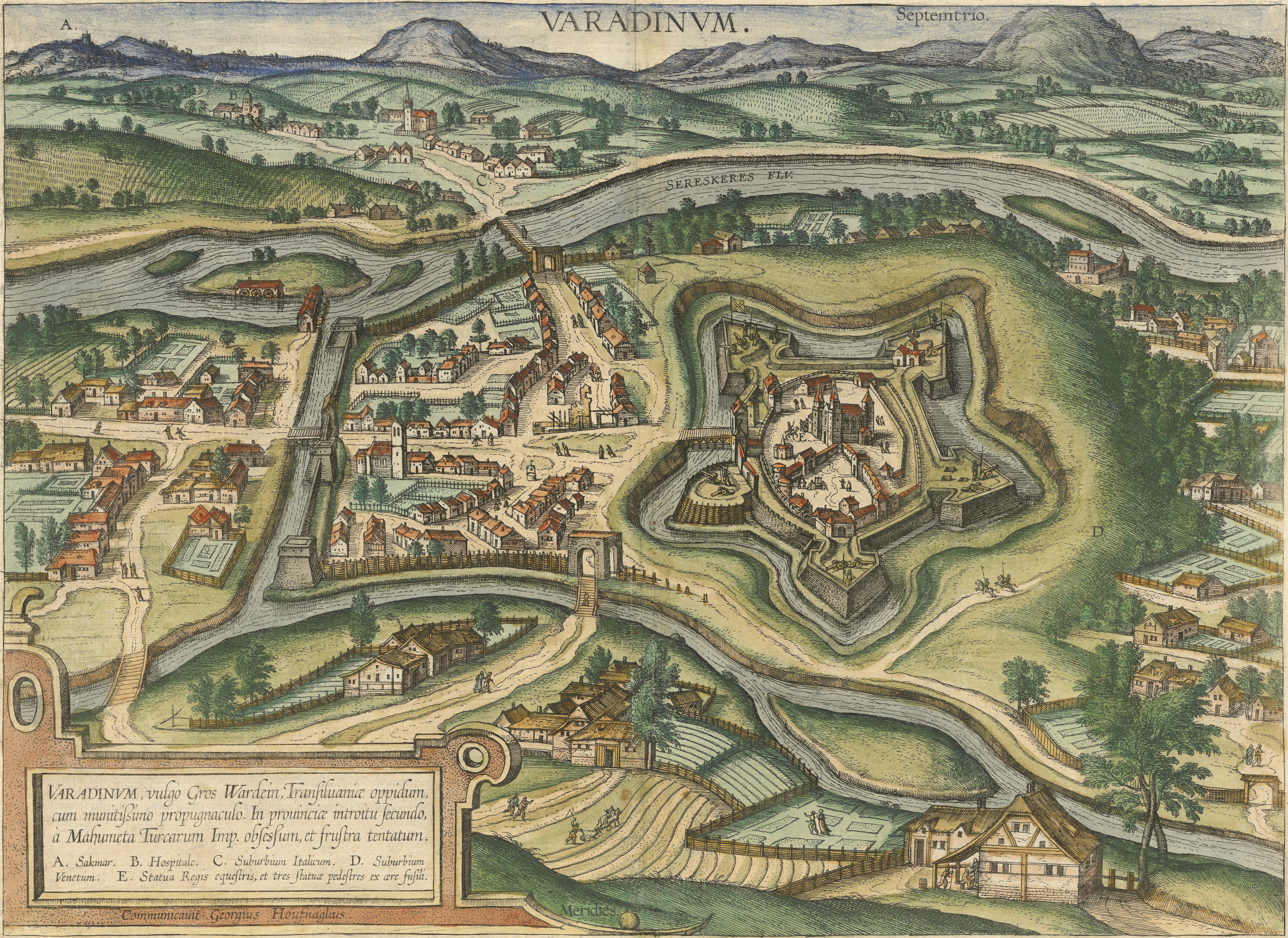
Varadinum (Oradea) in a 1617 engraving by Braun & Hogenberg

The history of Oradea is the story of the Romanian city from Neolithic times, through the Middle Ages when it flourished as an important center in Crișana, until its modern existence as the seat of Bihor County.

== Prehistory and ancient times ==
Archaeological findings, in and around the city, provide evidence of a more or less continuous habitation since Neolithic times. In particular, jewelry found near the area has been dated to Tiszapolgár culture during the Copper Age.

The Dacians and Celts inhabited the region. After the conquest of Dacia in 101AD, the Romans established a presence in the area, most notably in the Salca area of the city and modern day Băile Felix.

== Middle Ages ==
According to the Gesta Hungarorum, the territory - having its citadel centered at Bihar - was ruled by Menumorut at the end of the 9th and beginning of the 10th centuries, until the Hungarian land-taking. The first documented mention of Oradea's name was in 1113 under the Latin name, Varadinum ("vár" means fortress in Hungarian). In the 11th century when St. King Ladislaus I of Hungary founded a bishopric settlement near the city of Oradea, the present Roman Catholic Diocese of Oradea.

The city flourished during the 13th century in particular. The Citadel of Oradea, the ruins of which remain today, was first mentioned in 1241 during the Mongol invasion of Europe. The 14th century was one of the most prosperous periods in the city's life. Statues of St. Stephen, Emeric and Ladislaus (before 1372) and the equestrian sculpture of St. Ladislaus (1390) were erected in Oradea. St. Ladislaus' statue was the first proto-renaissance public square equestrian in Europe. Bishop Andreas Báthori (1329–1345) rebuilt the cathedral in Gothic style. From that epoch dates also the Hermes, now preserved at Györ, which contains the skull of King Ladislaus, and which is a masterpiece of the Hungarian goldsmith's art.

== Early modern ==
Georg von Peuerbach worked at the Observatory of Varadinum, using it as the reference of prime meridian of the Earth in his Tabula Varadiensis, published posthumously in 1464. Oradea was used for maps and navigation as the prime meridian between 1464 and 1667. In 1474, the city was attacked by the Turks. It was not until the 16th century that Oradea began growing as an urban area. The Peace of Várad was concluded between Ferdinand I and John Zápolya on February 4, 1538, in which they mutually recognized each other to be king.

After the Ottoman invasion of Hungary in the 16th century, the city was administered at various times by the Principality of Transylvania, the Ottoman Empire, and the Habsburg monarchy. In 1598, the fortress was besieged and, on August 27, 1660, Oradea fell to the Turks and became the capital of the Varat Province. This eyalet included Varat (Oradea), Salanta, Debreçin (formerly part of Budin and Eğri Eyalets), Halmaș, Sengevi and Yapıșmaz sanjaks. The siege is described in detail by Szalárdy János in his contemporary chronicle. The city was seized by the Habsburg-led German-Hungarian-Croatian forces in September 1692.

In the 18th century, the Viennese engineer Franz Anton Hillebrandt planned the city in the Baroque style. Beginning in 1752, many landmarks were constructed such as the Roman Catholic Cathedral and the Bishop's Palace, presently the Muzeul Țării Crișurilor ("The Museum of the Criș-es land").

== Late modern ==
The Hungarian Revolution of 1848 played an important role in the city's history. It was the home of the largest Hungarian arms factory while Debrecen was the temporary seat of the Hungarian government. In the second half of the 19th century, literary nicknames for the town included "Hungarian Compostela", "Felix civitas", "Paris on the River Pece", "the City of Tomorrow", "Athens on the Körös", and "the City of Yesterday". These nicknames are not widely used today, although "Paris on the River Pece" is still utilized sometimes.

== Twentieth century ==
As a consequence of Hungary's role in World War I, the Treaty of Trianon awarded Oradea to the Kingdom of Romania. Over 90% of the city's population was Hungarian then. Under the Second Vienna Award brokered by Germany and Italy in 1940, Northern Transylvania was returned to Hungary, including Oradea, but, being on the losing side again, had to relinquish claims to it under the Treaty of Paris which concluded on February 10, 1947.

In 1925, the status of municipality was given to Oradea, dissolving its former civic autonomy. Under the same ordinance, its name was changed from Oradea Mare ("Great" Oradea) to simply Oradea.

In the past, ethnic tensions sometimes ran high in the area, but the different ethnic groups now live together in harmony in general, thriving on each other's contributions to modern culture. There are many mixed Romanian-Hungarian families in Oradea, with children assimilating into both of their parents' cultures and learning to speak both languages.

== After the Romanian revolution ==
After December 1989, Oradea aimed to achieve greater prosperity along with other towns in Central Europe. Both culturally and economically, Oradea's prospects are inevitably tied to the general aspiration of the Romanian society to freedom, democracy and a free market economy, with varied initiatives in all fields of endeavor. Due to its specific character, Oradea is one of the most important economic and cultural centers of Western Romania and of the country in general, and one of the great academic centers, with a unique bilingual dynamic.

== Twenty-first century ==
In the 2020s, the city has become an economic hub in business and tourism. It is also known as a centre of Art Nouveau and architecture, earning the nickname of 'Little Paris'.

The fortress is on the Municipal Heritage List and has received European funding; it now hosts the University of Oradea's Faculty of Visual Arts.

== Jewish community ==
The chevra kadisha (burial society) was founded in 1735, the first synagogue in 1803, and the first community (or "communal") school (known as the Public Elementary School) in 1839. At the turn of the 20th century the old Jewish quarter, known as the "Katona Város", in the neighborhood of the town's original fort was still standing, and retained its ancient aspect. The converted fortress site and its environs continued to be inhabited mainly by Jewish families into the 1920s, as it had been since its disuse as a military facility in 1792. Until the beginning of the 19th century, Jews were not permitted to do business in any other part of the city. Even then they were required to withdraw at nightfall to their own quarter. In 1835, permission to live at will in any part of the city was granted to them. The old synagogue remained, though no longer used for worship, into the 20th century, as did the Jewish hospital in the same area. The buildings were demolished during the communist era.

The Jewish community of Oradea was divided into an Orthodox and Neolog congregations. While the members of the Neolog community still retained their membership in the chevra kadisha, they began to use a cemetery of their own in 1899. By the early 20th century, the Jews of Oradea had won prominence in the public life of the city; there were Jewish manufacturers, merchants, lawyers, physicians, and farmers. The chief of police (1902) was a Jew and in the municipal council, and the Jewish element was proportionately represented. The community possessed, in addition to the hospital and chevra kadisha, a Jewish women's association, a grammar school, an industrial school (commercial or vocational school) for boys and girls, a yeshiva, and a soup kitchen to name a few.

The following are among those who have held the rabbinate of Oradea:

- Naftali Hirtz Lifchovitz (Orthodox);
- Joseph Rosenfeld (Orthodox);
- David Joseph Wahrmann (Orthodox);
- Aaron Landesberg (Orthodox);
- Moricz Fuchs (Orthodox);
- Alexander Rosenberg (Neolog: removed to Arad);
- Alexander Kohut (Neolog: removed to New York, 1885; died, 1894);
- Leopold Kecskeméty (Neolog).

According to the Center for Jewish Art:

The Oradea Jewish community was once the most active communities, both commercially and culturally, in the Austro-Hungarian Empire. In 1944, 25,000 Oradean Jews were deported to concentration camps, thus decimating this vital community. Three hundred Jews reside in Oradea today. In the center of the city, towering over other buildings in the area, is the large Neolog Temple Synagogue built in 1878. The unusual cube-shaped synagogue with its large cupola is one of the largest in Romania. The inside has a large organ and stucco decorations. In 1891, the Orthodox community also built a complex of buildings, including two synagogues and a community center.

== See also ==
- Timeline of Oradea
- Prehistory of Transylvania
- Ancient history of Transylvania
- History of Transylvania

== Sources ==
- Deutsch, Gotthard; Kecskeméti, G. (1904). "GROSSWARDEIN (NAGY-VARAD)". In Singer, Isidore; et al. (eds.). The Jewish Encyclopedia. Vol. 6. New York: Funk & Wagnalls. p. 96.
- This article incorporates text from a publication now in the public domain: Singer, Isidore; et al., eds. (1901–1906). "Oradea". The Jewish Encyclopedia. New York: Funk & Wagnalls.
