= Pișcolt oil field =

Oil field in Satu Mare County, Romania

Pișcolt
- Country: Romania
- Region: Satu Mare County
- Offshore/onshore: onshore
- Operator: Rompetrol

Field history
- Discovery: 2005
- Start of development: 2005
- Start of production: 2008

Production
- Current production of oil: 500 barrels per day (~25,000 t/a)
- Estimated oil in place: 2.7 million tonnes (~ 3×10^{6} m^{3} or 20 million bbl)

The Pișcolt oil field is located in Pișcolt, Satu Mare County, Romania. The oilfield was discovered in 2005 and developed by the Romanian oil company Rompetrol. Production began in 2008, the total proven reserves of the Pișcolt oil field are around 20 million barrels (2.7 million tonnes). Production is around 500 barrels per day (79 m^{3}/d).
