= Vețca =

Vețca Székelyvécke
- Commune
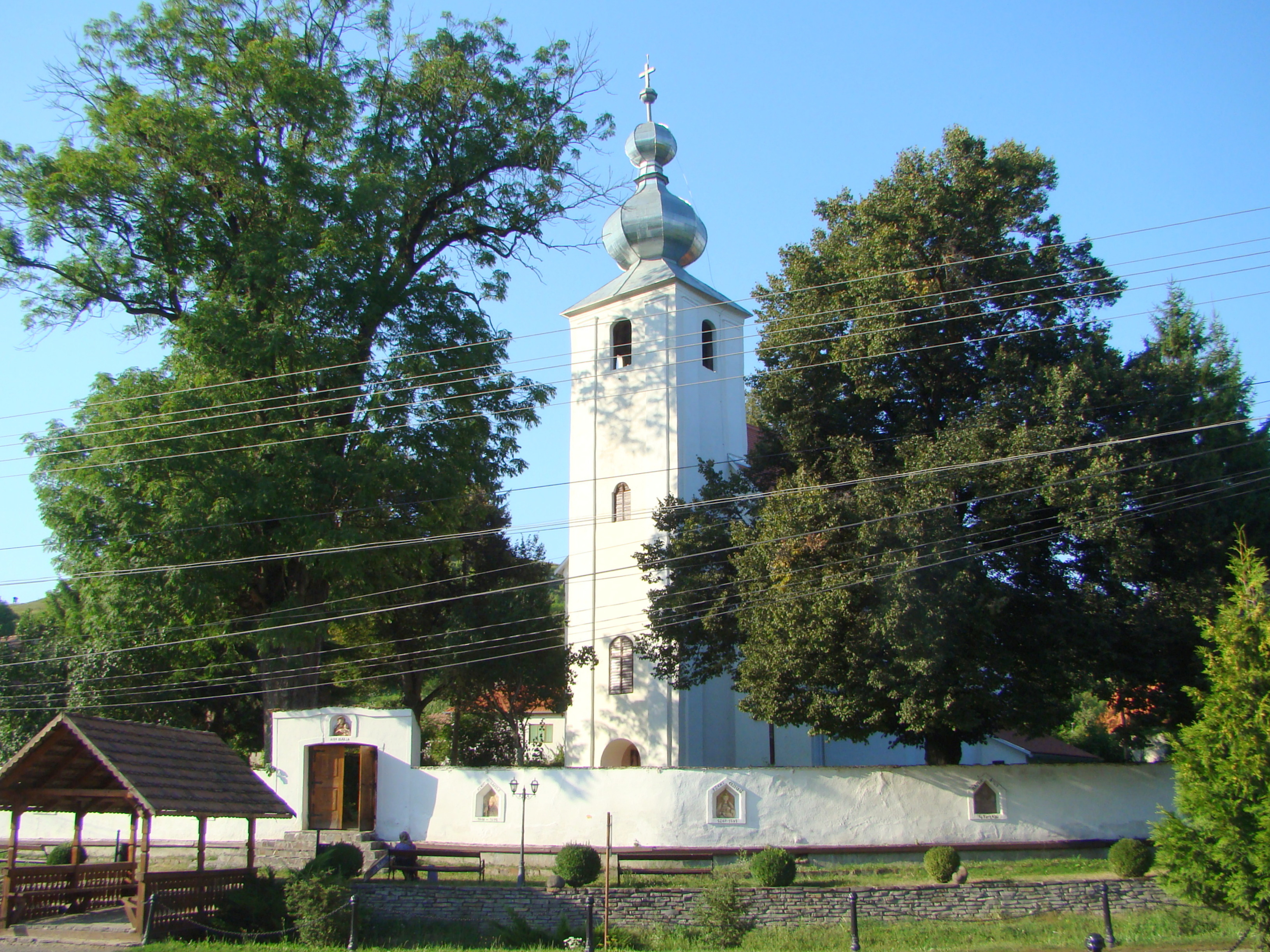
- Roman Catholic church in Vețca

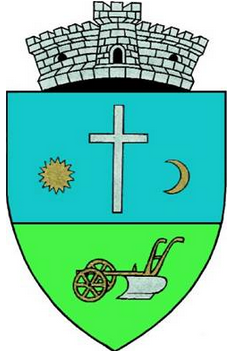
- Coat of arms

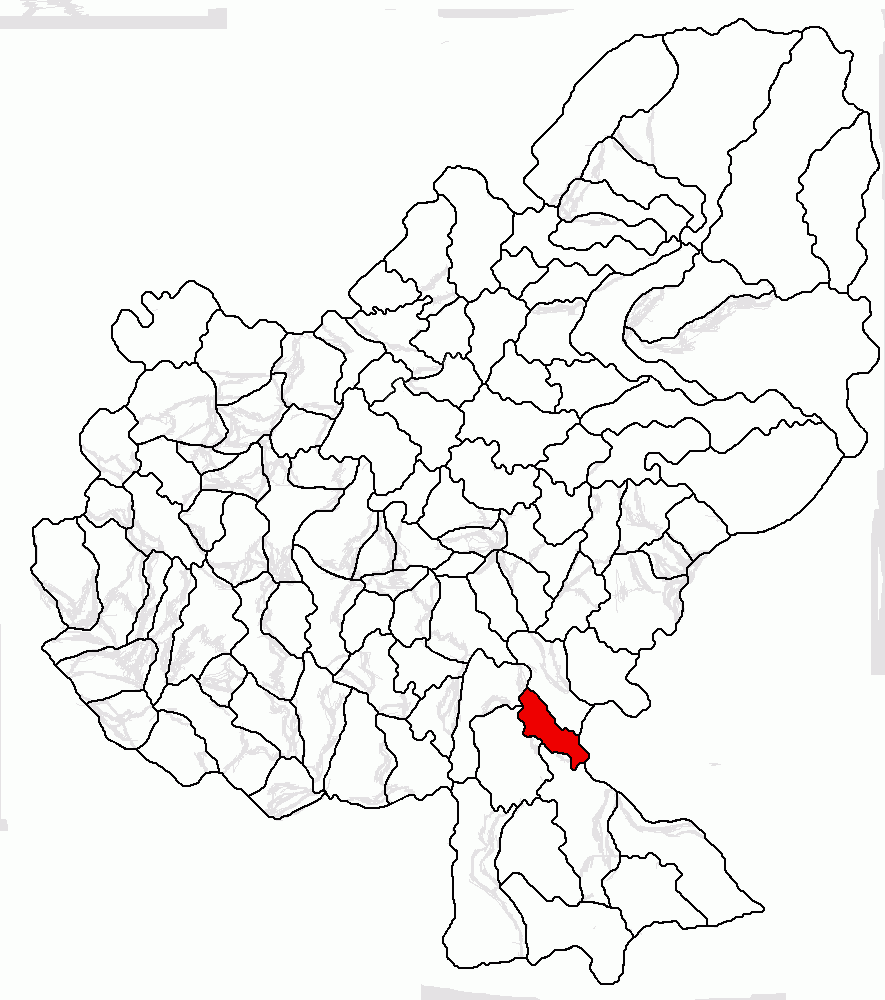
- Location in Mureș County

- Location in Romania
- Coordinates: 46°21′N 24°47′E
- Country: Romania
- County: Mureș

Government
  - Mayor (2024–2028): Pál Fekete (UDMR)
- Area: 37.49 km^{2} (14.47 sq mi)
- Elevation: 379 m (1,243 ft)
- Population (2021-12-01): 753
  - Density: 20.1/km^{2} (52.0/sq mi)
- Time zone: UTC+02:00 (EET)
  - Summer (DST): UTC+03:00 (EEST)
- Postal code: 547640
- Area code: (+40) 02 65
- Vehicle reg.: MS
- Website: primariavetca.ro

Vețca (Hungarian: Székelyvécke or colloquially Vécke, Hungarian pronunciation:[ˈseːkɛjveːtskɛ]) is a commune in Mureș County, Transylvania, Romania that is composed of three villages: Jacodu (Magyarzsákod), Sălașuri (Székelyszállás), and Vețca.

== Geography ==
The commune is situated on the Transylvanian Plateau, on the banks of the river Vețca, at an altitude of 379 m (1,243 ft). It is located in the southeastern part of Mureș County, 35 km (22 mi) from the county seat, Târgu Mureș, on the border with Harghita County. Vețca is crossed by county road DJ1134, which joins it to Fântânele, 10 km (6.2 mi) to the north, and to Șoard, 17 km (11 mi) to the southeast.

== History ==
Vețca is part of the Székely Land region of the historical Transylvania province. Until 1918, the village belonged to the Maros-Torda County of the Kingdom of Hungary. After the Hungarian–Romanian War of 1918–19 and the Treaty of Trianon of 1920, it became part of Romania.

== Demographics ==
The commune has an absolute Hungarian majority. According to the 2011 census, it had a population of 892; out of those, 84.9% were Hungarians, 11.0% were Roma, and 1.3% were Romanians. At the 2021 census, Vețca had a population of 753; out of those, 89.24% were Hungarians, 6.77% were Roma, and 2.12% were Romanians.

== See also ==
- List of Hungarian exonyms (Mureș County)
