= Timeline of Oradea =

The following is a timeline of Oradea, a city in western Romania, between the 9th and 16th centuries.

- 9th-10th centuries: According to Gesta Hungarorum, Menumorut ruled the area - with a citadel centered in Bihar - until the Hungarian conquest of the Carpathian Basin.
- 10th century: Várad (vár = castle, -ad = diminutive suffix [cf. Herend, Kermend, Kövösd, Fertőd, Városd, Jobbágy, Hortobágy]) is founded.
- 1082–1095: The Várad Bishopric was founded by King Ladislaus I of Hungary.
- 12th century: Becomes a cultural and religious center of the Kingdom of Hungary.
- 1208–1235: Regestrum Varadinense, the oldest document mentioning Oradea
- 13th century: The city flourished.
- 1412: Wladislaus II of Poland visits the grave of St. Ladislaus barefoot.
- 1437: Sigismund dies and was buried in Oradea Cathedral.
- 1445: John Vitéz of Zredna becomes bishop.
- 1474: The city is devastated by the Turks.
- 1514: A peasant uprising, led by György Dózsa, ransacked and burned the city.
- 1526: Bishop of Oradea Francis Perenyi is killed in the Battle of Mohács.
- 1538: Zápolyai’s ablest adviser, the Croat Franciscan Friar George, mediates the secret agreement of Oradea in which each claimant (Ferdinand of Habsburg and John I of Hungary) recognises the other's title and the territorial status quo.
- 1541: Buda falls, and refugees arrive in Oradea.
- 1557: Queen Isabella's captain, Tamas Varkoch, captures the fortress and the bishopric's estates are confiscated.
- 1565: Saint Ladislaus' grave is defaced.
- 1570–1596: A new fortress is built in late-Italian Renaissance style.
- 1598–1606: Oradea secedes from Transylvania.
- 1598: The fortress is besieged and, on August 27, 1660, Oradea falls to the Turks.

== See also ==
- History of Oradea
- Prehistory of Transylvania
- Ancient history of Transylvania
- History of Transylvania
