= Călimănești (disambiguation) =

Călimăneşti may refer to several places in Romania:

- Călimăneşti, a town in Vâlcea County
- Călimăneşti, a village in Fântânele Commune, Mureș County
- Călimăneşti, a village in Puieşti Commune, Vaslui County
- Călimăneşti, a village in Mărășești town, Vrancea County

and to:

- Călimăneşti, a commune in Nisporeni district, Moldova
