= Sanislău =

Sanislău Szaniszló
- Commune
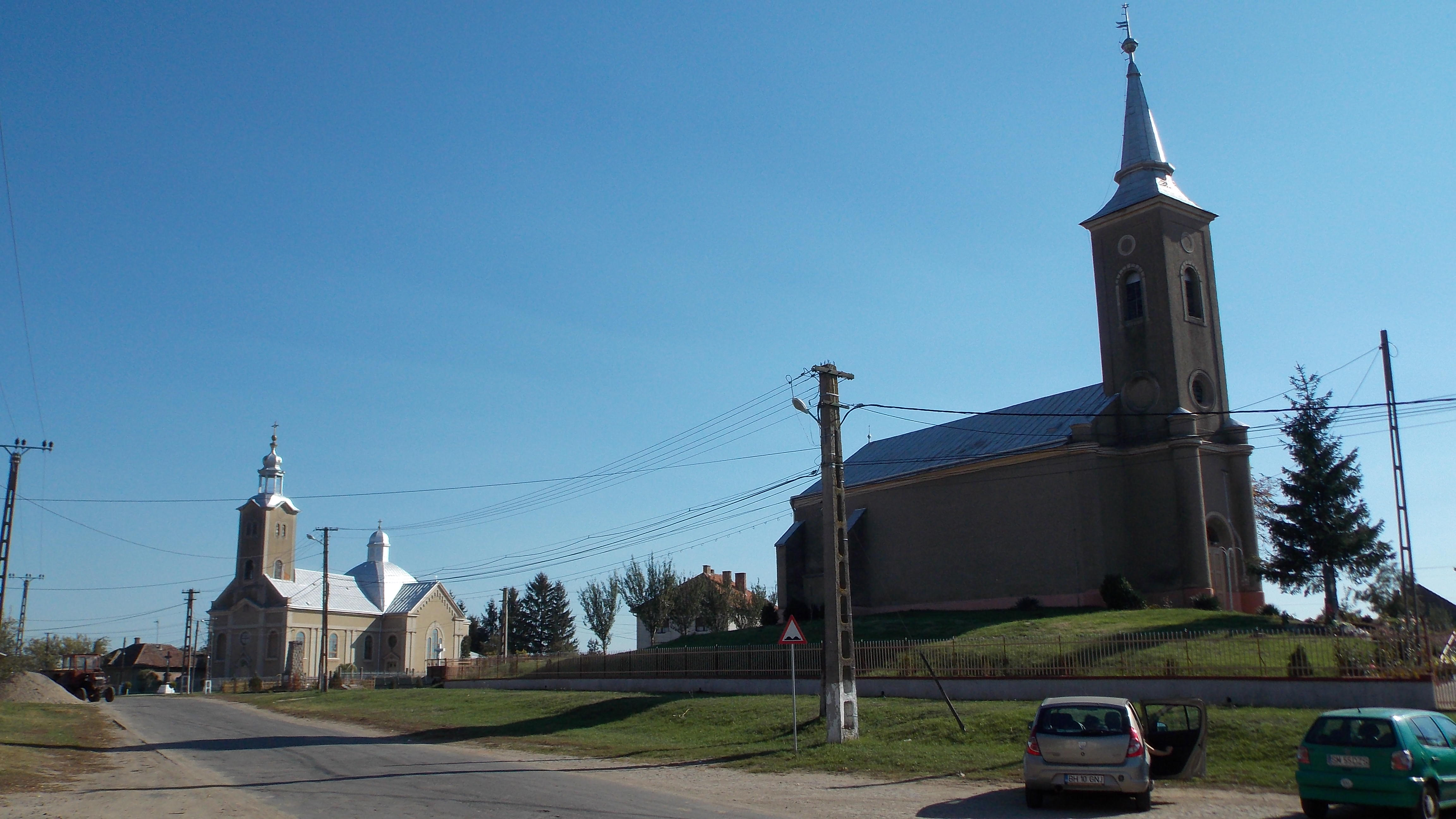
- Sanislău village center

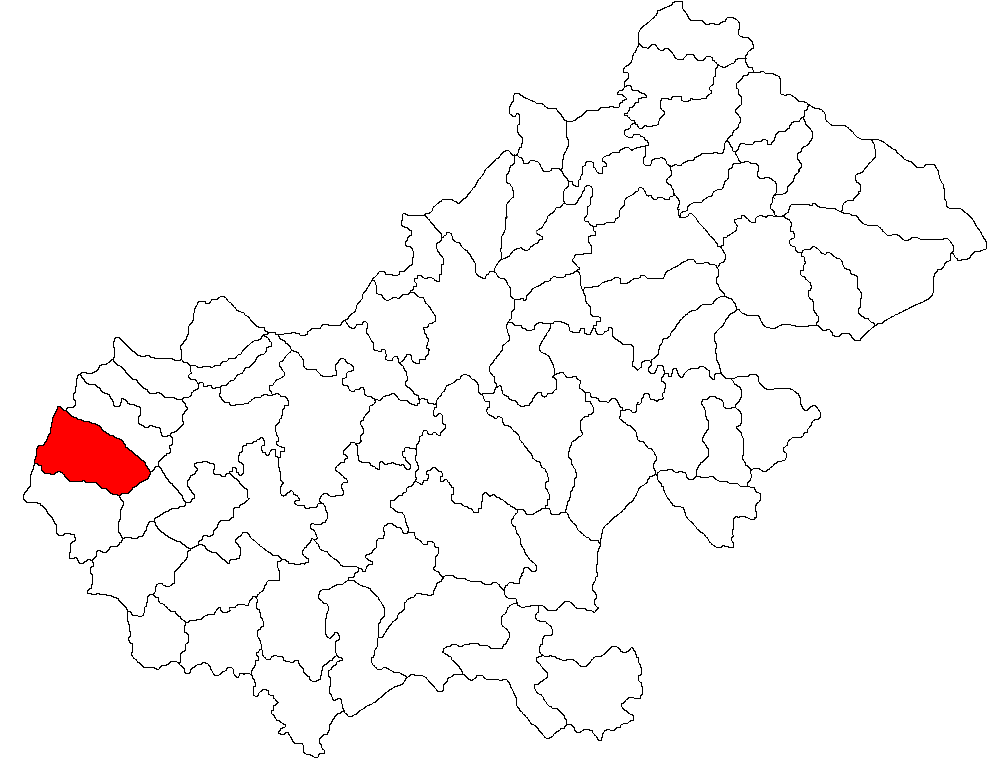
- Location in Satu Mare County

- Location in Romania
- Coordinates: 47°38′N 22°20′E
- Country: Romania
- County: Satu Mare

Government
  - Mayor (2024–2028): Krémer Stefan (FDGR)
- Area: 74.78 km^{2} (28.87 sq mi)
- Elevation: 132 m (433 ft)
- Population (2021-12-01): 3,223
  - Density: 43.10/km^{2} (111.6/sq mi)
- Time zone: UTC+02:00 (EET)
  - Summer (DST): UTC+03:00 (EEST)
- Postal code: 447260
- Vehicle reg.: SM
- Website: www.primariasanislau.ro

Sanislău (Hungarian: Szaniszló, Hungarian pronunciation: [ˈsɒnisloː]; German: Stanislau) is a commune of 4,986 inhabitants situated in Satu Mare County, Romania. It is composed of three villages: Horea (Károlyipuszta), Marna Nouă (Újmárna) and Sanislău. Until 2004, it also included Ciumești, Berea, and Viișoara, but these were split off that year to form Ciumești commune.

The commune is located at the western limit of the county, at a distance of 17 km (11 mi) west of Carei and 55 km (34 mi) from the county seat, Satu Mare. It borders Hungary to the west, Petrești commune to the east, Ciumești to the north, and Pișcolt commune to the south.

The Vermeș Swamp is a 10 ha (25 acres) protected area located on the territory of Sanislău.

== Administration ==
The current local council has the following political composition, based on the results of the votes cast at the 2024 Romanian local elections.

Party	Seats	Current Council
Democratic Forum of Germans in Romania (FDGR/DFDR)	4	
Hungarian Alliance of Transylvania (AMT)	3	
National Liberal Party (PNL)	2	
Party of the Roma (PRPE)	1	
