= Vețca (river) =

- Location within Romania

Location
- Country: Romania
- Counties: Mureș County
- Villages: Vețca, Bordoșiu

Physical characteristics
- Mouth: Târnava Mică
  - location: Fântânele
  - coordinates: 46.4128°N 24.7728°E
- Length: 17 km (11 mi)
- Basin size: 60 km^{2} (23 sq mi)

Basin features
- Progression: Târnava Mică→ Târnava→ Mureș→ Tisza→ Danube→ Black Sea
- Tributaries
  - right: Cib

The Vețca is a left tributary of the river Târnava Mică in Romania. It discharges into the Târnava Mică in Fântânele. Its length is 17 km (11 mi) and its basin size is 60 km^{2} (23 sq mi).
