= Ciumești =

Ciumești Csomaköz
- Commune
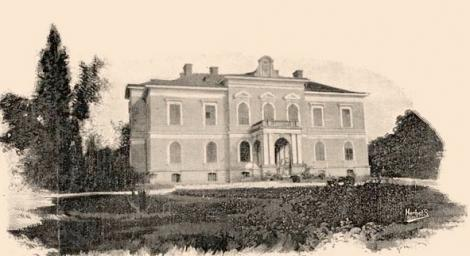
- Dégenfeld Castle

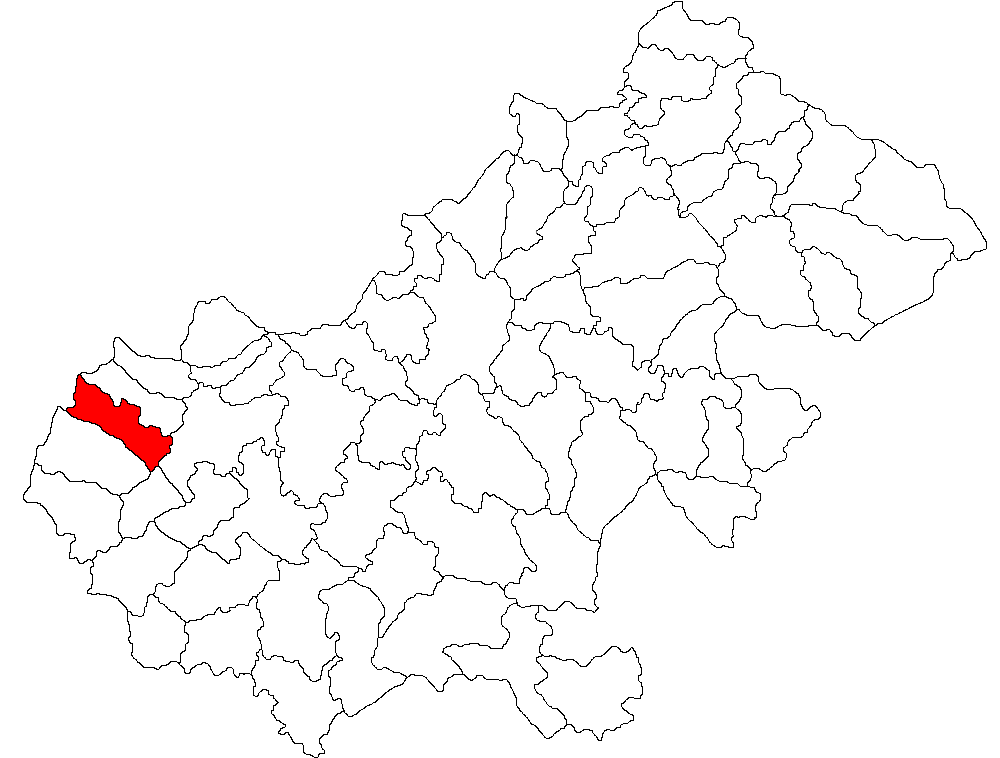
- Location in Satu Mare County

- Location in Romania
- Coordinates: 47°40′N 22°20′E
- Country: Romania
- County: Satu Mare

Government
  - Mayor (2024–2028): Ioan Schwarczkopf (PCM)
- Area: 45.33 km^{2} (17.50 sq mi)
- Elevation: 133 m (436 ft)
- Population (2021-12-01): 1,193
  - Density: 26.32/km^{2} (68.16/sq mi)
- Time zone: UTC+02:00 (EET)
  - Summer (DST): UTC+03:00 (EEST)
- Postal code: 447262
- Vehicle reg.: SM
- Website: primariaciumesti.ro

Ciumești (Hungarian: Csomaköz, Hungarian pronunciation: [ˈtʃomɒkøz]) is a commune located in Satu Mare County, Romania.

The commune is located in the western part of the county, at a distance of 13.3 km (8.3 mi) west of Carei and 49.6 km (30.8 mi) from the county seat, Satu Mare.

== Composition ==
The commune is composed of three villages that were separated from Sanislău in 2004:

| In Romanian | In Hungarian |
|---|---|
| Berea | Bere |
| Ciumești | Csomaköz |
| Viișoara | Ponyváspuszta |

== Administration ==
The current local council has the following political composition, based on the results of the votes cast at the 2024 Romanian local elections.

| Party | Seats | Current Council |
|---|---|---|
| Democratic Alliance of Hungarians in Romania (UDMR/RMDSZ) | 5 | |
| Democratic Forum of Germans in Romania (FDGR/DFDR) | 2 | |
| Hungarian Civic Party (PCM) | 2 | |

== History ==
=== Bronze and Iron Age ===
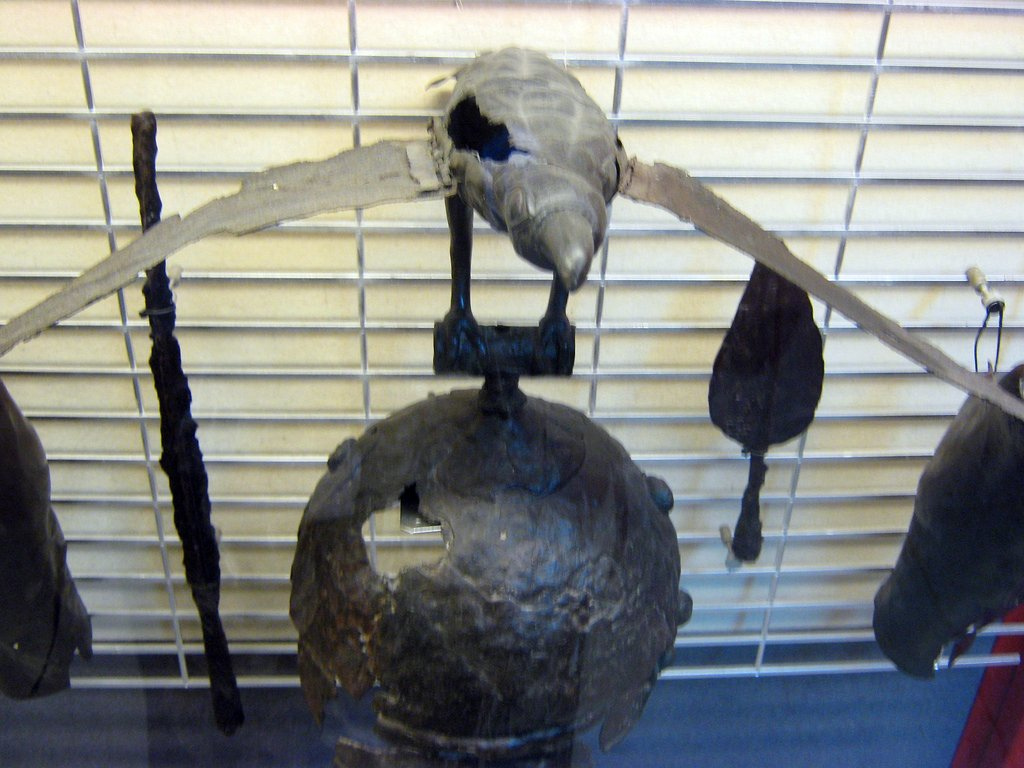
The Celtic Helmet of Ciumești, an Iron Age raven totem helmet, dated around 4th century BC. A similar helmet is depicted on the Gundestrup cauldron, being worn by one of the mounted warriors.

Human settlements dating from the Bronze Age have been found in the area, and during the 1960s, 35 Celtic graves were discovered, including the Helmet of Ciumești.

=== Modern times ===
Before the Treaty of Trianon in 1920, the villages belonged to Szatmár County of the Kingdom of Hungary. Until 2004, they belonged to Sanislău Commune, when they were split off to form Ciumești Commune.
