= Siege of Nagyvárad (1660) =

Siege battle of the Ottoman empire

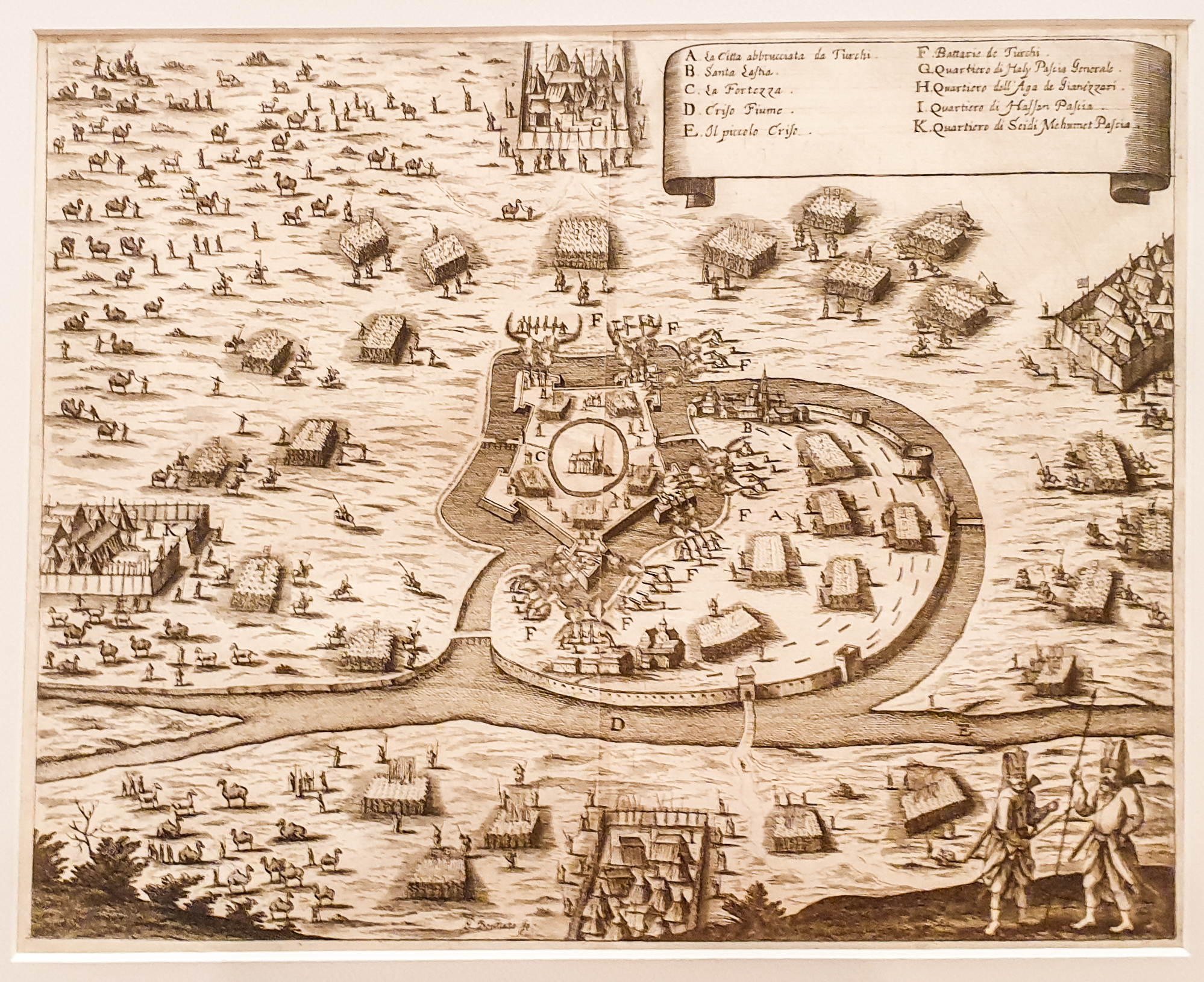
- Siege Nagyvárad (1660)
Date	15 July – 27 August 1660
Location	Oradea
Result	Ottoman victory

Belligerents
Principality of Transylvania	Ottoman Empire

Commanders and leaders
(Transylvania) Máté Balogh (Transylvania) János Rácz (Transylvania) Mihály Ibrányi	(Ottoman Empire) Ali Pasha (Ottoman Empire) Szejdi Ahmed pasha

Strength
850 men 69 cannons	50,000 men

Casualties and losses
550 killed	Heavy

The siege of Nagyvárad in 1660 was initiated by the Ottomans, led by Szejdi Ahmed Pasha and Ali Pasha, against the Transylvanian fortress of Várad (modern-day Oradea) which was the most important fortress in Transylvania. The Ottomans successfully captured Várad after 44 days of siege.

== Background ==
The Transylvanian prince György Rákóczi joined the Second Northern War to gain the throne of Poland, which fell into chaos. The Habsburgs, who were allied with the Poles, informed the Ottomans to recall the prince, but Rákóczi, confident of victory, disobeyed the sultan. This had negative consequences as, in the summer of 1657, Rákóczi was forced to return home defeated, and the upcoming Turkish-Tatar campaign threatened the destruction of the principality. Fearing the revenge of the Ottomans, the Transylvanians soon elected Ferenc Rhédey as their prince, but he soon resigned, and Rákóczi came to power again.

In 1660, Grand Vizier Köprülü Mehmed Pasha had enough of Rákóczi's and dispatched an army once more against the Principality. The towns in the Hajdú-Bihar County were destroyed by Szejdi Ahmed Pasha in the deadly raid called "Szejdi-raid," or "Szejdi-járás," as it was known to the Hungarians.

In May 1660, the Ottomans, led by Ahmed Pasha and Ali Pasha of Temesvár, defeated Rákóczi near Szászfenes, and two weeks later, Rákóczi succumbed to his wounds. Nagyvárad remained unprotected. The fortress held a strategic place as it was an entrance to Transylvania. The Ottomans then marched to capture the fort.

== Prelude ==
The garrison had only 850 men and 69 cannons,but hardly any of them were experienced soldiers, of whom only a few knew artillery usage. However, there was no doctor in the castle; only two barbers existed to heal the sick and wounded, but they worked without sufficient medicine. The garrison was led by Balogh Máté, and the officers were Rácz János and Ibrányi Mihály. Ahmed Pasha and Ali Pasha of Temesvár, along with 50,000 men, marched to capture the fort.

== Siege ==
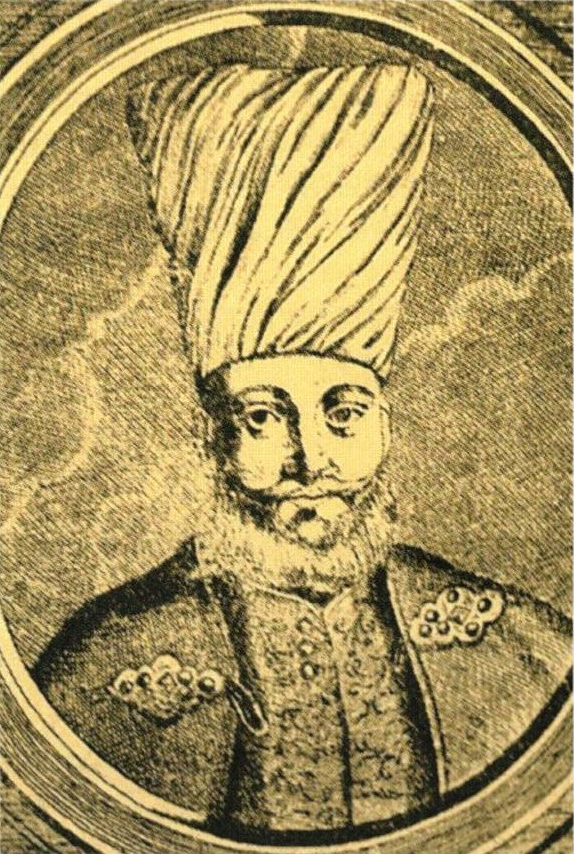
Szejdi Ahmed Pasha

On July 14, the Ottomans arrived and positioned themselves in three large groups. Ali Pasha's was located on the eastern side of the castle. Ahmed Pasha was located on the western side, and the third group was to the north of the castle. On July 15, during the preparations, Ali Pasha sent the garrison a message to surrender, but they refused. The Ottomans began installing cannons, and the defenders weren't able to prevent them.

The Ottoman artillery bombarded the fort with such accuracy that its shots not only flooded inside the fort but also penetrated the dungeons. The janissaries approached the water trenches of the castle step by step. With their non-stop bombardment, they repelled off the defenders of the Golden Bastion, who attempted to stop them but retreated behind the walls and attacked them over their heads. Ali Pasha planned to drain the water trenches surrounding the castle.

Unfortunately for the defenders, the extremely hot summer helped the Ottomans, and the water level in Körös was constantly extremely low, much to the delight of the Turks. However, after three weeks of difficult work, only 2/3 of the water in the trench remained, and there was still so much water left that it was impossible to begin the mine works. It took them a month to drain the water from the trenches and destroy the walls with mines and artillery. The defenders cleaned the rubble with shovels and picks at night, but their efforts were in vain because the walls continued to collapse the next day.

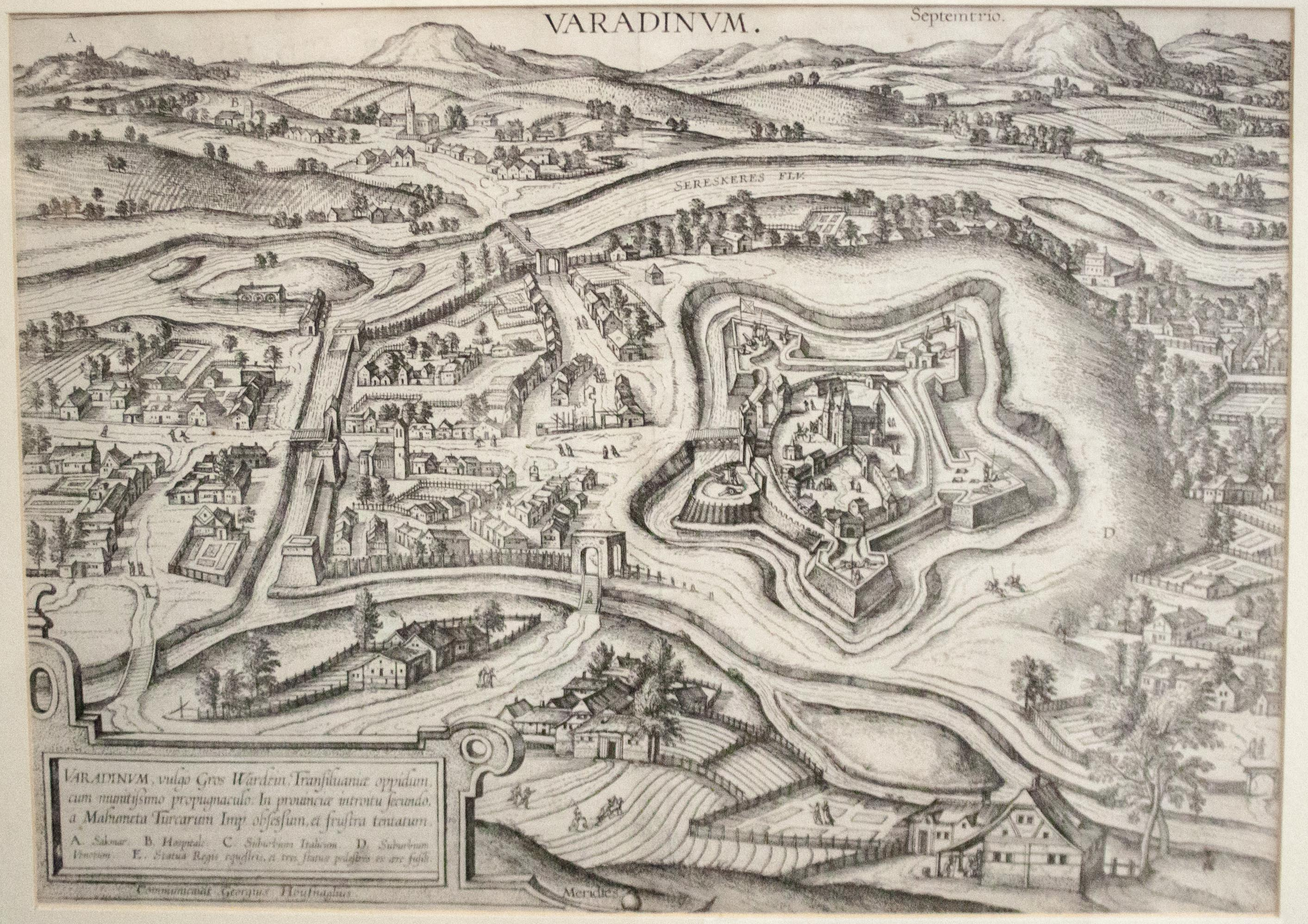
View of Varad and it's bastions

At dawn on August 24, Ali ordered an assault against the Veres and Aranyos bastions and also against the western side of the Csonka bastion. Since this bastion managed to hold off the bombardment, they attempted to assault it with ladders, but as the ladders did not reach the height of the wall, the attack failed. A fierce battle around the gaps ensued. Women and girls from the castle joined the fight and assisted them in repelling the attack with hot water, stones, and whatever they could find, which, with great effort, came at the cost of heavy losses.

The garrison suffered terribly from this attack, and only 300 remained. There was no escape but to surrender, which happened on August 27. The siege lasted 44 days. The garrison ceded Várad to the Ottomans. Ali Pasha admired their bravery and gave them favorable treatment. All the defenders were allowed to leave, as well as their families.

== Aftermath ==
The Habsburgs were criticized for allowing the fall of Várad without doing anything to help. The city came under Ottoman administration, and the vilayet of Várad was established. After the fall of Várad, Transylvania lost its independence.
