= Cohors II Gallorum Dacica equitata =

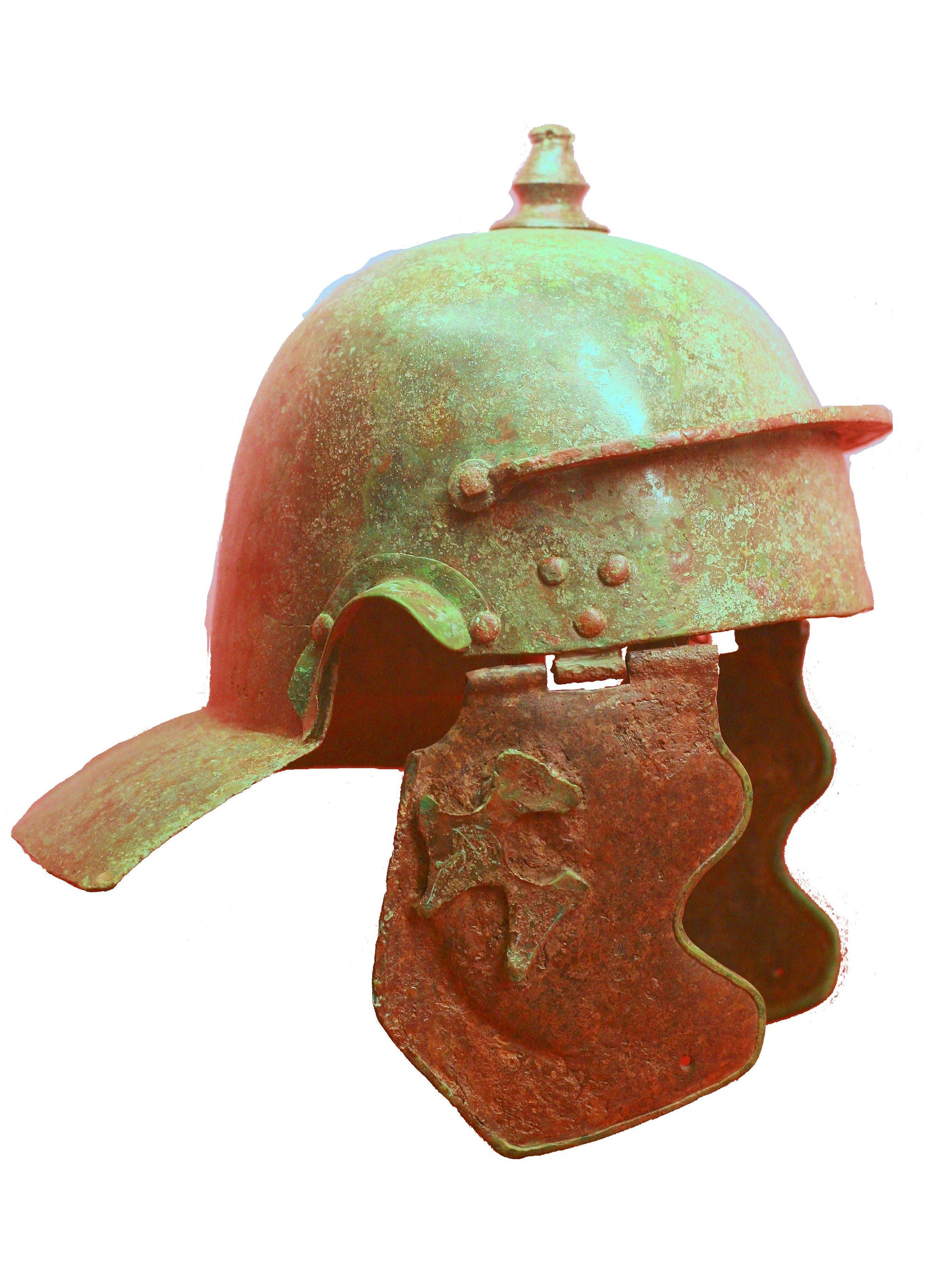
- Roman infantry helmet (late 1st century)
- Active: Not later than AD 14 to at least 179
- Country: Roman Empire
- Type: Roman auxiliary cohort
- Role: infantry/cavalry
- Size: 600 men (480 infantry, 120 cavalry)
- Garrison/HQ: Dacia 109-79

Cohors secunda Gallorum Dacica equitata ("2nd part-mounted Cohort of Gauls in Dacia") was a Roman auxiliary regiment which contained both infantry and cavalry contingents.

It was probably originally raised in Gallia Lugdunensis (northern France) during the rule of the founder-emperor, Augustus (r. 30 BC – AD 14). The regiment is first attested in Dacia (Romania) in 109, shortly after the end of the Dacian Wars (101-106) and thus probably participated in those wars. Its last datable attestation is from 179, still in Dacia Superior. Its later fate is unknown.

The regiment was previously known as II Gallorum Pannonica to distinguish it from another II Gallorum, which became known as cohors II Gallorum Macedonica, a purely infantry regiment. The title Dacica first appears in the record in 156.

The full name of just one praefectus (regimental commander) survives: Publius Licinius Maximus, from an undatable inscription on a dedicatory stone at Alhambra in Spain, which may have been his home region. Also attested (144) is a Thracian eques (ranker cavalryman), whose name is only partially preserved.

== See also ==
- List of Roman auxiliary regiments
