= Fântânele, Mureș =

Fântânele Gyulakuta
- Commune
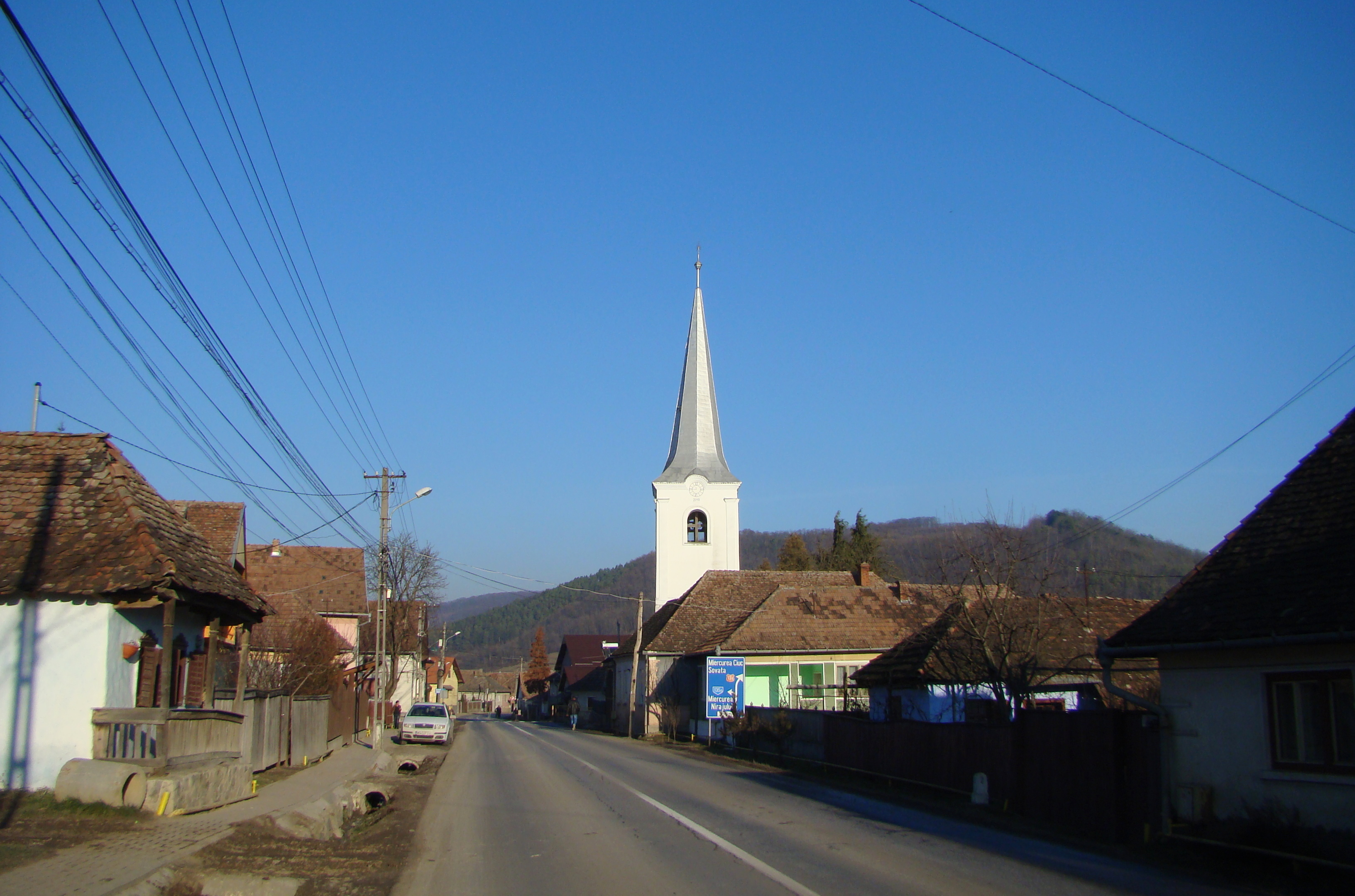
- View of Viforoasa

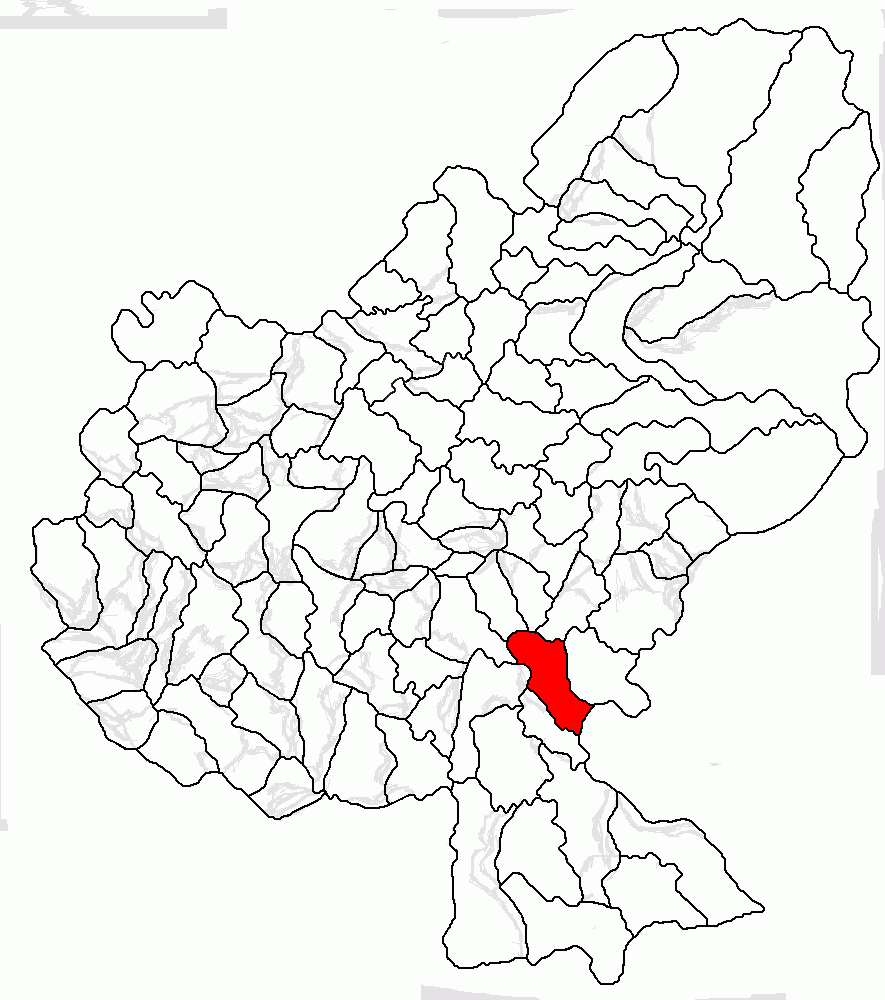
- Location in Mureș County

- Location in Romania
- Coordinates: 46°25′N 24°45′E
- Country: Romania
- County: Mureș

Government
  - Mayor (2024–2028): József Varga (UDMR)
- Area: 64.14 km^{2} (24.76 sq mi)
- Elevation: 336 m (1,102 ft)
- Population (2021-12-01): 4,854
  - Density: 75.68/km^{2} (196.0/sq mi)
- Time zone: UTC+02:00 (EET)
  - Summer (DST): UTC+03:00 (EEST)
- Postal code: 547235
- Area code: +40 x59
- Vehicle reg.: MS
- Website: www.fantanele-ms.ro

Fântânele (Hungarian: Gyulakuta; Hungarian pronunciation: [ˈɟulɒkutɒ]) is a commune in Mureș County, Transylvania, Romania composed of six villages: Bordoșiu (Bordos), Călimănești (Kelementelke), Cibu (Csöb), Fântânele, Roua (Rava), and Viforoasa (Havadtő).

== Geography ==
The commune is located in the southern part of the county, 28.3 km (17.6 mi) from the county seat, Târgu Mureș, on the border with Harghita County. It lies on the banks of the Târnava Mică River and its tributaries, the Balta and Vețca rivers.

Fântânele ss crossed by national road DN13A, which connects Bălăușeri, 6 km (3.7 mi) to the west, to Sângeorgiu de Pădure, 6 km to the east, and on to Odorheiu Secuiesc and Miercurea Ciuc in Harghita County.

== Demographics ==
The commune has a Székely Hungarian majority. According to the 2011 census, it had a population of 4,595, of which 93.84% or 4,312 were Hungarians. At the 2021 census, Fântânele had a population of 4,854, of which 94% were Hungarians, 2.35% Roma, and 1.57% Romanians.

Historical population
Year	Pop.	±%
1850	3,690	—
1880	3,838	+4.0%
1900	4,140	+7.9%
1910	4,324	+4.4%
1930	4,496	+4.0%
1956	6,612	+47.1%
1977	6,009	−9.1%
1992	5,329	−11.3%
2002	5,067	−4.9%
2007	5,011	−1.1%
2011	4,595	−8.3%
2021	4,854	+5.6%
Source: Census data

== Natives ==
- Szilárd Mitra (born 1987), footballer

== See also ==
- Roua gas field
- List of Hungarian exonyms (Mureș County)
