= Pișcolt =

Pișcolt Piskolt
- Commune
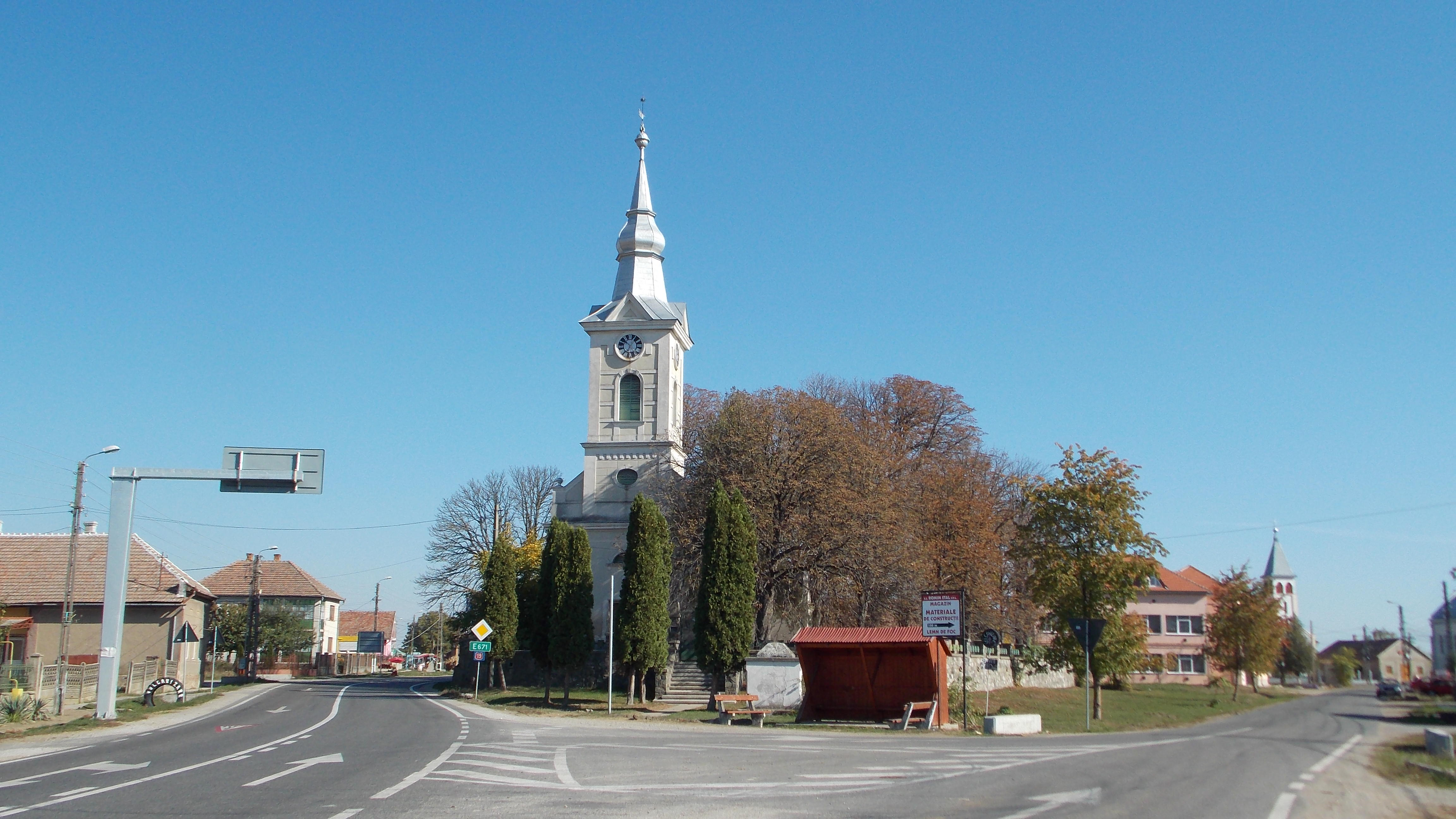
- Commune center with Reformed Church

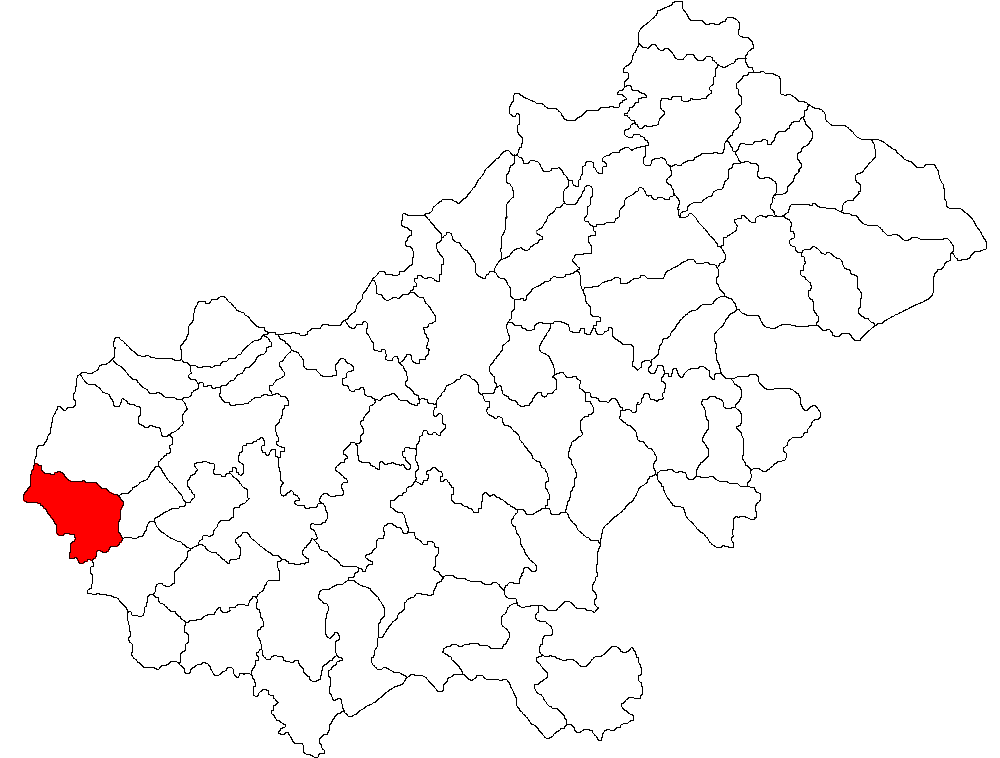
- Location in Satu Mare County

- Location in Romania
- Coordinates: 47°35′N 22°18′E
- Country: Romania
- County: Satu Mare

Government
  - Mayor (2020–2024): Cosmin-Vasile Varga (PNL)
- Area: 71.04 km^{2} (27.43 sq mi)
- Elevation: 128 m (420 ft)
- Population (2021-12-01): 2,932
  - Density: 41.27/km^{2} (106.9/sq mi)
- Time zone: UTC+02:00 (EET)
  - Summer (DST): UTC+03:00 (EEST)
- Postal code: 447250
- Vehicle reg.: SM
- Website: primariapiscolt.ro

Pișcolt (Hungarian: Piskolt, Hungarian pronunciation: [ˈpiʃkolt]) is a commune of 3,285 inhabitants situated in Satu Mare County, Crișana, Romania. It is composed of three villages: Pișcolt, Resighea (Reszege) and Scărișoara Nouă (Piskolcliget).

The commune is located at the western limit of the county, at a distance of 18 km (11 mi) southwest of Carei and 57 km (35 mi) from the county seat, Satu Mare.

The village Resighea was first attested in a document from 1215; as such, it is the oldest settlement in the county. The village Scărișoara Nouă was founded in 1924 by settlers who came from Scărișoara, Alba County and other places in the Apuseni Mountains.

== Demographics ==
Ethnic groups (2002 census):

- Romanians: 61.90%
- Hungarians: 24.39%
- Romanies (Gypsies): 13.26%

According to mother tongue, 62.67% of the population speak Romanian, while 37.08% speak Hungarian as their first language.

== Natives ==
- Claudiu-Lucian Pop
