= Rogojel =

Rogojel may refer to several villages in Romania:

- Rogojel, a village in Săcuieu Commune, Cluj County
- Rogojel, a village in Fărcășești Commune, Gorj County
