= Potra =

Potra is a Romanian surname. Notable people with the surname include:

- Dan Potra (born 1979), Romanian gymnast
- Gabriel Potra, Portuguese Paralympian
- George Potra (1907–1990), Romanian historian
- Horațiu Potra, Romanian-French security expert and mercenary
