= George Potra =

Romanian teacher and historian

George Potra (March 16, 1907 – December 19, 1990) was an Austro-Hungarian-born Romanian teacher and historian. He was one of the founders of the historical study of Bucharest.

He was born in 1907 in Săcuieu, Cluj County, but in 1911, his family moved to Bucharest, capital of the Romanian Old Kingdom, where his father worked as a glazier. He completed his secondary studies at the Matei Basarab High School, where Constantin Noica and Barbu Brezianu were his schoolmates. He then studied at the University of Bucharest, having Nicolae Iorga, Constantin Moisil, Nicolae Cartojan, and Constantin C. Giurescu as teachers. He graduated in 1932 magna cum laude and obtained his Ph.D. in history four years later from the same university. From 1932 to 1967, he taught history at some of the best high schools in Bucharest, including Matei Basarab, Mihai Viteazu, and Aurel Vlaicu high schools, as well as the one in Găești.

Potra was the father of the historian George G. Potra (1940–2015). He died in Bucharest in 1990, at age 83.

== Bibliography ==
His main work is Din Bucureștii de ieri, in 2 volumes, published in March 1990 by Editura Științifică și Enciclopedică (ISBN 9789732900185). Other historical works include:

- Contribuțiuni la istoricul țiganilor din România, Editura pentru Literatură și Artă, București, 1939. OCLC 1295418485
- Hanurile bucureștene, Tiparul Românesc, București, 1943. OCLC 895443157
- Documente privitoare la istoria orașului București: (1594–1821), Editura Academiei Republicii Populare Romîne, București, 1961. OCLC 899871625
- Documente privitoare la istoria orașului București: (1821–1848), Editura Academiei Republicii Socialiste România, București, 1975. OCLC 633554242
