= Aghireșu =

Aghireșu Egeres
- Commune
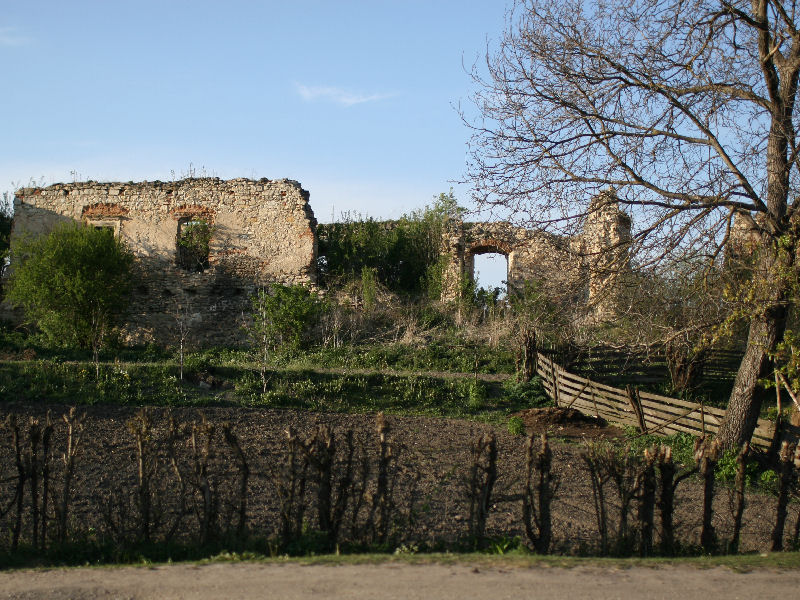
- Ruins of Aghireșu castle

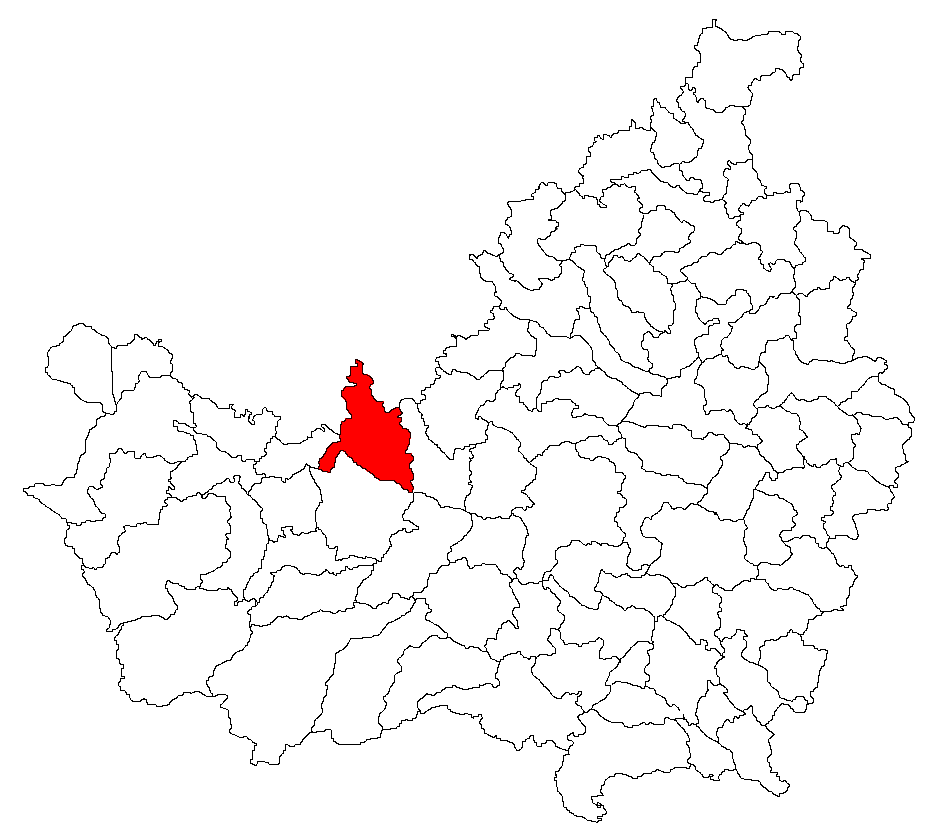
- Location in Cluj County

- Location in Romania
- Coordinates: 46°52′21″N 23°14′30″E
- Country: Romania
- County: Cluj
- Established: 1263
- Subdivisions: Aghireșu, Aghireșu-Fabrici, Arghișu, Băgara, Dâncu, Dorolțu, Inucu, Leghia, Macău, Ticu, Ticu-Colonie

Government
  - Mayor (2020–2024): Sorinel-Gelu Lehene (PNL)
- Area: 105.79 km^{2} (40.85 sq mi)
- Elevation: 447 m (1,467 ft)
- Population (2021-12-01): 5,691
  - Density: 53.80/km^{2} (139.3/sq mi)
- Time zone: UTC+02:00 (EET)
  - Summer (DST): UTC+03:00 (EEST)
- Postal code: 407005
- Area code: +40 x64
- Vehicle reg.: CJ
- Website: aghiresu.ro

Aghireșu (Hungarian: Egeres; German: Erldorf) is a commune in Cluj County, Transylvania, Romania. Covering an area of 105.79 km^{2} (40.85 sq mi), the commune is composed of eleven villages: Aghireșu, Aghireșu-Fabrici (Egeres-gyártelep), Arghișu (Argyas), Băgara (Bogártelke), Dâncu (Dank), Dorolțu (Nádasdaróc), Inucu (Inaktelke), Leghia (Jegenye), Macău (Mákófalva), Ticu (Forgácskút), and Ticu-Colonie (Ferencbánya).

== Demographics ==
Historical population
Year	Pop.	±%
1850	3,621	—
1880	4,387	+21.2%
1890	5,253	+19.7%
1900	5,608	+6.8%
1910	6,269	+11.8%
1920	6,221	−0.8%
1930	7,241	+16.4%
1941	7,254	+0.2%
1956	8,268	+14.0%
1966	8,857	+7.1%
1977	9,075	+2.5%
1992	8,001	−11.8%
2002	7,120	−11.0%
2011	7,116	−0.1%
2021	5,691	−20.0%
Source: Census data

According to the 2011 census, Aghireșu had a population of 7,116; Romanians made up 51.9% of the population, Hungarians made up 36.7%, and Roma made up 8.0%. At the 2021 census, the commune had a population of 5,691; of those, 53.42% were Romanians, 31.96% Hungarians, and 5.43% Roma.

== Natives ==
- Andrei Ianko (born 1958), wrestler
