= Poieni, Cluj =

Poieni
- Commune
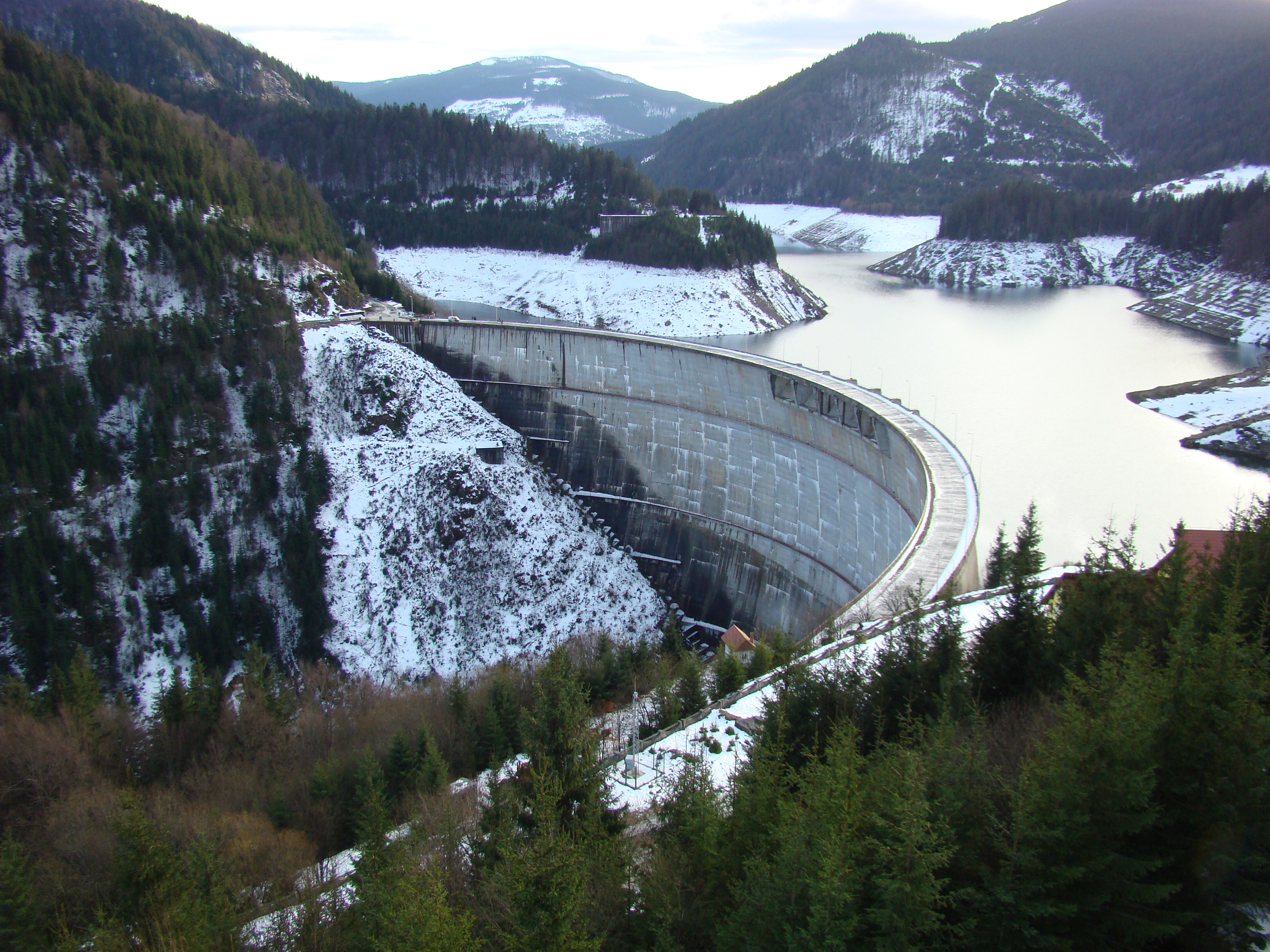
- Floroiu Dam

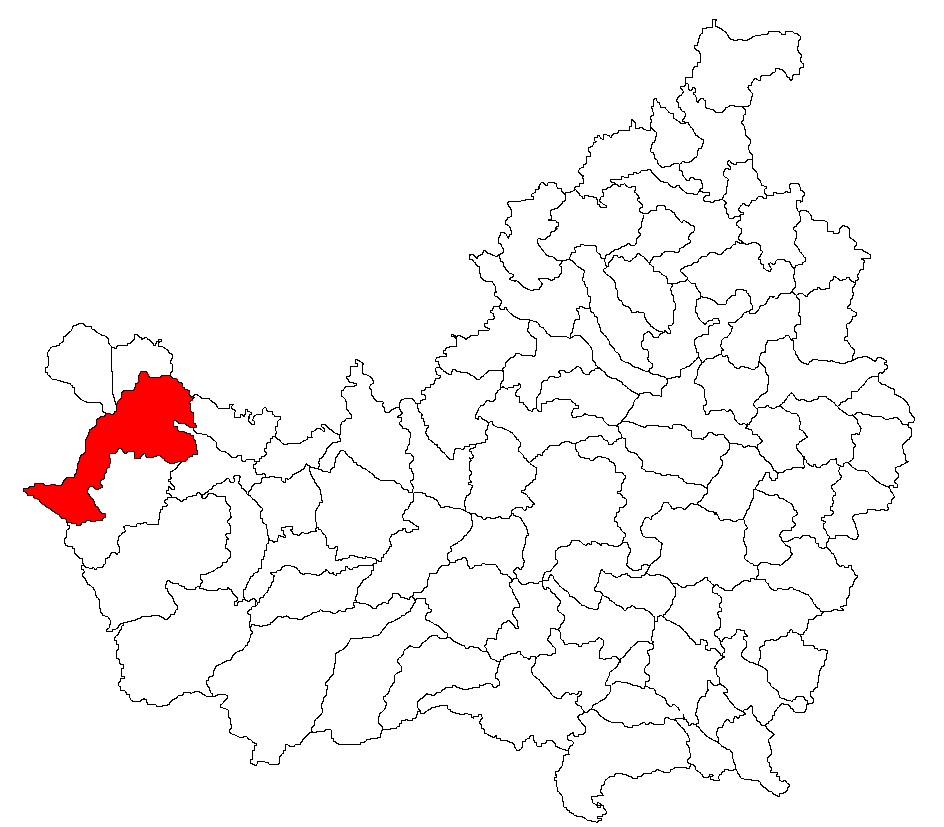
- Location in Cluj County

- Location in Romania
- Coordinates: 46°55′11″N 22°51′55″E
- Country: Romania
- County: Cluj
- Subdivisions: Bologa, Cerbești, Hodișu, Lunca Vișagului, Morlaca, Poieni, Tranișu, Valea Drăganului

Government
  - Mayor (2020–2024): Gheorghe Constantin Boca (PNL)
- Area: 190 km^{2} (73 sq mi)
- Elevation: 480 m (1,570 ft)
- Population (2021-12-01): 4,367
  - Density: 23/km^{2} (60/sq mi)
- Time zone: UTC+02:00 (EET)
  - Summer (DST): UTC+03:00 (EEST)
- Postal code: 407470
- Area code: +(40) x64
- Vehicle reg.: CJ
- Website: www.primariapoieni.ro

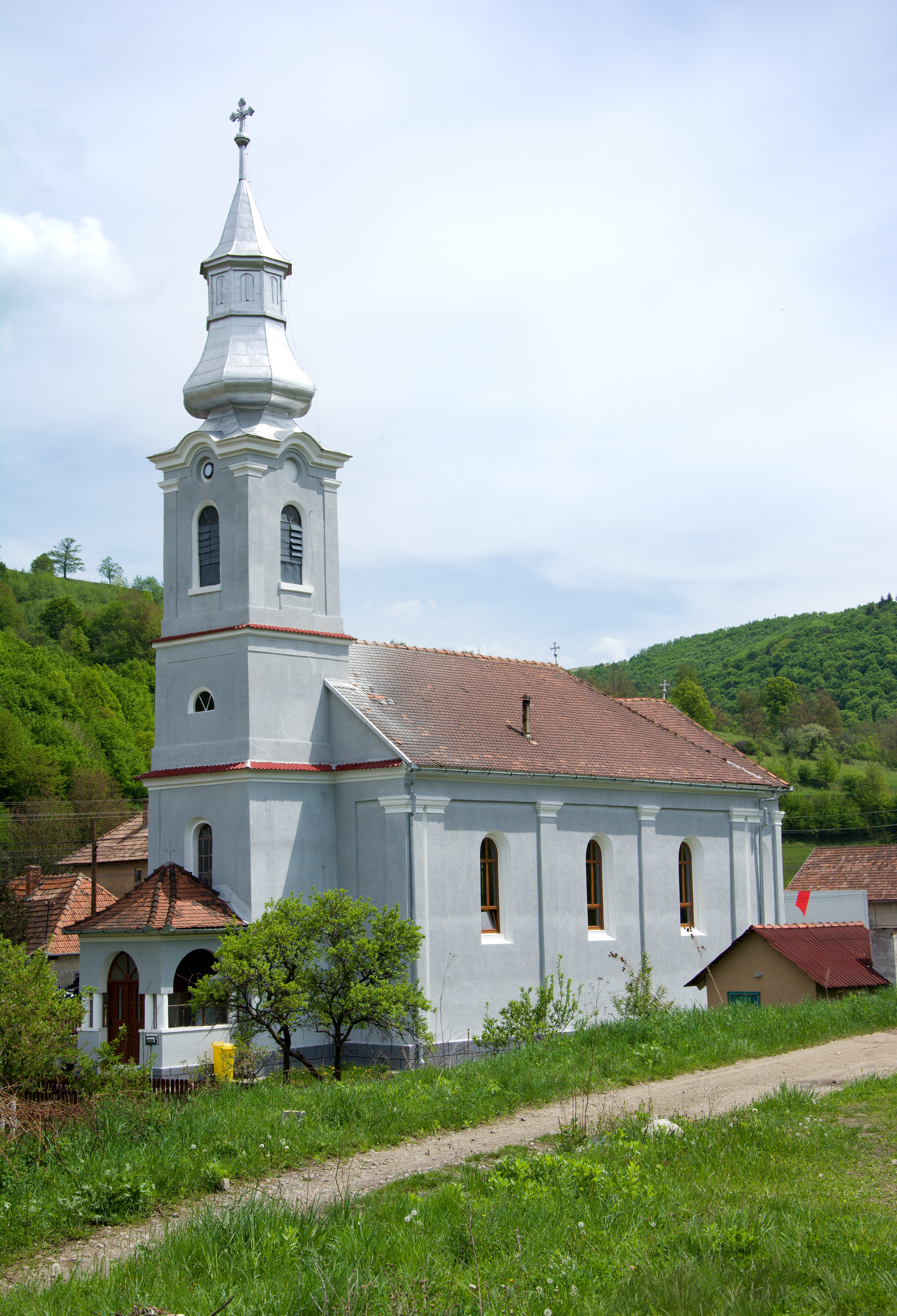
Church in Poieni

Poieni (Hungarian: Kissebes; German: Klein Weichselburg) is a commune in Cluj County, Transylvania, Romania. It is composed of eight villages: Bologa (Sebesvár), Cerbești (Kecskéstanya), Hodișu (Hodosfalva), Lunca Vișagului (Viságmező), Morlaca (Marótlaka), Poieni, Tranișu (Tarányos), and Valea Drăganului (Nagysebes).

== Villages ==
=== Bologa ===
Bologa (Latin: Resculum; Hungarian: Sebesvár) is a village in the Poieni commune, with a population of 687 people in 2002.

==== Geography ====
The village is situated at the confluence of the Crișul Repede and Săcuieu rivers (the confluence is known as "gura apelor" – "the mouth of the waters" – in the local toponymy) and at the foot of the Vlădeasa Mountains (1863 m), part of the Apuseni Mountains, in the western Carpathian Mountains. The closest town is Huedin.

Transportation links: on the European route E60. Small railway stop ("haltă") for regional trains ("Personal") on the Oradea-Cluj-Napoca main Romanian railroad. On the national road DN128 which heads south towards Săcuieu.

==== History ====
4000 years old artefacts (stone axes) were found at the place called "Drumul găunos" ("Potholed Road"). A Roman castrum called Resculum is the oldest documented settlement in the area. It was built around 106 AD, as a garrison for the “II Cohortis Hispanorum” (see Dux), whose mission was probably to defend the Roman Empire's border. As the Romans tried to tighten their hold on the region during the 2nd century A.D., they brought in colonists to the village from Greece, possibly from Patras. The ruins of the castrum are still visible today in the place still called "Grădiște" which means "fortified settlement", although most of the area is cultivated. The ruins of a Roman bath also exist near the castrum.

Overlooking the castrum, on the opposite bank of the Henț (Sebeș) river, on top of a steep hill lies one of the first Hungarian fortresses in Transylvania, which was mentioned for five centuries as Sebesvár, featuring on most Middle-Age maps of the region. Probably due to the fortress, the place was also known as Varalja ("under the fortress") or Sebesváralja. Bologa was first attested in 1304 as Sebuswar then as Sepuswar in 1324, Sebeswar in 1329, Sebeswar alio nomine Hunyadwar in 1398, Castrum regis Sebes in 1393, Castrum regis Hunyad in 1397, and Sebes Varallya in 1760.

The Hungarian king, Sigismund of Luxembourg after signing in Brașov an alliance treaty against the Turks in 1399 gave the fortresses of Bran and Bologa to Wallachia's prince Mircea cel Bătrân. Built to watch the strategic road that went from Oradea inside Transylvania, the fortress also served as a refuge for the local population throughout the centuries. It gained in importance when the Turks conquered Oradea in the 17th century as it was hindering the tax collection. The sultan ordered its demolition but the order was not carried out. The fortress was later destroyed by the Austrian soldiers through explosion. The tower and many walls are still standing. In the mid 20th century the tower lost its roof, probably the last wooden element of the ruins. All that remains is stone.

Probably it was after the Union of Transylvania with Romania in December 1918 that the current name (Bologa) was assigned. The etymology is not clear.

The Second Vienna Award in August 1940 temporarily re-situated Bologa and all of Northern Transylvania in Hungary, right at the border (some territory on the hills nearby remained in Romania). This began yet another period of tensions between ethnic Romanians and Hungarians which ended in October 1944 when the Romanian and Soviet armies defeated the Hungarian and German armies in the area, and in March 1945 with the restoration of Romania's western border.

A stone quarry was opened in 1930 providing dacite stone for the Budapest-Bucharest road. The quarry was later on taken over by the Romanian railways, most of whose embankments are made of stone from the area. After 1989 the quarry was privatised and did not do very well comparing to neighbouring quarries, so it stopped being the main source of income for the villagers. The upcoming highway projects in Romania are expected to improve the quarry prospects.

Forestry is also active in the area, though more active in the neighbouring valley of Drăgan. Agriculture is widely practiced but the land size and quality in the hilly-mountainous area only allows for the individual needs of the land owners.

== Demographics ==
According to the census from 2011, there were 4,724 people living in this commune; of this population, 93.96% were ethnic Romanians, 5.39% ethnic Roma, and 0.6% ethnic Hungarians. At the 2021 census, Poieni had a population of 4,367; of those, 80.22% were Romanians and 6.25% Roma.

== Natives ==
- Gavril Dejeu (born 1932), politician
