= Câțcău =

- Commune
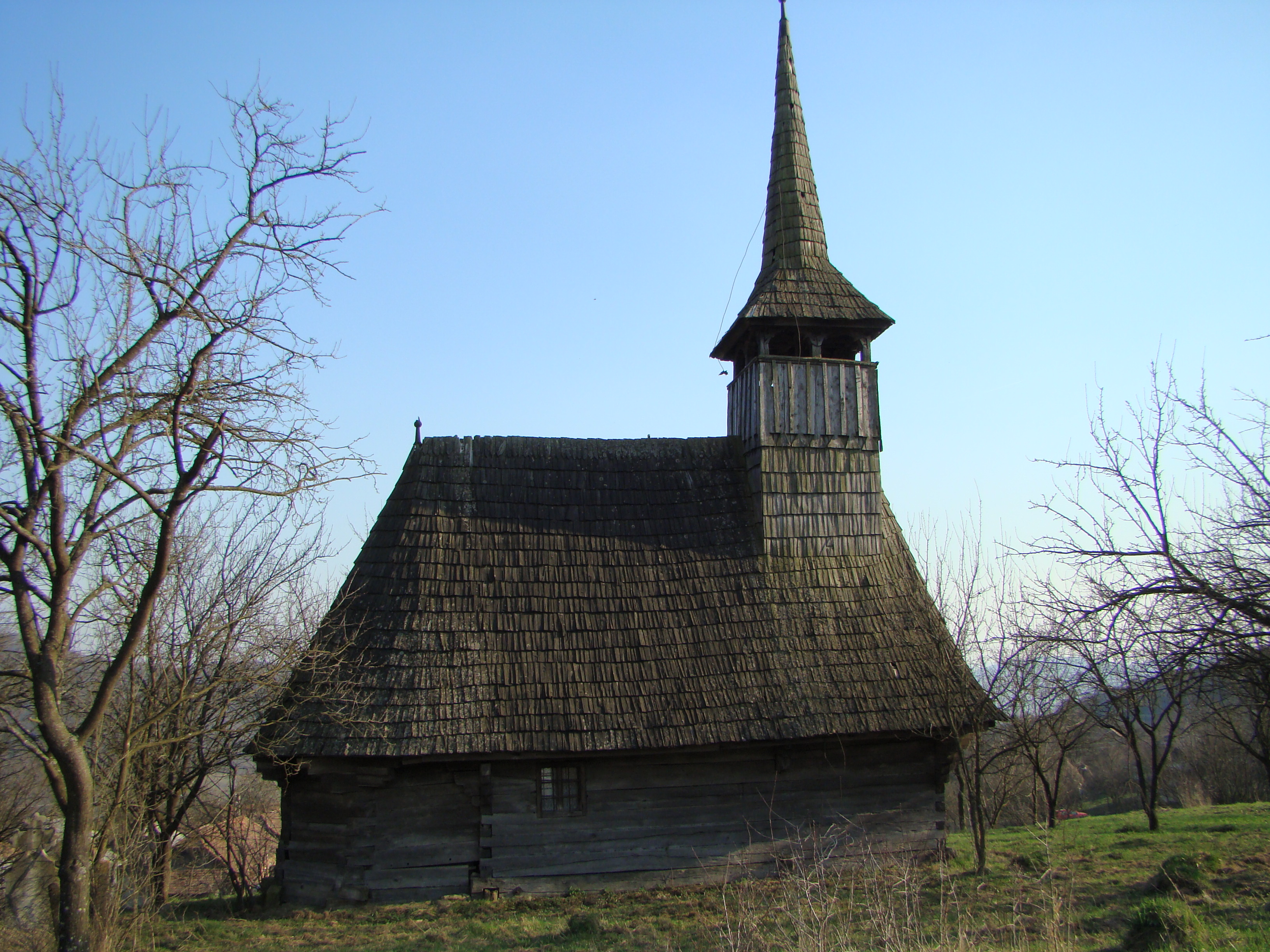
- Wooden church in Muncel

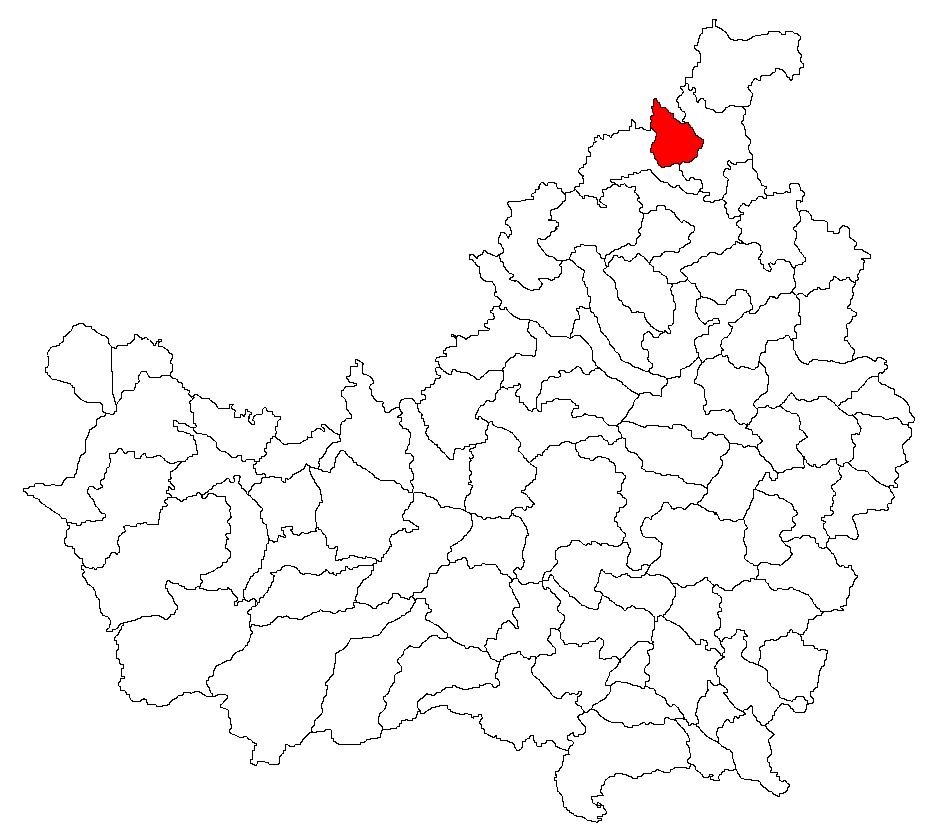
- Location in Cluj County

- Location in Romania
- Coordinates: 47°15′N 23°46′E
- Country: Romania
- County: Cluj
- Established: 1348
- Subdivisions: Câțcău, Muncel, Sălișca

Government
  - Mayor (2020–2024): Călin Mureșan (PNL)
- Area: 37.54 km^{2} (14.49 sq mi)
- Elevation: 252 m (827 ft)
- Population (2021-12-01): 2,251
  - Density: 59.96/km^{2} (155.3/sq mi)
- Time zone: UTC+02:00 (EET)
  - Summer (DST): UTC+03:00 (EEST)
- Postal code: 407180
- Area code: +40 x64
- Vehicle reg.: CJ
- Website: www.primariacatcau.ro

Câțcău (Hungarian: Kackó or Kaczko; German: Katzendorf) is a commune in Cluj County, Transylvania, Romania. It is composed of three villages: Câțcău, Muncel (Kishavas), and Sălișca (Szelecske).

== Geography ==
The commune is located in the northern part of the county, on the border with Sălaj County, 13 km (8.1 mi) northwest of Dej and 67 km (42 mi) north of the county seat, Cluj-Napoca. It lies on the right bank of the river Someș.

Câțcău village is traversed by national road DN1C (part of European route E58), which runs from Cluj-Napoca towards Baia Mare and the border crossing at Halmeu, Satu Mare County, where it connects with the Ukrainian highway M26. The Câțcău train station serves the CFR Line 401, which starts in Cluj-Napoca and ends in Ilva Mică, Bistrița-Năsăud County.

== Demographics ==
Historical population
Year	Pop.	±%
1850	1,806	—
1880	1,865	+3.3%
1890	2,106	+12.9%
1900	2,362	+12.2%
1910	2,467	+4.4%
1920	2,290	−7.2%
1930	2,676	+16.9%
1941	2,905	+8.6%
1956	2,932	+0.9%
1966	2,958	+0.9%
1977	2,934	−0.8%
1992	2,417	−17.6%
2002	2,498	+3.4%
2011	2,100	−15.9%
2021	2,251	+7.2%
Source: Census data

According to the census from 2002 there was a total population of 2,498 people living in this town; of this population, 94.43% were ethnic Romanians, 3.16% were ethnic Hungarians, and 2.28% undeclared. At the 2011 census, there were 2,100 inhabitants; of those, 94.19% were Romanians and 3.67% Hungarians. At the 2021 census, Câțcău had a population of 2,251, of which 94.45% were Romanians and 2.22% Hungarians.
