= Săcuieu =

- Commune
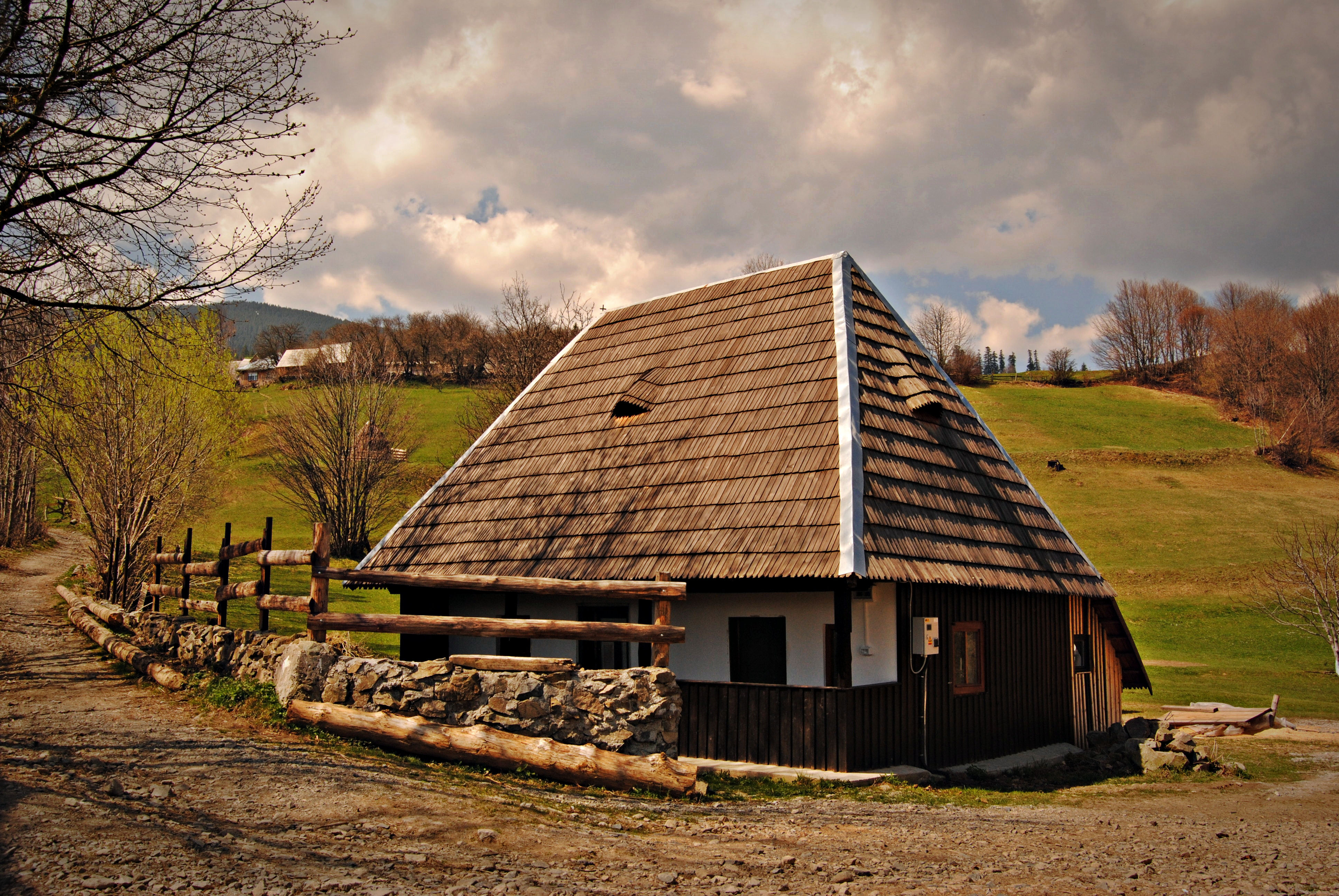
- Rogojel

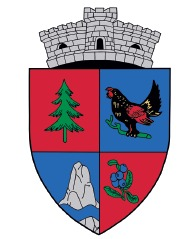
- Coat of arms

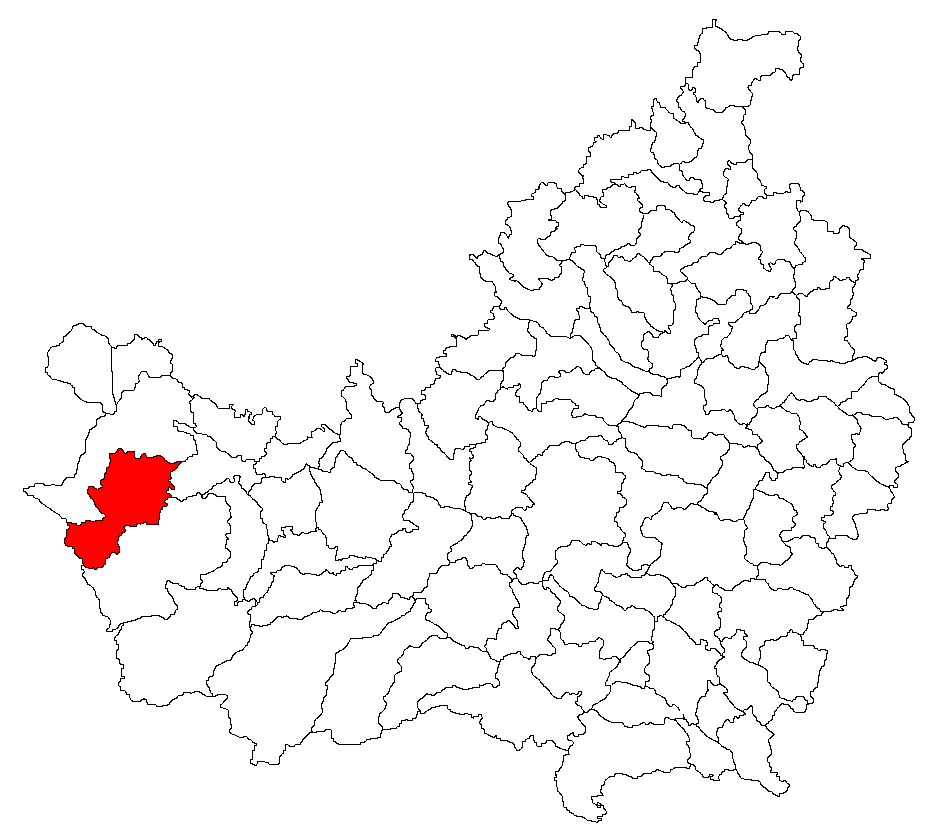
- Location in Cluj County

- Location in Romania
- Coordinates: 46°49′27″N 22°53′16″E
- Country: Romania
- County: Cluj
- Subdivisions: Rogojel, Săcuieu, Vișagu

Government
  - Mayor (2020–2024): Gheorghe Cuc (ALDE)
- Area: 121.14 km^{2} (46.77 sq mi)
- Elevation: 620 m (2,030 ft)
- Population (2021-12-01): 1,369
  - Density: 11.30/km^{2} (29.27/sq mi)
- Time zone: UTC+02:00 (EET)
  - Summer (DST): UTC+03:00 (EEST)
- Postal code: 407495
- Area code: +40 x64
- Vehicle reg.: CJ
- Website: www.primariasacuieu.ro

Săcuieu (Hungarian: Székelyjó) is a commune in Cluj County, Transylvania, Romania. It is composed of three villages: Rogojel (Havasrogoz), Săcuieu, and Vișagu (Viság).

== Geography ==
The commune lies in the northern foothills of the Apuseni Mountains, at an altitude of 620 m (2,030 ft), on the banks of the river Săcuieu. It is situated at the western extremity of Cluj County, in the Țara Călatei historical region of Transylvania, on the border with Bihor County.

Săcuieu is located 14 km (8.7 mi) southwest of the town of Huedin and 65 km (40 mi) west of the county seat, Cluj-Napoca. It is crossed by county road DJ103H, which connects it to Bologa to the north and to Scrind-Frăsinet to the south.

== Demographics ==
According to the census from 2011, there was a total population of 1,441 people living in this commune; of those, 86.81% were ethnic Romanians and 13.04% ethnic Roma. At the 2021 census, Săcuieu had a population of 1,369, of which 72.1% were Romanians and 21.48% Roma.

== Natives ==
- George Potra (1907–1990), teacher and historian
