= Cluj County =

County of Romania

Cluj County Județul Cluj (Romanian)
- County
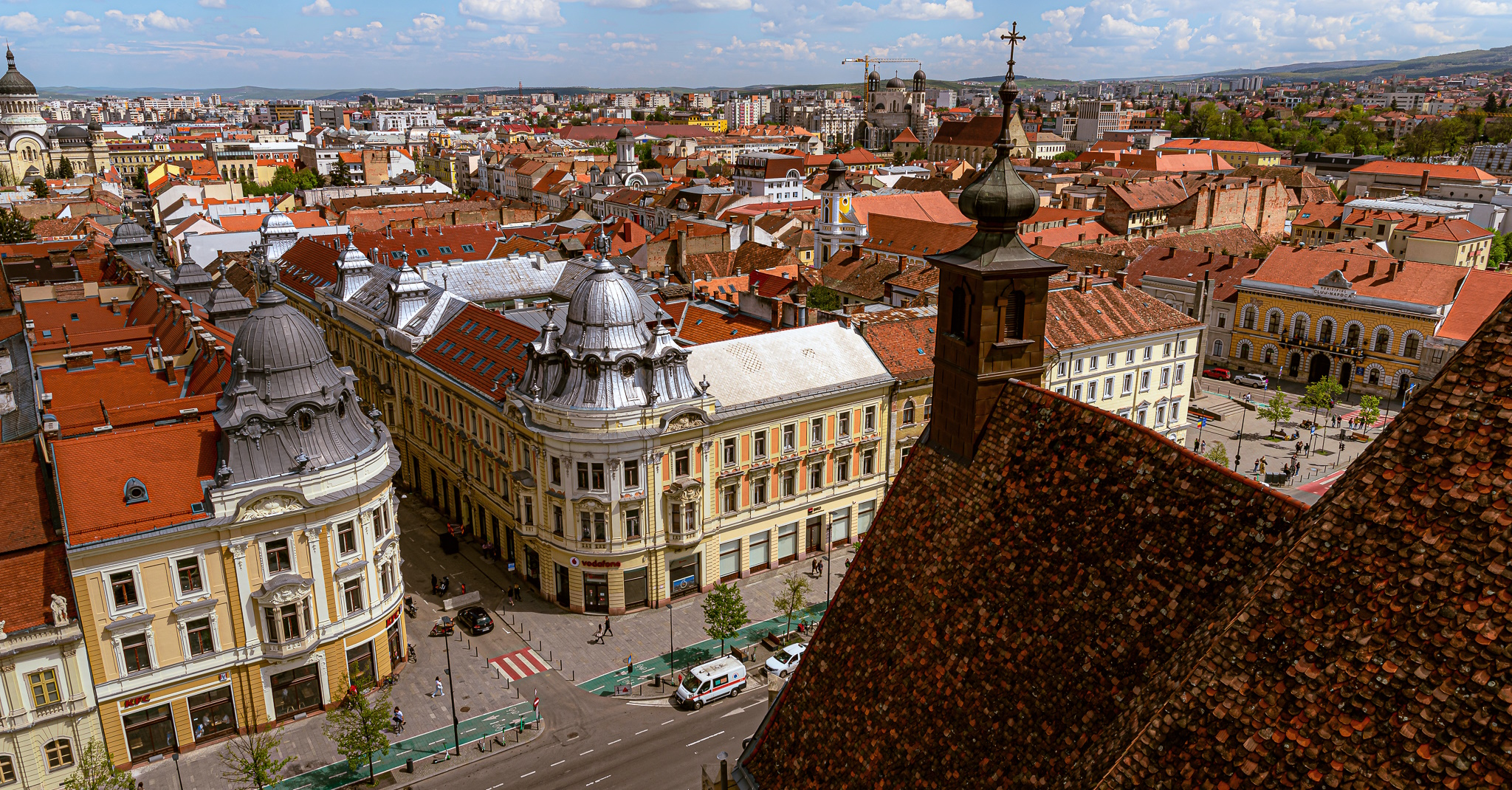
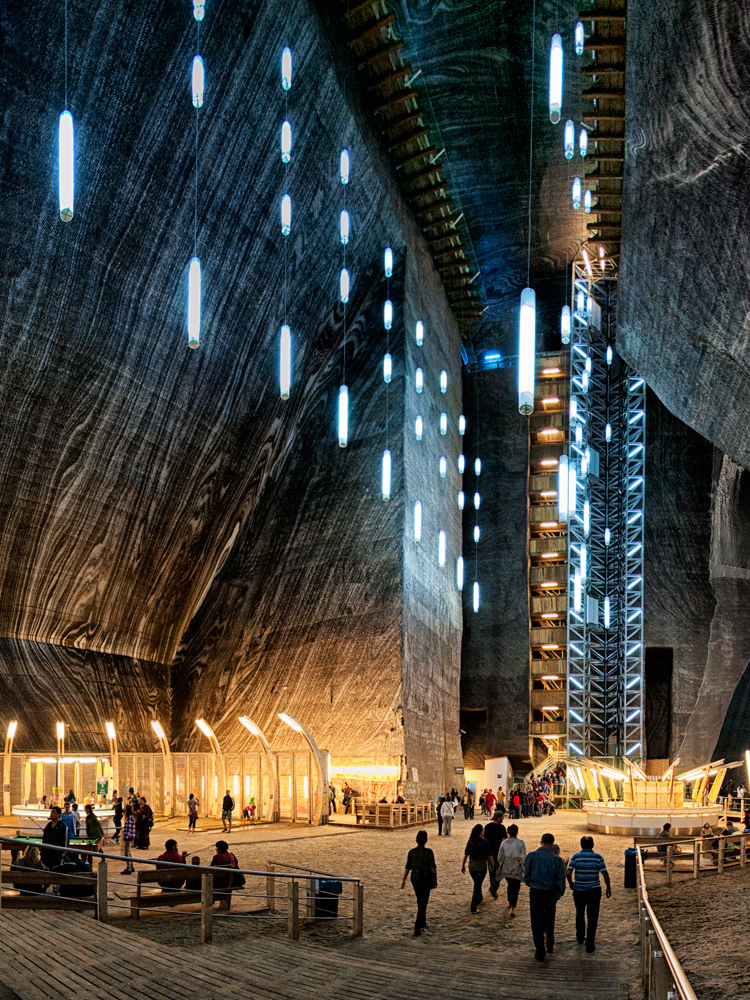
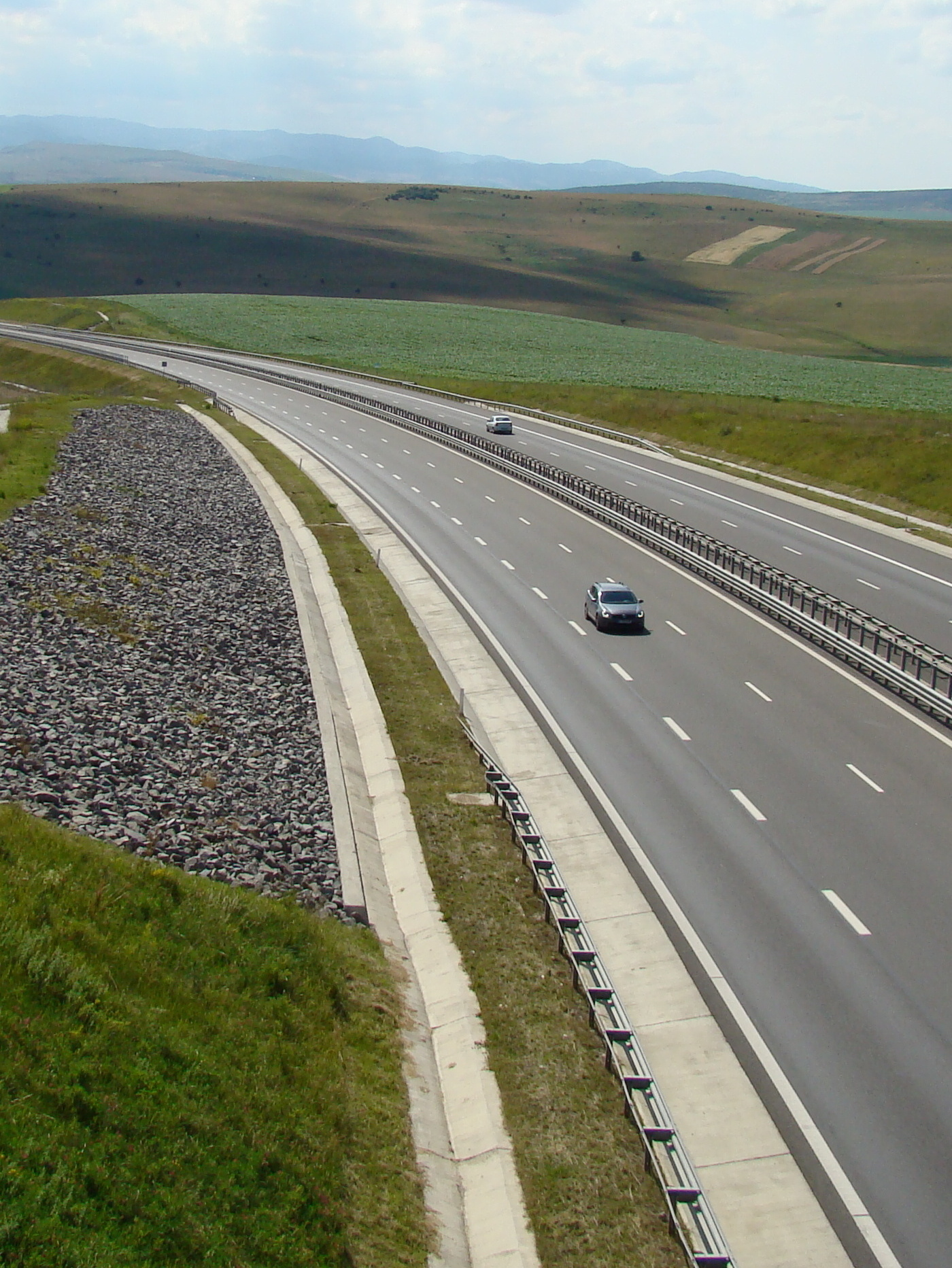
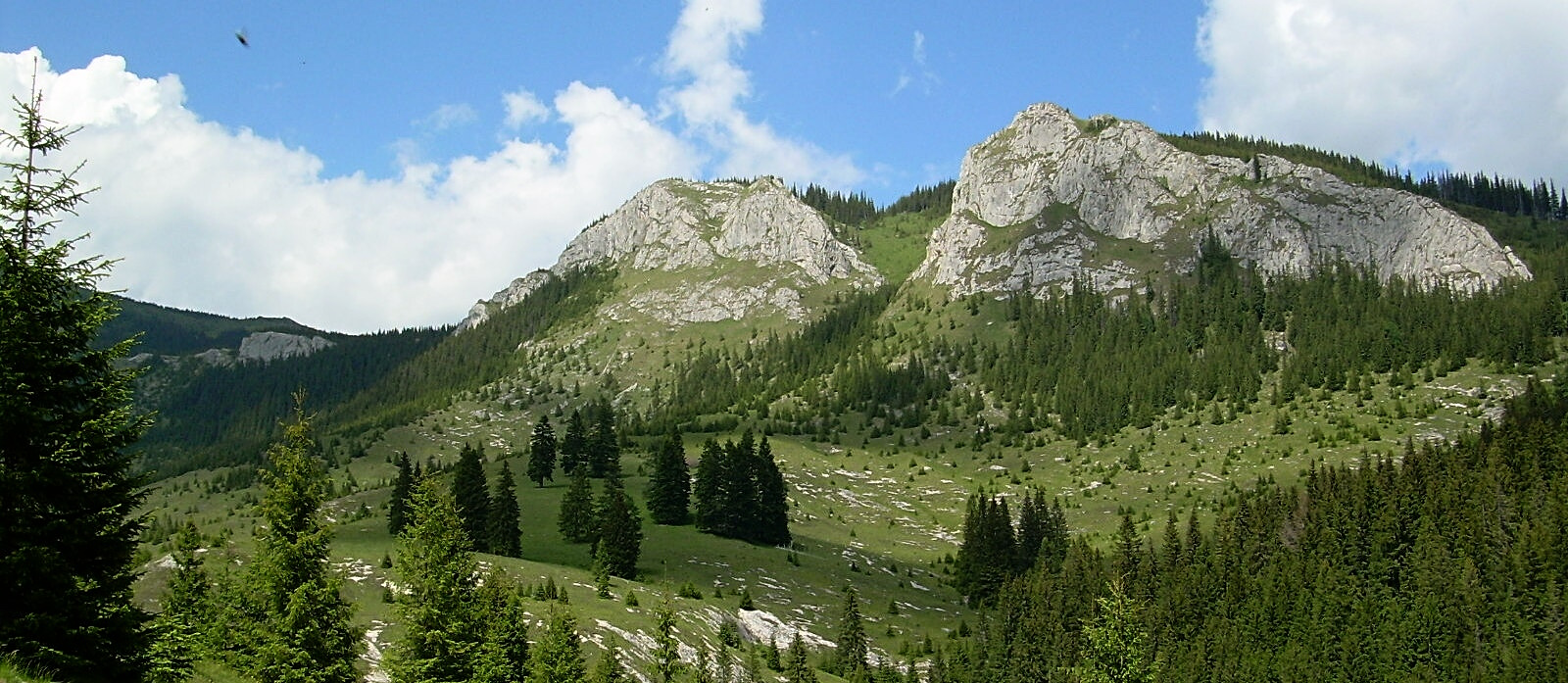
- Cluj-Napoca Salina Turda A3 Motorway Pietrele Albe, Apuseni Mountains

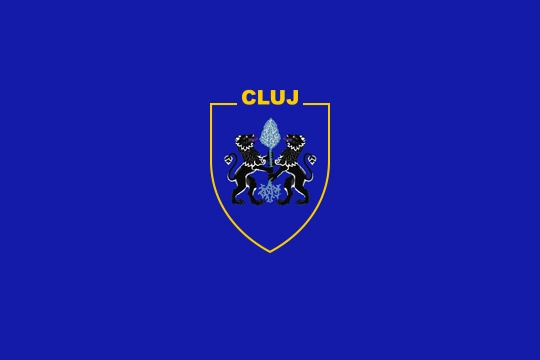
- Flag Coat of arms

- Location within Romania
- Coordinates: 46°43′N 23°32′E
- Country: Romania
- Historical region: Transylvania
- Development region: Nord-Vest
- Capital: Cluj-Napoca

Government
  - Type: County Council
  - President of the County Council: Alin Tișe (PNL)
  - Prefect: Irina Munteanu

Area
  - Total: 6,674 km^{2} (2,577 sq mi)
  - Rank: 12th

Population (2021-12-01)
  - Total: 679,141
  - Rank: 4th
  - Density: 101.8/km^{2} (263.6/sq mi)
- Demonym(s): Clujean (male); Clujeancă (female)
- Time zone: UTC+2 (EET)
  - Summer (DST): UTC+3 (EEST)
- Postal code: 40wxyz^{1}
- Area code: +40 x64^{2}
- Car plate: CJ^{3}
- GDP nominal: US$22.001 billion (2025)
- GDP/capita: US$32,395 (2025)
- Website: County Council; County Prefecture

Cluj County (Romanian pronunciation: [kluʒ]) is a county (județ) of Romania, in Transylvania. Its seat is Cluj-Napoca.

== Name ==
In Hungarian it is known as Kolozs megye. Under the Kingdom of Hungary, a county with an identical name (Kolozs County, Romanian: Comitatul Cluj) existed since the 11th century.

== Geography ==

Cluj County lies in the northwestern half of the country, between parallels 47°28' in north and 46°24' in south, meridians 23°39' in west and 24°13' in east, respectively. It covers an area of 6,674 km^{2} (2,577 sq mi) unfolded in the contact zone of three representative natural units: the Apuseni Mountains, the Someș Plateau, and the Transylvanian Plain. Cluj County is the 12th largest in the country and occupies 2.8% of Romania's area. It is bordered to the northeast with Maramureș and Bistrița-Năsăud counties, to the east with Mureș County, to the south with Alba County, and to the west with Bihor and Sălaj counties.

=== Neighbours ===
- Maramureș County and Bistrița-Năsăud County in the Northeast.
- Mureș County in the East.
- Alba County in the South.
- Bihor County and Sălaj County in the West.

=== Relief ===
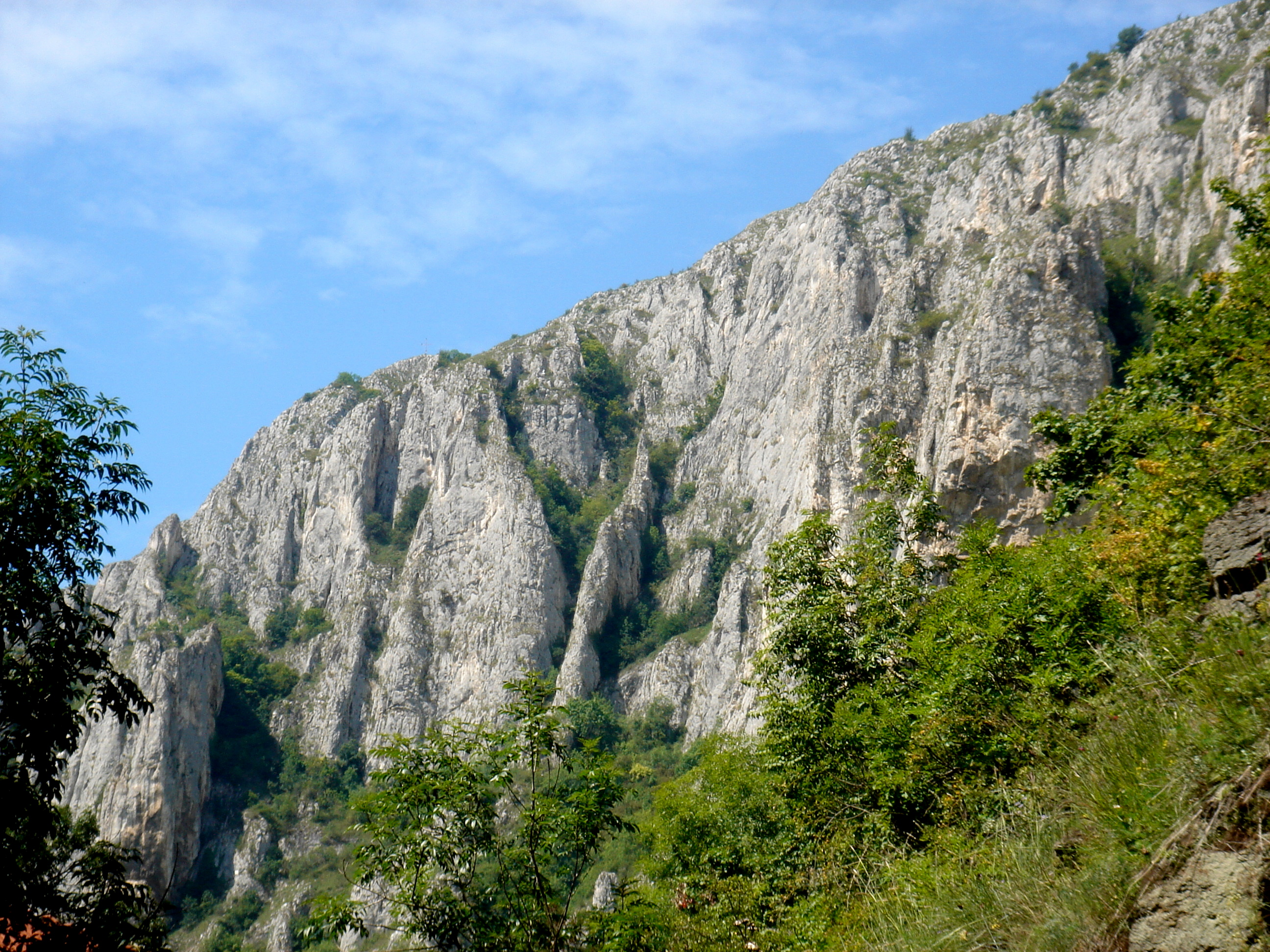
Turda Gorge

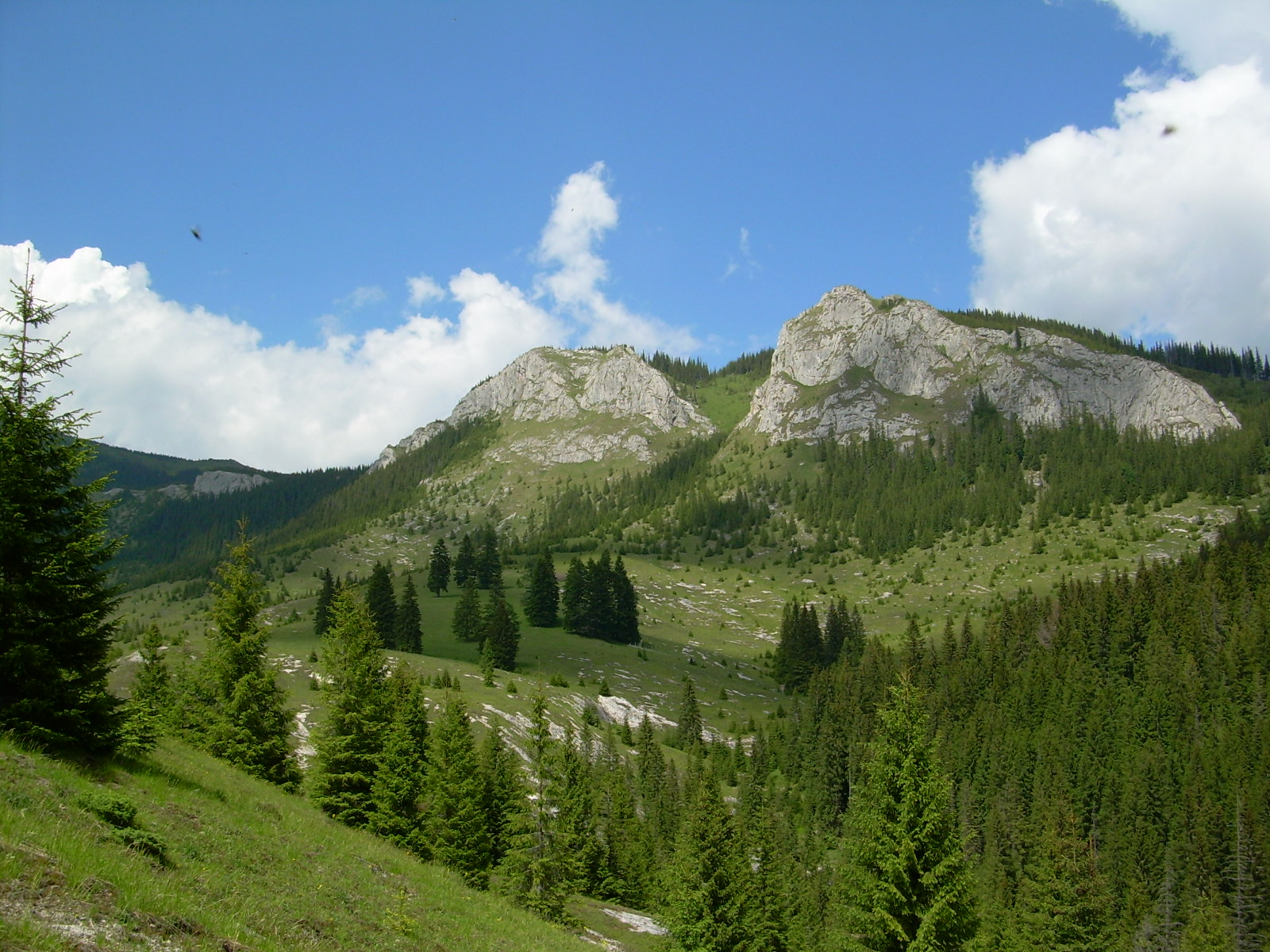
Pietrele Albe, Vlădeasa Massif

The relief is rugged, constituted mostly of hilly units belonging to Someș Plateau and, to a lesser extent, of mountain portions that represent the northeastern part of Apuseni Mountains. Fields are missing on the territory of Cluj County, being replaced, as step of relief, by well-developed terraces and floodplains in the lower sectors of the Someșul Mic and Arieș rivers. The hilly area, extended in the central northern and southern part of the county, include several subunits of the Someș Plateau (Cluj, Feleacu, Dej hills), among which are individualized numerous depressions (Apahida, Bonțida, Gilău, Dej, Turda, Câmpia Turzii), at the edge of which there are some contact depressions (Huedin and Iara), at the limit of the mountain. The mountain sector, located in the southwest, belongs to the Apuseni Mountains, a mountain group of the Western Carpathians, represented by sectors of Vlădeasa Massif (peak Vlădeasa – 1,836 m), Gilău Mountains, and Muntele Mare, as well as narrow portions of Trascău, Plopiș, Meseș, and Bihor mountains. In the eastern part of Cluj County, east of the river alignment Valea Florilor–Maraloiu–Someșul Mic, is located a part of the Transylvanian Plain, a special unit of relief, with mountainous character, partially overlapped by some gas-condensate domes.

=== Hydrographic network ===
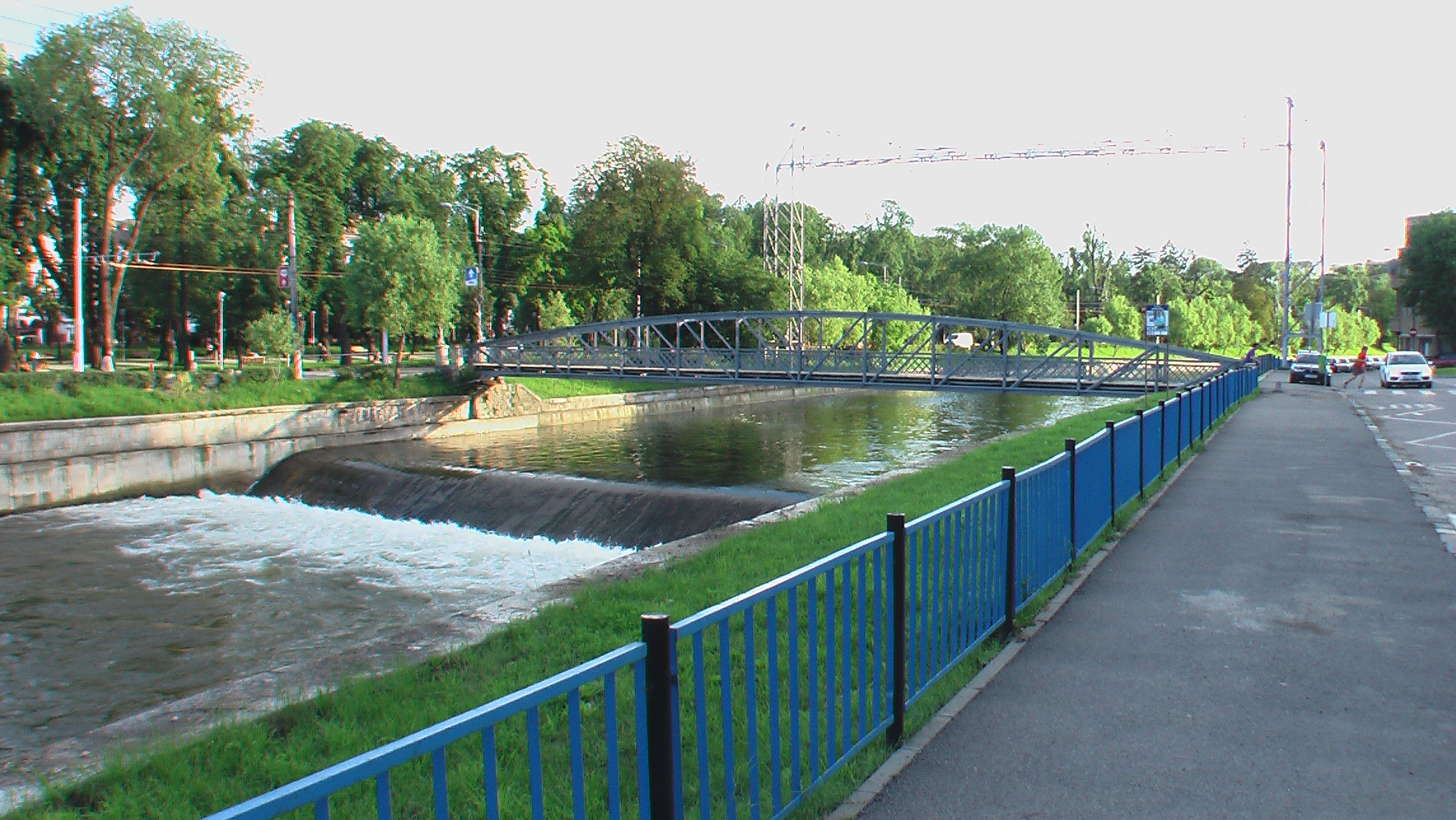
Someșul Mic in Cluj-Napoca

The hydrographic network is represented by rivers (Someșul Mic with SW–NE direction, whose catchment area is fully developed on the territory of Cluj County, Crișul Repede, and lower Arieș), natural lakes and ponds (Cătina Popii I and II, Geaca, Țaga, etc.) and lakes of hydropower interest (Beliș-Fântânele, Tarnița and Gilău). In the northeastern part of Cluj County, Someșul Mic joins Someșul Mare, upstream of Dej, forming the Someș, which flows into the Tisza to the west.

The deep waters are less represented and are characterized by high mineralization. Relatively rich mineral springs, with sulphates, calcium and sodium chloride, can be found in Dezmir, Cojocna, Gădălin, Sic, Gherla, Leghia, Someșeni, Turda, etc.

=== Climate ===
Cluj-Napoca

Climate chart (precipitation, max. and min. temperature)
| J | F | M | A | M | J | J | A | S | O | N | D |
| 27 1 −5 | 25 4 −4 | 35 10 0 | 51 17 5 | 71 21 9 | 91 25 13 | 87 27 14 | 65 27 14 | 56 22 10 | 45 16 5 | 34 8 1 | 34 2 −4 |
- █ Average max. and min. temperatures in °C
- █ Precipitation totals in mm
Imperial conversion
| J | F | M | A | M | J | J | A | S | O | N | D |
| 1.1 34 23 | 1 39 25 | 1.4 50 32 | 2 62 40 | 2.8 71 48 | 3.6 77 55 | 3.4 80 58 | 2.5 81 57 | 2.2 71 49 | 1.8 60 41 | 1.3 47 33 | 1.3 35 26 |
- █ Average max. and min. temperatures in °F
- █ Precipitation totals in inches

Through its location, Cluj County benefits from a moderate continental climate. In the mountain sector (Vlădeasa Massif and Muntele Mare), the mean annual air temperature is 2 °C, and in the rest of the territory is 6 °C. Annual thermal amplitudes have values between 17 and 19 °C in the mountains and grow at 23–25 °C in hilly areas, plateaus and plains.

Rainfall is distributed unevenly, with minimal amounts in Turda–Câmpia Turzii (about 550 mm) and maximum in the Vlădeasa Massif (about 1,400 mm). On average, annual values of rainfall reach 600–650 mm in the Transylvania Plain, 650–700 mm in the Someș Plateau and over 900–1000 mm in mountainous areas.

=== Natural resources ===
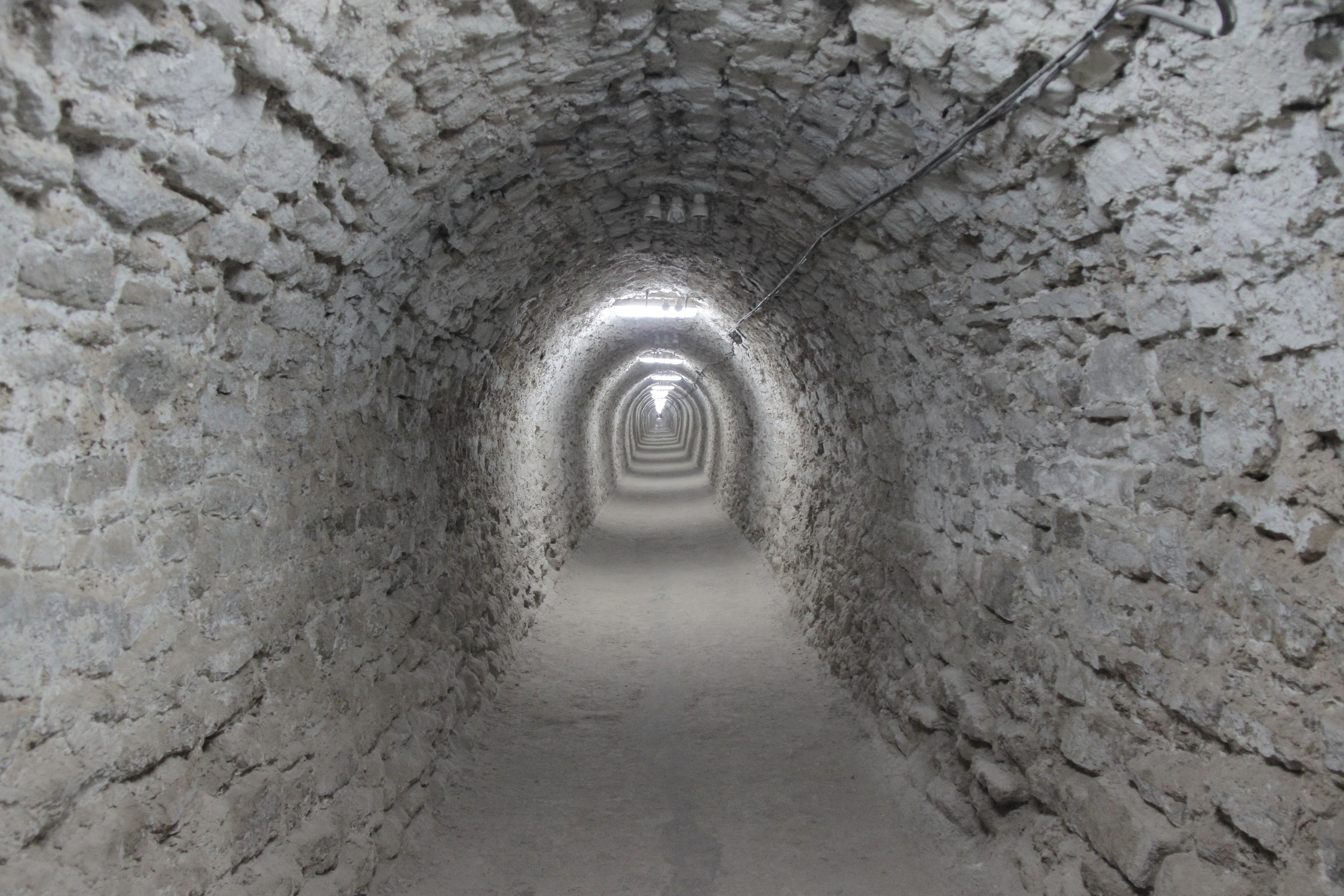
Access tunnel in Turda salt mine. The geological reserve is estimated at 38,750 million tonnes of salt.

Cluj County has rich and varied natural resources. Iron ores came into use in 1962, by exploitations in Căpușu Mic and Băișoara, being conducted over the years a series of geological explorations in Vlaha, Săvădisla and Cacova Ierii. Fossil fuels are represented by brown coal exploited in Ticu–Dâncu–Băgara area and peat, exploited in Călățele–Căpățâna sector. Likewise, there is a gas-condensed dome in Puini in the Transylvanian Plain.

Besides iron ore and mineral fuels, there is a variety of useful minerals and rocks, including: quartz in Muntele Mare and around Someșul Rece (where can also be found feldspar), dacites and andesites in Vlădeasa Massif and around Morlaca, Bologa, Poieni, Săcuieu, Stolna, and Iara, granites in Muntele Mare, limestones and dolomites used to fabricate binders (lime, cement), exploited in Săndulești, Tureni, Surduc, Buru, Poieni, etc., calcareous tuffs of high quality with quarries at Tioc–Cornești, kaolin sands at Popești, Topa, Băgara, Gârbău, etc., salt, with significant reserves at Ocna Dejului, Turda, Cojocna, Sic, Nireș, gravel pits on Someșul Mic at Gilău, Florești and on the lower Arieș.

=== Vegetation ===
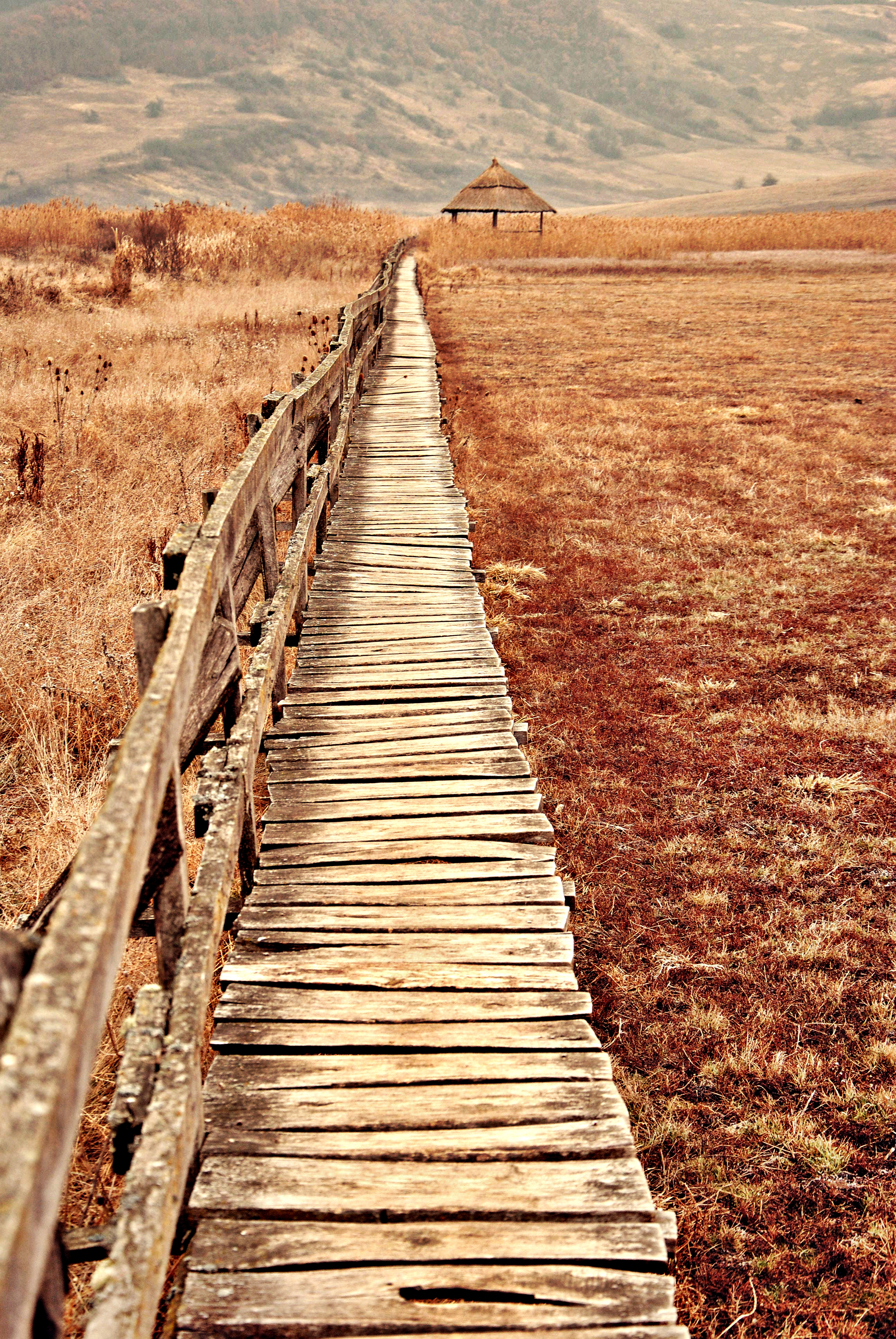
Thickets of Sic

The vegetation is heterogeneous and storeyed due to the prevalence of hilly and mountainous relief. A wide range of plant formations can be met in Cluj County. Sub-alpine floor, present in Vlădeasa Massif and Muntele Mare, is characterized by lawns with midget grasses and juniper bushes. The spruce forests floor, expanded on mountain slopes between 1,000 m (3,300 ft) and 1,600 m (5,200 ft), consists predominantly of spruce mixed with fir, and the deciduous forests floor develops on all forms of relief, ranging from 400 to 1,000 m, and consists of sessile forests mixed with beech, hornbeam, or elm. On slopes with northern exposure of the Lonea and Lujerdiu valleys there develop compact clusters of sessile, hornbeam, ash and elm forests. In the hilly Transylvanian Plain there appear islands of steppe, alternating with patches of forests.

=== Fauna ===
The fauna is adapted to vegetation flooring, but less constant to its limits, due to great mobility; it is rich in species. In forests are present numerous animals of cynegetic interest, including deer, stag, bear, fox, lynx, wild boar, squirrel, and on Someș Valley naturally entered the muskrat. Around artificial lakes live a series of birds (duck, coot, stork), in the Someș Plateau and Transylvanian Plain was colonized the pheasant, and in Turda Gorge area lives the rock eagle. Mountain rivers are populated with trouts, graylings and nases, and in the lower ones with barbel and chub.

== Economy ==
Cluj has, after Bucharest, the largest number of companies in the country (over 32,000 firms in 2014) and ranks third in net average earnings, with 1,890 lei in December 2013 (Bucharest has 2,474 lei, and Ilfov 2,138 lei); it is almost 5% higher than the national average. Great investors in the automotive industry, but also in IT have increased the average salary of employees, but these wage increases have led to an increase in the cost of living, reflected, for example, through higher rents than in surrounding counties. Over 150,000 people work in Cluj companies, and after their turnover, the county ranks fifth in the Romanian business hierarchy, with €8 billion in 2012, after Bucharest (€81.9 billion), Ilfov (€13.6 billion), Argeș (€9.1 billion) and Timiș (€8.7 billion). The number of registered unemployed at the end of June 2014 was 9,744 people, and the unemployment rate, calculated on the working population, is 2.8%, being 0.6% lower than the unemployment rate in June 2013. In 2015, GDP per capita is +30% more than the national average.

Cluj County is the county with the most industrial parks in Romania. Five such functional areas and another in preparation already attracted investment of over half a billion euros and led to the creation of over 5,000 jobs.

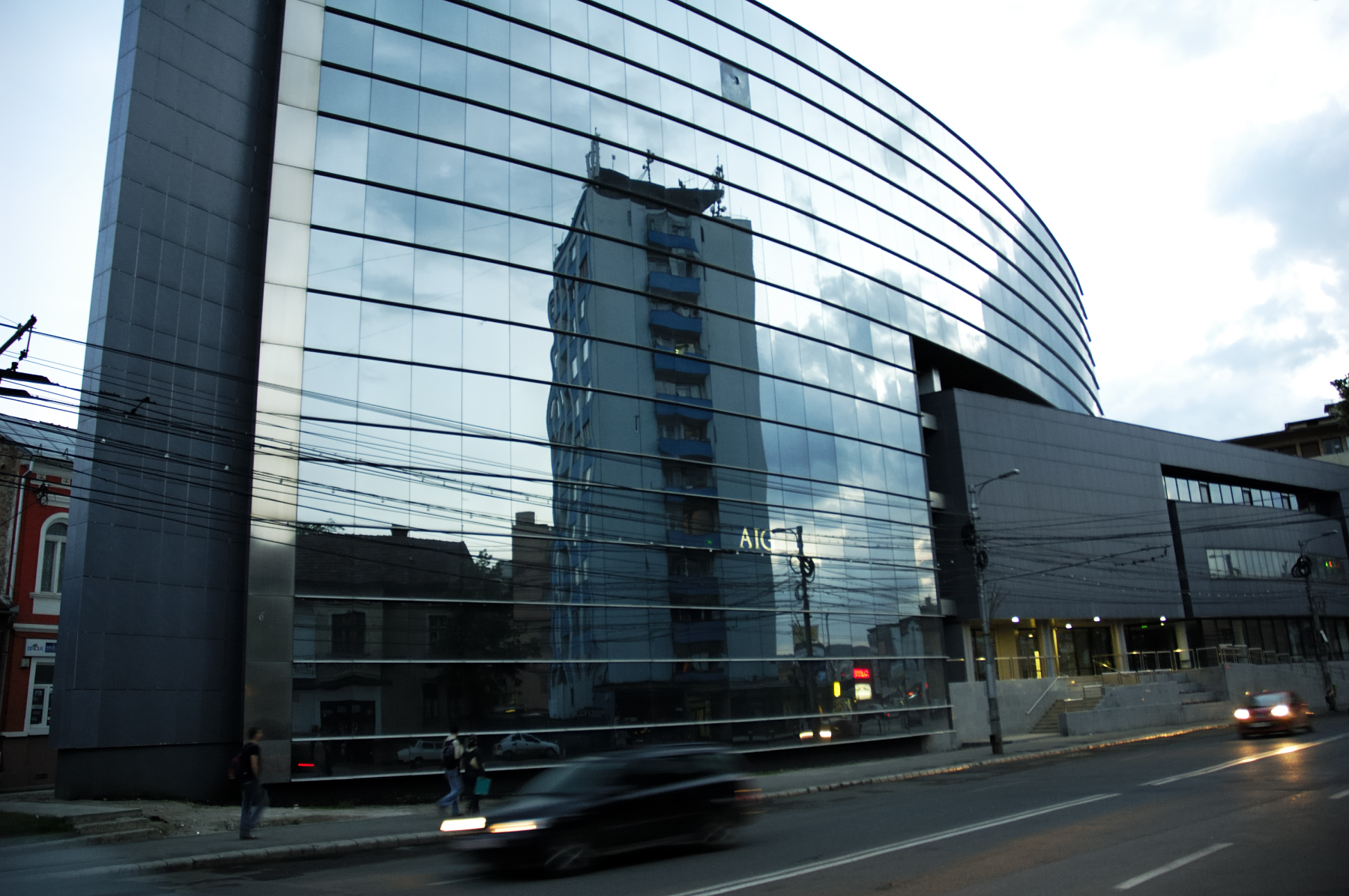
Office building in central Cluj-Napoca

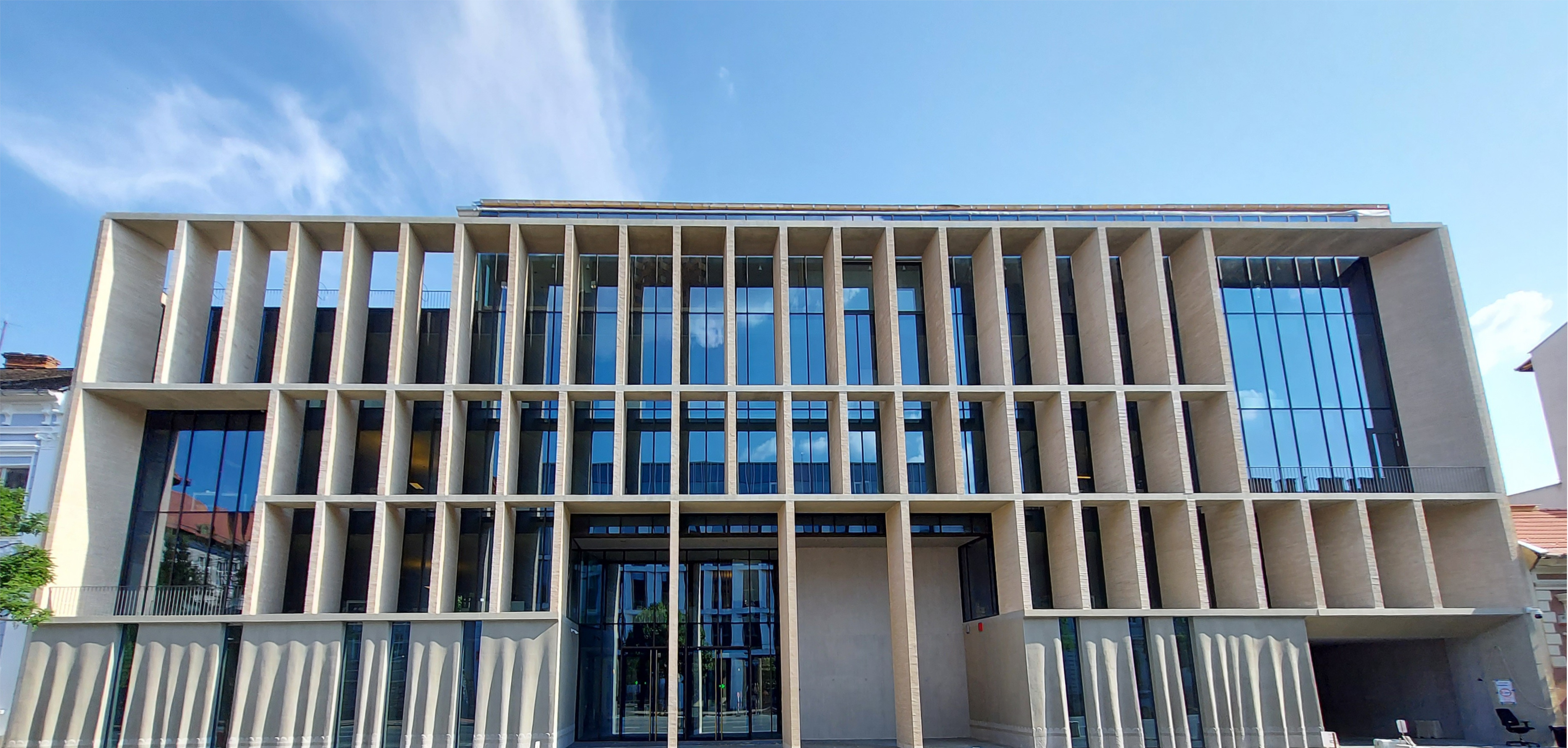
Banca Transilvania (right) and Romanian Commercial Bank's regional headquarters (left)

In June 2014 industrial production increased by 19.6% over the same month in 2013, according to data released by the County Directorate of Statistics. Compared with the first half of 2013, between 1 January and 30 June 2014 the industrial production index was 122.3%. The turnover value index in industry in June 2014 was 11.7% higher than in June 2013. Cumulated six months, the turnover value index is 112.5% compared to the same period in 2013. The largest new investment in the domain was carried out in public industrial parks (Tetarom II and III, with Emerson in Muncii Blvd. and Bosch and De'Longhi in Jucu) or private ones in Dej and Câmpia Turzii.

Therewith, the industry in Cluj County is characterized by a strong potential for processing both local resources and those attracted. Within processing industry are represented most existing branches nationwide. Over 24% of the employed population is working in different industrial sub-branches. Likewise, an important sector of Cluj County economy is the IT sector and that related to customer service – services of sales, marketing, services of IT helpdesk, technical support, that record an annual increase of over 30% in the number of employees. The industrial production in the county is intended to cover the domestic demand and supply to foreign partners. Among processing industries, those with the highest share in industrial production are non-ferrous metal industry (17.9%), food and beverage industry (17.5%), metallurgic industry (12.9%), chemicals and man-made fibers industry (8.1%), cellulose, paper and cardboard industry (8%).

Regarding foreign trade, compared to the same period in 2013, exports increased by 8.3%, but imports grew more strongly: plus 14.4%. More precisely, foreign trade in Cluj County, between 1 January and 30 April, is focused on achieving an export volume worth €315.7 million and imports totaling €598 million. Among the products supplied for export can be mentioned: paper and cardboard; articles of paper pulp, paper or cardboard; clothing items and accessories; footwear and similar articles; products of cast iron, iron and steel; boilers, machinery and mechanical appliances; machinery and electrical equipment and parts thereof; optical, photographic and cinematographic instruments; pharmaceuticals; glass and glassware; furniture. Were imported in large quantities: coffee and tea; fuel, mineral oils and products of distillation; organic chemicals; fertilizers; hides; paper and cardboard; products of cast iron, iron and steel; boilers, machinery and mechanical appliances; machinery and electrical equipment and parts thereof; vehicles, other than railway rolling stock; silk; cotton; man-made fibers; furniture.

=== Agriculture ===
Concerning agriculture and silviculture, varying climatic conditions of the area have created a favorable environment for the development of agriculture, this being the second branch, as share and importance, in the economy of the county. An important role in this economic sector holds zootechnics, but crop production has also a significant share. Both the vegetal and animal sectors undergo a period of transition characterized by reduced production from year to year, a situation that requires the adoption of measures to stimulate the recovery of agriculture. The importance of agriculture lies in the existence of the University of Agricultural Sciences and Veterinary Medicine that annually licenses more than 2,000 graduates, specialists in all fields of agriculture.

=== Tourism ===
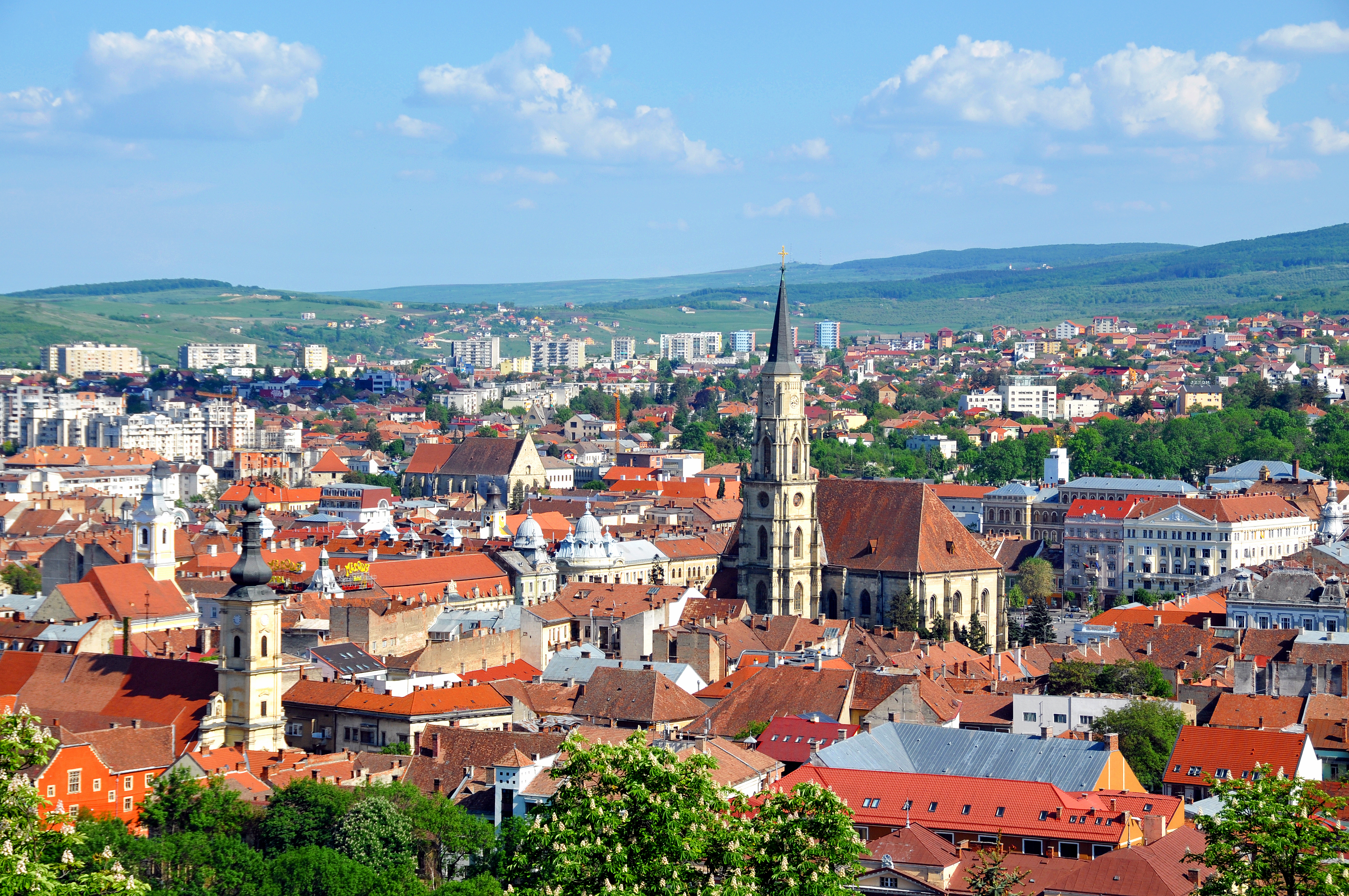
Cluj-Napoca, the county seat of Cluj County, is a popular tourist destination locally and nationally.

There are several tourist destinations in Cluj County, such as, most notably, its county seat, Cluj-Napoca, the Apuseni Mountains, castles, fortresses, and churches.

== Transport ==
=== Rail network ===
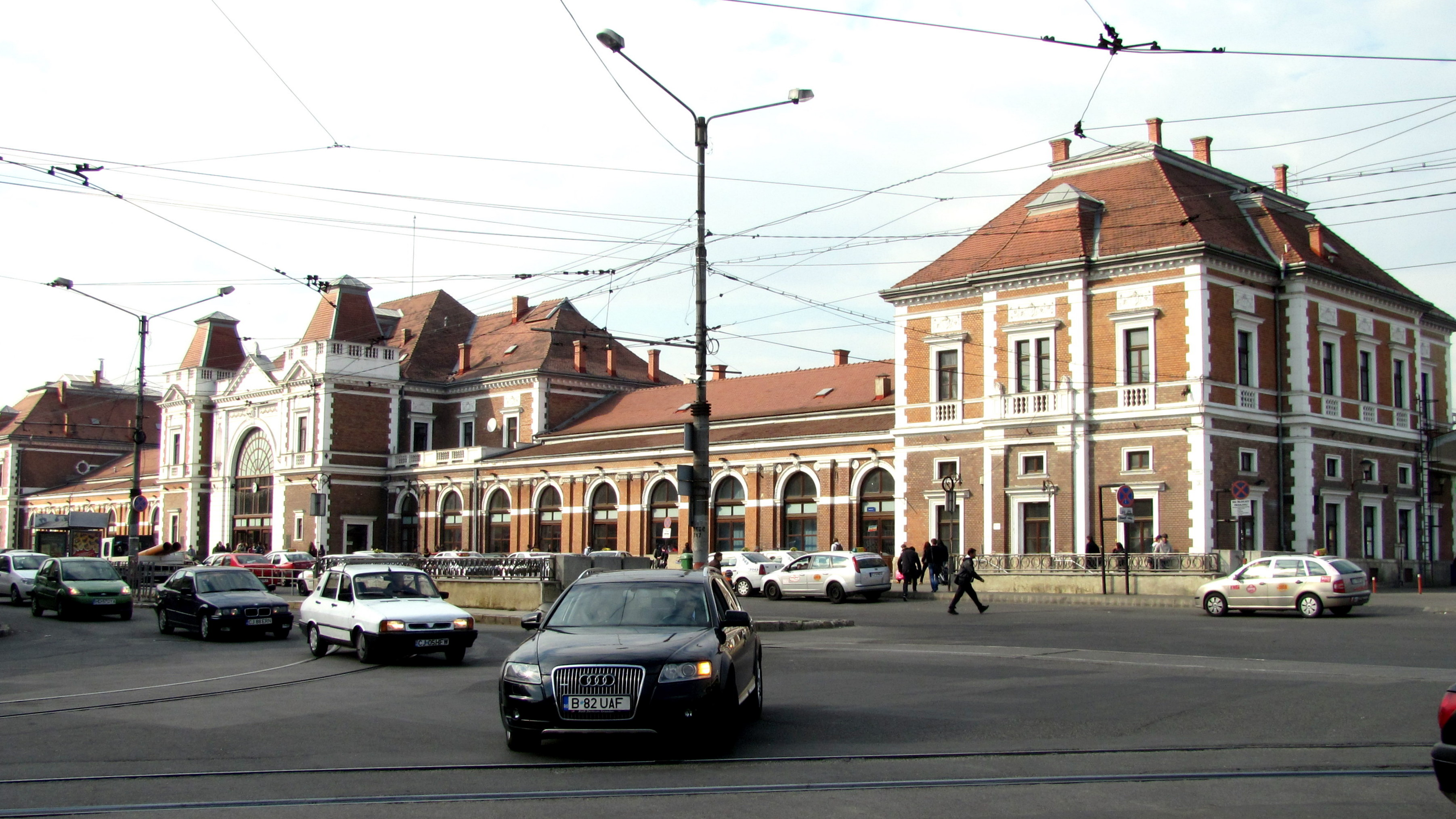
Cluj-Napoca train station is one of the largest and throughput in northwestern Romania.

At the county level, double railway lines have a share of 70%, being the highest in the Nord-Vest development region, and the degree of electrification is over 50% of existing railway lines. Regarding the transportation of goods, receiving stations at the county level occupy leading positions at a regional level: Dej, Câmpia Turzii, Turda, Aghireșu, Gherla and Cluj-Napoca. The length of railways that cross the county is 240 km, of which 129 km electrified line. Through Câmpia Turzii, Cluj-Napoca and Huedin passes CFR Line 300 Bucharest–Oradea that links with the countries of Central and Western Europe. One of the major railway junctions of the country is Dej, being connected with important centers in the northern part of the country on routes: Dej–Baia Mare–Satu Mare, Dej–Beclean–Ilva Mică, Dej–Salva–Sighetu Marmației, Dej–Beclean–Deda.

=== Road network ===
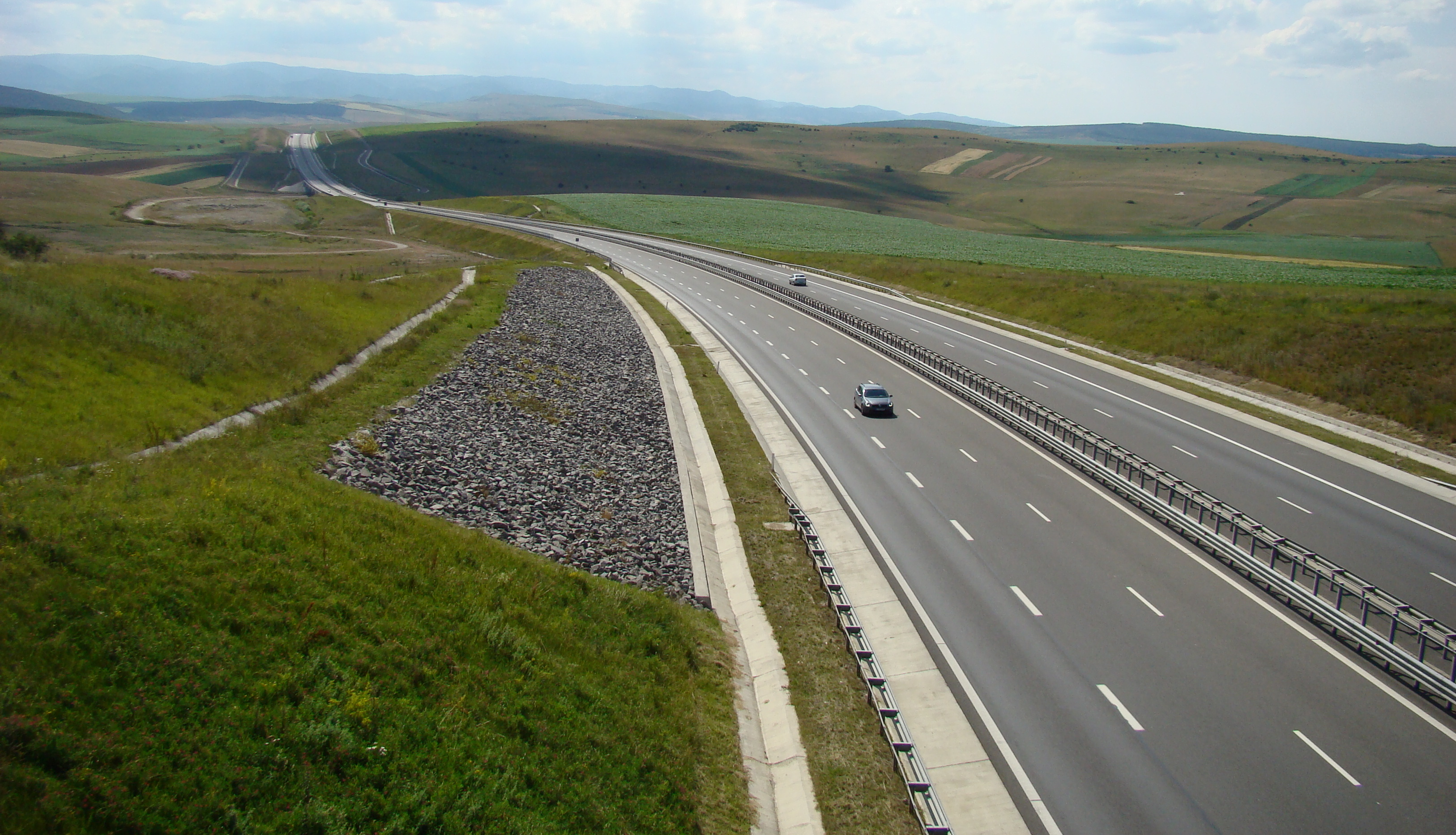
A3 motorway, also known as Transylvania Motorway, near Turda

In 2010, Cluj County recorded a road network density of 0.4 km of road/km^{2}. This level places Cluj above the national average (0.33 km of road/km^{2}). Cluj County has a dense network of public roads, with a total length of 2,699 km, of which 502 km are national roads. Out of the total, 698 km are modernized roads, in majority portions of roads of national and international interest. Inland, connections are provided by 2,197 km of county and communal roads, of which 255 km are modernized, and 720 km are covered with light road surfaces. In December 2009 were opened the first 42 km of A3 motorway, between Turda and Cluj West, and in November 2010, another 12 km between Turda and Câmpia Turzii. Were put into use bypasses for Cluj-Napoca, Apahida and Gherla. Likewise, were also modernized several mountain and forest roads.

Cluj-Napoca has a well-developed market for taxi services. There are also several car rental companies, including local operators such as inchirieri auto Cluj"Pont Rent a Car". and inchirieri auto Cluj."Autoconnect". Alternatively, short- and long-distance carpooling platforms operate in Cluj, such as Uber, Bolt or BlaBlaCar.

=== Airports ===
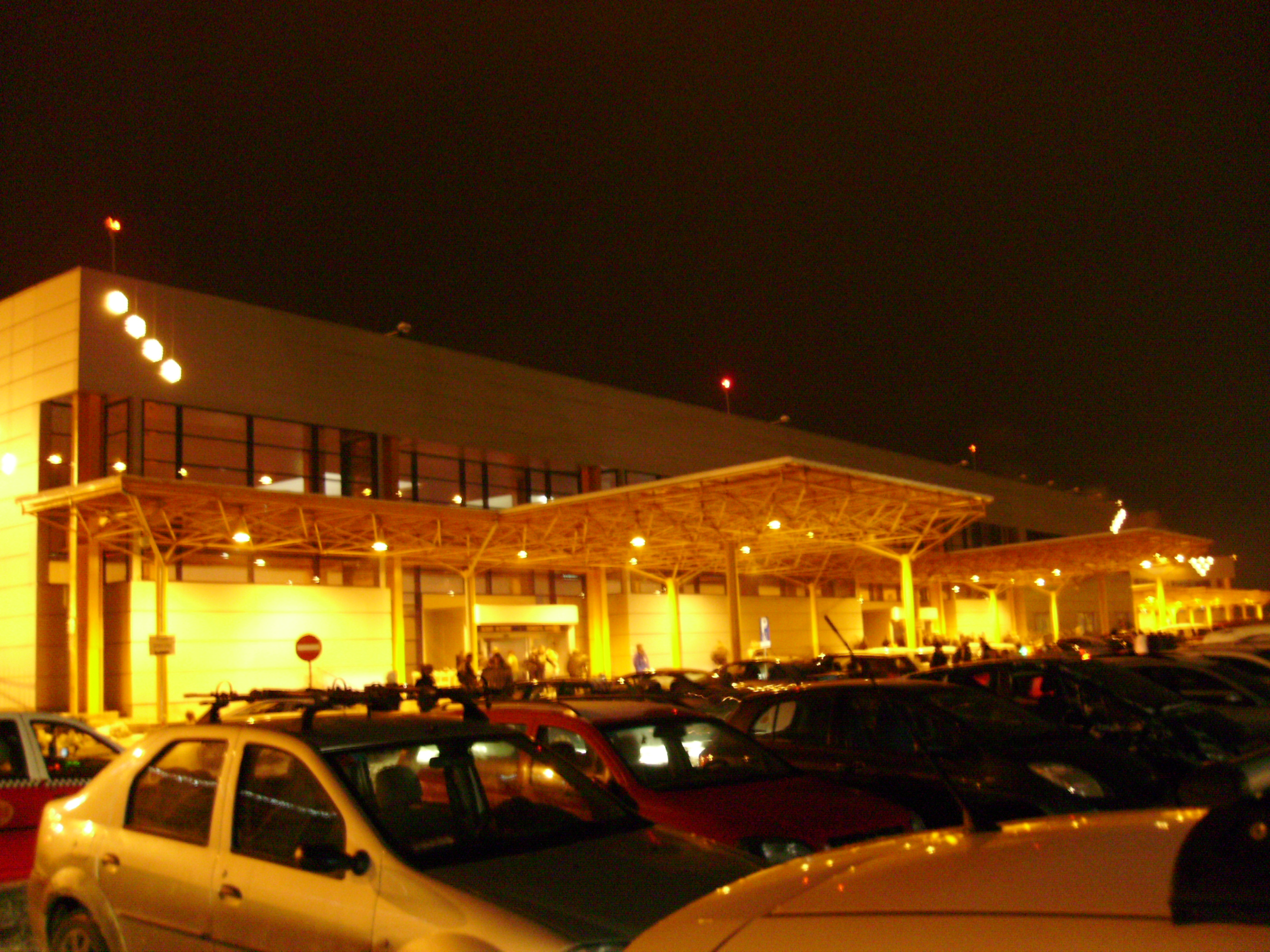
Avram Iancu International Airport is the second largest in Romania.

Avram Iancu International Airport, is the second-largest airport in Romania, handling 1,182,047 passengers in 2014. The airport is located in Someșeni and serves Cluj-Napoca. It operates passenger flights and international cargo flights. The airport has been continuously expanded and modernized. The new terminal built in 2009, with a capacity of 1.5 million passengers per year, is intended for both domestic flights and foreign ones. The terminal has international standard facilities.

== Education ==
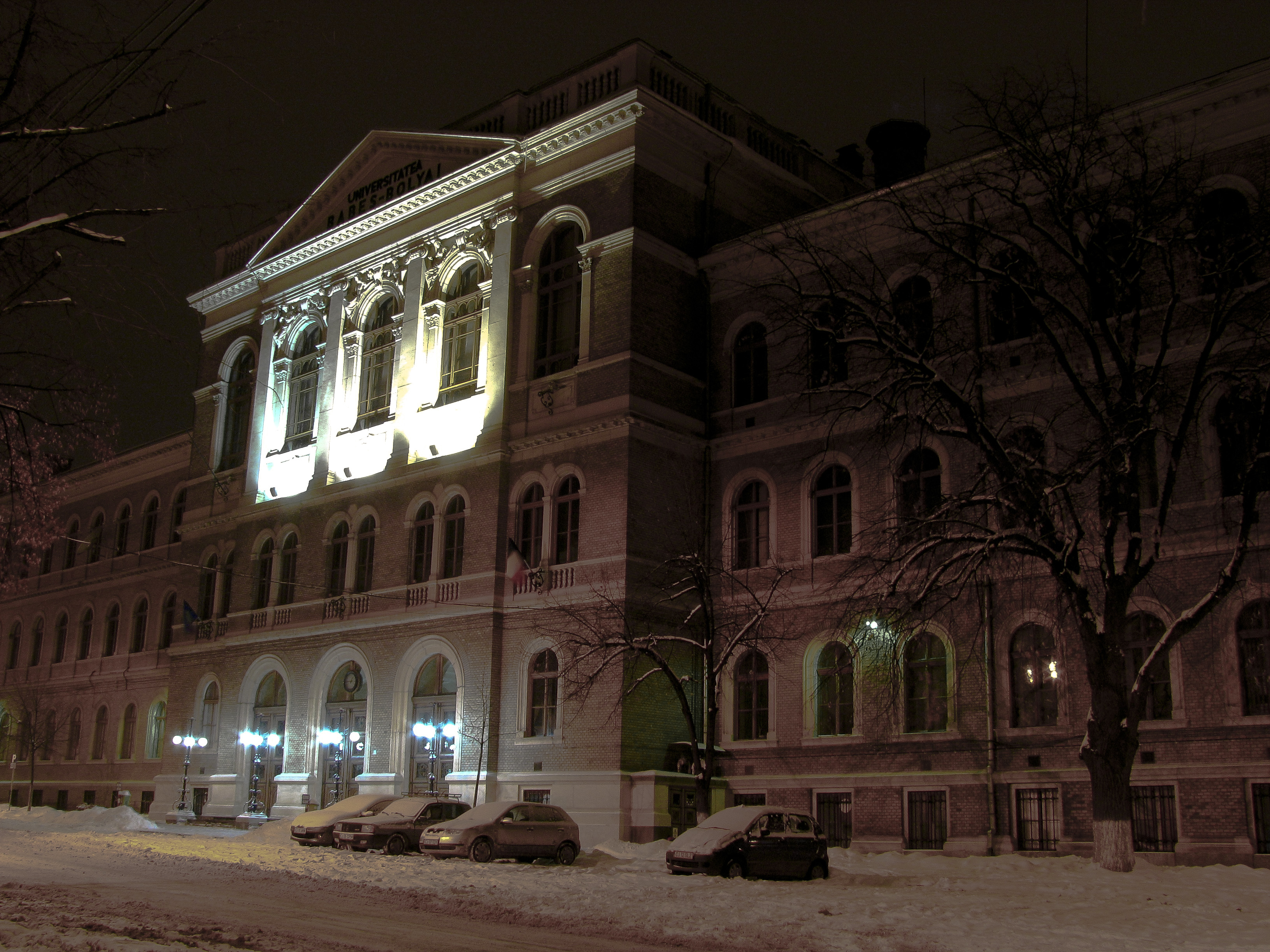
With more than 41,000 students in 2014, Babeș-Bolyai University is the largest university in the country.

Education takes place in 359 kindergartens, 435 general schools, 55 high schools, 9 higher education institutions with 49 faculties, in Romanian or Hungarian. There are also 26 scientific research institutes and a subsidiary of the Romanian Academy. Out of cultural institutions network can be mentioned 4 drama theaters, 2 operas, a national theater, "Transylvania" State Philharmonic, 453 libraries, 10 cinemas, 18 houses of culture, 223 community centers, 12 museums, etc.

== Health ==
There are 16 hospitals, 234 dispensaries, a TB sanatorium, 15 polyclinics, 122 pharmacies in which work 2,637 physicians, and 5,709 medical staff.

== Demography ==
According to the 2021 census, the county had a population of 679,141 and the population density was 101.8/km^{2} (263.6/sq mi).

On 1 January 2015, an analysis of the National Institute of Statistics revealed that 13.7% of the county population was between 0 and 14 years, 69.8% between 15 and 64 years, and 16.4% 65 years and over. 66.3% of the population lives in urban areas, having the fourth-highest rate of urbanization in the country, after Hunedoara (75%), Brașov (72,3%), and Constanța (68,8%).

Ethnic composition of Cluj County (2021)
1. Romanians (83.1%)
2. Hungarians (13.4%)
3. Romani (3.03%)
4. Germans (Transylvanian Saxons) (0.10%)
5. Others (0.41%)
Religious composition of Cluj County (2021)
1. Romanian Orthodox (72.9%)
2. Reformed (9.92%)
3. Pentecostals (3.72%)
4. Roman Catholics (3.20%)
5. Greek Catholics (3.10%)
6. Baptists (1.33%)
7. Unitarians (0.98%)
8. Jehovah's Witnesses (0.84%)
9. Others (1.27%)
10. Irreligious, atheist, and agnostic (2.75%)

| Year | County population |
|---|---|
| 1948 | 520,073 |
| 1956 | 580,344 ▲ |
| 1966 | 629,746 ▲ |
| 1977 | 715,507 ▲ |
| 1992 | 736,301 ▲ |
| 2002 | 702,755 ▼ |
| 2011 | 691,106 ▼ |
| 2021 | 679,141 ▼ |

At the 2011 census, the ethnic composition was as follows:

- Romanians – 80.09% (520,885 people)
- Hungarians – 15.93% (103,591 people). Hold the majority of the population in Sic (93.77%), Izvoru Crișului (79.04%), Sâncraiu (78.44%), Unguraș (61.46%), Moldovenești (55.14%), Săvădisla (51.63%).
- Romani – 3.46% (22,531 people). Large ethnic Roma communities are in Cămărașu (21.58%), Bonțida (19.81%), Recea-Cristur (18.34%), Fizeșu Gherlii (16.14%), Sânpaul (15.36%), Panticeu (13.12%), Săcuieu (13.02%), Frata (11.59%), Huedin (11.3%), Mociu (11.19%), Luna (10.44%).

== Politics ==
The Cluj County Council, renewed at the 2024 local elections, consists of 35 councilors, with the following party composition:

| Party | Seats | Current County Council |
|---|---|---|
| National Liberal Party (PNL) | 13 | |
| Social Democratic Party (PSD) | 7 | |
| United Right Alliance (ADU) | 6 | |
| Democratic Alliance of Hungarians (UDMR/RMDSZ) | 5 | |
| Alliance for the Union of Romanians (AUR) | 4 | |

== Administrative divisions ==
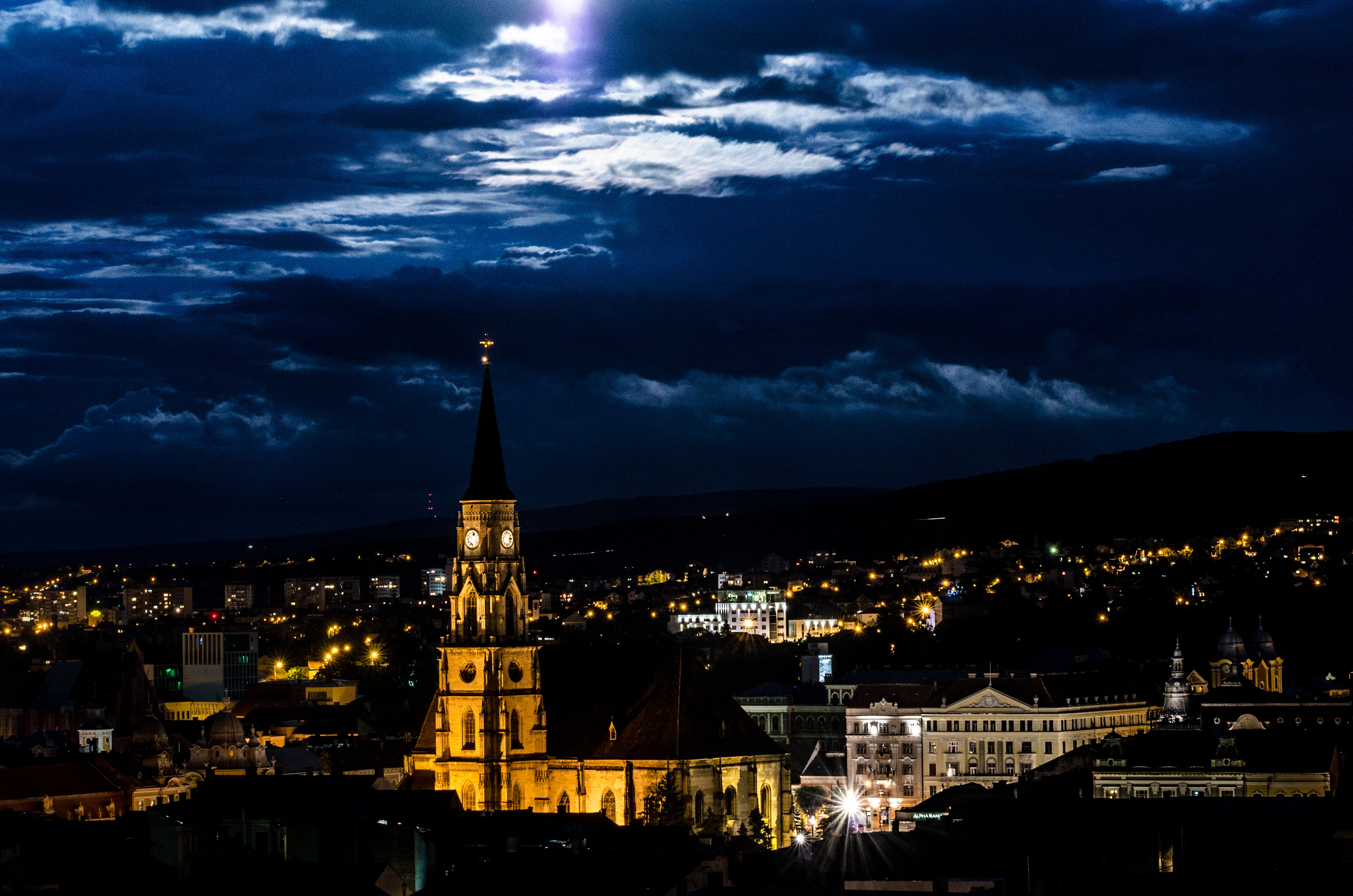
Cluj-Napoca, Cluj County seat, is the second largest city in Romania.

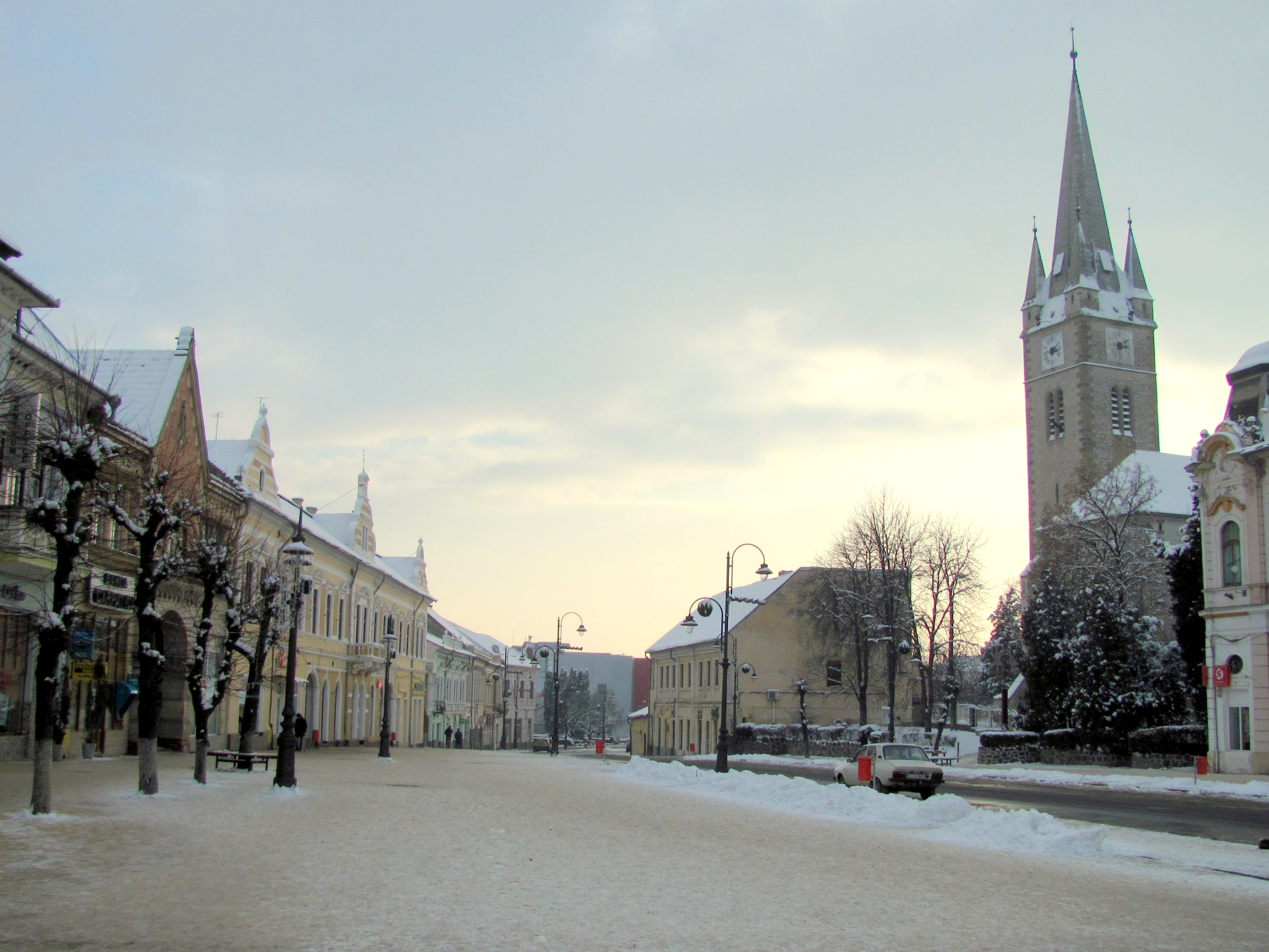
With a population of more than 47,000 inhabitants, Turda is the second largest city in Cluj County.

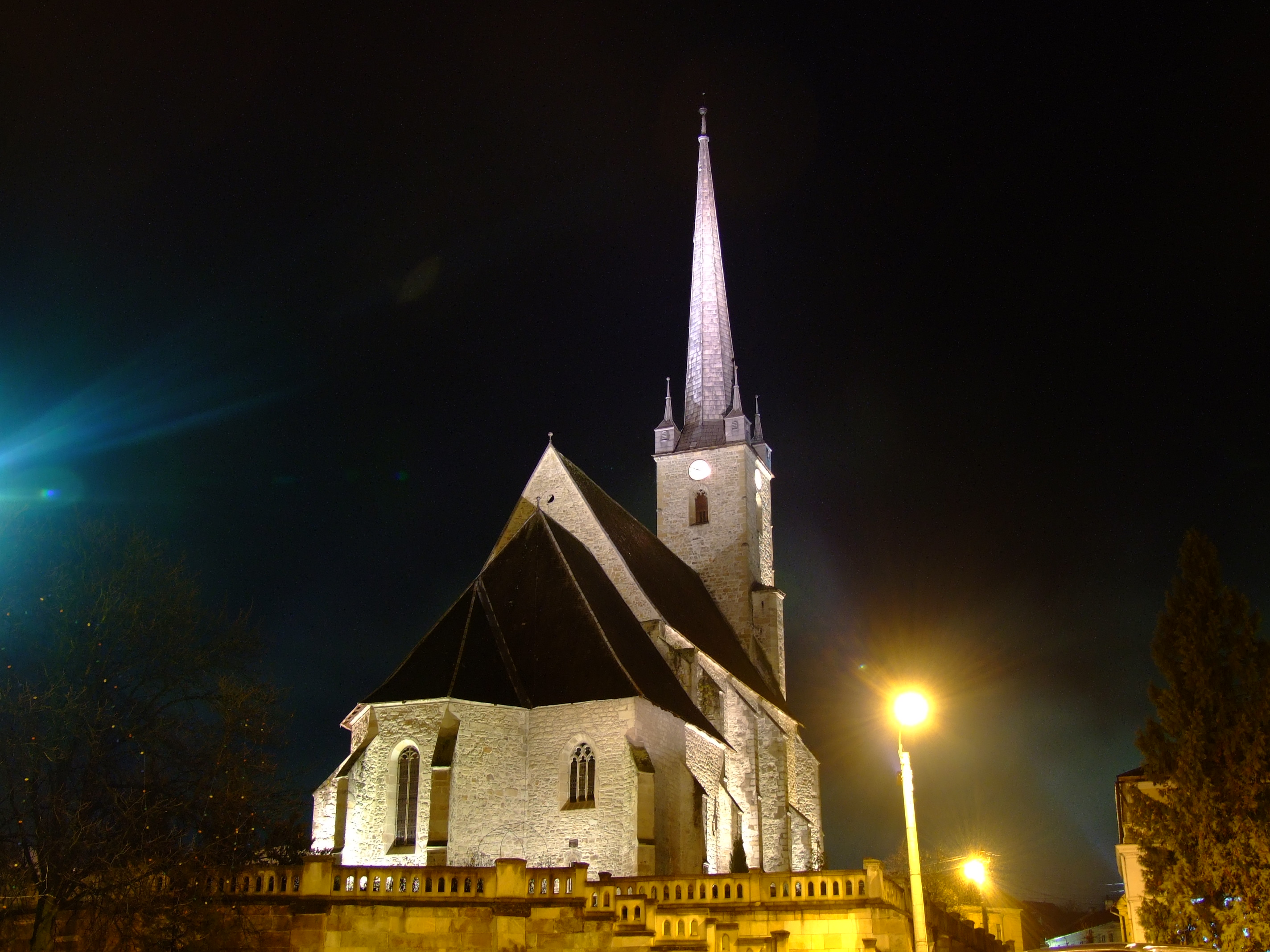
Dej

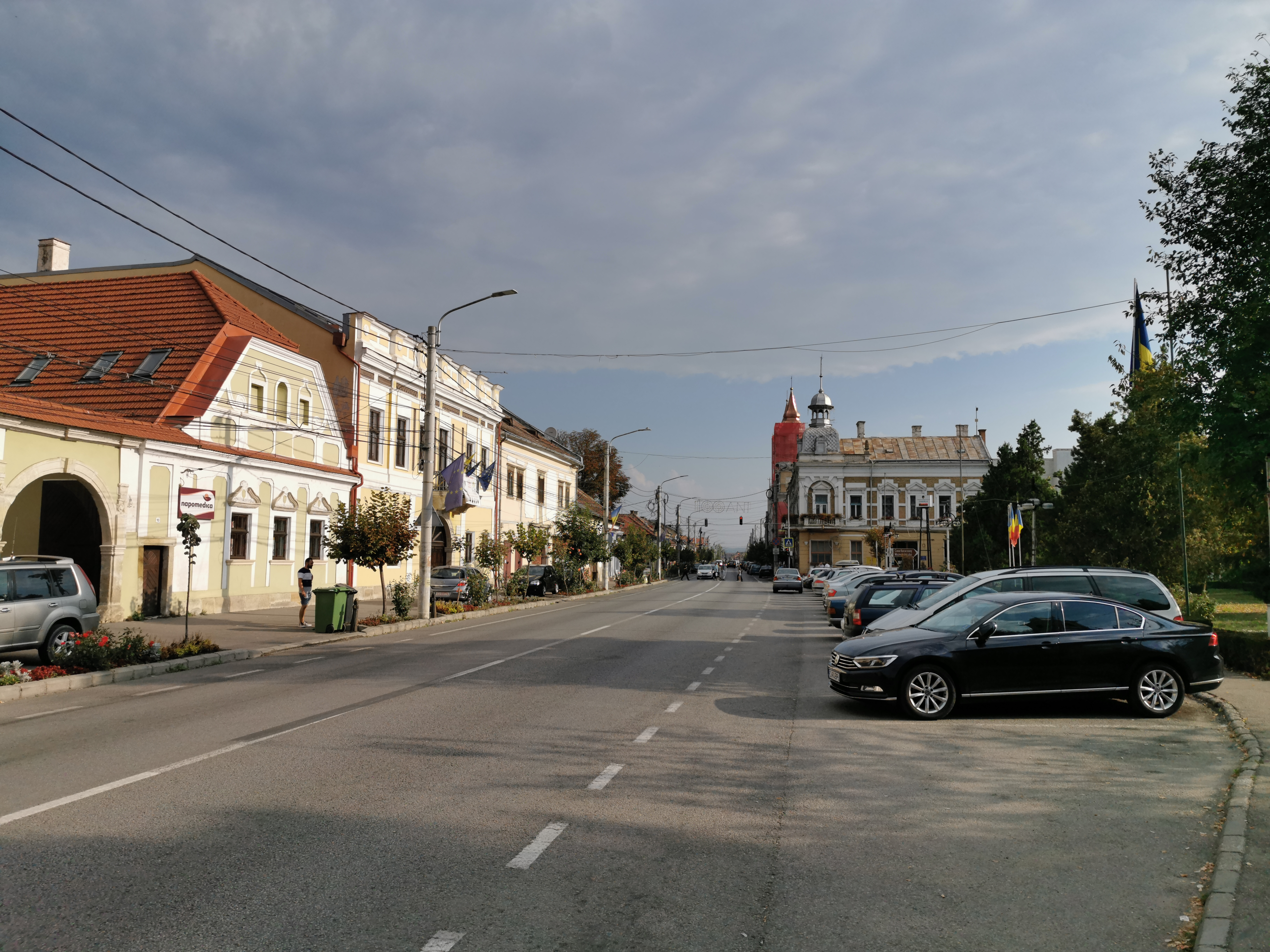
Gherla

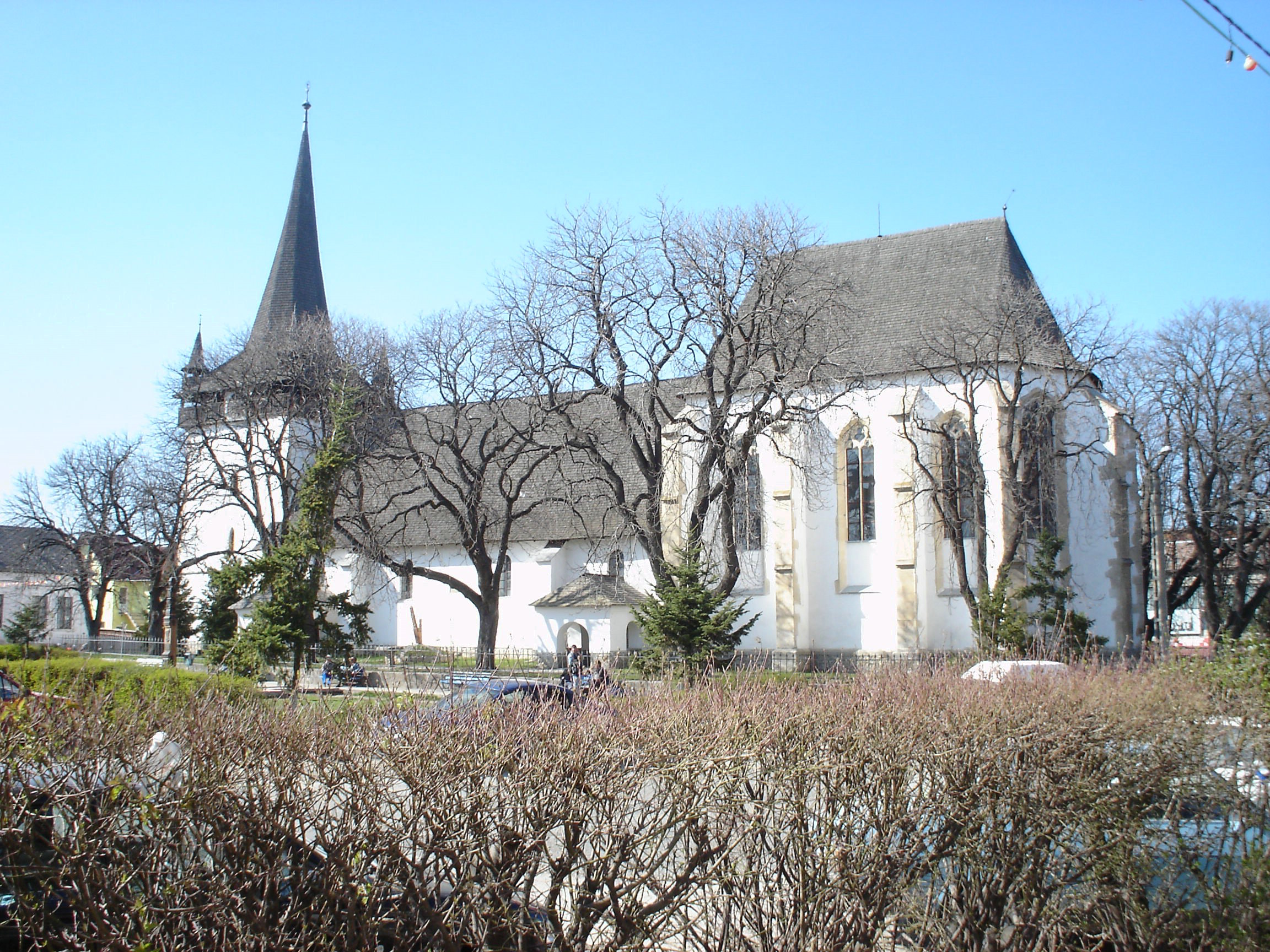
Huedin

Cluj County has 5 municipalities, 1 town and 75 communes.

- Municipalities:
  - Câmpia Turzii; pop. 22,223 (as of 2011)
  - Cluj-Napoca – county seat; pop. 324,576
  - Dej; pop. 33,497
  - Gherla; pop. 20,982
  - Turda; pop. 47,744
- Towns:
  - Huedin; pop. 9,346
- Communes:
  - Aghireșu
  - Aiton
  - Aluniș
  - Apahida
  - Așchileu
  - Baciu
  - Băişoara
  - Beliș
  - Bobâlna
  - Bonțida
  - Borșa
  - Buza
  - Căianu
  - Călărași
  - Călățele
  - Cămărașu
  - Căpușu Mare
  - Cășeiu
  - Cătina
  - Câțcău
  - Ceanu Mare
  - Chinteni
  - Chiuiești
  - Ciucea
  - Ciurila
  - Cojocna
  - Cornești
  - Cuzdrioara
  - Dăbâca
  - Feleacu
  - Fizeșu Gherlii
  - Florești
  - Frata
  - Gârbău
  - Geaca
  - Gilău
  - Iara
  - Iclod
  - Izvoru Crișului
  - Jichișu de Jos
  - Jucu
  - Luna
  - Măguri-Răcătău
  - Mănăstireni
  - Mărgău
  - Mărișel
  - Mica
  - Mihai Viteazu
  - Mintiu Gherlii
  - Mociu
  - Moldovenești
  - Negreni
  - Pălatca
  - Panticeu
  - Petreștii de Jos
  - Ploscoș
  - Poieni
  - Râșca
  - Recea-Cristur
  - Săcuieu
  - Săndulești
  - Săvădisla
  - Sâncraiu
  - Sânmartin
  - Sânpaul
  - Sic
  - Suatu
  - Tritenii de Jos
  - Tureni
  - Țaga
  - Unguraș
  - Vad
  - Valea Ierii
  - Viișoara
  - Vultureni

== Historical county ==
Județul Cluj
- County (Județ)
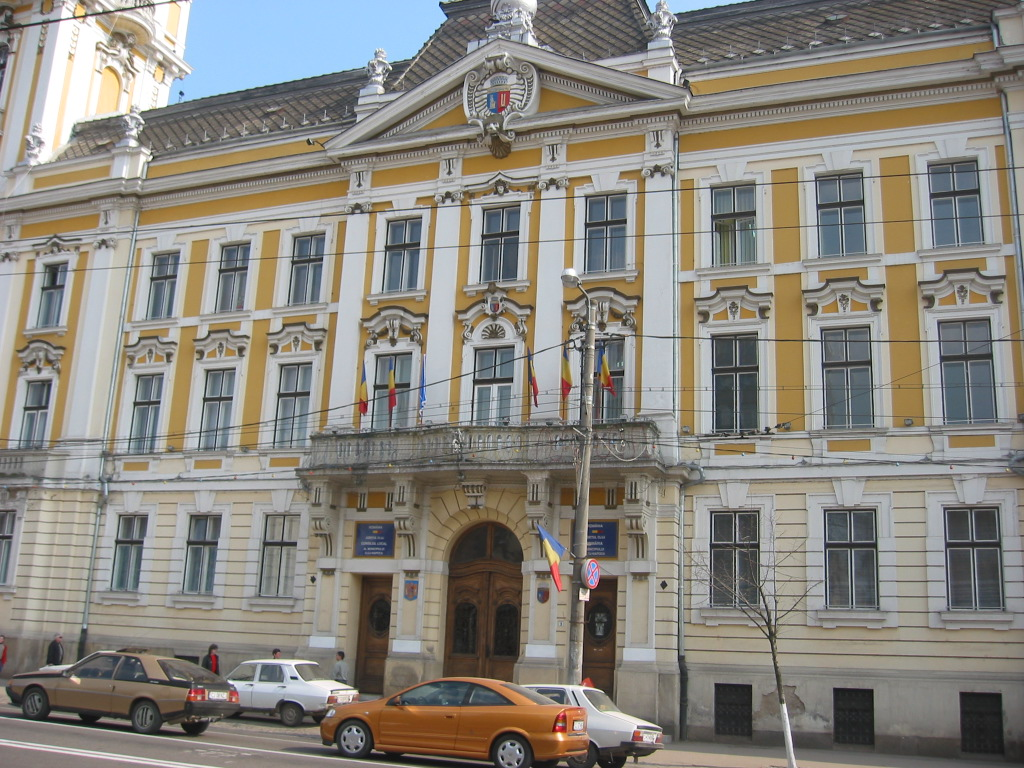
- The Cluj County Prefecture building of the interwar period, currently the Cluj-Napoca city hall.

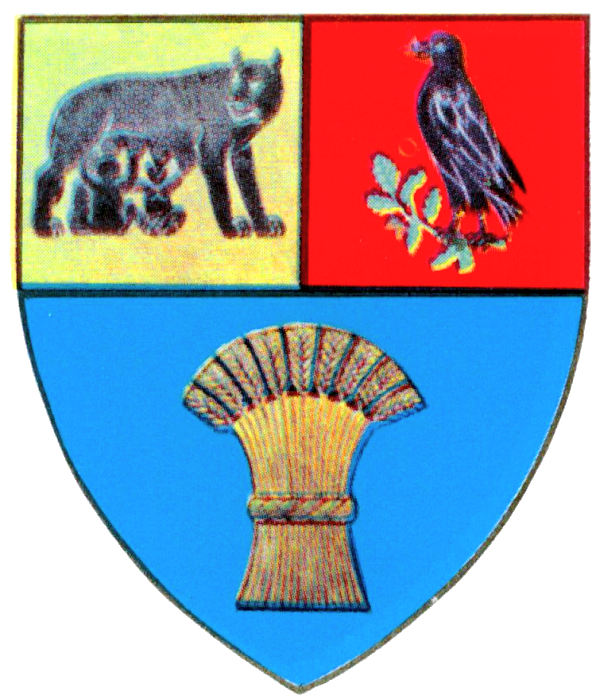
- Coat of arms

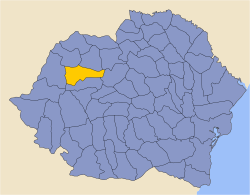
- Country: Romania
- Historic region: Transylvania
- Capital city (Reședință de județ): Cluj
- Established: 1925

Area
  - Total: 4,813 km^{2} (1,858 sq mi)

Population (1930)
  - Total: 334,991
  - Density: 69.60/km^{2} (180.3/sq mi)
- Time zone: UTC+2 (EET)
  - Summer (DST): UTC+3 (EEST)

Historically, Cojocna County was located in the central-northwestern part of Greater Romania, in the northwestern part of Transylvania. After reorganized and renamed to Cluj County, its territory included all of the current Cluj County, and some of the communes now in Sălaj County and Mureș County. It was bordered on the north by the counties of Sălaj, Someș, and Năsăud, on the west by Bihor County, on the south by Turda County, and to the east by Mureș County.

=== History ===
The territory of the county was transferred in 1920 from the Kingdom of Hungary, as successor state to Austria-Hungary, to Romania by the Treaty of Trianon. Thus, Cluj County was the successor to the former Hungarian administrative unit of Kolozs County (Hungarian: Kolozs vármegye). Until the year 1925 it was called Cojocna County (Romanian: Județul Cojocna). In Hungarian, the town of Cojocna is called "Kolozs", so it was a rough equivalent of the prior Hungarian name. Cojocna County's headquarters were in Cluj, but Cluj enjoyed the status of a free city. In 1925, the autonomous status of Cluj was abolished, and the free city was merged with the county of Cojocna, which was renamed Cluj County.

In 1938, King Carol II promulgated a new Constitution, and subsequently he had the administrative division of the Romanian territory changed. 10 ținuturi (approximate translation: "lands") were created (by merging the counties) to be ruled by rezidenți regali (approximate translation: "Royal Residents") - appointed directly by the King - instead of the prefects. Cluj County became part of Ținutul Crișuri.

In 1940, part of the county was transferred back to Hungary with the rest of Northern Transylvania under the Second Vienna Award. The parts of the county that remained under Romanian administration (the south of the county, including Feleacu), were united with Turda County and became Cluj-Turda County. Beginning in 1944, Romanian forces with Soviet assistance recaptured the ceded territory and reintegrated it into Romania. Romanian jurisdiction over the entire county per the Treaty of Trianon was reaffirmed in the Paris Peace Treaties, 1947. The county was disestablished by the communist government of Romania in 1950, and re-established in 1968 when Romania restored the county administrative system.

=== Administration ===
As of 1925, the county had an area of 5,079 km^{2} and a population of 352,029 inhabitants, consisted of 226 rural communes (equivalent to today's villages), and one urban commune (the city of Cluj), and was administratively subdivided into twelve districts (plăși):

1. Plasa Aghireșu, headquartered at Aghireșu
2. Plasa Almaș, headquartered at Hida
3. Plasa Borșa, headquartered at Borșa
4. Plasa Călata, headquartered at Călata
5. Plasa Câmpia, headquartered at Sărmașu
6. Plasa Criș, headquartered at Ciucea
7. Plasa Huedin, headquartered at Huedin
8. Plasa Mociu, headquartered at Mociu
9. Plasa Moților, headquartered at Gilău
10. Plasa Nădășel, headquartered at Baciu
11. Plasa Someș, headquartered at Răscruci
12. Plasa Vlaha, headquartered at Vlaha

The administration and territory of the county were reorganized in 1929, introducing municipalities, towns, communes and villages. The county' capital remained at Cluj (now Cluj-Napoca). The county had nine districts comprising one city (Cluj), one town Huedin, and 232 villages divided into seven other districts:

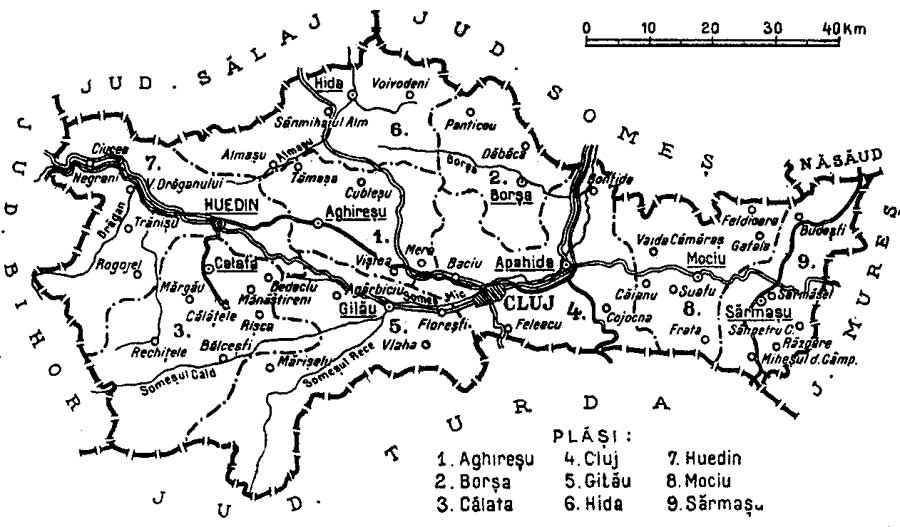
Map of Cluj County as constituted in 1938.

1. Plasa Aghireșu, headquartered at Aghireșu, containing 28 villages
2. Plasa Borșa, headquartered at Borșa, containing 20 villages
3. Plasa Călata, headquartered at Călata, containing 25 villages
4. Plasa Cluj, headquartered at Apahida, containing 46 villages
5. Plasa Gilău, headquartered at Gilău, containing 24 villages
6. Plasa Hida, headquartered at Hida, containing 37 villages
7. Plasa Huedin, headquartered at Huedin, containing 57 villages
8. Plasa Mociu, headquartered at Mociu, containing 28 villages
9. Plasa Sărmașu, headquartered at Sărmașu, containing 20 villages

=== Population ===
According to the census data of 1930, the county's population was 334,991, of which 60.9% were ethnic Romanians, 30.1% Hungarians, 5.1% Jews, 2.3% Romanies, 0.8% Germans, as well as other minorities. In the religious aspect, the population consisted of 42.7% Greek Catholic, 21.7% Reformed, 19.3% Eastern Orthodox, 8.6% Roman Catholic, 5.3% Jewish, 0.8% Lutheran, and other minorities. The county's population was spread out among the districts, the most populous of which were: 15.2% of the county's population was in the city of Cluj, 14.2% in Plasa Huedin, 8.8% in Plasa Hida, 8.1% in Plasa Gilău, 7.1% in Plasa Sărmașu, and 6.2% in Plasa Borșa.

==== Urban population ====
In 1930, the urban population of the county was 106,245, of which 47.6% were ethnic Hungarians, 33.9% Romanians, 13.3% Jews, 2.4% Germans, as well as other minorities. As the mother tongue in the urban population, Hungarian predominated (54.6%), followed by Romanian (33.8%), Yiddish (7.1%), German (2.6%), as well as other minority languages. From the religious point of view, the urban population was made up of 27.8% Reformed, 22.2% Greek Catholic, 19.5% Roman Catholic, 13.7% Jewish, 11.7% Eastern Orthodox, 2.3% Lutheran, 2.0% Unitarian, as well as other minorities.
