= Calata =

Calata is the name of the following persons:

- Fort Calata (1956-1985), South African politician
- James Calata (1895–1983), South African politician
- Joseph Calata (born 1980), Filipino businessman

Călata is the name of these geographical denominations:

- Călata, a tributary of the Crișul Repede in Cluj County, Romania
- Călata, a village in Călățele Commune, Cluj County, Romania

Other meanings:

- Comitia Calata was an assembly for religious purposes in ancient Rome
