= Țara Călatei =

Region of Transylvania

Coordinates: 46.8000°N 23.1333°E

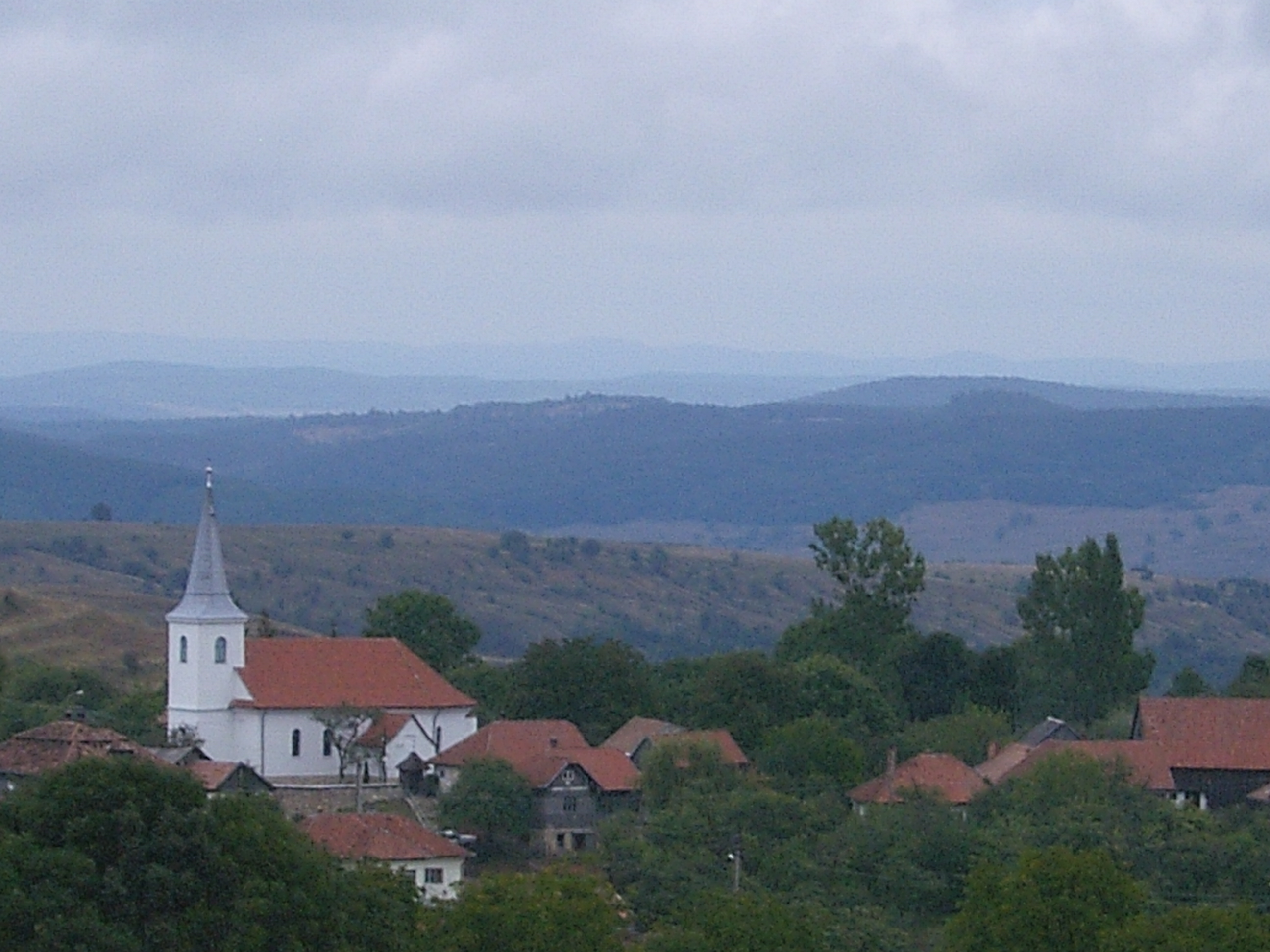
Dumbrava, Țara Călatei, Cluj County, Romania

Țara Călatei (Hungarian: Kalotaszeg) is a region in Transylvania, Romania. It is one of the many areas in Western Romania with a significant Hungarian population (30% in 2011), and is a stronghold of old Transylvanian Hungarian folk traditions.

== Geography ==
Țara Călatei (Hung.: Kalotaszeg) is a rural region situated just west of Cluj-Napoca, spanning across western Cluj County and southern Sălaj County. Its historical centre is the small town of Huedin. The region has an ethnically mixed population, consisting mostly of Romanians, Hungarians (20,000 people or 30% of the population at the 2011 census), and Roma; its Jewish population suffered heavily during the Second World War.

== Name ==
According to tradition, the region takes its name from the Hungarian Kalota clan, which settled it during the Hungarian conquest of the Carpathian Basin. - cf. the villages of Kiskalota (Hungarian for 'Little Kalota'; Romanian: Călățele) and Nagykalota (Hungarian for 'Large Kalota'; Romanian: Călat).

The oldest form of the region's name is Kalathazeg and was first mentioned in a 1433 deed, but some still extant villages are mentioned in 12th-century documents. The name formerly referred to a much larger territory; according to a study by historian and archivist Lajos Kelemen (1877–1963), "History and Monuments of Kalotaszeg" (Cluj, 1944), during the Middle Ages the area reached from the Barcău to the Crișul Repede River. The region as it is known today lies mainly west of the city of Cluj, although there are also some villages north and east of Cluj, which follow Kalotaszeg customs.

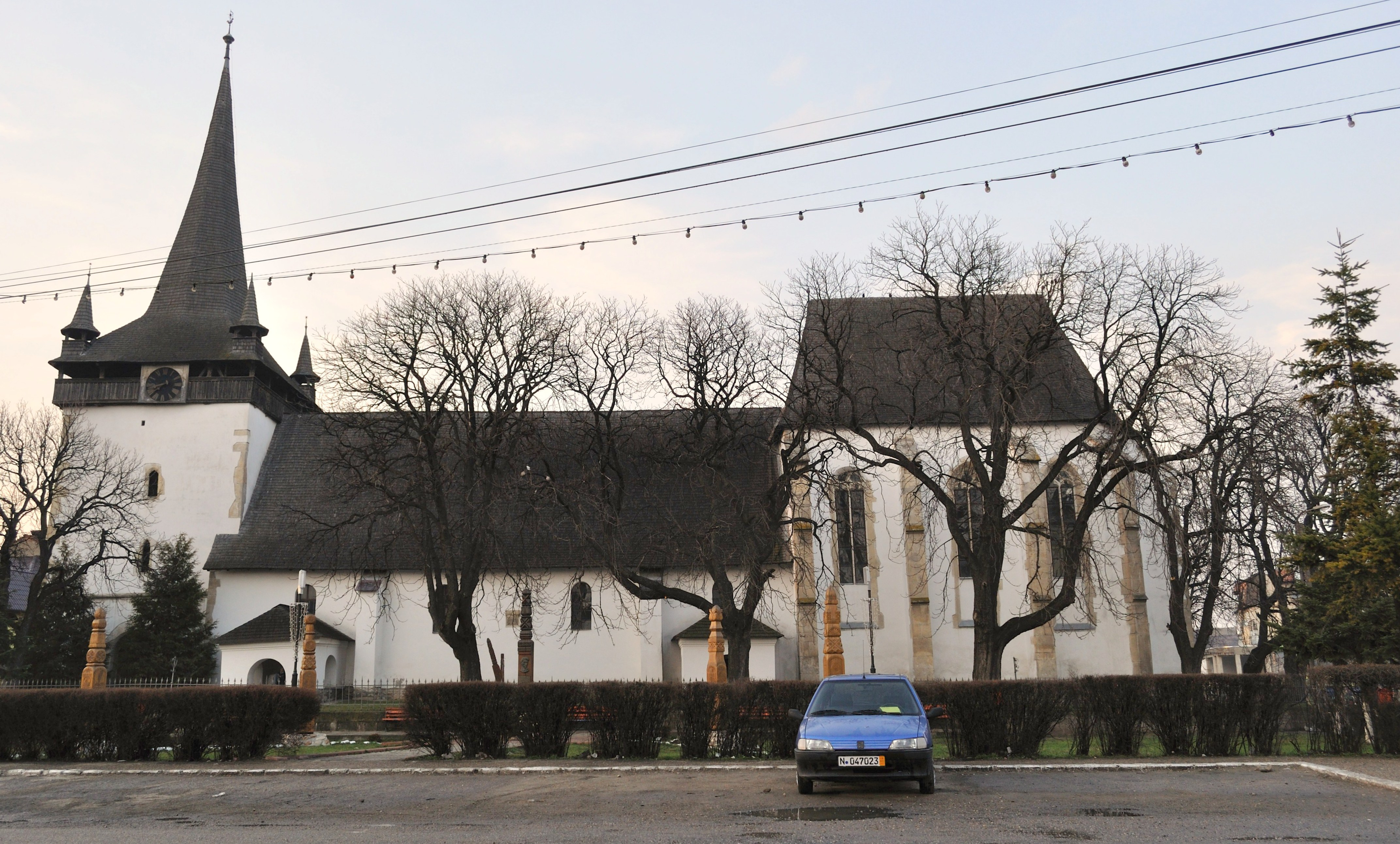
Huedin Calvinist Reformed Church

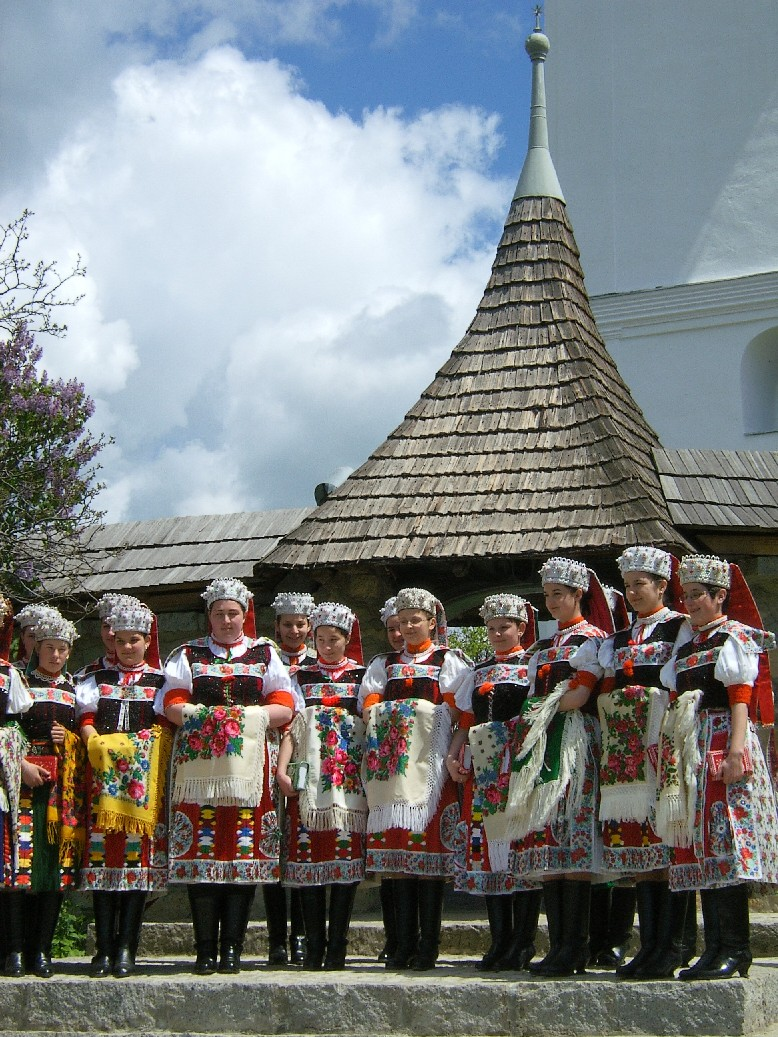
Traditional Hungarian costumes from Izvoru Crișului (Hungarian: Körösfő)

== The Hungarian community ==
Hungarians are the largest ethnic minority in the region, and make up a majority in some villages. The dominant religion amongst Hungarians in the region is Calvinism, with the exception of the village of Leghia (Hungarian: Jegenye), which is Catholic; Huedin (Hungarian: Bánffyhunyad) also has a smaller Catholic church.

The churches of the region are typically painted white, feature a tetragonal bell tower with a pointed wooden spire, and surrounded by a wall. Church service is generally segregated by gender and age.

Female traditional clothing is distinguished through its highly colourful and ornate appearance, usually accented by pearl-laden headwear. Traditional clothing from the region is displayed in the ethnographic museums of both Budapest and Cluj. Locals continue to preserve, produce and wear this type of clothing on special occasions.

The Hungarian Cultural Days of Cluj, an annual cultural festival held in August, features folk and cultural performances by artists from the region.

== Țara Călatei in popular culture ==
The region was featured in the film Kalotaszegi Madonna ("Madonna from Țara Călatei", 1943), made in Northern Transylvania, when it was a part the Kingdom of Hungary between 1940–1944. The film takes place mainly in Cluj, but some scenes were shot elsewhere in the region.

== Gallery ==
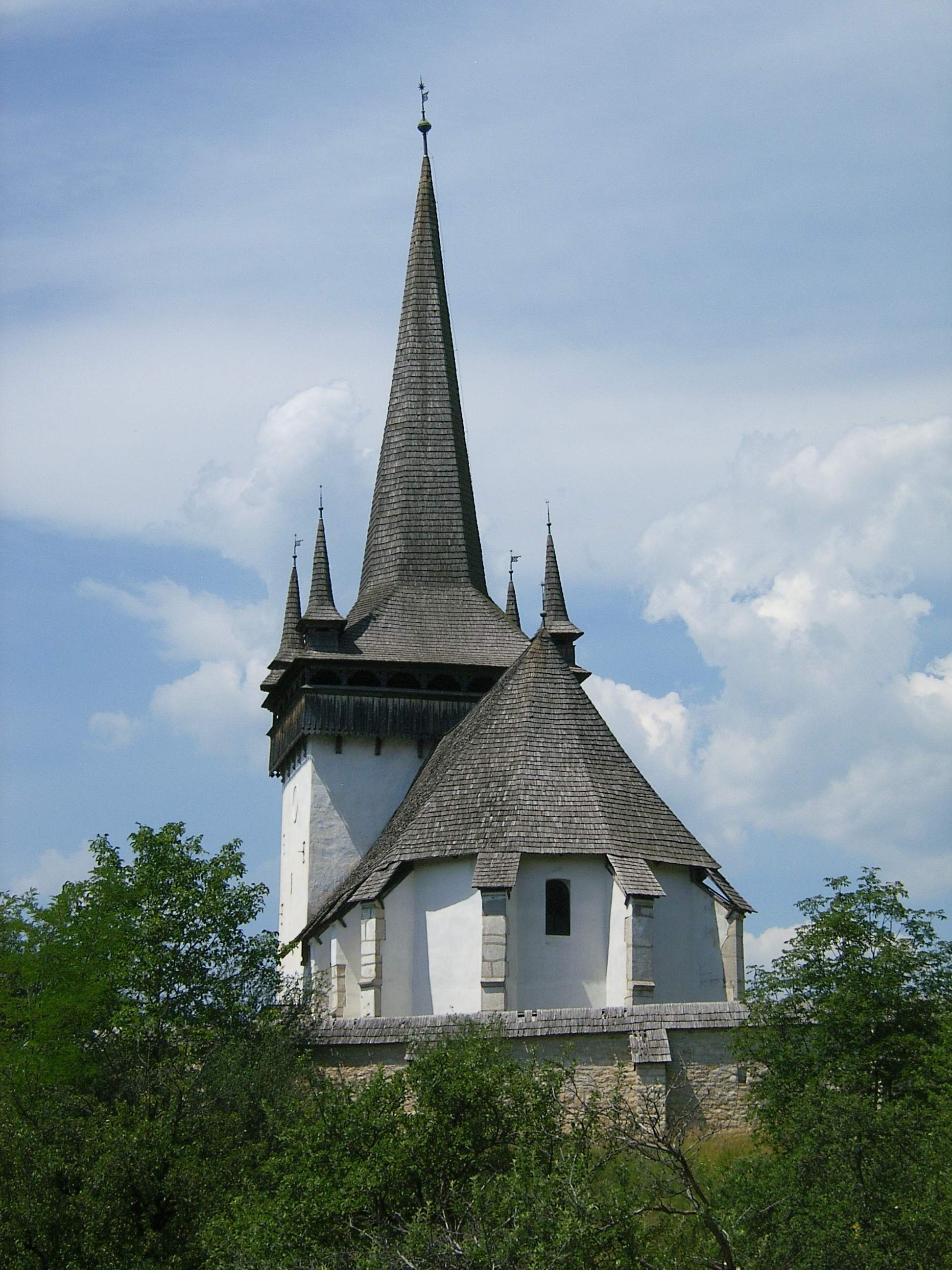
Hungarian church of Văleni village

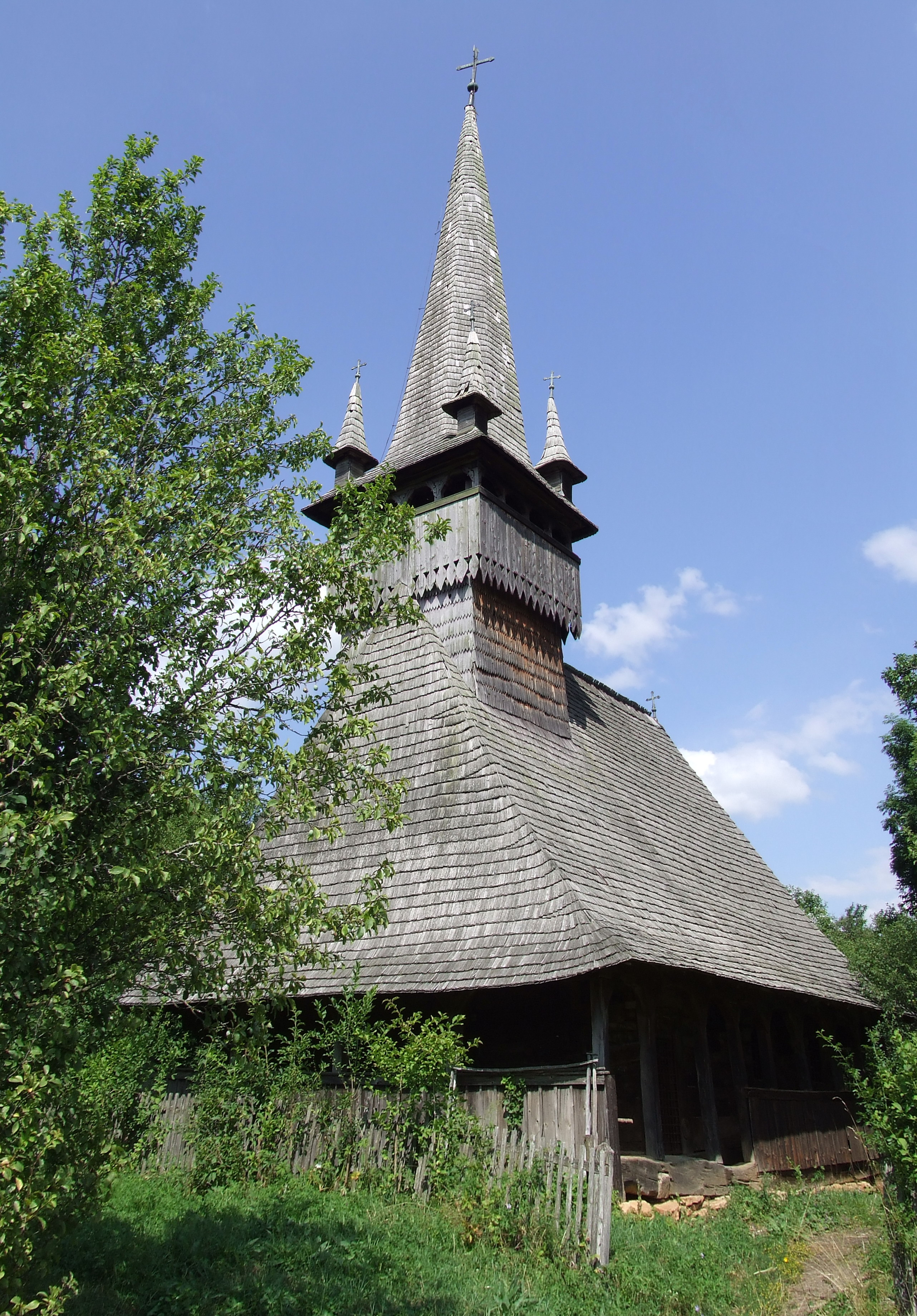
Romanian wooden church of Agârbiciu (17th century)

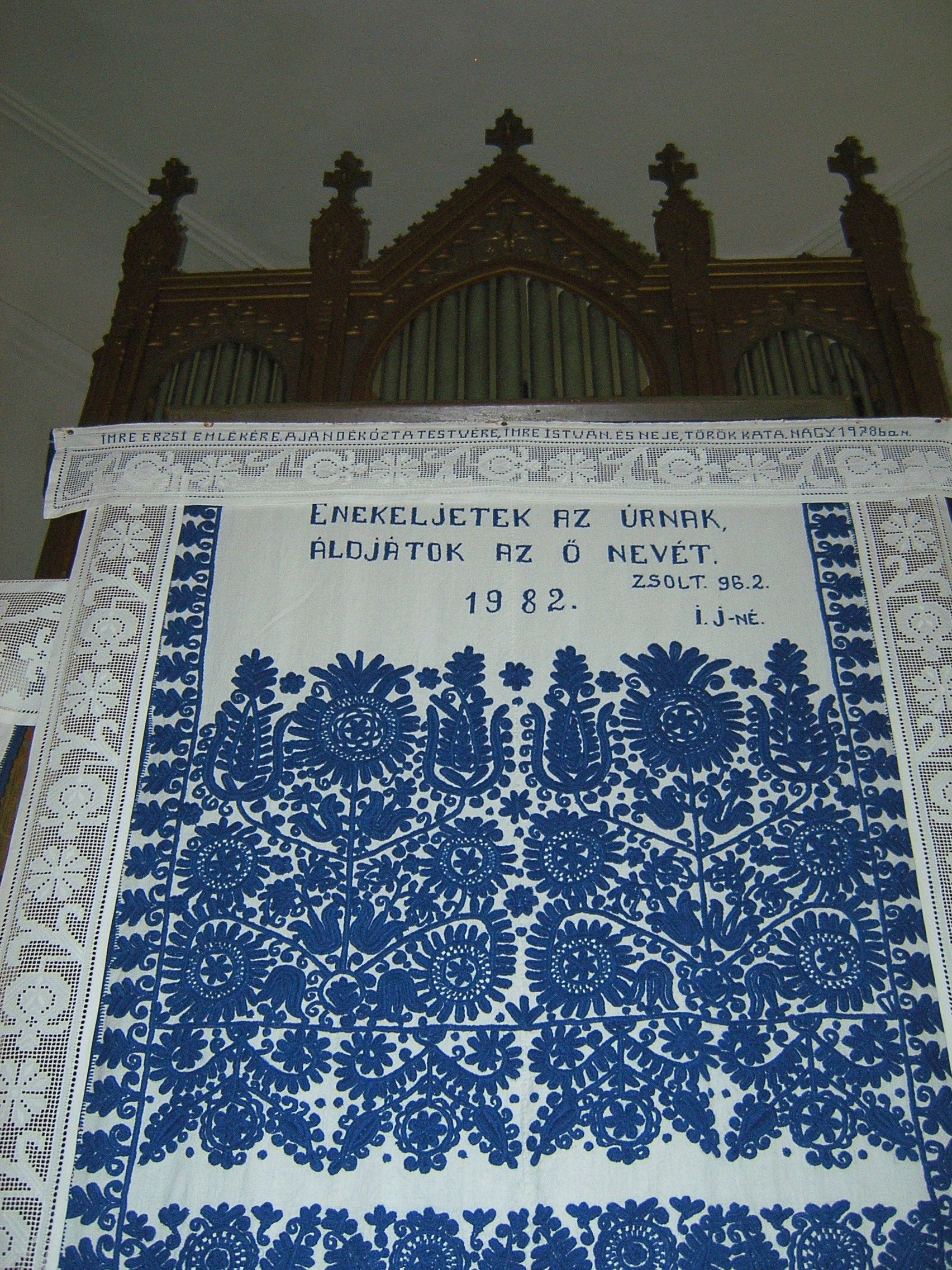
Organ, Mănăstireni church

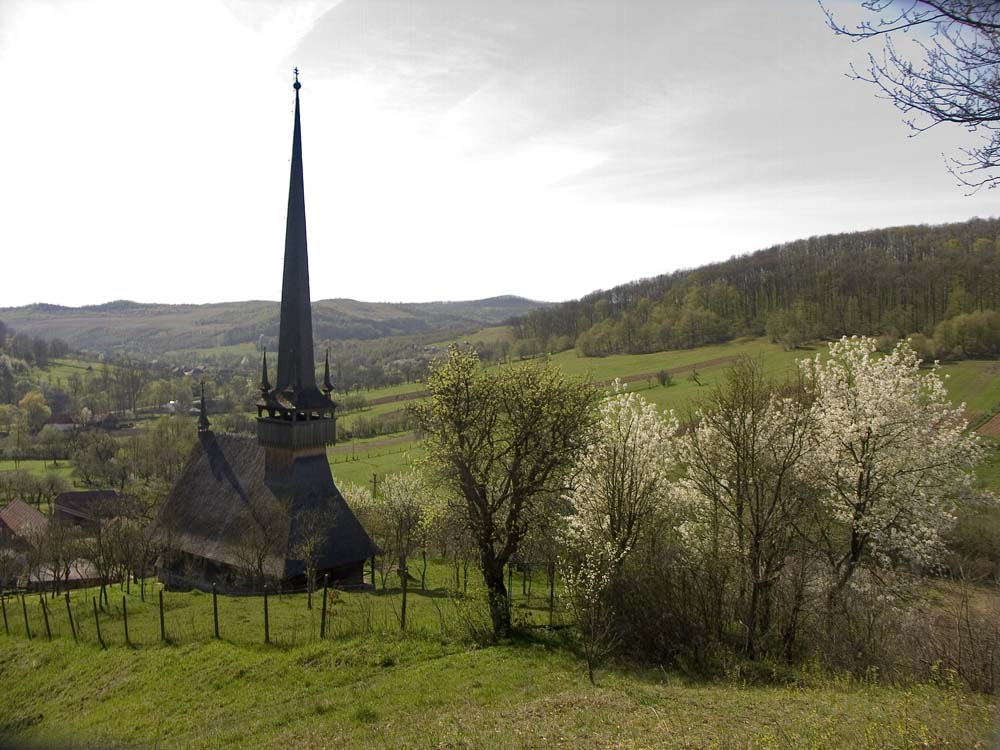
Romanian church of Fildu de Sus, Sălaj County (18th century)
