= Alunișu =

Alunișu may refer to several places in Romania:

- Alunișu, a village in Băiculești Commune, Argeș County
- Alunișu, a village in Brăduleț Commune, Argeș County
- Alunișu, a village in Sâncraiu Commune, Cluj County
- Alunișu, a village in Cornățelu Commune, Dâmbovița County
- Alunișu, a district in the town of Măgurele, Ilfov County
- Alunișu, a village in Spineni Commune, Olt County

== See also ==
- Aluniș (disambiguation)
- Alunișul (disambiguation)
