= Pruneni =

Pruneni may refer to several villages in Romania:

- Pruneni, a village in Zărneşti Commune, Buzău County
- Pruneni, a village in Aluniş Commune, Cluj County
