= Alunul River =

Alunul River may refer to the following rivers in Romania:

- Alunul, a tributary of the Cracăul Alb in Neamț County
- Alunul, a tributary of the Nechit in Neamț County
- Alunul, a tributary of the Sadu in Gorj County

== See also ==
- Aluna River, a tributary of the river Șușița in Romania
- Aluniș River (disambiguation)
- Alunișu River (disambiguation)
