= Aluniș =

Aluniș may refer to:

== Populated places ==
=== Romania ===
- Aluniș, Cluj, a commune in Cluj County
- Aluniș, Mureș, a commune in Mureș County
- Aluniș, Prahova, a commune in Prahova County
- Aluniș, a village in Frumușeni Commune, Arad County
- Aluniș, a village in Mioarele Commune, Argeș County
- Aluniș, a village in Colți Commune, Buzău County
- Aluniș, a village in Cornățelu Commune, Dâmbovița County
- Aluniș, a village in Pietrari Commune, Dâmbovița County
- Aluniș, a village in Căpreni Commune, Gorj County
- Aluniș, a village in Mugeni Commune, Harghita County
- Aluniș, a village in Benesat Commune, Sălaj County

=== Moldova ===
- Aluniș, Rîșcani, a commune in Rîșcani district

== Rivers in Romania ==
- Aluniș, a small river in the city of Brașov
- Aluniș (Călata), a tributary of the Călata in Cluj County
- Aluniș, a tributary of the Cracăul Negru in Neamț County
- Aluniș, a tributary of the Homorodul Mic in Harghita County
- Aluniș, a tributary of the Săcuieu in Cluj County
- Aluniș (Vărbilău), a tributary of the Vărbilău in Prahova County
- Aluniș, a tributary of the Vițău in Suceava County

== See also ==
- Alunișu (disambiguation)
- Alunișul (disambiguation)
