= Erdőfalva =

Erdőfalva is the Hungarian name for two villages in Romania:

- Ardeova village, Mănăstireni Commune, Cluj County
- Ardeu village, Balșa Commune, Hunedoara County
