= Ghirolt =

Ghirolt may refer to several villages in Romania:

- Ghirolt, a village in Aluniş Commune, Cluj County
- Ghirolt, a village in Moftin Commune, Satu Mare County
