= Bánffytelep =

Bánffytelep is the Hungarian name for two villages in Romania:

- Fiad village, Telciu Commune, Bistriţa-Năsăud County
- Dealu Negru village, Călățele Commune, Cluj County
