= Corvin Radovici =

Romanian chess player

Personal information
- Born: 19 December 1931 Călățele, Romania
- Died: 17 August 2017 (aged 85)

Chess career
- Country: Romania
- Title: International Master (1968)
- Peak rating: 2410 (January 1978)

Corvin Radovici (19 December 1931 – 17 August 2017), was a Romanian chess player, International Master (IM) (1968).

== Biography ==
In the 1960s Corvin Radovici was one of the leading Romanian chess players. He was a multiple participant of the Romanian Chess Championship. In 1958, he shared first place in International Chess Tournament in Sofia. In 1961, he ranked third in International Chess Tournament in Bucharest. In 1968, he was awarded the FIDE International Master (IM) title.

Corvin Radovici played for Romania in the Chess Olympiads:

- In 1960, at fourth board in the 14th Chess Olympiad in Leipzig (+4, =5, -6),
- In 1962, at first reserve board in the 15th Chess Olympiad in Varna (+3, =5, -1),
- In 1964, at third board in the 16th Chess Olympiad in Tel Aviv (+4, =11, -2).

Corvin Radovici played for Romania in the European Team Chess Championship:

- In 1965, at fourth board in the 3rd European Team Chess Championship in Hamburg (+1, =8, -1).

Later Corvin Radovici became known as a chess coach. He discovered and raised two of the Romanian chess players: Florin Gheorghiu, the first Romanian player who win the title of Grandmaster (GM) and Liviu-Dieter Nisipeanu, the first Romanian chess player who cross the barrier of an Elo coefficient of 2700 and won European Individual Chess Championship in 2005.
