= Sándor Keresztes =

Hungarian politician and diplomat (1919–2013)

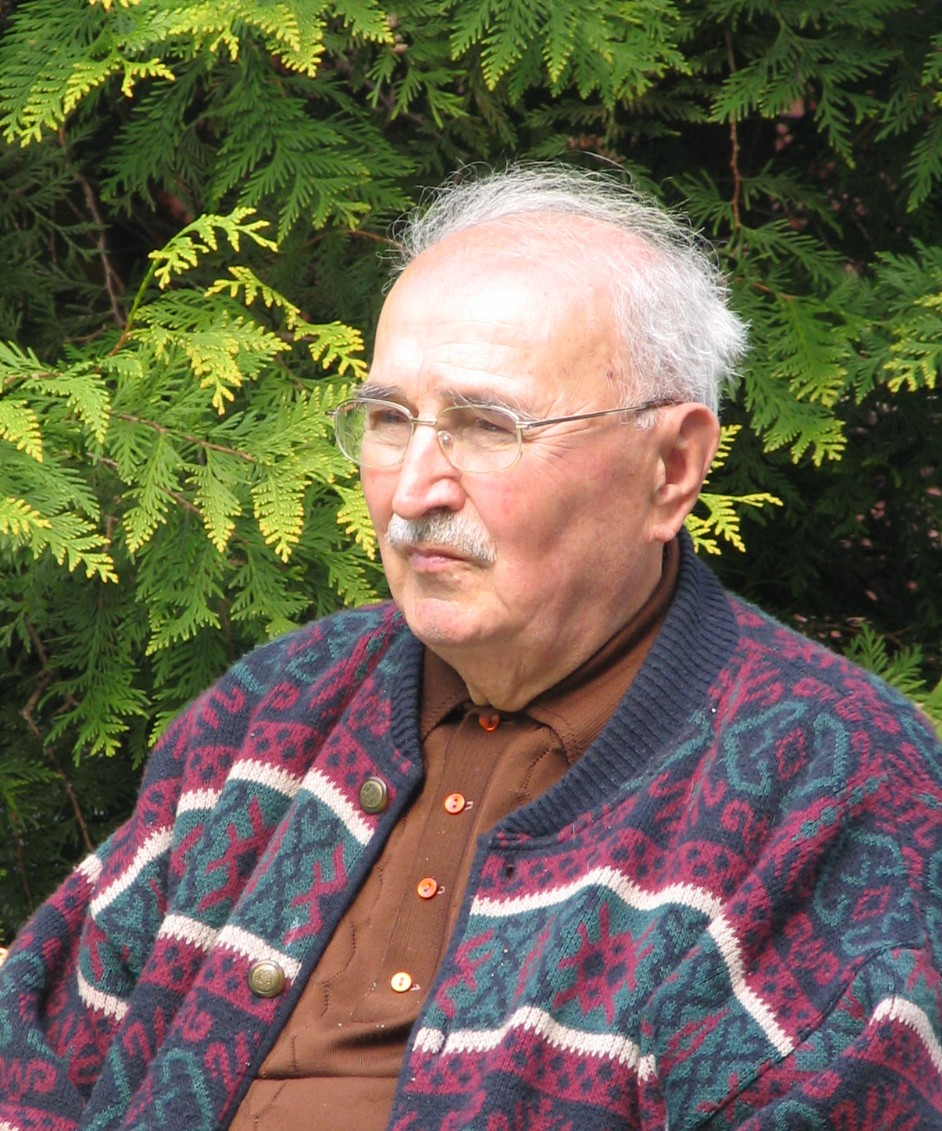

Member of the National Assembly
- In office 28 June 1994 – 17 June 1998
- In office 2 May 1990 – 31 August 1990
- In office 16 September 1947 – 7 July 1948

Personal details
- Born: 9 March 1919 Magyarókereke, Hungary (today Sâncraiu, Romania)
- Died: 14 August 2013 (aged 94) Budapest, Hungary
- Party: KDNP (1989–2013)
- Other political affiliations: DNP (1945–1949)
- Profession: jurist, diplomat

Dr. Sándor Keresztes (9 March 1919 – 14 August 2013) was a Hungarian diplomat and jurist, who served as president of the Christian Democratic People's Party (1989–1990) and Member of Parliament (1947–1948, 1990, 1994–1998).

Party political offices
Preceded by New party	President of the KDNP; 1989–1990	Succeeded by László Surján
