= Alunișul =

Alunișul may refer to several villages in Romania:

- Alunișul, a village in Zagra Commune, Bistrița-Năsăud County
- Alunișul, a village in Husnicioara Commune, Mehedinți County

== See also ==
- Aluniș (disambiguation)
- Alunișu (disambiguation)
