= Căpuș =

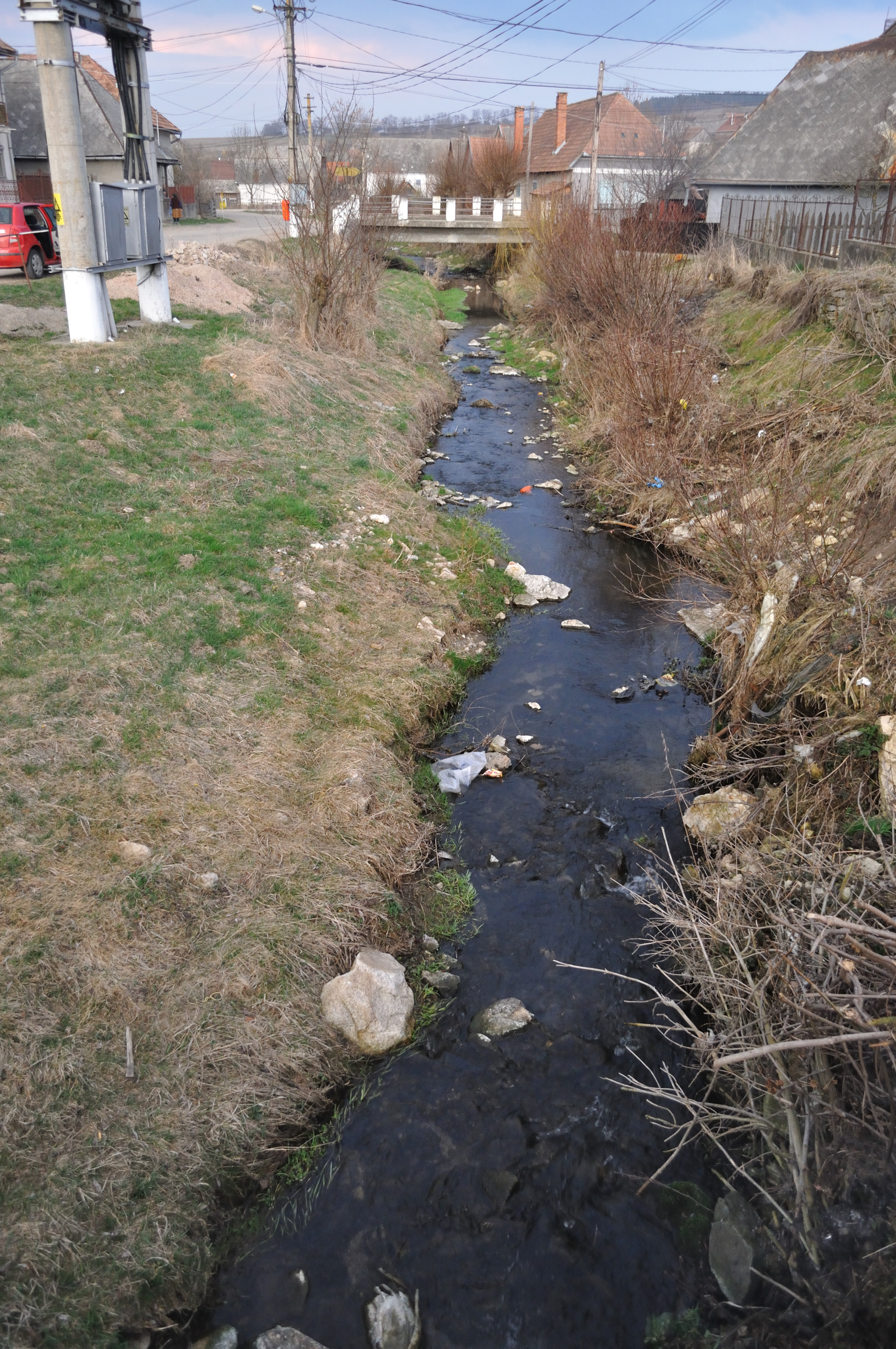

- Location within Romania

Location
- Country: Romania
- Counties: Cluj County
- Villages: Mănăstireni, Bedeciu, Căpușu Mic, Căpușu Mare, Gilău

Physical characteristics
- Mouth: Someșul Mic
  - location: Gilău
  - coordinates: 46.7535°N 23.3942°E
- Length: 32 km (20 mi)
- Basin size: 142 km^{2} (55 sq mi)

Basin features
- Progression: Someșul Mic→ Someș→ Tisza→ Danube→ Black Sea
- Tributaries
  - left: Pârâul Tare
  - right: Valea Mare

The Căpuș (Hungarian: Kapus) is a left tributary of the river Someșul Mic in Romania. It discharges into the Someșul Mic in Gilău. Its length is 32 km (20 mi) and its basin size is 142 km^{2} (55 sq mi).
