= Atilla Kiss B. =

Romanian-born Hungarian operatic tenor (born 1963)

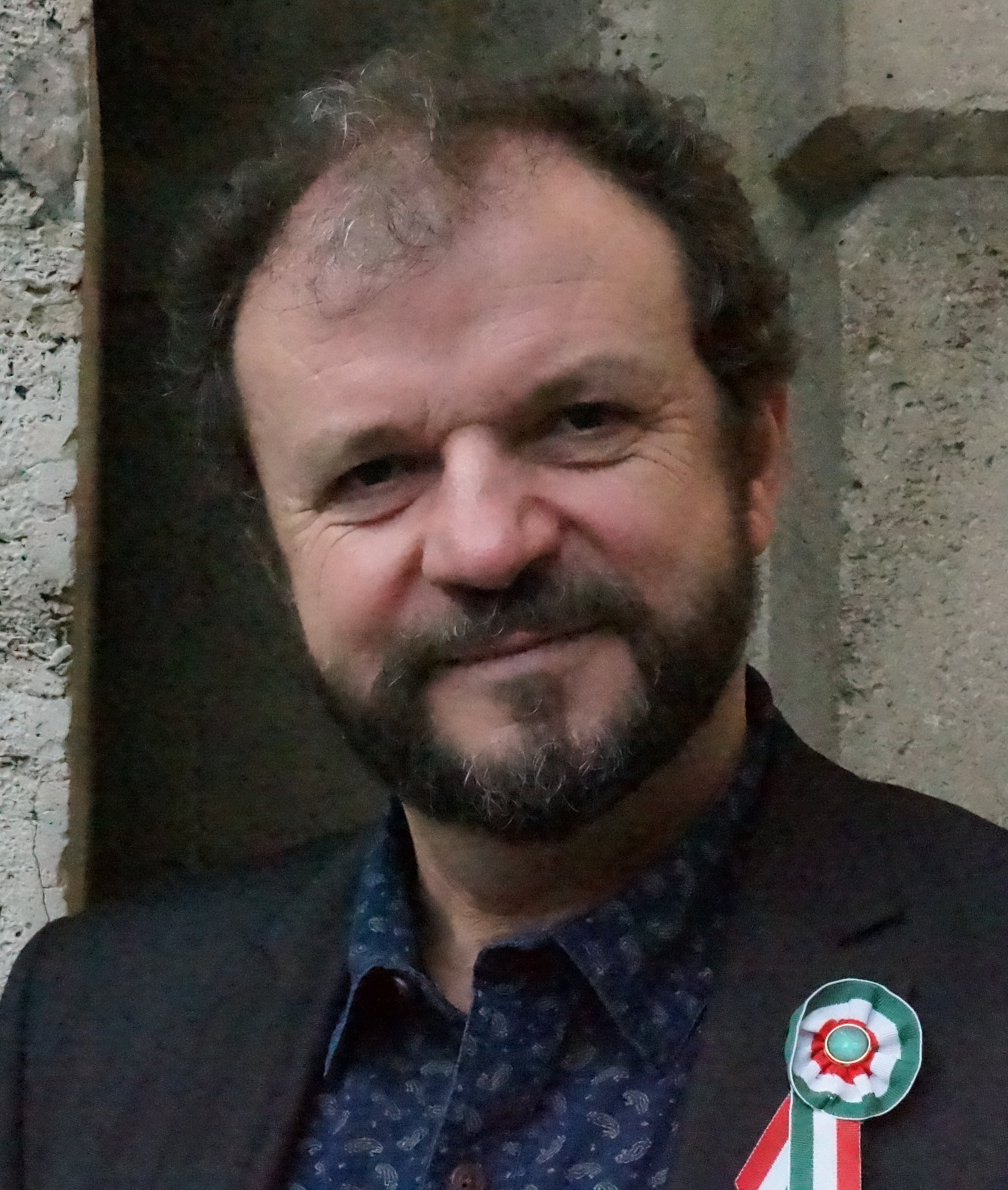
- Born: 28 January 1963 (age 63); Huedin, Romania
- Occupation: Opera singer (tenor)
- Years active: 1993 - present

Atilla Kiss B. (Hungarian style Kiss B. Atilla) (born 28 January 1963, Huedin) is a Romanian-born Hungarian operatic tenor. He made his debut at the Cluj-Napoca Hungarian Opera in 1993. In 2002 he sang the title role in the film version of Ferenc Erkel's opera Bánk bán.

Kiss has been awarded the Franz Liszt Prize (2002), the Order of Merit of the Republic of Hungary (2011), and the Kossuth Prize (2014).

== Biography ==
Atilla Kiss B. has his roots in the Hungarian minority in Romania. He was born in Transsylvanian town Huedin (Hungarian Bánffyhunyad), which is situated in nowadays Romania, but belonged to Hungary up until the borders were changed after World War I. He got in to the Hungarian language opera education at the Musical Academy in Cluj in Romania when he was 26 years old, after the fall of Communism, and started to sing leading roles already during his education. In 1999 he moved to Budapest, and has since then been engaged at the Hungarian State Opera House as a leading tenor.
