= Călata =

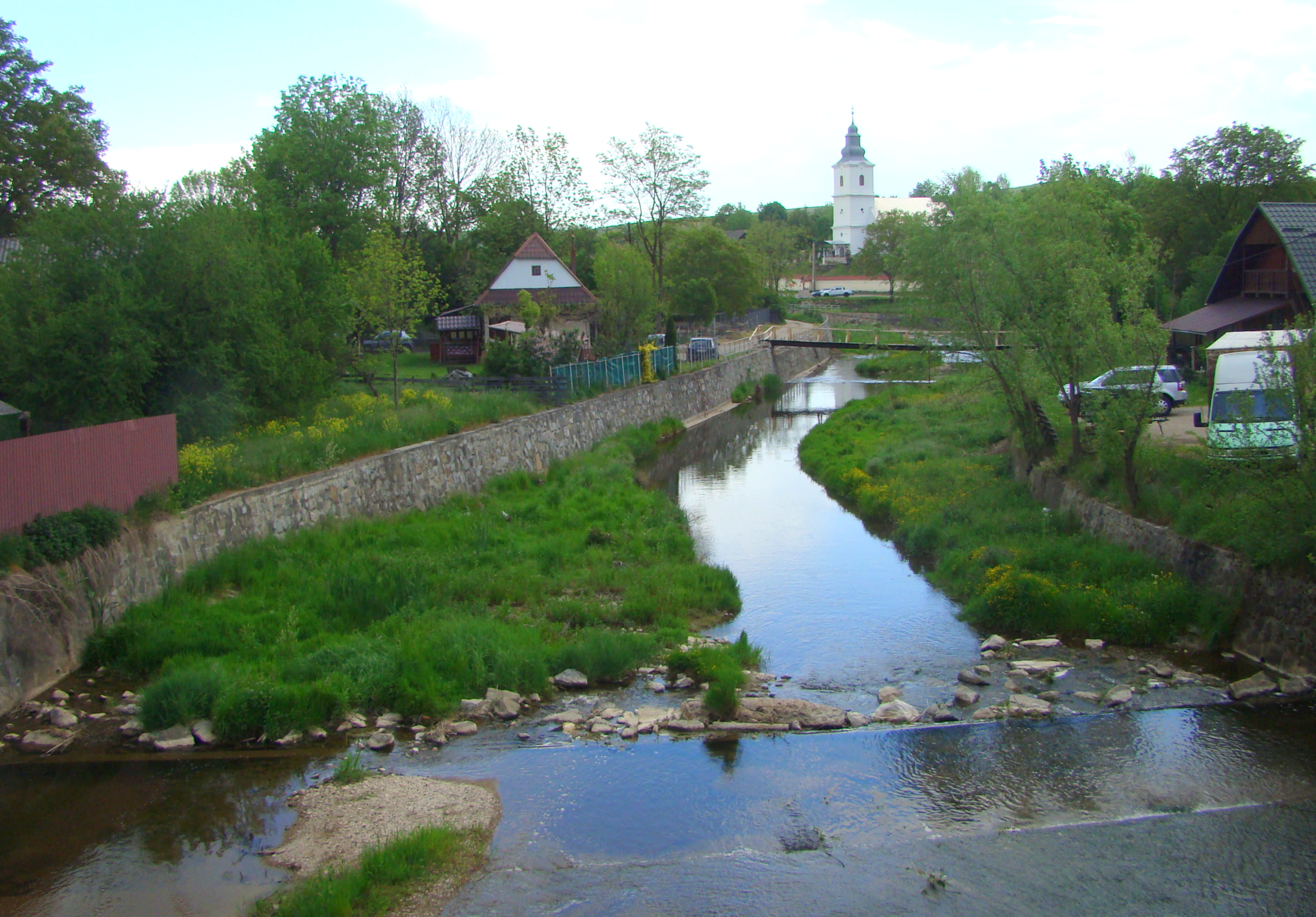

- Location within Romania

Location
- Country: Romania
- Counties: Cluj County
- Villages: Călățele, Călata, Sâncraiu, Brăișoru, Morlaca

Physical characteristics
- Mouth: Crișul Repede
  - location: Bologa
  - coordinates: 46.8836°N 22.8959°E
- Length: 35 km (22 mi)
- Basin size: 151 km^{2} (58 sq mi)

Basin features
- Progression: Crișul Repede→ Körös→ Tisza→ Danube→ Black Sea

The Călata is a left tributary of the river Crișul Repede in Romania. It discharges into the Crișul Repede near Bologa. Its length is 35 km (22 mi) and its basin size is 151 km^{2} (58 sq mi).

== Tributaries ==
The following rivers are tributaries to the Călata:

- Left: Călățele, Bociu, Valea lui Băl, Aluniș
