= Aluniș (Călata) =

- Location within Romania

Location
- Country: Romania
- Counties: Cluj County

Physical characteristics
- Mouth: Călata
  - coordinates: 46.8504°N 22.9642°E
- Length: 7 km (4.3 mi)
- Basin size: 10 km^{2} (3.9 sq mi)

Basin features
- Progression: Călata→ Crișul Repede→ Körös→ Tisza→ Danube→ Black Sea
- River code: III.1.44.3.4

The Aluniș (Hungarian: Mogyorós-patak) is a river in Romania, left tributary of the Călata. It flows into the Călata near Brăișoru. Its length is 7 km (4.3 mi) and its basin size is 10 km^{2} (3.9 sq mi).
