= Joseph Calata =

Filipino businessman

- Born: July 31, 1980 (age 45); Plaridel, Bulacan
- Other names: Josh
- Occupation: Businessman

Joseph Calata (born July 31, 1980) is a Filipino businessman who served as the chairman and chief executive officer of Calata Corporation, a company formerly listed on the Philippine Stock Exchange. He attended De La Salle University and finished with a Bachelor's degree in Management of Financial Institutions.

== Life and career ==
Calata at the age of 31 became the youngest chairman and CEO of a publicly listed company in the history of the Philippine Stock Exchange when Calata Corporation (CAL) had its initial public offering in 2012 with a value of ₱2.7 billion. CAL was among the few select 200 companies that were able to list in the PSE.

== Calata Corporation ==
CAL is primarily involved in livestock and agricultural business. On February 6, 2012, the Company amended its primary purpose as a prelude to its plans to create a subsidiary to handle its retail business, and on the same year had its first IPO.

CAL has three operating segments namely, distribution, retail, and farming. CAL currently distributes agro-products, animal feeds, fertilizers, agro-chemicals, seeds, soya, meat, and swine livestock. Meanwhile, the Company’s retail operation is carried out through Agri Phil Corporation, a wholly owned subsidiary. Agri Phil is engaged in the trade of feeds, agrochemicals, veterinary medicine, fertilizers and seeds. Lastly, for its farming segment, CAL undertook several projects, namely, Swine Livestock Breeder Farm, Broiler Breeder Farm, Broiler Growing Farm, and Swine Livestock Growing Farm.

== Controversies ==
Calata Corporation was ordered to be delisted by the Philippine Stock Exchange on November 3, 2017 for violations of PSE Disclosure and Delisting Rules.

On April 14, 2015, the Bureau of Internal Revenue filed a case against Joseph Calata for failure to supply correct and accurate information in his annual income tax return for 2011 with a tax liability of ₱144.49 million. The case was dismissed on June 8, 2016 by the Department of Justice for insufficiency of evidence.

== Awards ==
In 2015, Calata won the Next Generation Global Franchise Leader award held at the International Franchise Association Franchise Convention, USA.

== Philanthropy ==
Calata donated ₱2 million to his alma mater, De La Salle University for its Agrivet Science Institute (AGSI) scholarship fund.

He was one of the major investors for a training program offered by the Child Protection Network Foundation (CPN) and the University of the Philippines-Philippine General Hospital Child Protection Unit (PGH-CPU) which aims to equip participants with the proper knowledge, competence, and attitude in child abuse diagnosis and intervention.
