= Călățele =

- Commune
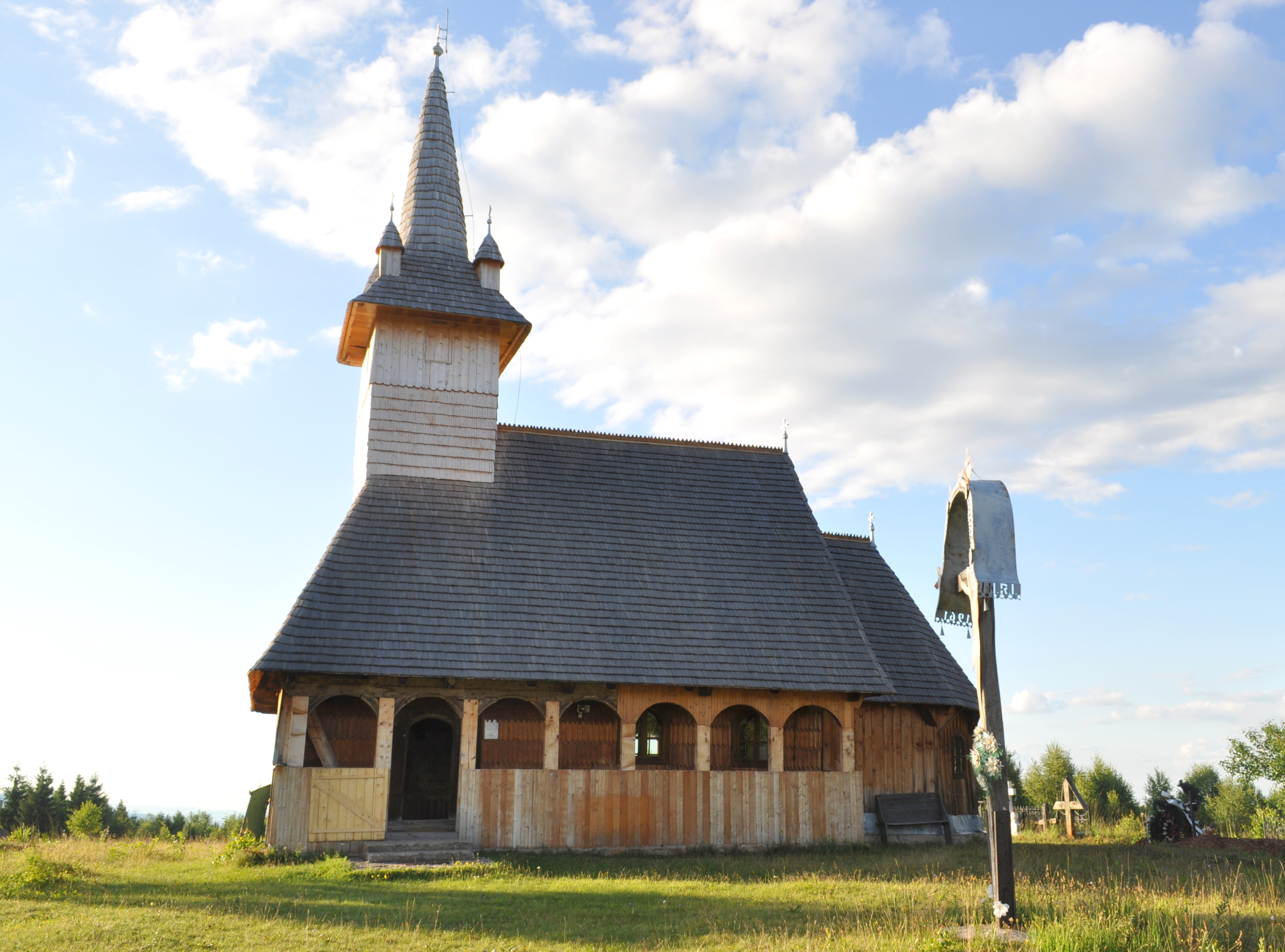
- Wooden church in Dealu Negru (2011)

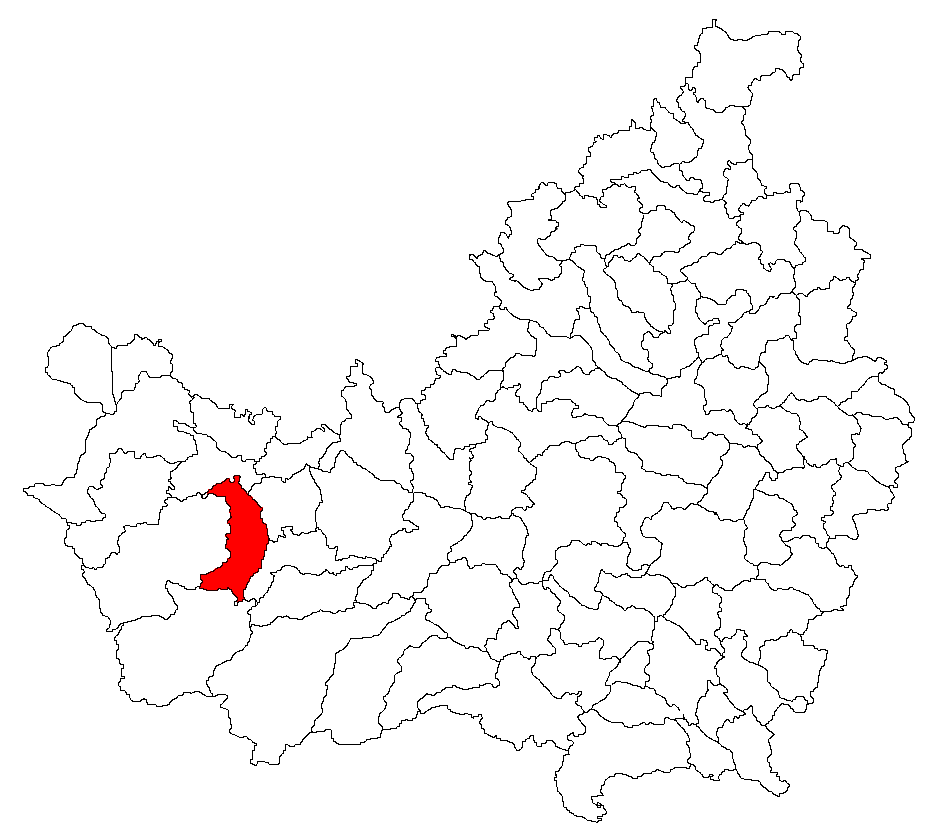
- Location in Cluj County

- Location in Romania
- Coordinates: 46°45′50″N 23°00′30″E
- Country: Romania
- County: Cluj
- Established: 1408
- Subdivisions: Călata, Călățele, Călățele-Pădure, Dealu Negru, Finciu, Văleni

Government
  - Mayor (2020–2024): Vasile Tripon (PNL)
- Area: 74.69 km^{2} (28.84 sq mi)
- Elevation: 704 m (2,310 ft)
- Population (2021-12-01): 2,307
  - Density: 30.89/km^{2} (80.00/sq mi)
- Time zone: UTC+02:00 (EET)
  - Summer (DST): UTC+03:00 (EEST)
- Postal code: 407135
- Area code: +(40) x64
- Vehicle reg.: CJ
- Website: www.primariacalatele.ro

Călățele (Hungarian: Kiskalota; German: Kelezel) is a commune in Cluj County, Transylvania, Romania. It is composed of six villages: Călata (Nagykalota), Călățele, Călățele-Pădure, Dealu Negru (Bánffytelep), Finciu (Kalotaújfalu), and Văleni (Magyarvalkó).

== Geography ==
The commune is situated in the northern foothills of the Apuseni Mountains, at an altitude of 704 m (2,310 ft), on the banks of the river Călata. It is located in the western part of the county, in the Țara Călatei historical region of Transylvania, 15 km (9.3 mi) south of Huedin and 60 km (37 mi) west of the county seat, Cluj-Napoca.

Călățele is crossed by national road DN1R, which connects it to Huedin and DN1 to the north and to Albac and DN75 to the south.

== Demographics ==
Historical population
Year	Pop.	±%
1850	2,124	—
1880	2,479	+16.7%
1890	2,792	+12.6%
1900	4,139	+48.2%
1910	3,377	−18.4%
1920	3,729	+10.4%
1930	4,147	+11.2%
1941	4,647	+12.1%
1956	4,154	−10.6%
1966	4,139	−0.4%
1977	3,791	−8.4%
1992	2,906	−23.3%
2002	2,671	−8.1%
2011	2,243	−16.0%
2021	2,307	+2.9%
Source: Census data

According to the census from 2002, there was a total population of 2,671 people living in this commune. Of this population, 80.98% were ethnic Romanians, 10.14% ethnic Hungarians, and 8.64% ethnic Roma. At the 2011 census, there were 2,243 inhabitants, of which 77.66% were Romanians, 10.88% Hungarians, and 8.34% Roma. At the 2021 census, Călățele had a population of 2,307; of those, 62.29% were Romanians, 16.91% Roma, and 8.67% Hungarians.

== Natives ==
- Corvin Radovici (1931 – 2017), chess player, International Master
- Alexandru Roșca (1906 – 1996), psychologist and academic
