= Hungarian Cultural Days of Cluj =

Cultural events held by the Hungarian minority of the city of Cluj-Napoca in Romania

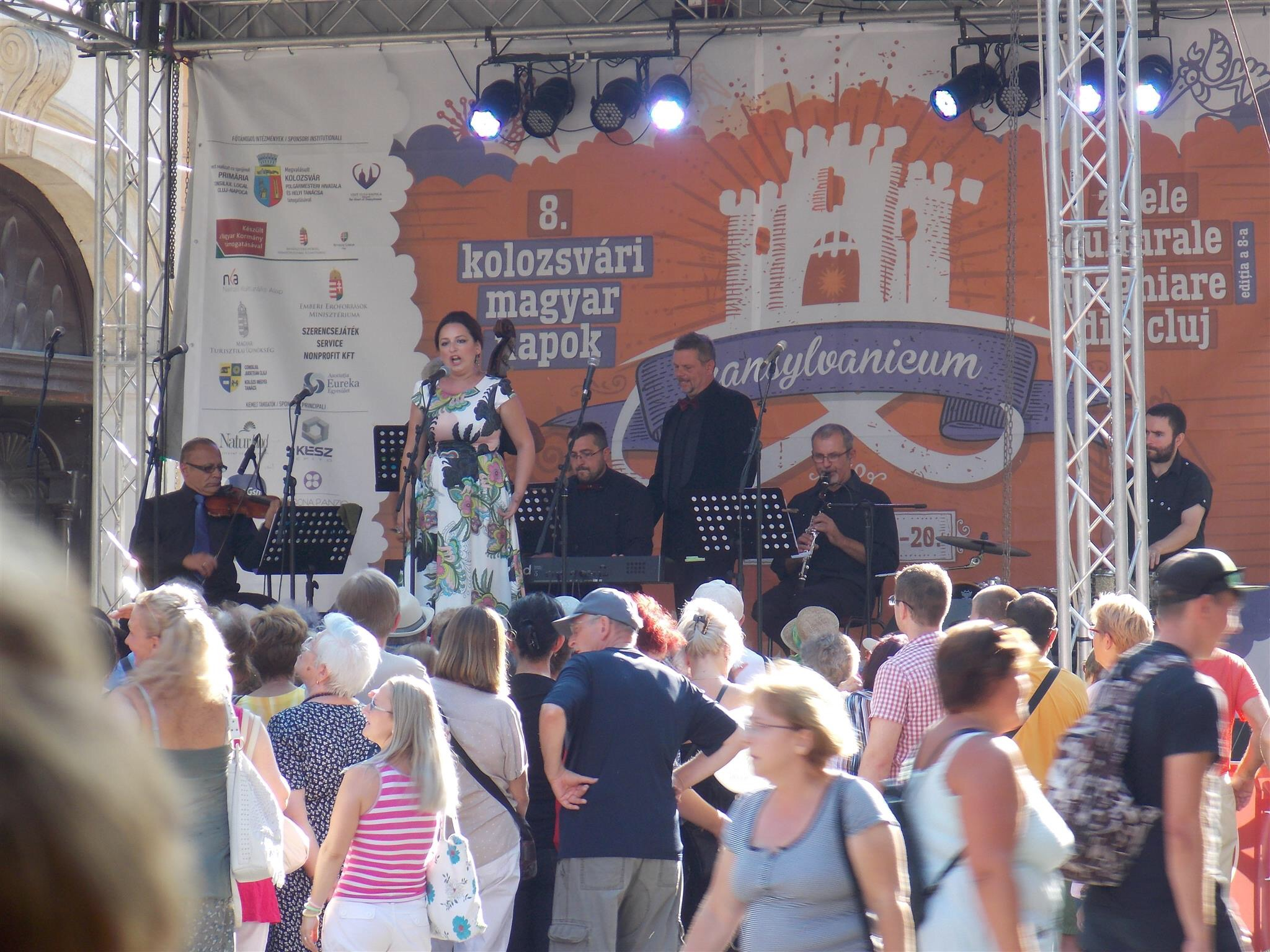
Celebrations during the Hungarian Cultural Days of Cluj on the Mihail Kogălniceanu Street (or Farkas Utca Street in Hungarian)

The Hungarian Cultural Days of Cluj (Hungarian: Kolozsvári Magyar Napok; Romanian: Zilele Culturale Maghiare din Cluj) is the largest Hungarian festival in Transylvania. It occurs annually on 19 August, being the date when Cluj-Napoca (Hungarian: Kolozsvár) reached city status, and on 20 August, king St. Stephen's day, as well as the whole week around these.

The event has been organized since 2010 by the Treasure Cluj Association (Hungarian: Kincses Kolozsvár Egyesület) in partnership with other organizations.

The participants can choose from guided tours, exhibitions, book launches, commemorations, theater plays, movies, fair, food tasting, drinks workshop, classical and contemporary concerts, parties, activities for youth, family and children, board game circles, ancient tents, handicraft workshops, as well as literary, artistic, historical, social and other conversations, that run simultaneously in a large number of locations. The main language of the event is Hungarian, though some programs are held additionally in Romanian and English.

== See also ==
- Hungarians in Romania
