= Huedin =

Huedin Bánffyhunyad
- Town
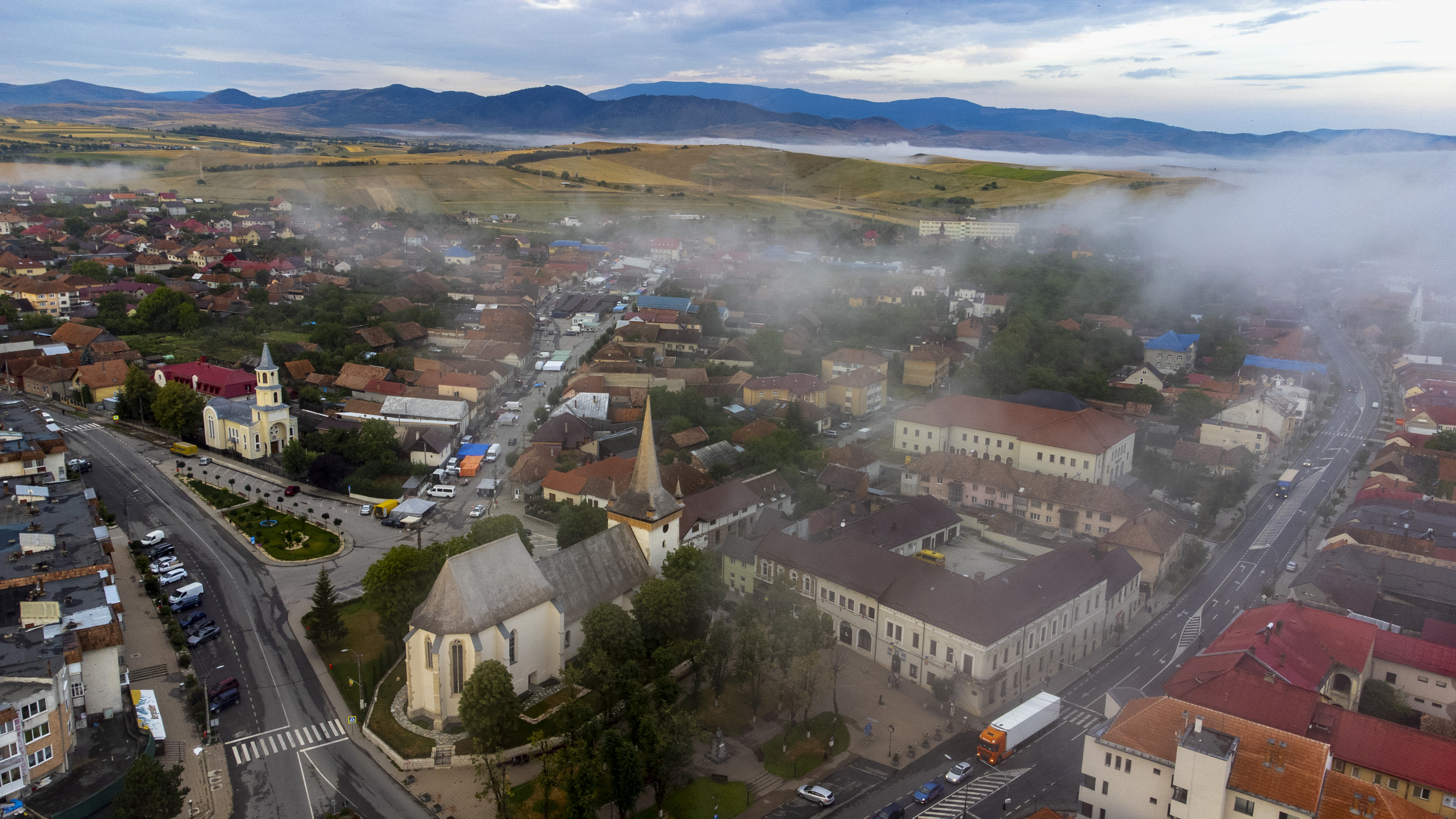
- Aerial view of Huedin

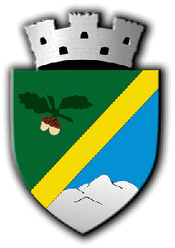
- Flag Coat of arms

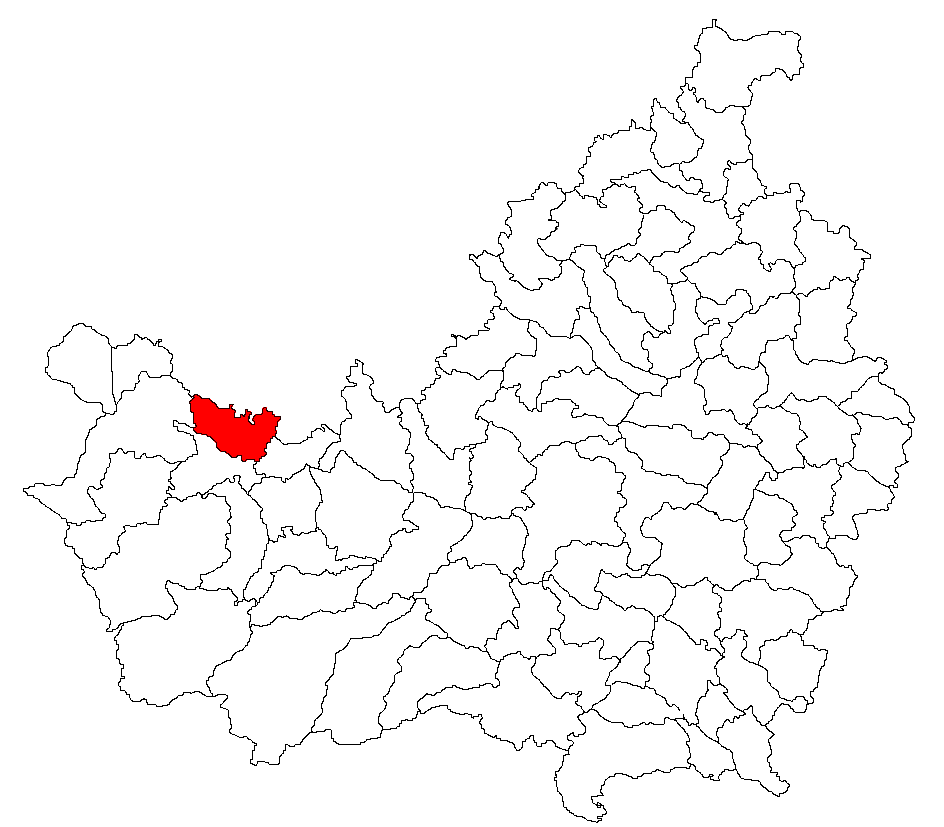
- Location in Cluj County

- Location in Romania
- Coordinates: 46°52′12″N 23°1′48″E
- Country: Romania
- County: Cluj

Government
  - Mayor (2024–2028): Mircea Moroșan (PNL)
- Area: 61.24 km^{2} (23.64 sq mi)
- Elevation: 556 m (1,824 ft)
- Population (2021-12-01): 8,069
  - Density: 131.8/km^{2} (341.3/sq mi)
- Time zone: UTC+02:00 (EET)
  - Summer (DST): UTC+03:00 (EEST)
- Postal code: 405400
- Area code: +40 x64
- Vehicle reg.: CJ
- Website: www.primariahuedin.ro

Huedin (Hungarian: Bánffyhunyad, Hungarian pronunciation: [ˈbaːnfihuɲɒd]; German: Heynod; Yiddish: הוניוד or הוניאד) is a town in Cluj County, Transylvania, Romania.

Huedin is located at the northern edge of the Apuseni Mountains. It is surrounded by the villages of Nearșova, Domoșu, Horlacea, and others. The town administers one village, Bicălatu (Magyarbikal). Lately, Huedin has started to be known for its ecotourism initiatives.

== Population ==
Historical population
Year	Pop.	±%
1850	1,939	—
1880	3,152	+62.6%
1890	3,666	+16.3%
1900	4,482	+22.3%
1910	5,194	+15.9%
1920	4,890	−5.9%
1930	5,401	+10.4%
1941	5,121	−5.2%
1948	5,134	+0.3%
1966	7,834	+52.6%
1977	8,378	+6.9%
1992	9,961	+18.9%
2002	9,955	−0.1%
2011	9,346	−6.1%
2021	8,069	−13.7%
Source: Census data

At the 2021 census, Huedin had a population of 8,069. The 2011 census data of the town's population counted 9,346 people, of which 59.32% were ethnic Romanians, 28.88% ethnic Hungarians, and 11.45% ethnic Roma.

== History ==
The town of Huedin was founded in the Middle Ages. It is home to a 13th-century Gothic Reformed Church. From 1330 up until 1848, the landlords of the town were the Bánffy family, whence the town's Hungarian name of Bánffyhunyad. The town was part of the Kingdom of Hungary. In 1526, Huedin became part of the Principality of Transylvania and, until 1867, of the Grand Duchy of Transylvania.

The town boasts a strong historical Hungarian heritage. On September 26, 1895, Emperor Franz Joseph visited Bánffyhunyad following the end of Hungarian Army manoeuvres in Transylvania and was given an enthusiastic welcome by the townspeople, who built an arch decorated with the region's flowers and plants for the occasion. In 1910, the town's population was 5,194, of whom 90.5% spoke Hungarian. At that time, 57.5% were Calvinist, 20.7% Jewish, and 10% Roman Catholic.

After the collapse of Austria-Hungary at the end of World War I, and the declaration of the Union of Transylvania with Romania, the Romanian Army took control of Huedin in December 1918, during the Hungarian–Romanian War. The town officially became part of the territory ceded to the Kingdom of Romania in June 1920 under the terms of the Treaty of Trianon. During the interwar period, the town was the headquarters of plasa Huedin, within Cluj County. In August 1940, under the auspices of Nazi Germany, which imposed the Second Vienna Award, Hungary retook the territory of Northern Transylvania (which included Huedin) from Romania. Towards the end of World War II, however, the town was taken back from Hungarian and German troops by Romanian and Soviet forces in October 1944. After 1950, the town became the headquarters of Huedin raion within the Cluj Region. Following the administrative reform of 1968, Huedin became once more part of Cluj County.

== Natives ==
- Samu Balázs (1906–1981), actor
- Dezideriu Horvath (born 1970), speed skater
- Atilla Kiss B. (born 1963), operatic tenor
- Zsigmond Kolozsvári (1899–1983), painter, graphic designer, and sculptor

== Accessibility ==
The town is accessible by CFR trains from Cluj-Napoca and other cities, such as Oradea, Timișoara, Satu Mare, Brașov, Ploiești, Bucharest, and Budapest. The Huedin railway station serves the CFR Line 300, which connects Bucharest to the Hungarian border near Oradea.

== Images ==
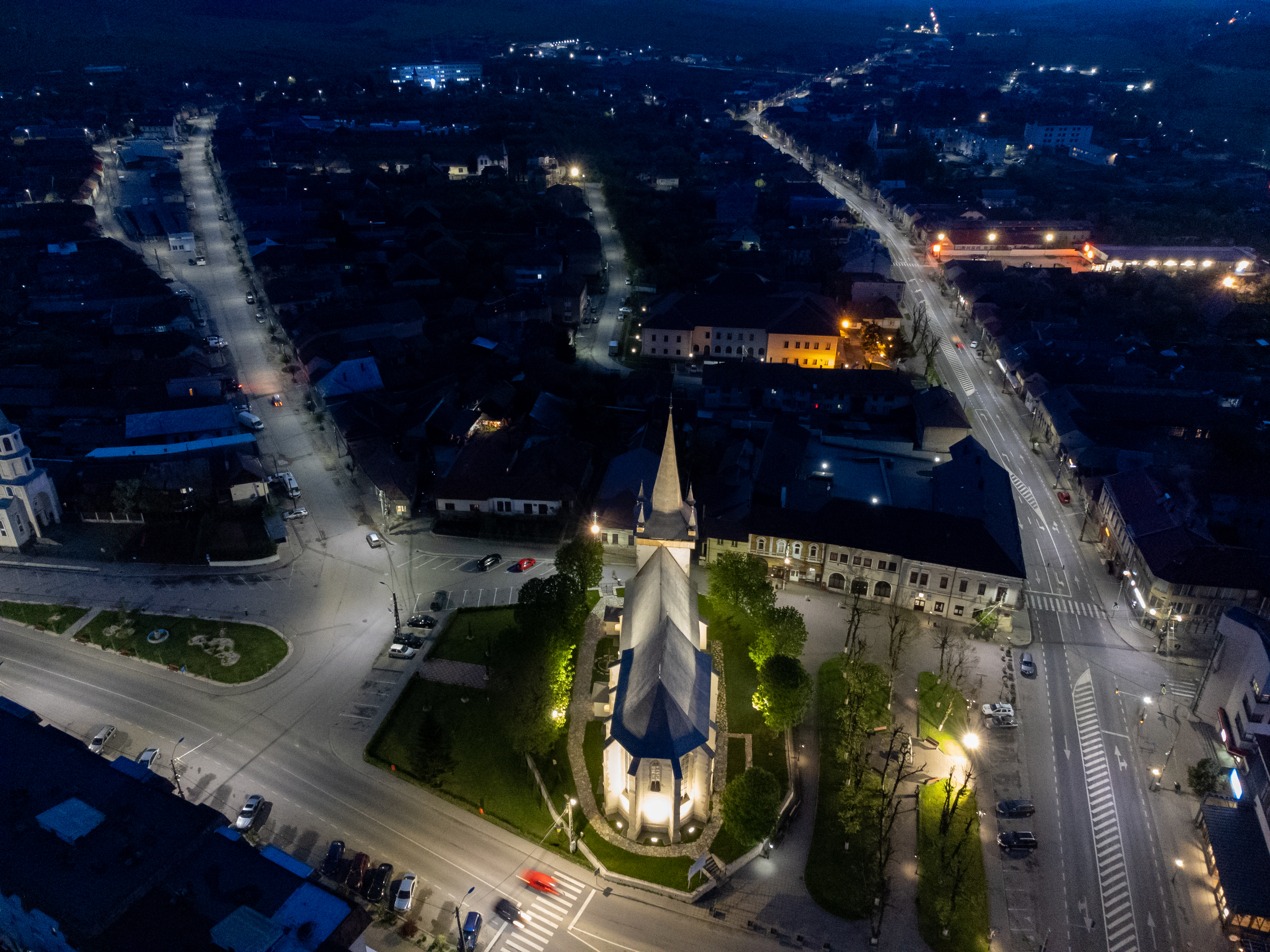

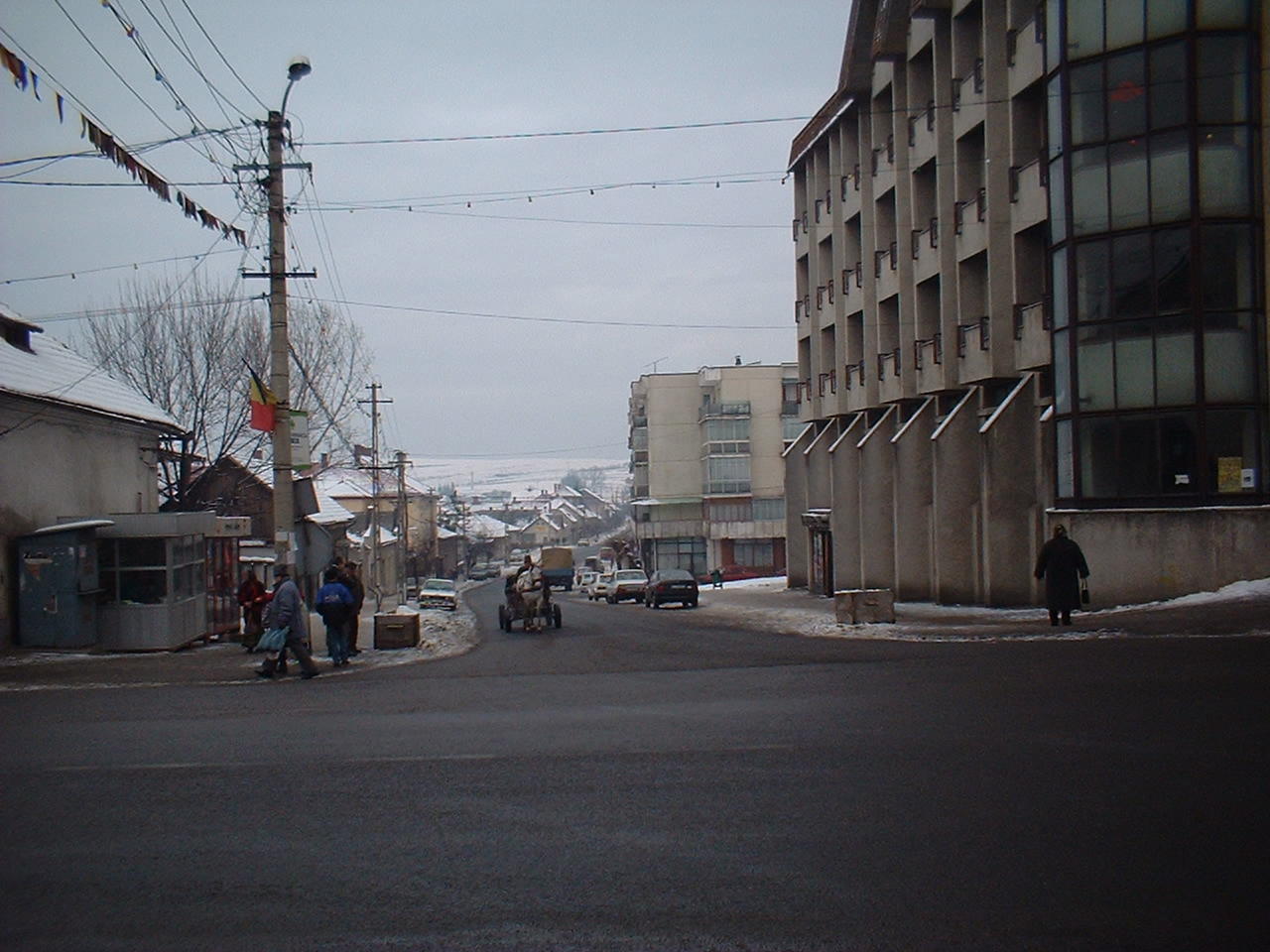
View from Huedin

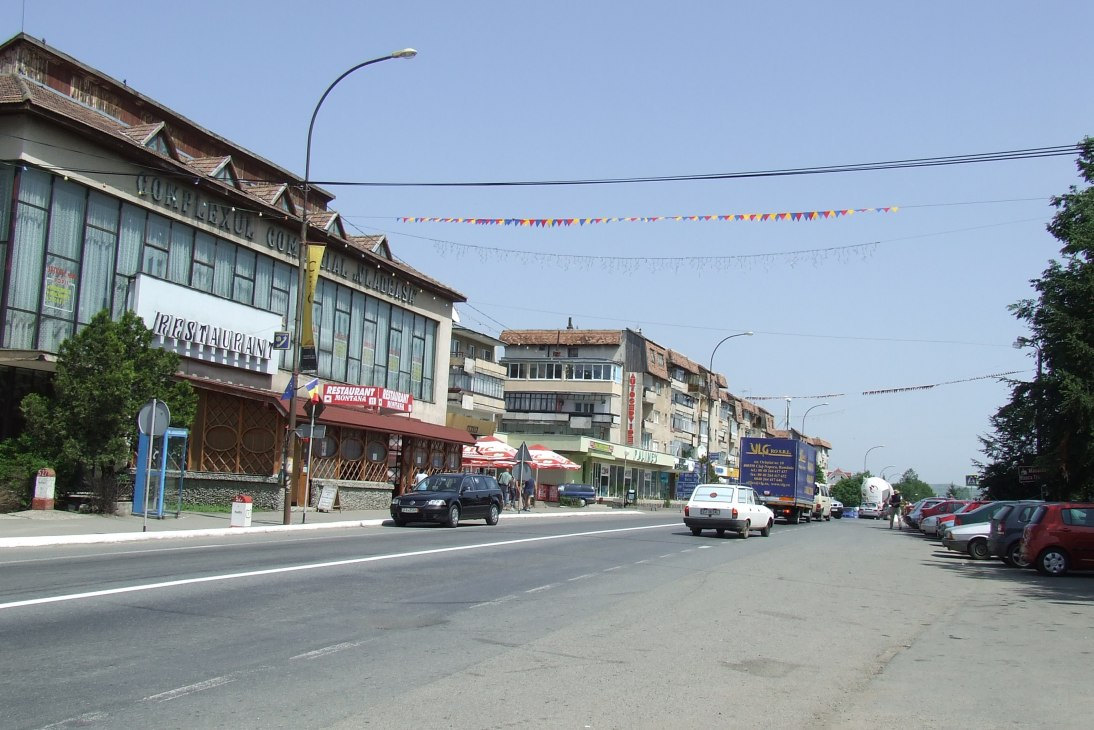
View from Huedin

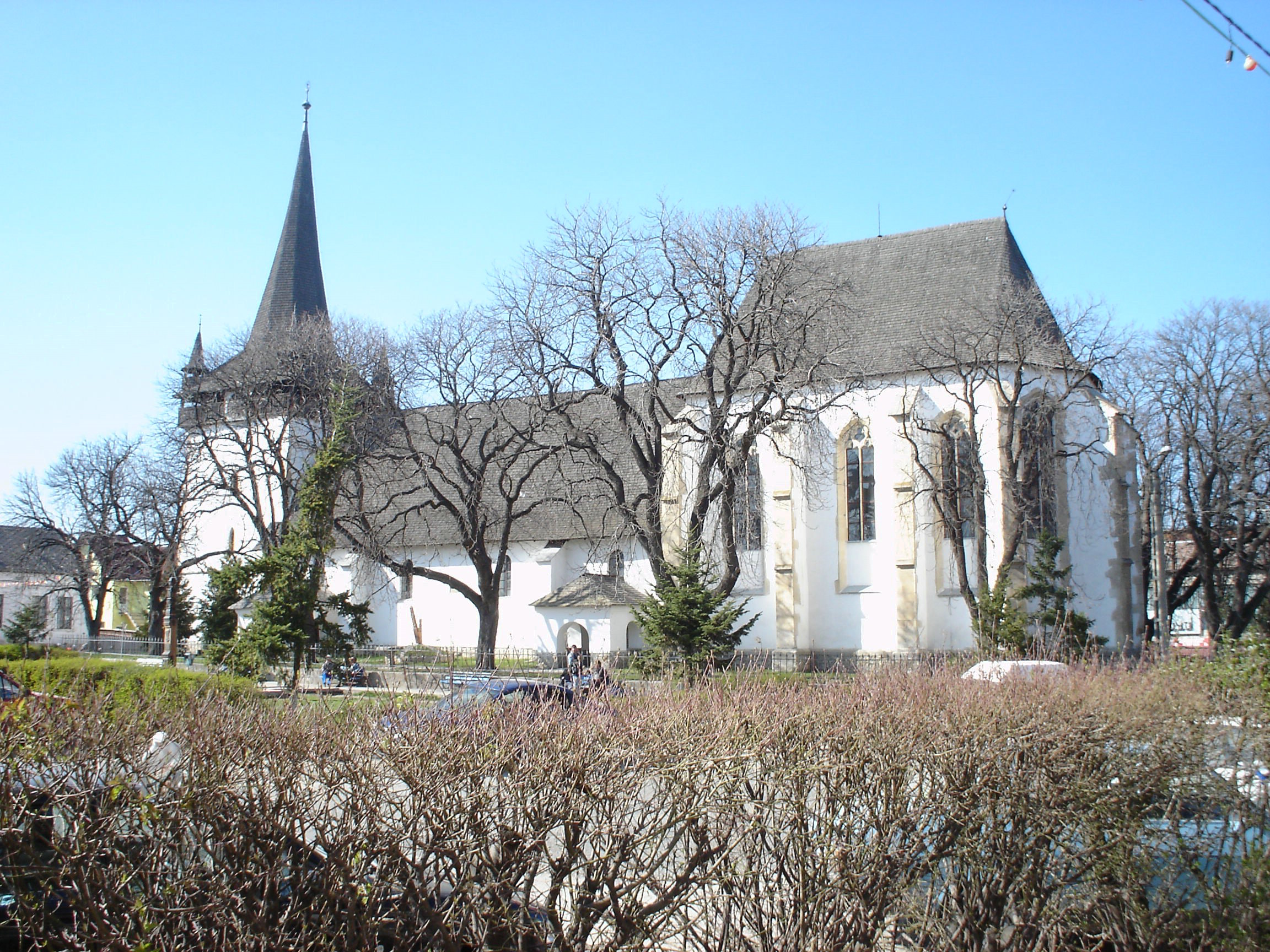
Reformed church in Huedin

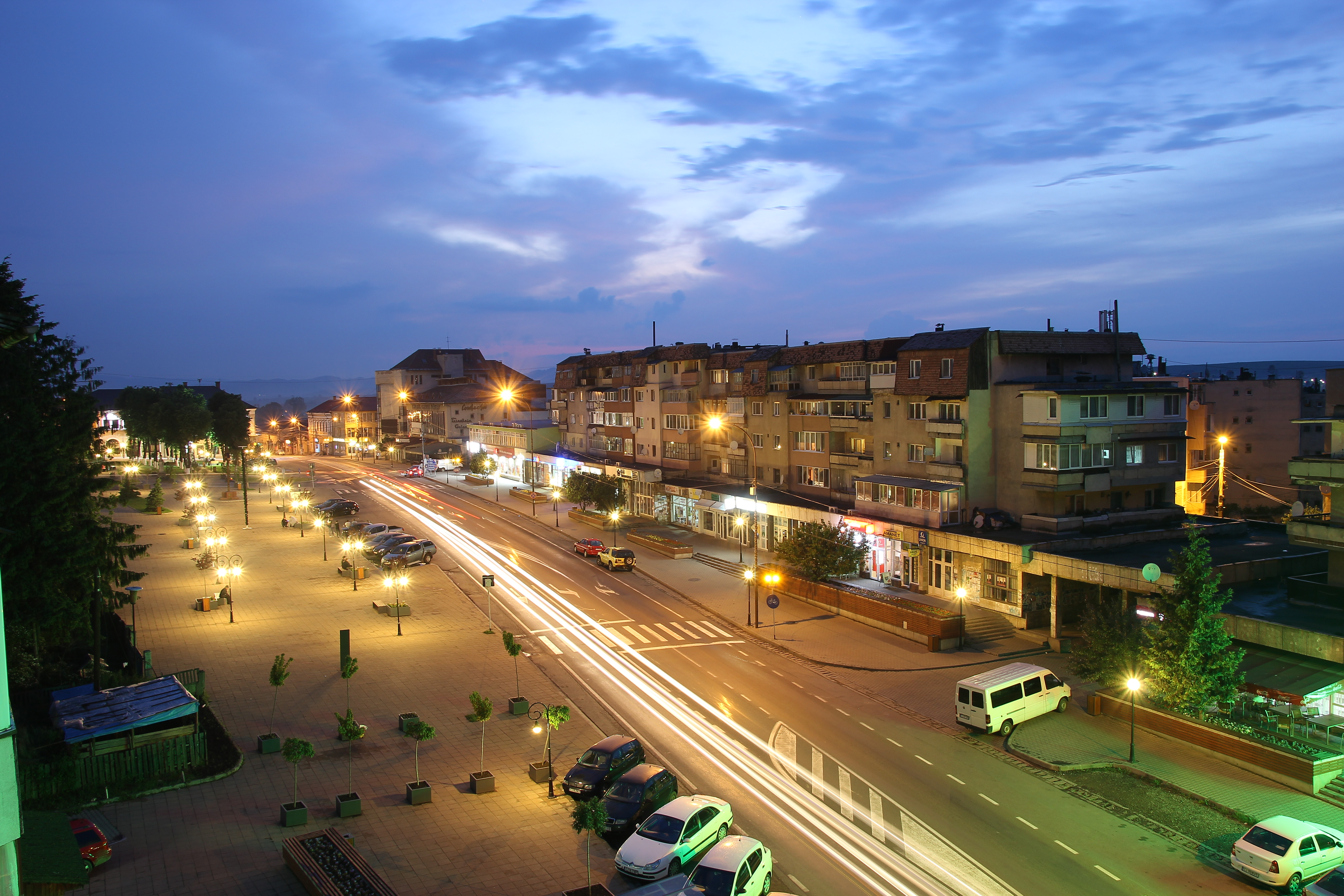

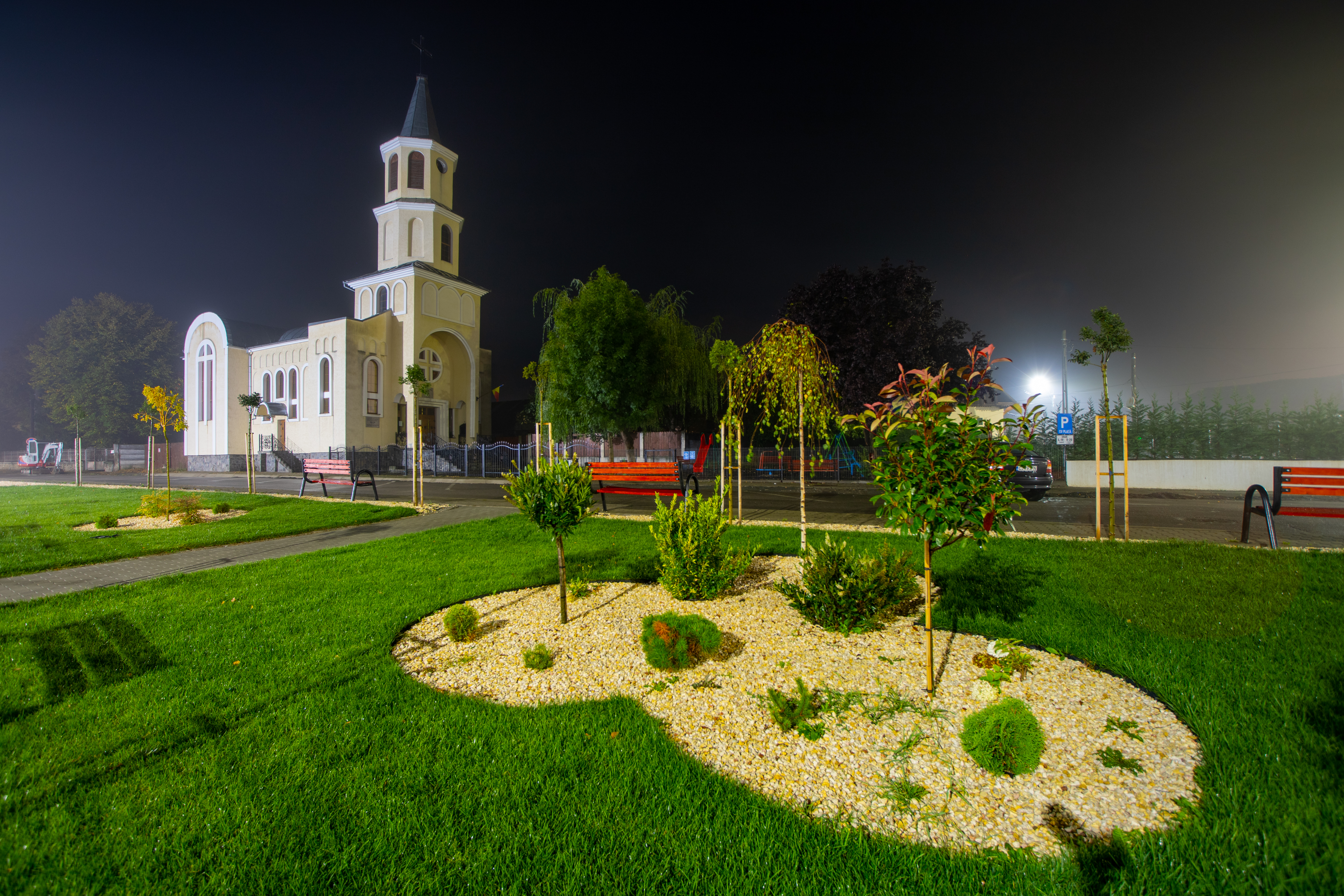

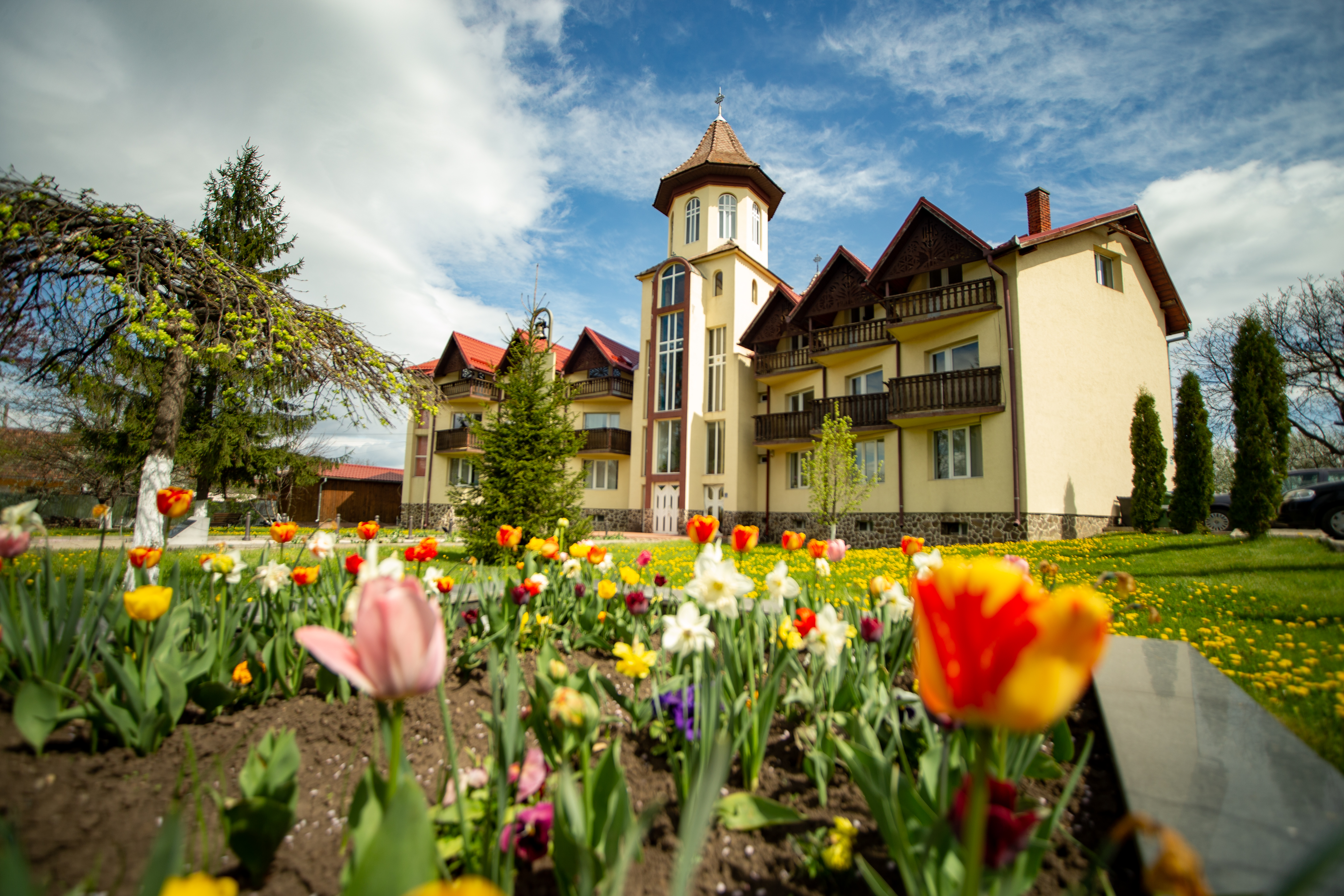

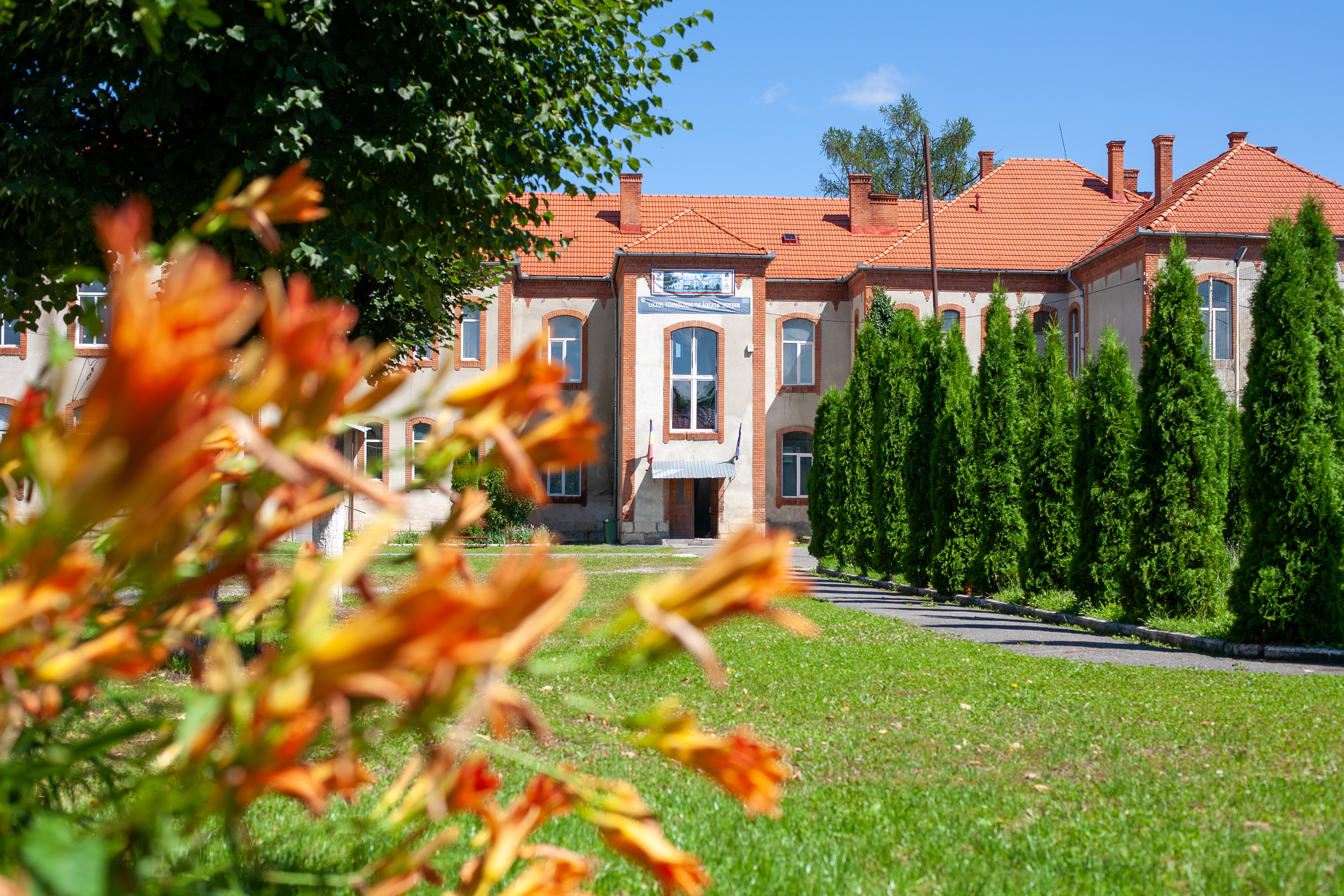
