= Mănăstireni =

- Commune
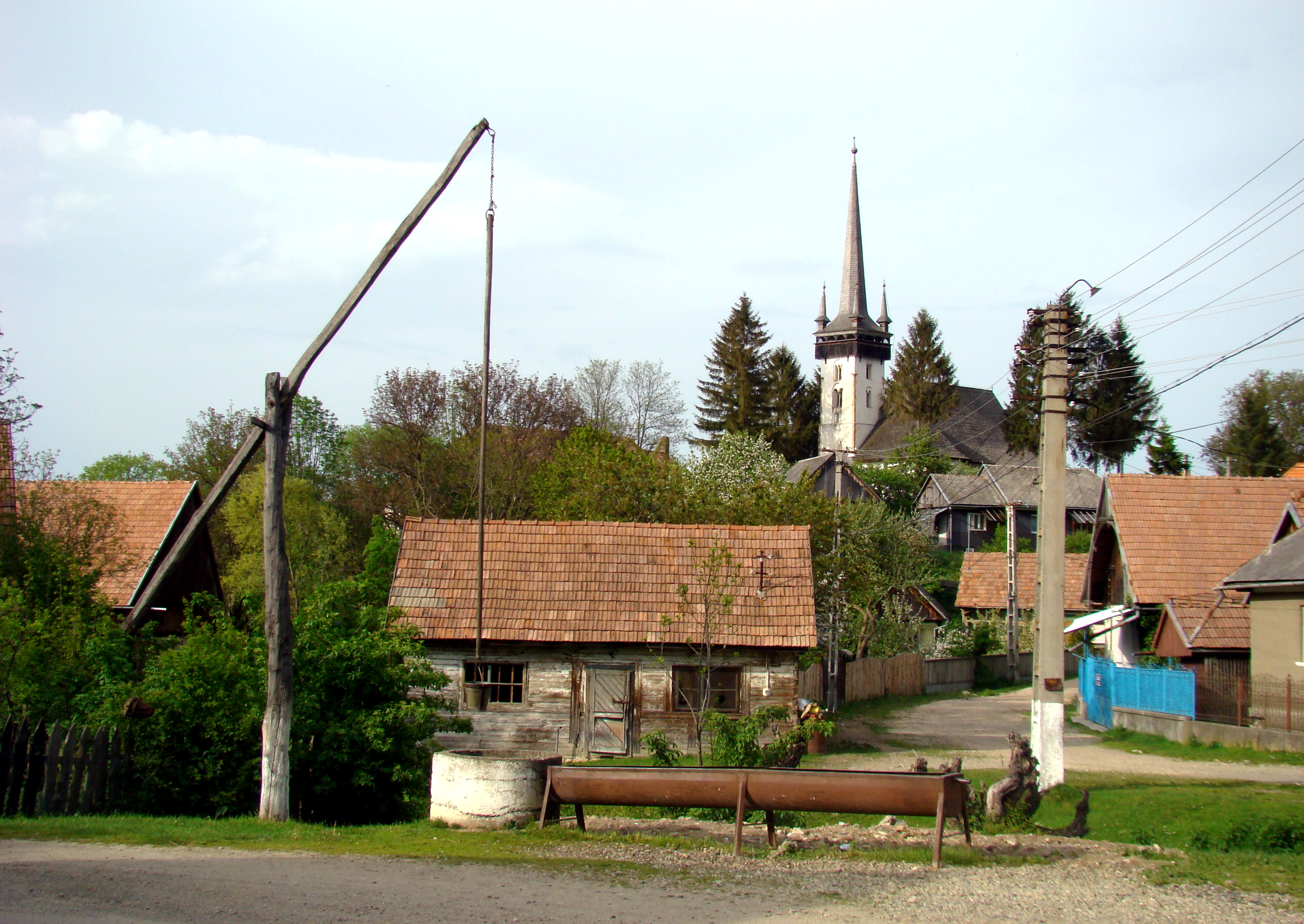
- Calvinist church in Mănăstireni

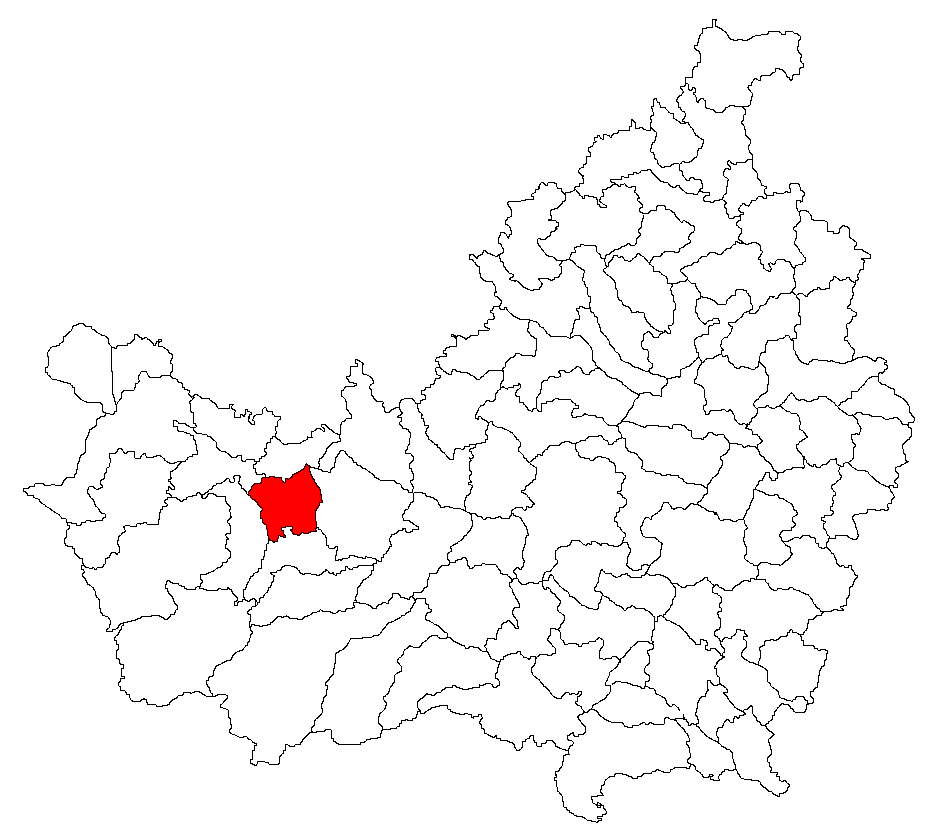
- Location in Cluj County

- Location in Romania
- Coordinates: 46°46′53″N 23°4′59″E
- Country: Romania
- County: Cluj
- Subdivisions: Ardeova, Bedeciu, Bica, Dretea, Mănăstireni, Mănășturu Românesc

Government
  - Mayor (2024–2028): Ioan Condor (PSD)
- Area: 63 km^{2} (24 sq mi)
- Elevation: 727 m (2,385 ft)
- Population (2021-12-01): 1,174
  - Density: 19/km^{2} (48/sq mi)
- Time zone: UTC+02:00 (EET)
  - Summer (DST): UTC+03:00 (EEST)
- Postal code: 407370
- Area code: (+40) 0264
- Vehicle reg.: CJ

Mănăstireni (Hungarian: Magyargyerőmonostor; German: Ungarisch-Klosterdorf) is a commune in Cluj County, Transylvania, Romania, located on the Căpuș River. It is composed of six villages: Ardeova (Erdőfalva), Bedeciu (Bedecs), Bica (Kalotabikal), Dretea (Deréte), Mănăstireni, and Mănășturu Românesc (Felsőgyerőmonostor).

The commune is known for its churches, some of them made in wood.

== Demographics ==
Historical population
Year	Pop.	±%
1850	3,839	—
1880	4,638	+20.8%
1890	5,141	+10.8%
1900	5,547	+7.9%
1910	6,202	+11.8%
1920	6,227	+0.4%
1930	4,893	−21.4%
1941	4,762	−2.7%
1956	4,126	−13.4%
1966	3,383	−18.0%
1977	2,972	−12.1%
1992	2,227	−25.1%
2002	1,809	−18.8%
2011	1,481	−18.1%
2021	1,174	−20.7%
Source: Census data

According to the census from 2002 there was a total population of 1,809 people living in this commune; of this population, 85.90% were ethnic Romanians, 10.94% ethnic Hungarians, and 3.15% ethnic Roma. A the 2021 census, Mănăstireni had a population of 1,174; of those, 75.3% were Romanians, 10.82% Hungarians, and 2.9% Roma.

== Picture gallery ==
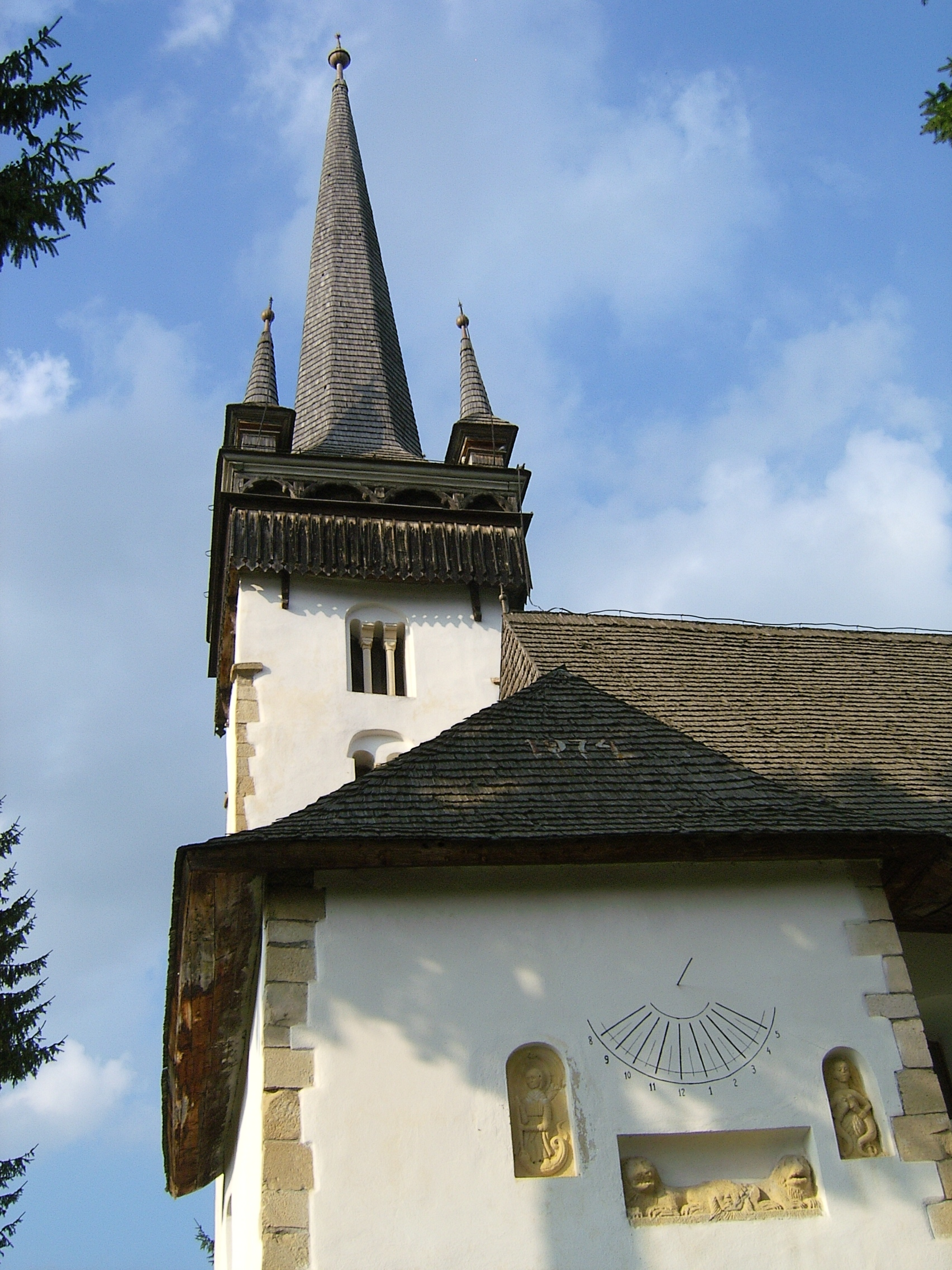

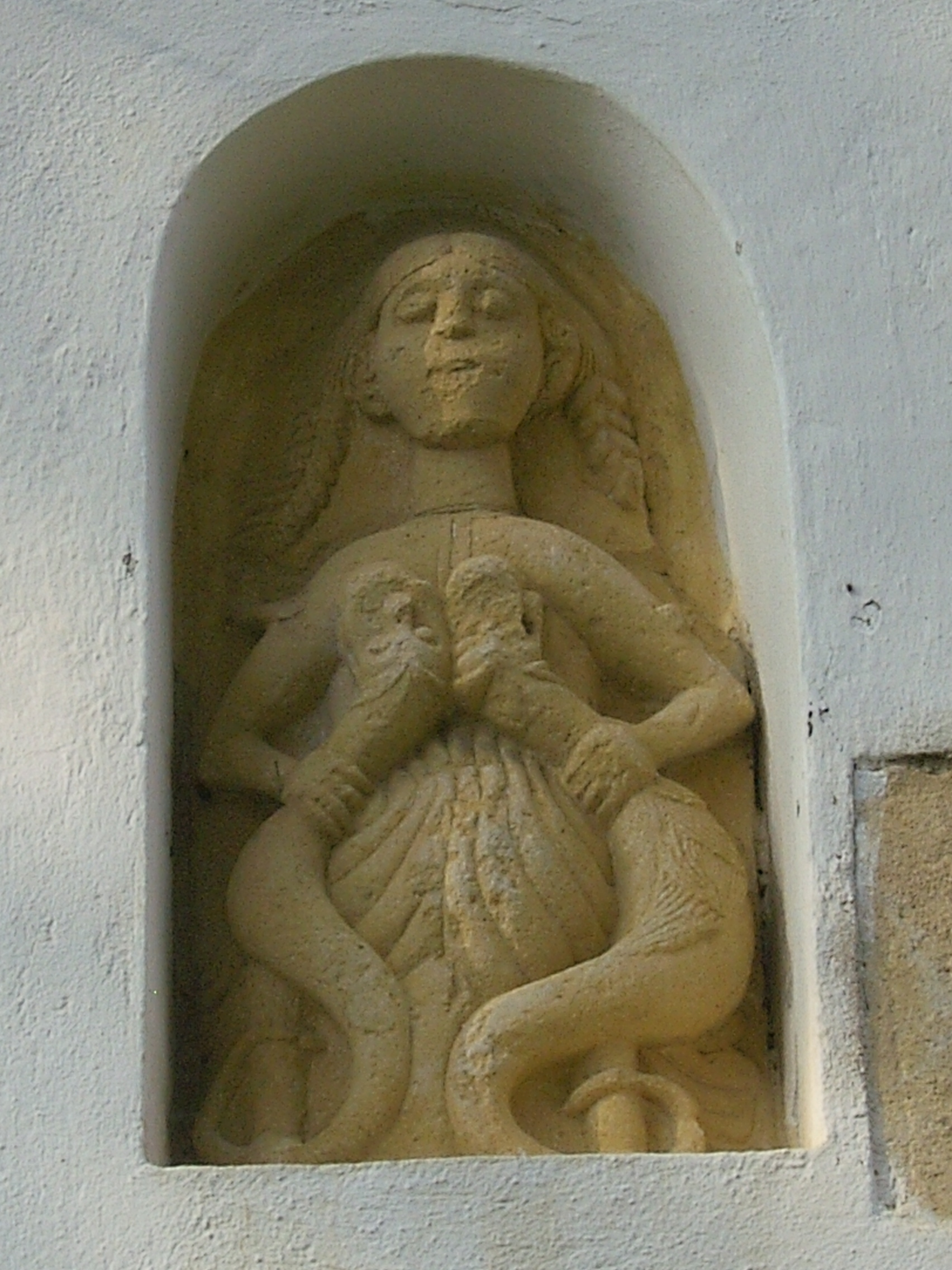

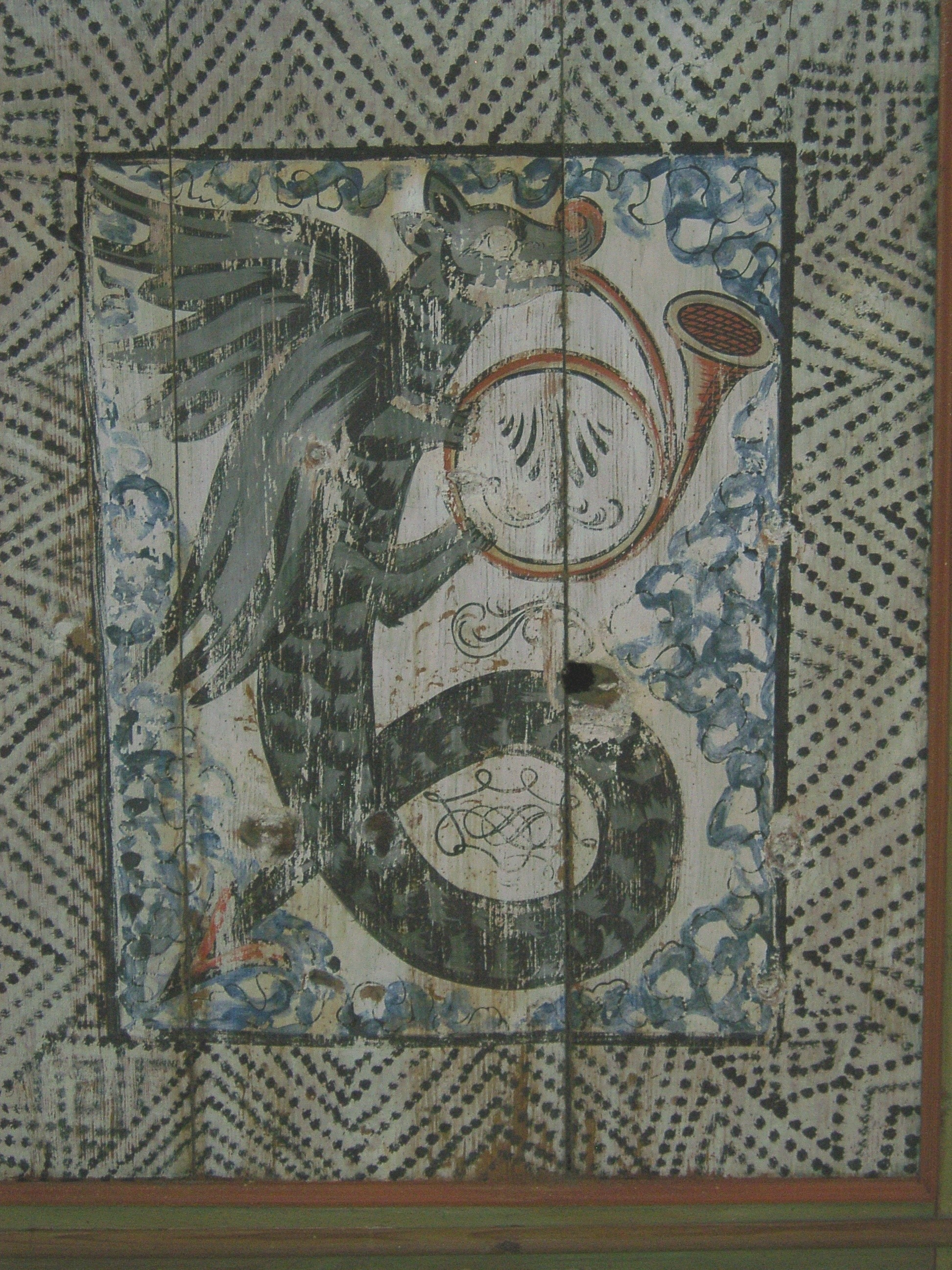

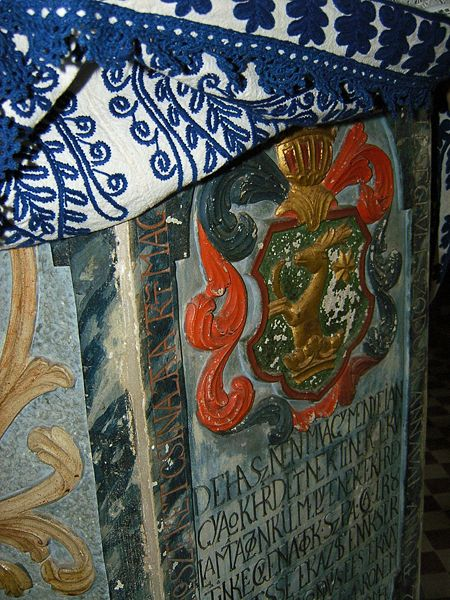

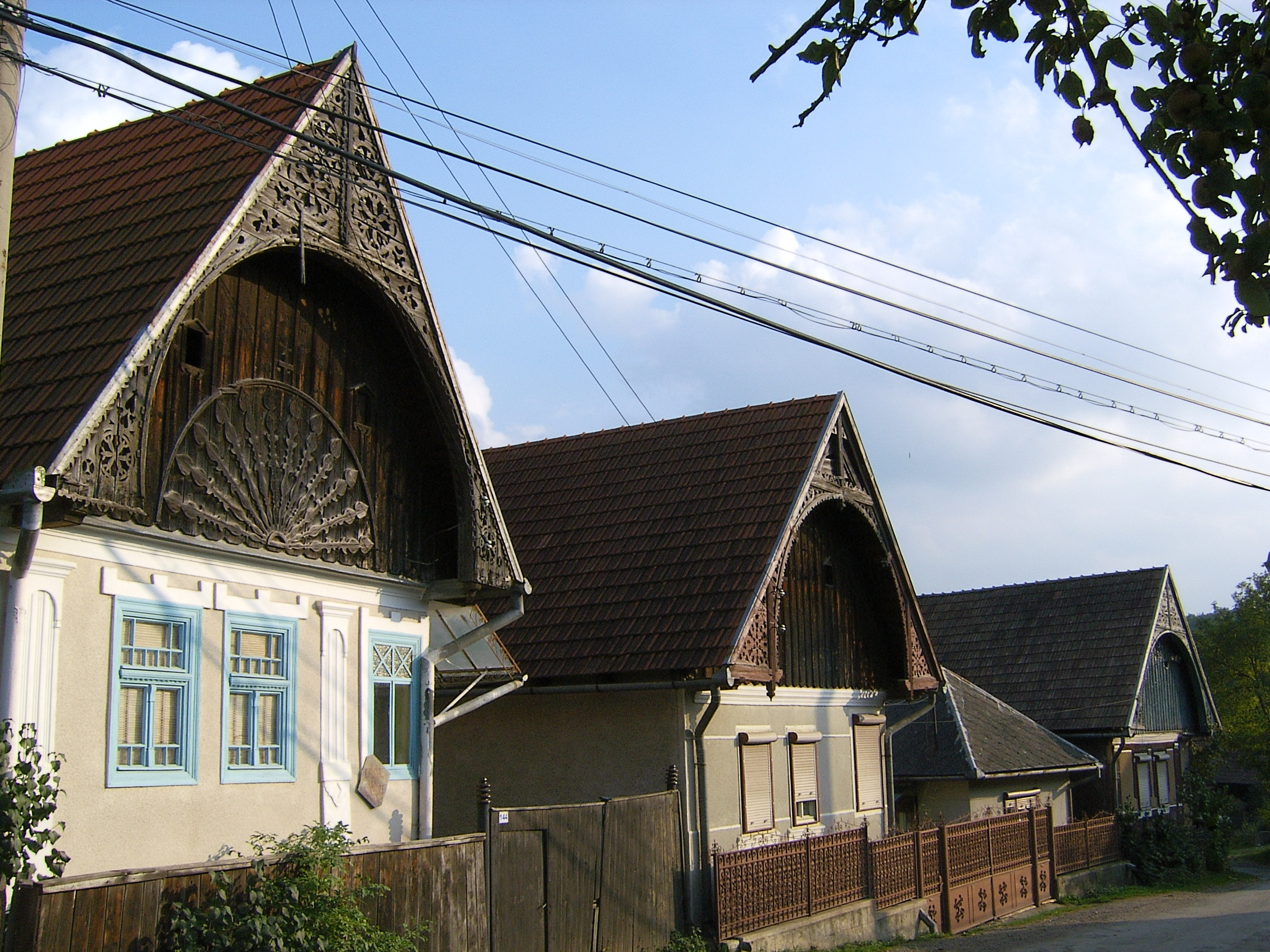

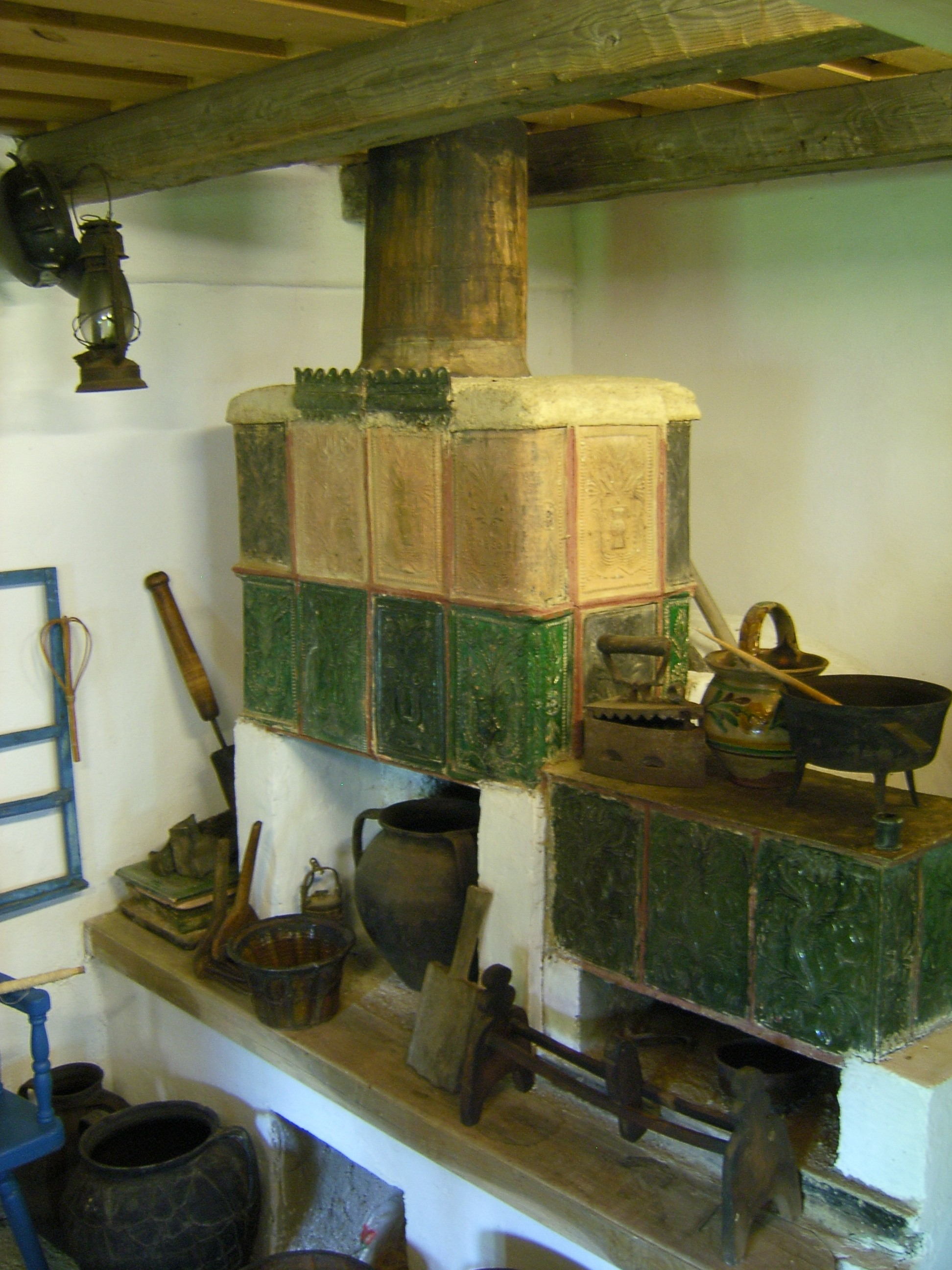

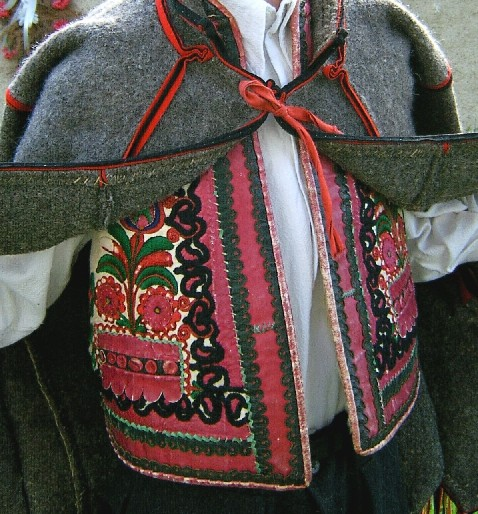
