= Sâncraiu =

Sâncraiu Kalotaszentkirály
- Commune
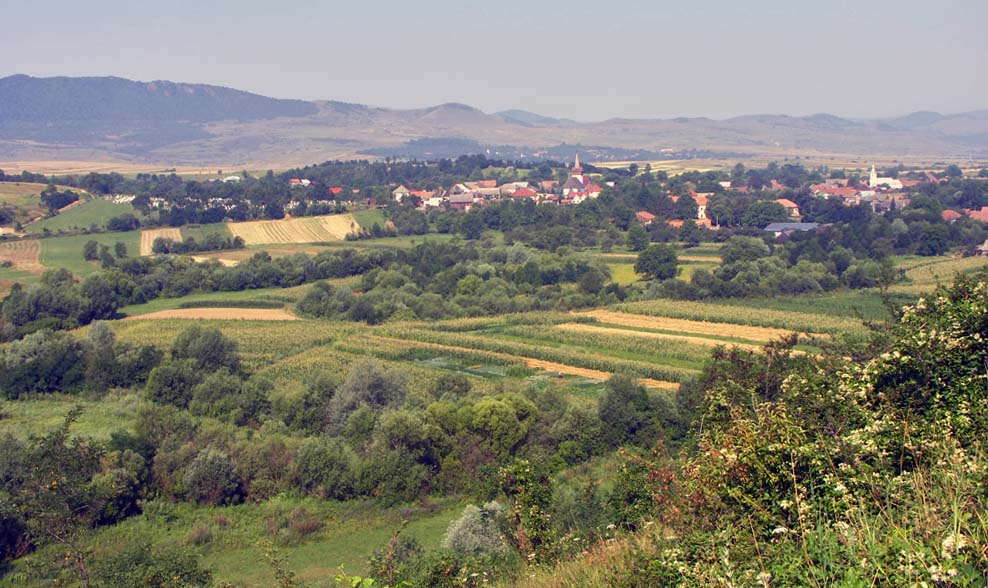
- Sâncraiu

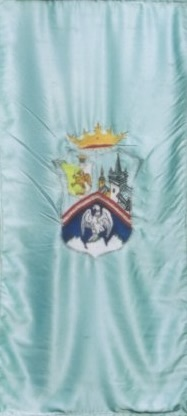
- Flag

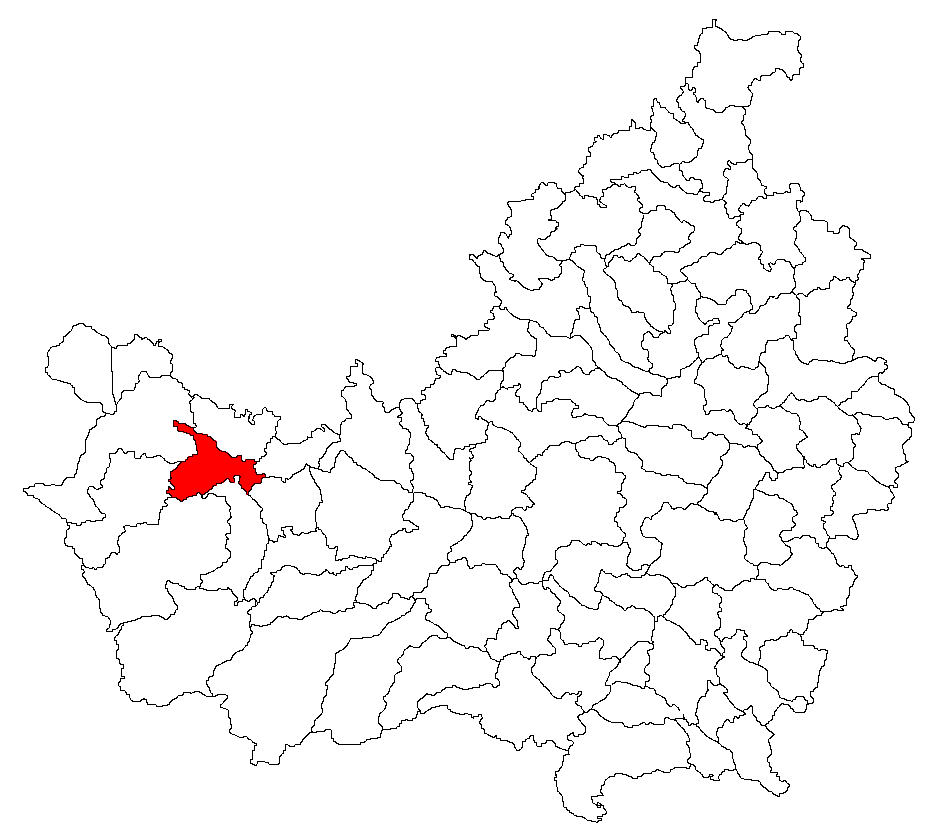
- Location in Cluj County

- Location in Romania
- Coordinates: 46°49′47″N 22°59′18″E
- Country: Romania
- County: Cluj
- Subdivisions: Alunișu, Brăișoru, Domoșu, Horlacea, Sâncraiu

Government
  - Mayor (2020–2024): Andrei Poka (UDMR)
- Area: 56.83 km^{2} (21.94 sq mi)
- Elevation: 597 m (1,959 ft)
- Population (2021-12-01): 1,558
  - Density: 27.42/km^{2} (71.00/sq mi)
- Time zone: UTC+02:00 (EET)
  - Summer (DST): UTC+03:00 (EEST)
- Postal code: 407515
- Area code: +40 x64
- Vehicle reg.: CJ
- Website: www.sancraiu.ro

Sâncraiu (Kalotaszentkirály in Hungarian) is a commune in Cluj County, Transylvania, Romania.

The commune is located in the western part of the county, just south of Huedin and 58 km (36 mi) from the county seat, Cluj-Napoca.

== Villages ==
The commune is composed of five villages:

In Romanian	In Hungarian	In German
Alunișu	Magyarókereke	Mären
Brăișoru	Malomszeg	
Domoșu	Kalotadámos	Damesch
Horlacea	Jákótelke	Jakkesteig
Sâncraiu	Kalotaszentkirály	Heilkönig

== Population ==
At the 2011 census, 78.4% of inhabitants were Hungarians and 20.3% Romanians.

== Natives ==
- Sándor Keresztes (1919–2013), Hungarian diplomat and jurist
