= Aluniș, Cluj =

Commune in Cluj, Romania

Aluniș
- Commune
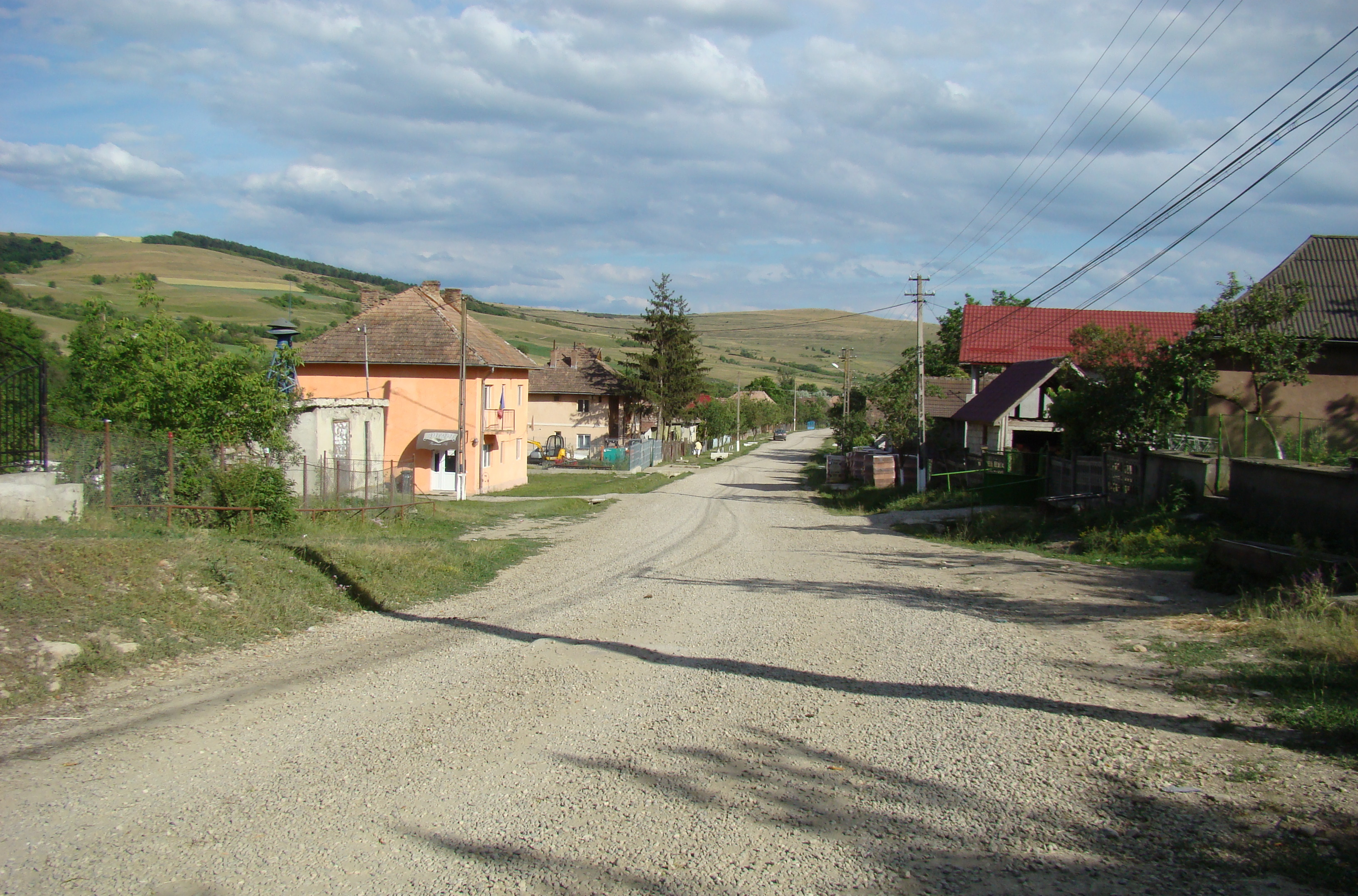
- Aluniș village

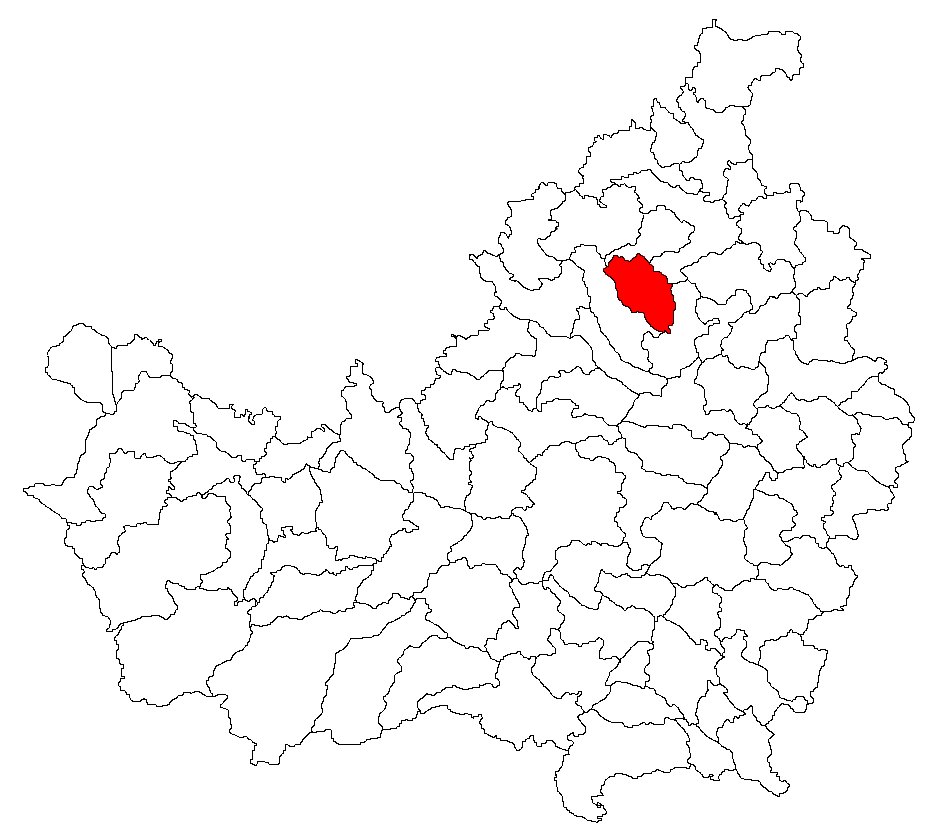
- Location in Cluj County

- Location in Romania
- Coordinates: 47°02′23″N 23°44′47″E
- Country: Romania
- County: Cluj
- Established: 1247
- Subdivisions: Aluniș, Corneni, Ghirolt, Pruneni, Vale

Government
  - Mayor (2020–2024): Mihai Sav (PNL)
- Area: 56.53 km^{2} (21.83 sq mi)
- Elevation: 343 m (1,125 ft)
- Population (2021-12-01): 1,018
  - Density: 18.01/km^{2} (46.64/sq mi)
- Time zone: UTC+02:00 (EET)
  - Summer (DST): UTC+03:00 (EEST)
- Postal code: 407030
- Area code: +40 x64
- Vehicle reg.: CJ
- Website: comunaalunis.ro

Aluniș (Hungarian: Kecsed; German: Pergelinsdorf) is a commune in Cluj County, Transylvania, Romania. It is composed of five villages: Aluniș, Corneni (Szilkerék), Ghirolt (Girolt), Pruneni (Kecsedszilvás), and Vale (Bánffytótfalu).

== Demographics ==
Historical population
Year	Pop.	±%
1850	2,241	—
1880	2,322	+3.6%
1890	2,493	+7.4%
1900	2,616	+4.9%
1910	2,690	+2.8%
1920	2,385	−11.3%
1930	2,760	+15.7%
1941	2,946	+6.7%
1956	3,427	+16.3%
1966	3,096	−9.7%
1977	2,550	−17.6%
1992	1,647	−35.4%
2002	1,403	−14.8%
2011	1,223	−12.8%
2021	1,018	−16.8%
Source: Census data

According to the census from 2002, the commune had a population of 1,403; of this population, 99% were ethnic Romanians, 0.92% ethnic Hungarians, and 0.07% ethnic Roma. At the 2021 census, Aluniș had a population of 1,018, of which 90% were Romanians.
