= Orman =

Orman may refer to:

== People ==
- Aldona Orman (born 1968), Polish actress
- Alen Orman (born 1978), Austrian football player
- Charles Orman (1859–1927), British cricketer and soldier
- Fikret Orman (born 1967), Turkish businessman
- Greg Orman (born 1968), American businessman and senatorial candidate from Kansas
- Jack Orman, American television writer, producer and director
- James Bradley Orman (1849–1919), American politician and railroad builder
- John Orman (1949–2009), American political scientist
- Kate Orman (born 1968), Australian author
- Lorraine Orman (born 1948), New Zealand writer
- Miles Orman, American actor
- Olga Orman (1943–2021), Dutch-Aruban writer, poet and storyteller
- Rick Orman (born 1948), Canadian politician
- Roscoe Orman (born 1944), American actor
- Suze Orman (born 1951), American financial advisor, author, motivational speaker, and television host
- William T. Orman (died 1888), American politician

== Places ==
Egypt

- Orman Garden, botanical garden in Giza

North Macedonia

- Orman, Gjorče Petrov
- Orman, Ohrid

Romania

- Orman (river), a tributary of the Someșul Mic in Cluj County
- Orman, a village in Iclod Commune, Cluj County

Syria

- Orman, Syria, a village in the al-Suwayda Governorate

United States

- Orman House a state park and historic site in Apalachicola, Florida

== See also ==
- Van Orman, a surname
