= Florida Constitution of 1885 =

Florida's Constitution of 1885: Legal framework for Florida government from 1885 to 1968

Florida's Constitution of 1885, its fifth, was drawn up by the Constitutional Convention of 1885. The convention was held from June 9, 1885, until August 3, 1885, in Tallahassee, Florida "for the purpose of reforming the "Carpetbag" Constitution of 1868", according to course literature from the University of Virginia. It was Florida's fifth constitutional convention and restored the election of many public officials, reduced the salaries of the governor and other state officers, made the governor ineligible for reelection, abolished the office of lieutenant governor, and provided for a legislature of fixed numbers.

The agreed-upon constitution added a residency requirement, forbade a second consecutive term for the office of governor, made the cabinet elected instead of appointed, and made many state and local offices elective. It also gave the legislature the option of requiring the payment of a poll tax as a requirement for voting (Article VI, Section 8). This was a compromise between smaller "black belt" counties who wanted more offices elected and those from larger and more prosperous counties. The poll tax disenfranchised African-Americans, and anyone else too poor to pay the tax. Racial segregation in schools was mandatory (Article XII, Section 12). The constitution also prohibited marriage between "a white person and a person of negro descent" (Article XVI, Section 24).

The constitution ratified at the convention passed with a vote of 31,804 to 21,243. It was "the model" of Florida's government until 1968 and "represented the regression to racial discrimination which was occurring throughout the South in the post-Reconstruction era period."

== Executive branch ==
The Governor of Florida was popularly elected to a single 4 year term and could not be re-elected whether consecutively or non-consecutively. The governor had the power to call the legislature into session, appoint officials unless otherwise specified and could veto legislation. To be the Governor one had to be: a qualified voter, been a US citizen for 10 years and lived in the state for 5 years and must have been a citizen during that time period. If the Governor were to die the successor would be the Senate President.

== Legislative branch ==
Under the Constitution the state legislature consisted of two houses: a Senate and a House of Representatives. Members were elected every two years. The Senate and House elected their own respective Presidents and Speakers. All bills that were passed had to be agreed to in both chambers.

The Constitution was weighted in favor of counties. Each new county was entitled to one to three representatives according to population. Every ten years the lower house was automatically reconstructed on a basis of these members for each of the five largest counties, two members for each of the next eighteen, and one for each remaining county. In 1930, the big counties of the time, containing Florida’s largest cities, Jacksonville, Tampa, and Miami, had a combined population of 451,977, and had nine representatives and three senators. The four smallest counties had a combined of population of only 30,000, but had four representatives and three senators. This overrepresentation of rural, conservative areas led to increasing tension in twentieth-century Florida politics, as central and then south Florida grew. It was a major factor leading to the current Constitution of 1968, which changed apportionment.

== Judicial branch ==
The Judiciary consisted of several elements. At the top was the Supreme Court which the Constitution described as having 3 members who were popularly elected. To be a Supreme Court Justice one had to be at least 25 years old and be a practicing attorney; these requirements also applied to Circuit Court and Criminal Court judges.

Other offices in the order of highest to lowest in authority were: Circuit Courts, Criminal Courts, County Courts, County Judges and Justices of the Peace. There was 7 Circuit Court judges serving under 7 districts who were to be appointed by the Governor and confirmed by the Florida Senate.

== Delegates ==
Delegates included seven African Americans.

- Henry C. Baker - Nassau
- Thomas N. Bell - Hamilton
- William A. Blount - Escambia
- Daniel Campbell - Walton
- Wallace B. Carr - Leon, an African American
- Lewis D. Carson - Liberty
- Syd L. Carter - Levy
- Henry W. Chandler - Marion, an African American
- Thomas E. Clark - Jackson
- Thomas L. Clarke - Jefferson
- Simon Barclay Conover, M.D. - Leon
- James Wood Davidson - Dade
- Henry H. Duncan - Sumter
- George P. Fowler - Putnam
- F. B. Genovar - St. Johns
- Thomas Van Renssalaer Gibbs - Duval, an African American
- James D. Goss - Marion
- Jonathan C. Greeley - Duval
- William F. Green - 4th district
- Robert Henderson - Taylor
- John R. Herndon - 28th district
- Henry Clay Hicks - Franklin
- William A. Hocker - Sumter
- Samuel E. Hope - Hillsborough
- Joseph H. Humphries - Polk
- John B. Johnson - Alachua
- John Newton Krimminger - Santa Rosa
- John T. Lesley - Hillsborough
- Austin S. Mann - 22nd district
- Augustus Maxwell - Escambia
- Daniel M. McAlpin, First Assistant Secretary
- Alex. L. McCaskill - Walton
- James F. McClellan - Jackson
- A. Douglas McKinnon - Washington
- Hugh E. Miller - Marion
- William Hall Milton - Jackson
- John W. Mitchell - Leon, an African American
- John Neel - Holmes
- B.F. Oliveros - St. Johns
- William T. Orman - 5th district
- Henry L. Parker - Brevard
- John Parsons - Hernando
- Samuel Pasco, President - 9th district
- John C. Pelot, M.D. - Manatee
- Samuel Petty - Nassau, an African American
- Theodore Randell - Madison
- William H. Reynolds, Secretary
- John C. Richard - Bradford
- Robert Furman Rogers - Suwannee
- Norman T. Scott - Gadsden
- James Gamble Speer - Orange
- James B. Stone - Calhoun
- Thomas F. Swearingen - 7th district (Wakulla-Liberty)
- William F. Thompson - Leon, an African American
- Joseph M. Tolbert - Columbia
- John William Tompkins - Columbia
- Samuel J. Turnbull - Jefferson
- Burton Daniel Wadsworth - Madison
- David Shelby Walker, Jr. - 8th district
- William T. Weeks - Bradford
- John Westcott - St. Johns
- Charles Cooper Wilson - Polk
- James E. Yonge, 1st Vice President - Escambia

== See also ==
- Florida Constitution
- Florida Constitutional Convention of 1838

== Additional sources ==
- Charles W. Tebeau, A History of Florida (Coral Gables: University of Miami Press, 1971), 288-290.
- Michael Gannon, The New History of Florida (Gainesville: University Press of Florida, 1996), 263-264, 272, 275, 304.
- "The Florida Convention," New York Times, June 18, 1885, 1.
- "Florida's Constitution," New York Times, August 18, 1885, 11.
- Full Text of 1885 Constitution
- Journal of the proceedings of the Constitutional Convention of the state of Florida: which convened at the Capitol, at Tallahassee, on Tuesday, June 9, 1885
