= Suat (Gădălin) =

- Location within Romania

Location
- Country: Romania
- Counties: Cluj County
- Villages: Suatu, Căianu

Physical characteristics
- Mouth: Gădălin
  - location: Căianu Mic
  - coordinates: 46.7918°N 23.8942°E
- Length: 14 km (8.7 mi)
- Basin size: 93 km^{2} (36 sq mi)

Basin features
- Progression: Gădălin→ Someșul Mic→ Someș→ Tisza→ Danube→ Black Sea

The Suat is a right tributary of the river Gădălin in Romania. It flows into the Gădălin in Căianu Mic. Its length is 14 km (8.7 mi) and its basin size is 93 km^{2} (36 sq mi).
