= Valea Mare (Nadăș) =

Tributary of the Nadăş River in Romania

- Location within Romania

Location
- Country: Romania
- Counties: Cluj County
- Villages: Mihăiești, Sânpaul, Nădășelu

Physical characteristics
- Mouth: Nadăș
  - location: Nădășelu
  - coordinates: 46.8172°N 23.4284°E
- Length: 16 km (9.9 mi)
- Basin size: 104 km^{2} (40 sq mi)

Basin features
- Progression: Nadăș→ Someșul Mic→ Someș→ Tisza→ Danube→ Black Sea
- Tributaries
  - left: Săliște
  - right: Șardu

The Valea Mare is a left tributary of the river Nadăș in Romania. It flows into the Nadăș near Nădășelu. Its length is 16 km (9.9 mi) and its basin size is 104 km^{2} (40 sq mi).
