= Șomtelec =

- Location within Romania

Location
- Country: Romania
- Counties: Cluj County
- Villages: Cornești, Turea

Physical characteristics
- Mouth: Nadăș
  - location: Gârbău
  - coordinates: 46.8351°N 23.3553°E
- Length: 10 km (6.2 mi)
- Basin size: 25 km^{2} (9.7 sq mi)

Basin features
- Progression: Nadăș→ Someșul Mic→ Someș→ Tisza→ Danube→ Black Sea

The Șomtelec is a left tributary of the river Nadăș in Romania. It flows into the Nadăș in Gârbău. Its length is 10 km (6.2 mi) and its basin size is 25 km^{2} (9.7 sq mi).
