= Oncos =

- Industry: Agriculture

Oncos logo.

Oncos is a group of companies with Romanian private capital. Oncos is producer and distributor of fresh chicken, bread and pastry products, eggs. Trade activity is carried out through the network of retail stores in the cities of Cluj-Napoca, Gilău, Apahida, Huedin, Zalău, Jibou, Turda, Câmpia Turzii, Luduș, Gherla, Dej, Bistrița, Reghin, Târgu Mureș and the warehouse in Florești.

Oncos is a registered trademark. Also their trademarks are Painea bătută and Puiul de Florești.

The holding component also includes: Oncos Tonus, Gym fitness & bodybuilding and Lany's fashion house.
