= Popești (river) =

- Location within Romania

Location
- Country: Romania
- Counties: Cluj County
- Villages: Corușu, Popești

Physical characteristics
- Mouth: Nadăș
  - coordinates: 46°46′51″N 23°32′57″E
- Length: 12 km (7.5 mi)
- Basin size: 36 km^{2} (14 sq mi)

Basin features
- Progression: Nadăș→ Someșul Mic→ Someș→ Tisza→ Danube→ Black Sea

The Popești is a left tributary of the river Nadăș in Romania. It flows into Nadăș in the northwestern outskirts of Cluj-Napoca. Its length is 12 km (7.5 mi) and its basin size is 36 km^{2} (14 sq mi).
