= Dăbâca =

- Commune
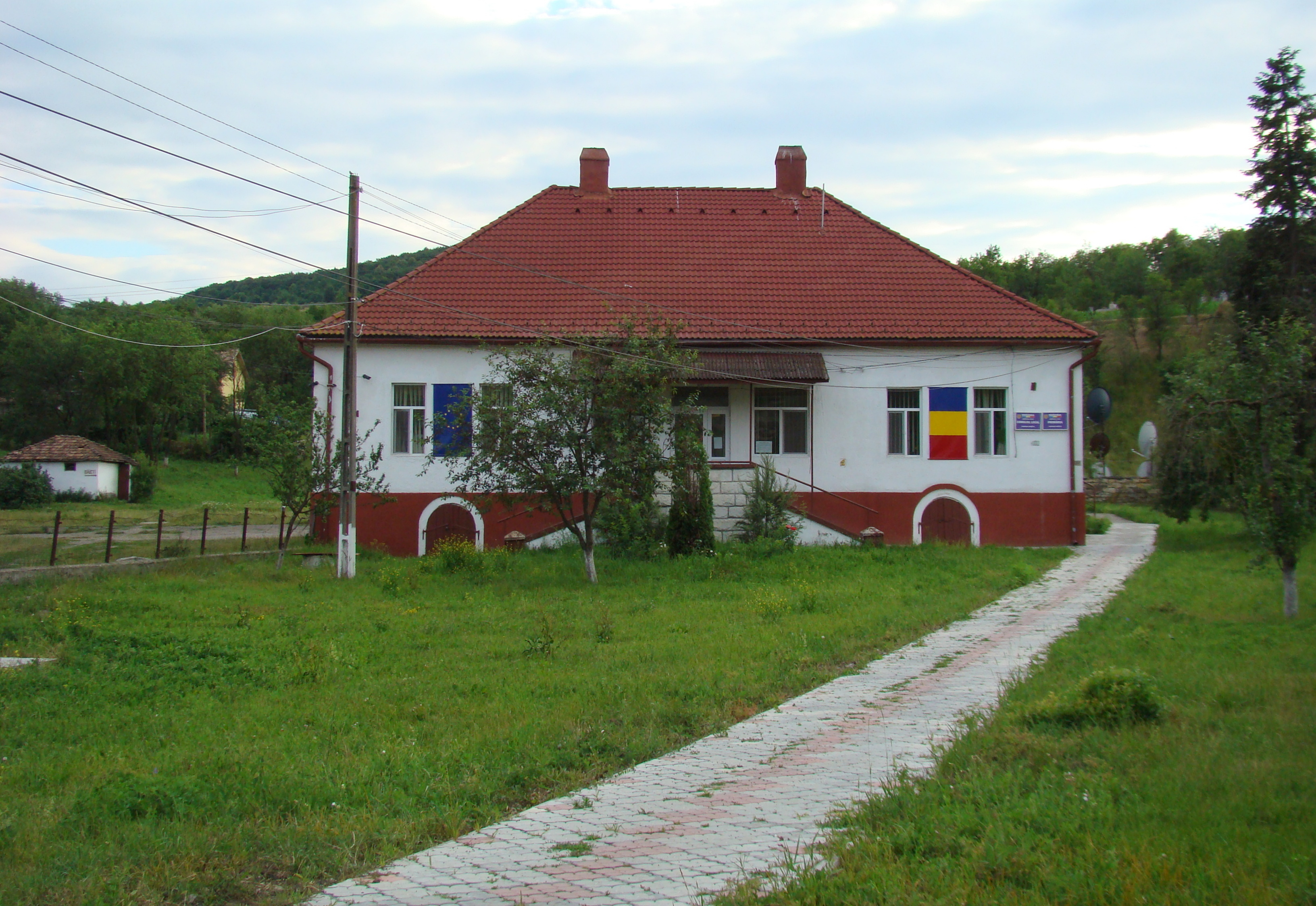
- Dăbâca town hall

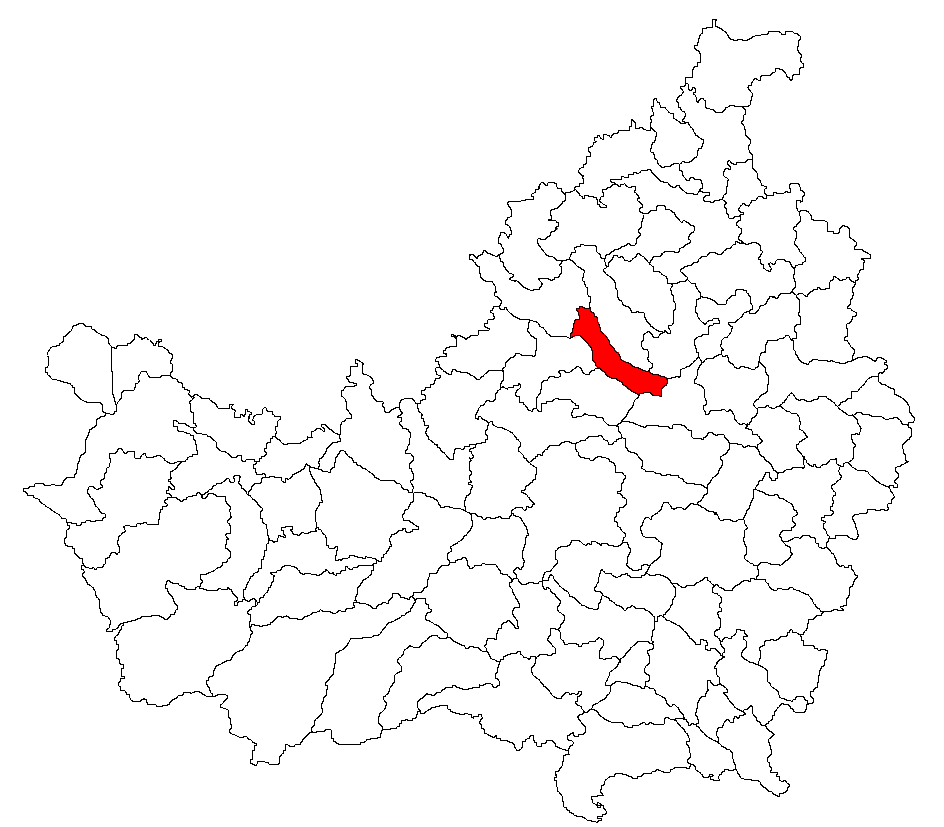
- Location in Cluj County

- Location in Romania
- Coordinates: 46°58′21″N 23°40′28″E
- Country: Romania
- County: Cluj
- Established: 1068
- Subdivisions: Dăbâca, Luna de Jos, Pâglișa

Government
  - Mayor (2020–2024): Emil Cioban (PNL)
- Area: 50 km^{2} (19 sq mi)
- Elevation: 334 m (1,096 ft)
- Highest elevation: 698 m (2,290 ft)
- Population (2021-12-01): 1,437
  - Density: 29/km^{2} (74/sq mi)
- Time zone: UTC+02:00 (EET)
  - Summer (DST): UTC+03:00 (EEST)
- Postal code: 407265
- Area code: +40 x64
- Vehicle reg.: CJ
- Website: primaria-dabaca.ro

Dăbâca (Hungarian: Doboka; German: Dobeschdorf) is a commune in Cluj County, Transylvania, Romania. It is composed of three villages: Dăbâca, Luna de Jos (Kendilóna), and Pâglișa (Poklostelke).

== Geography ==
The commune lies on the banks of the river Lonea. It is located in the central-north part of the county, at a distance of 24 km (15 mi) from Gherla and 37 km (23 mi) from the county seat, Cluj-Napoca. Dăbâca borders the following communes: Panticeu to the north, Cornești and Iclod to the east, Borșa and Bonțida to the south, and Vultureni to the west.

The ruins of Dăbâca Fortress lie on Fortress Hill, at an altitude of 698 m (2,290 ft); the fortress once was the seat of Doboka County.

== Demographics ==
According to the census from 2002 there was a total population of 1,804 people living in this commune. Of this population, 87.91% are ethnic Romanians, 7.53% are ethnic Hungarians, and 4.43% ethnic Romani.
