= Lonea =

Lonea Luna
- Location within Romania

Location
- Country: Romania
- Counties: Cluj County
- Villages: Panticeu, Pâglișa, Dăbâca, Luna de Jos

Physical characteristics
- Mouth: Someșul Mic
  - location: Fundătura
  - coordinates: 46.9542°N 23.8026°E
- Length: 37 km (23 mi)
- Basin size: 182 km^{2} (70 sq mi)

Basin features
- Progression: Someșul Mic→ Someș→ Tisza→ Danube→ Black Sea
- Tributaries
  - right: Groapa Gomboșoaiei

The Lonea (also: Luna) is a left tributary of the river Someșul Mic in Romania. It discharges into the Someșul Mic in Fundătura. Its length is 37 km (23 mi) and its basin size is 182 km^{2} (70 sq mi).
