= Mărăloiu =

- Location within Romania

Location
- Country: Romania
- Counties: Cluj County
- Villages: Boju, Cara, Moriști

Physical characteristics
- Mouth: Someșul Mic
  - location: Apahida
  - coordinates: 46.8124°N 23.7463°E
- Length: 16 km (9.9 mi)
- Basin size: 54 km^{2} (21 sq mi)

Basin features
- Progression: Someșul Mic→ Someș→ Tisza→ Danube→ Black Sea

The Mărăloiu is a right tributary of the river Someșul Mic in Romania. It discharges into the Someșul Mic in Apahida. Its length is 16 km (9.9 mi) and its basin size is 54 km^{2} (21 sq mi).
