= Valea Mărului (Someș) =

Romanian river

- Location within Romania

Location
- Country: Romania
- Counties: Cluj County
- Villages: Aluniș

Physical characteristics
- Mouth: Someșul Mic
  - location: Iclod
  - coordinates: 46.9900°N 23.8236°E
- Length: 17 km (11 mi)
- Basin size: 75 km^{2} (29 sq mi)

Basin features
- Progression: Someșul Mic→ Someș→ Tisza→ Danube→ Black Sea
- Tributaries
  - left: Ghirolt

The Valea Mărului is a left tributary of the river Someșul Mic in Romania. It discharges into the Someșul Mic in Iclod. Its length is 17 km (11 mi) and its basin size is 75 km^{2} (29 sq mi).
