= Samuel W. Frazier =

American politician

Samuel W. Frazier (born c. 1851, Georgia) was a farmer, justice of the peace and state legislator in Florida. He was elected to several terms in the Florida House of Representatives from Leon County.

He was the justice of the peace for Lean County from 1872 to 1873. Then served in the Florida House in 1879, 1885 and 1887.

In 1879 he served Leon County with William H. Ford, John E. Proctor and Samuel Walker.

In 1885 he served Leon County with Clinton Sneed (or Snead), David S. Walker, Jr. (son of David S. Walker) and Edmund C. Weeks.

In 1887 he served Leon County with Wallace B. Carr, John W. Mitchell and Clinton Sneed.

== See also ==
- African American officeholders from the end of the Civil War until before 1900
