= Zăpodie =

River in Romania

- Location within Romania

Location
- Country: Romania
- Counties: Cluj County
- Villages: Pata

Physical characteristics
- Mouth: Someșul Mic
  - location: Sânnicoară
  - coordinates: 46.7869°N 23.7120°E
- Length: 11 km (6.8 mi)
- Basin size: 44 km^{2} (17 sq mi)

Basin features
- Progression: Someșul Mic→ Someș→ Tisza→ Danube→ Black Sea

The Zăpodie is a right tributary of the river Someșul Mic in Romania. It discharges into the Someșul Mic in Sânnicoară near Cluj-Napoca. Its length is 11 km (6.8 mi) and its basin size is 44 km^{2} (17 sq mi). The river was polluted by the leachate from the nearby city landfill for many years, until December 2019 when the landfill was finally closed and a protection wall was completed.
