= Moceanu =

Moceanu is a Romanian surname. Notable people with the surname include:

- Dominique Moceanu (born 1981), American gymnast
- Gheorghe Moceanu (1838–1909), Romanian physical education teacher
