= Gădălin =

- Location within Romania

Location
- Country: Romania
- Counties: Cluj County
- Villages: Căianu, Gădălin, Bonțida

Physical characteristics
- Mouth: Someșul Mic
  - location: Bonțida
  - coordinates: 46.9217°N 23.8144°E
- Length: 29 km (18 mi)
- Basin size: 295 km^{2} (114 sq mi)

Basin features
- Progression: Someșul Mic→ Someș→ Tisza→ Danube→ Black Sea
- Tributaries
  - left: Tocbești
  - right: Suat, Sărat

The Gădălin is a right tributary of the river Someșul Mic in Romania. It discharges into the Someșul Mic in Bonțida. Its length is 29 km (18 mi) and its basin size is 295 km^{2} (114 sq mi).
