= Lujerdiu =

- Location within Romania

Location
- Country: Romania
- Counties: Cluj County
- Villages: Tiocu de Sus, Cornești, Lujerdiu

Physical characteristics
- Mouth: Someșul Mic
  - location: Fundătura
  - coordinates: 46.9643°N 23.8077°E
- Length: 26 km (16 mi)
- Basin size: 77 km^{2} (30 sq mi)

Basin features
- Progression: Someșul Mic→ Someș→ Tisza→ Danube→ Black Sea

The Lujerdiu is a left tributary of the river Someșul Mic in Romania. It discharges into the Someșul Mic in Fundătura. Its length is 26 km (16 mi) and its basin size is 77 km^{2} (30 sq mi).
