= Feiurdeni =

- Location within Romania

Location
- Country: Romania
- Counties: Cluj County
- Villages: Feiurdeni, Câmpeneşti

Physical characteristics
- Mouth: Someșul Mic
  - location: Apahida
  - coordinates: 46.8324°N 23.7595°E
- Length: 18 km (11 mi)
- Basin size: 58 km^{2} (22 sq mi)

Basin features
- Progression: Someșul Mic→ Someș→ Tisza→ Danube→ Black Sea

The Feiurdeni is a left tributary of the river Someșul Mic in Romania. It discharges into the Someșul Mic near Apahida. Its length is 18 km (11 mi) and its basin size is 58 km^{2} (22 sq mi).
