= Tocbești =

- Location within Romania

Location
- Country: Romania
- Counties: Cluj County

Physical characteristics
- Mouth: Gădălin
  - location: Downstream of Gădălin
  - coordinates: 46.8613°N 23.8247°E
- Length: 12 km (7.5 mi)
- Basin size: 23 km^{2} (8.9 sq mi)

Basin features
- Progression: Gădălin→ Someșul Mic→ Someș→ Tisza→ Danube→ Black Sea

The Tocbești is a left tributary of the river Gădălin in Romania. It flows into the Gădălin near Jucu de Sus. Its length is 12 km (7.5 mi) and its basin size is 23 km^{2} (8.9 sq mi).
