= Stoiana =

Stoiana may refer to:

- Mary Stoiana (born 2003), American tennis player
- Stoiana, a village in Cornești, Cluj, Romania
