= Nadăș (Someș) =

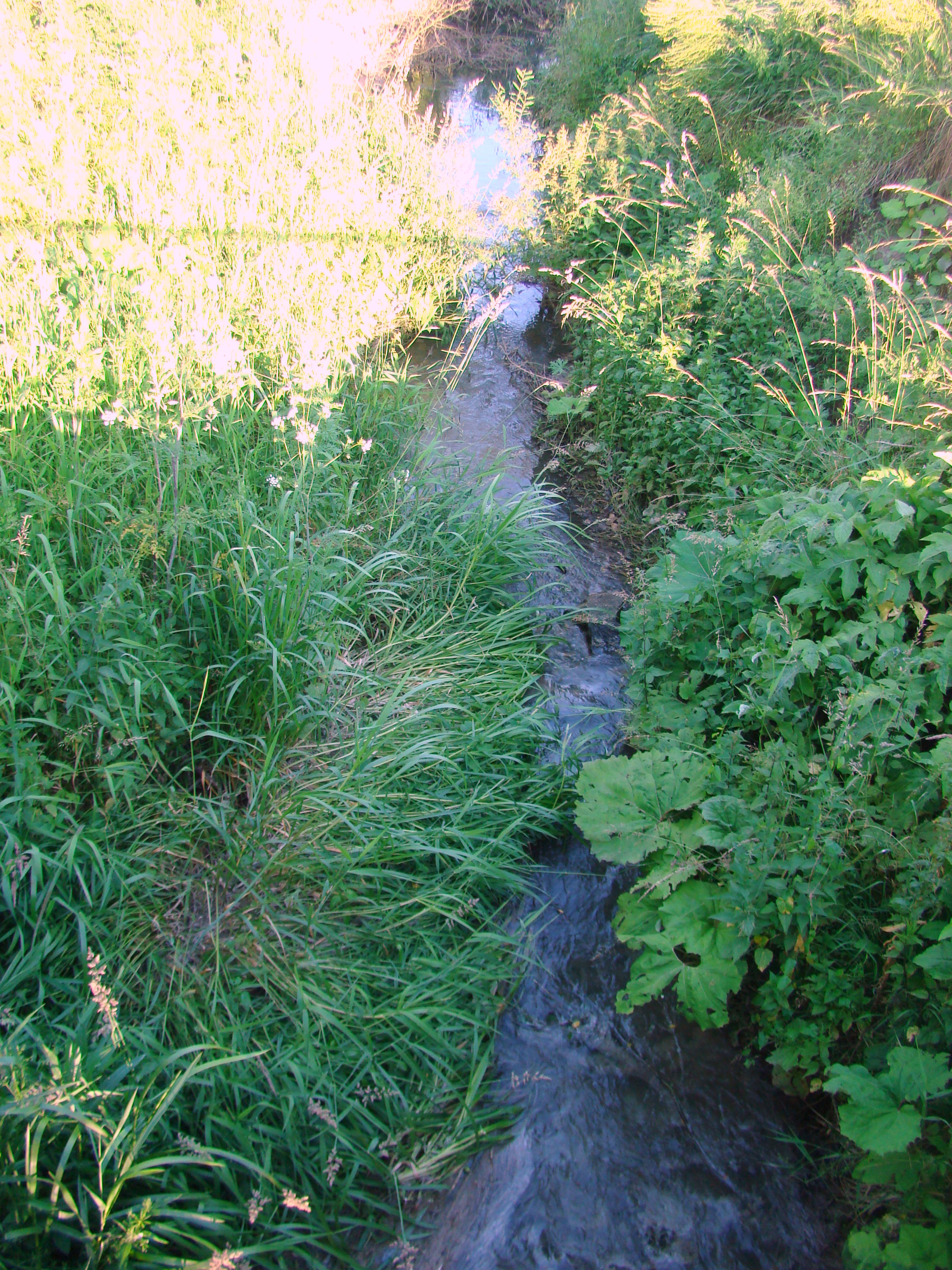

- Location within Romania

Location
- Country: Romania
- Counties: Cluj County
- Villages: Nadășu, Aghireșu, Gârbău, Baciu

Physical characteristics
- Mouth: Someșul Mic
  - location: Cluj-Napoca
  - coordinates: 46.7896°N 23.6002°E
- Length: 44 km (27 mi)
- Basin size: 372 km^{2} (144 sq mi)

Basin features
- Progression: Someșul Mic→ Someș→ Tisza→ Danube→ Black Sea
- Tributaries
  - left: Șomtelec, Valea Mare, Mera, Popești
  - right: Leghia, Inuc

The Nadăș (Hungarian: Nádas) is a left tributary of the river Someșul Mic in Romania. It discharges into the Someșul Mic in Cluj-Napoca. The name in Hungarian means "reedy". The Romanian name derives from that. Its length is 44 km (27 mi) and its basin size is 372 km^{2} (144 sq mi).
