= Feneș (Someș) =

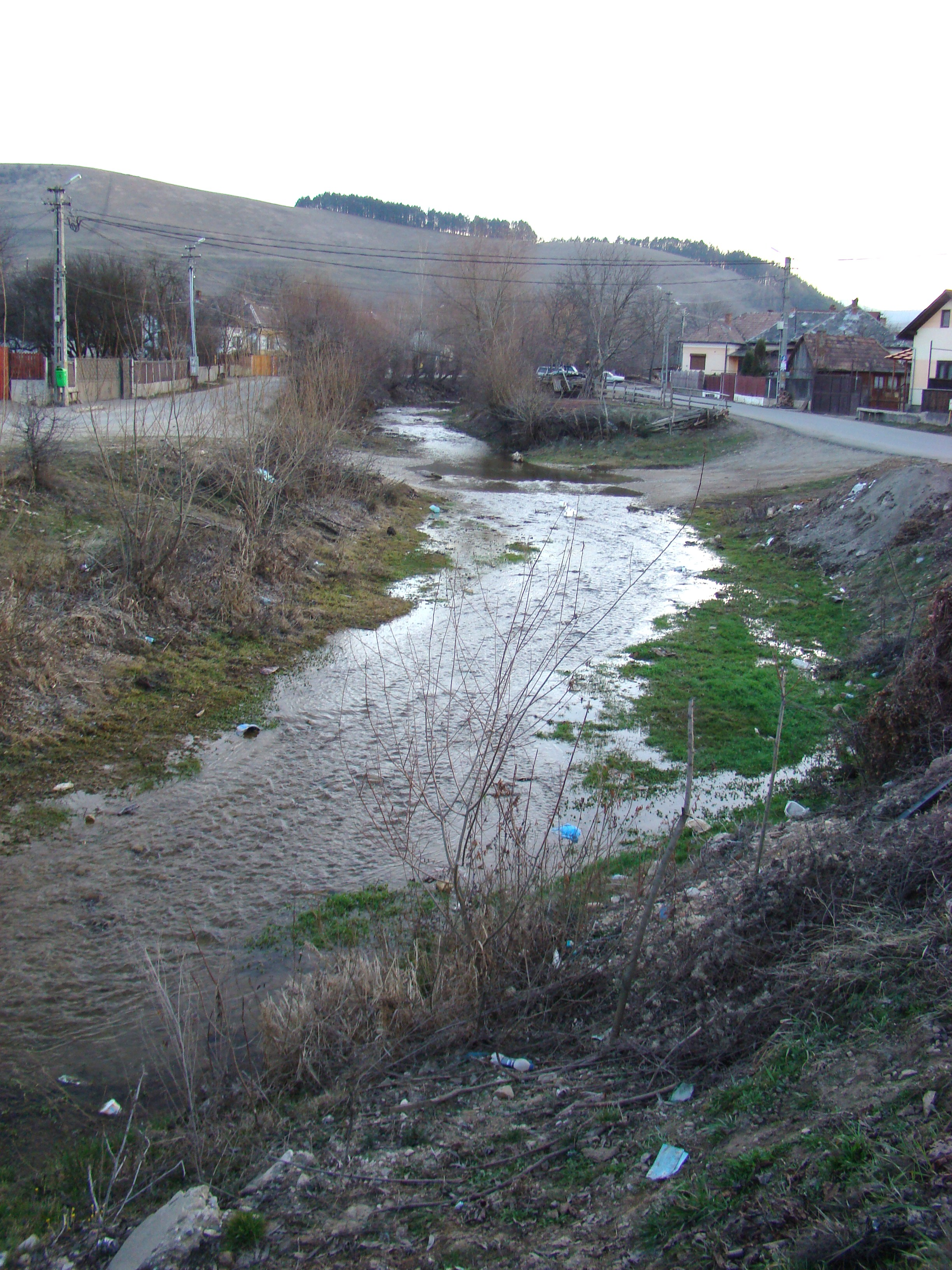

- Location within Romania

Location
- Country: Romania
- Counties: Cluj County
- Villages: Săvădisla, Vlaha

Physical characteristics
- Mouth: Someșul Mic
  - location: Luna de Sus
  - coordinates: 46.7523°N 23.4567°E
- Length: 23 km (14 mi)
- Basin size: 103 km^{2} (40 sq mi)

Basin features
- Progression: Someșul Mic→ Someș→ Tisza→ Danube→ Black Sea
- Tributaries
  - left: Stolna
  - right: Racoș

The Feneș (in its upper course: Finișel) is a right tributary of the river Someșul Mic in Romania. It discharges into the Someșul Mic in Luna de Sus. Its length is 23 km (14 mi) and its basin size is 103 km^{2} (40 sq mi).
