= Baciu =

Baciu Kisbács
- Commune
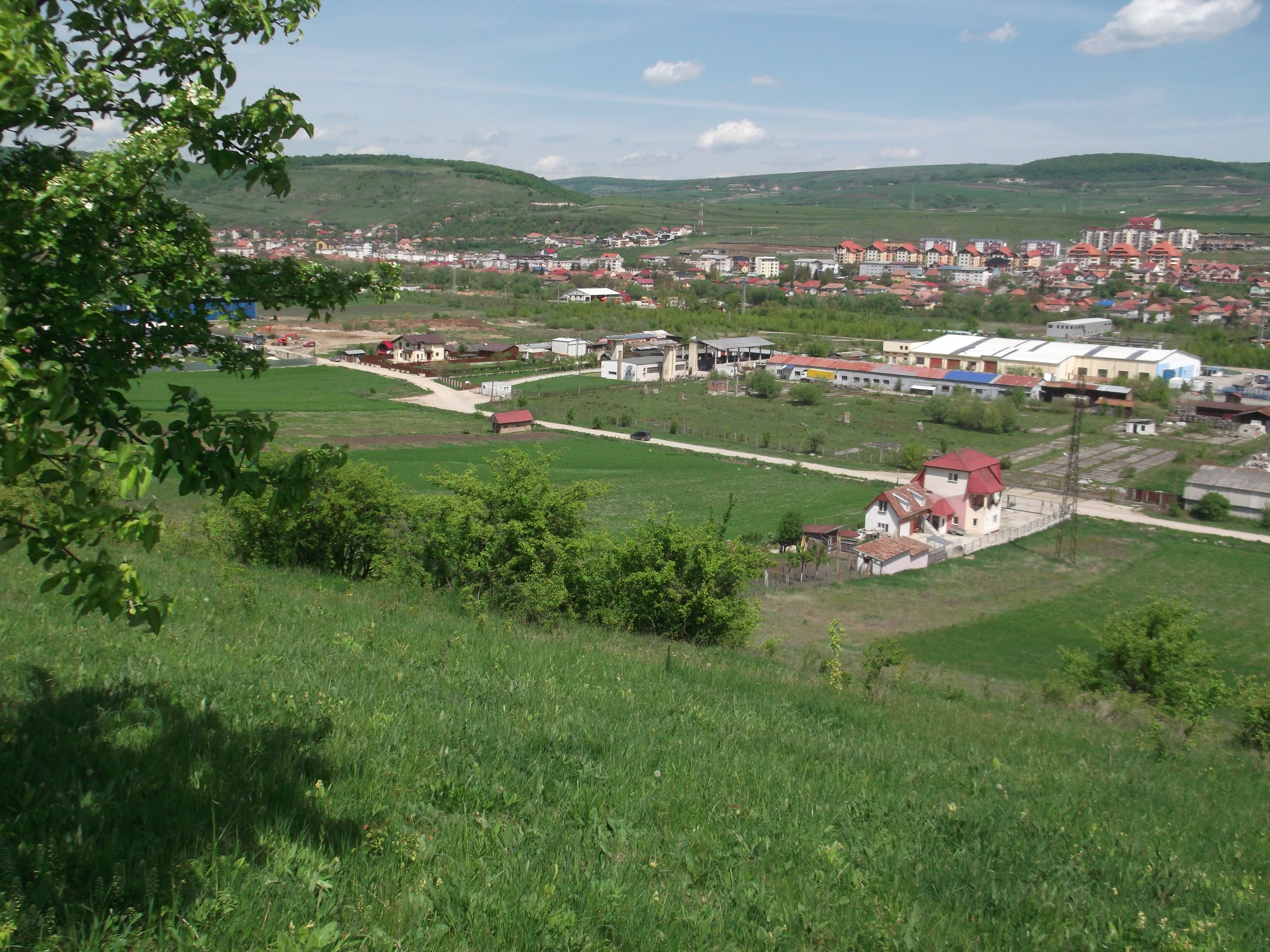
- Panoramic view of Baciu

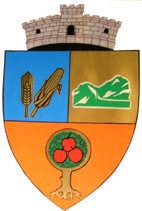
- Coat of arms

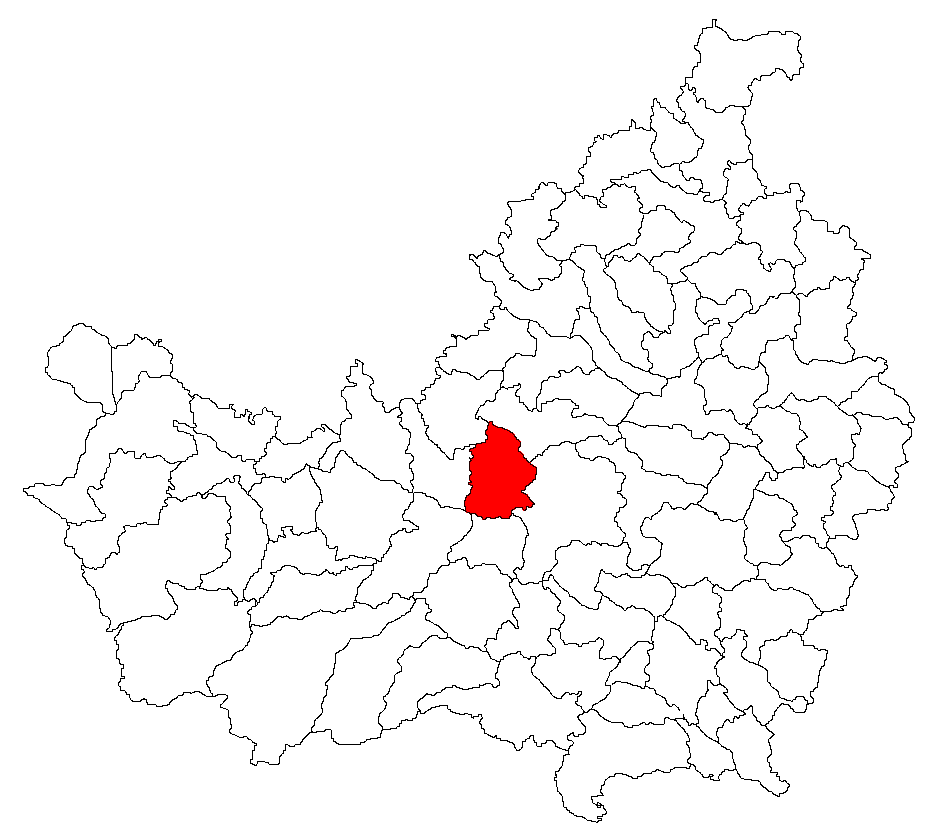
- Location in Cluj County

- Location in Romania
- Coordinates: 46°47′34″N 23°31′30″E
- Country: Romania
- County: Cluj
- Established: 1263
- Subdivisions: Baciu, Corușu, Mera, Popești, Rădaia, Săliștea Nouă, Suceagu

Government
  - Mayor (2020–2024): János Balázs (UDMR)
- Area: 87.51 km^{2} (33.79 sq mi)
- Elevation: 357 m (1,171 ft)
- Population (2021-12-01): 13,922
  - Density: 159.1/km^{2} (412.0/sq mi)
- Time zone: UTC+02:00 (EET)
  - Summer (DST): UTC+03:00 (EEST)
- Postal code: 407055
- Area code: +40 x64
- Vehicle reg.: CJ
- Website: www.primaria-baciu.ro

Baciu (Hungarian: Kisbács or Bács; German: Botschendorf) is a commune in Cluj County, located in the region of Transylvania, in the northwestern part of Romania. Baciu lies a short distance from the county seat of Cluj-Napoca. It is composed of seven villages: Baciu, Corușu (Nádaskóród), Mera (Méra), Popești (Nádaspapfalva), Rădaia (Andrásháza), Săliștea Nouă (Csonkatelep), and Suceagu (Szucság).

The commune is located in the central part of the county, in the region called Țara Călatei, just west of the county seat, Cluj-Napoca. The river Nadăș (a left tributary of the Someșul Mic) flows through Baciu.

== Demographics ==
According to the 2021 census, Baciu had a population of 13,922; of those, 58.6% were ethnic Romanians, 22.4% were ethnic Hungarians, and 3.1% were ethnic Romani.

== Natives ==
- György Györffy (1917–2000), Hungarian historian

== Notes ==
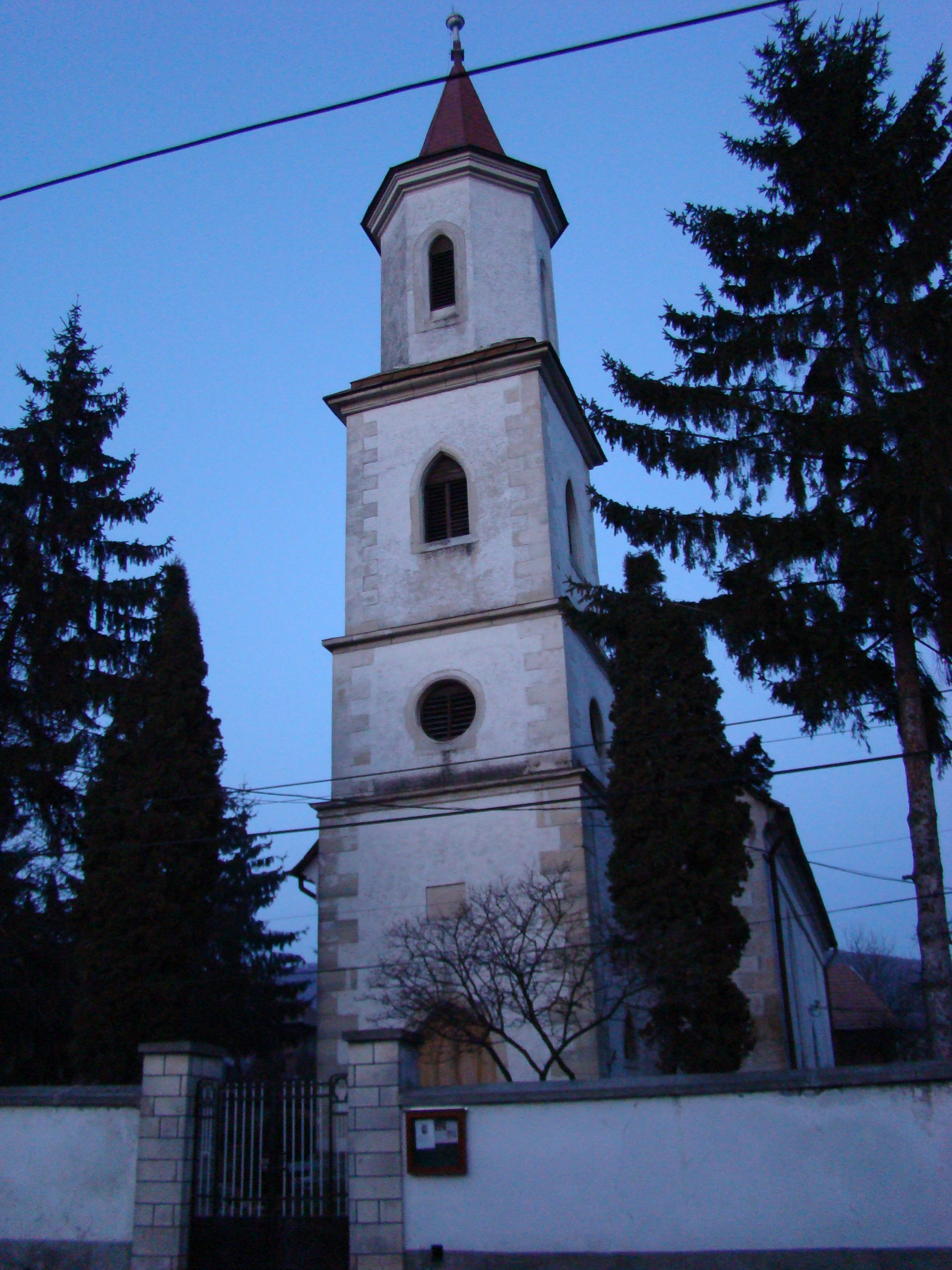
Reformed church in Mera

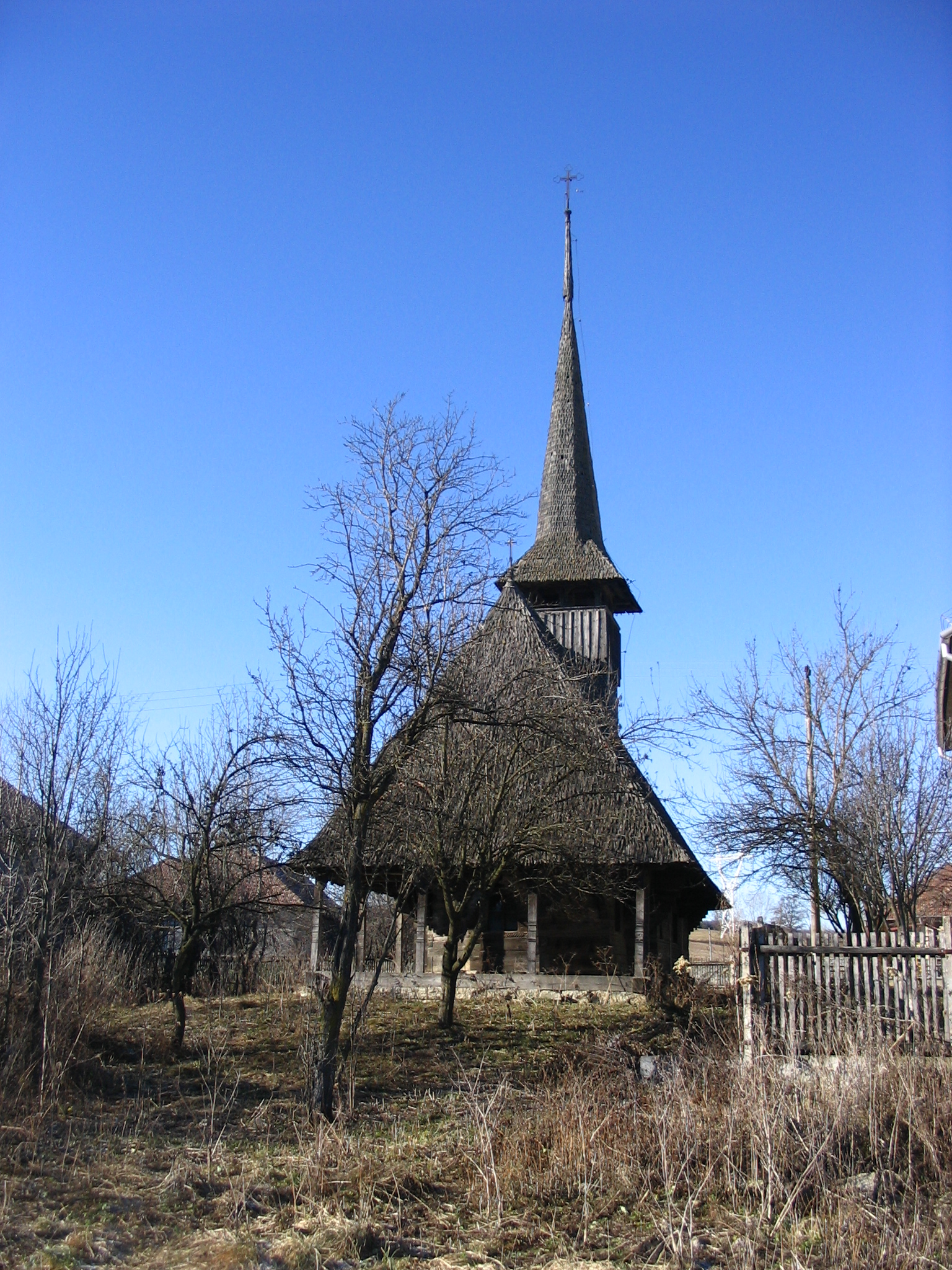
Romanian Orthodox wooden church in Săliștea Nouă

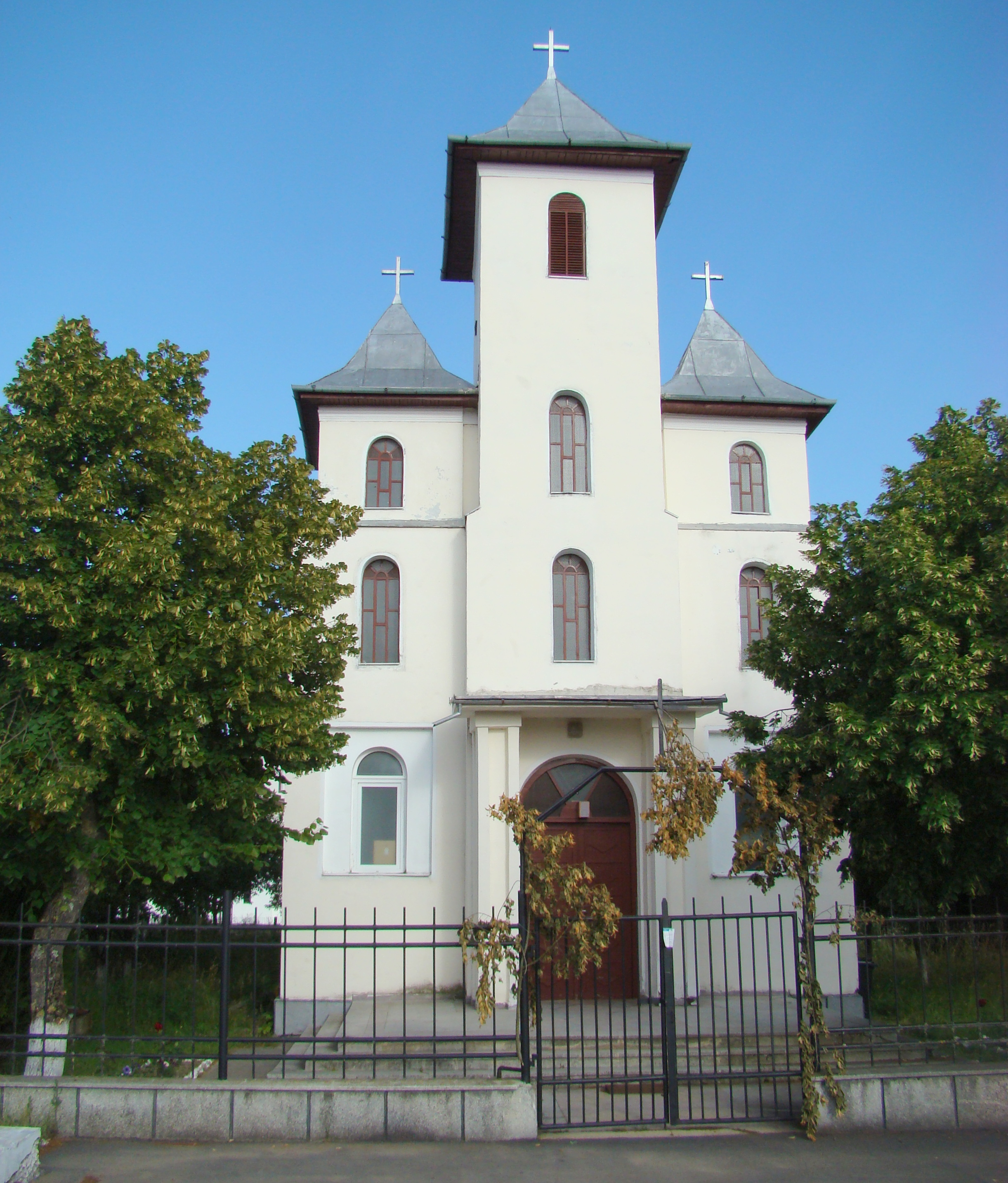
Greek-Catholic church in Săliștea Nouă

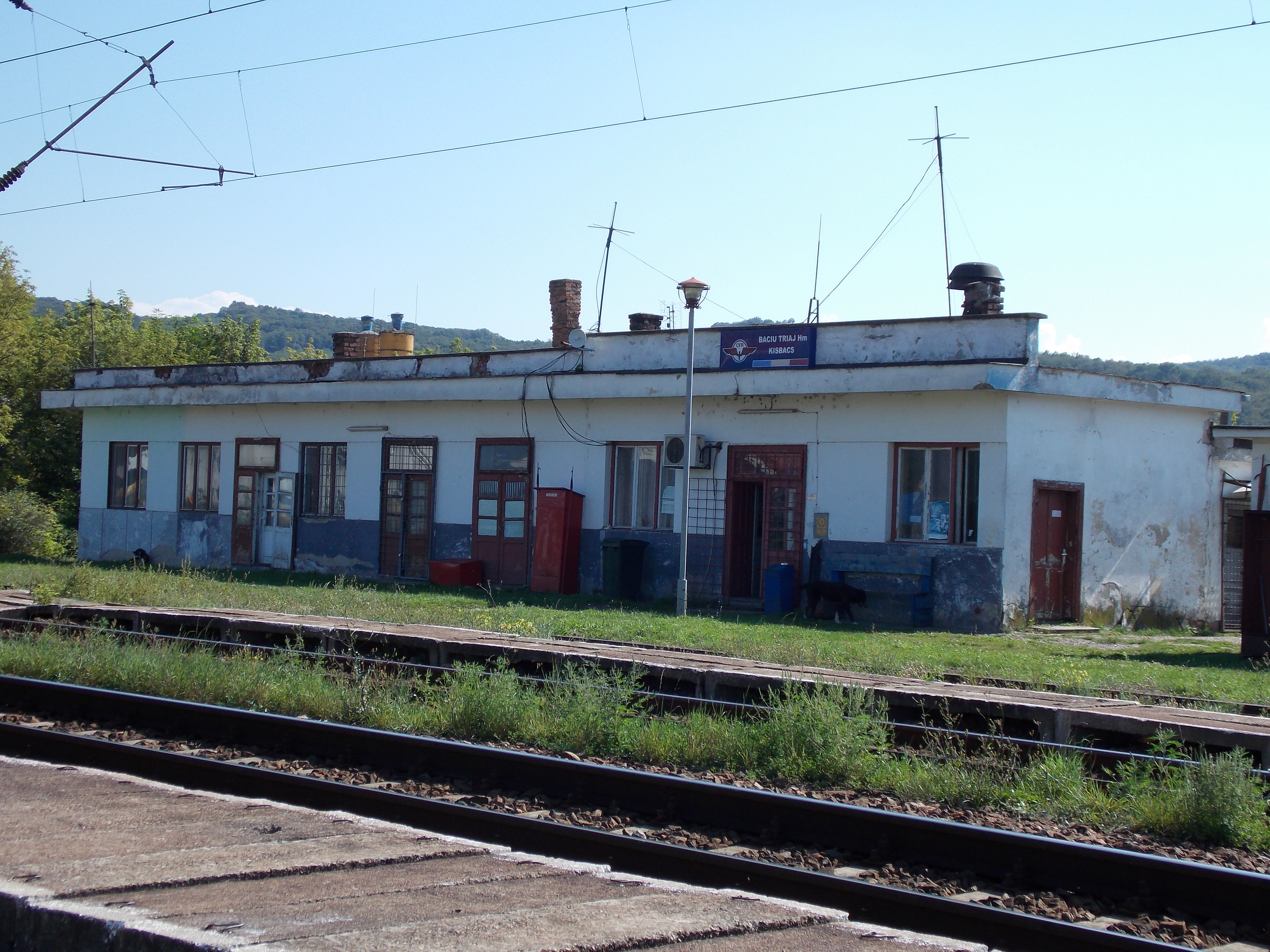
Baciu train station
