= Cornești, Cluj =

Cornești
- Commune
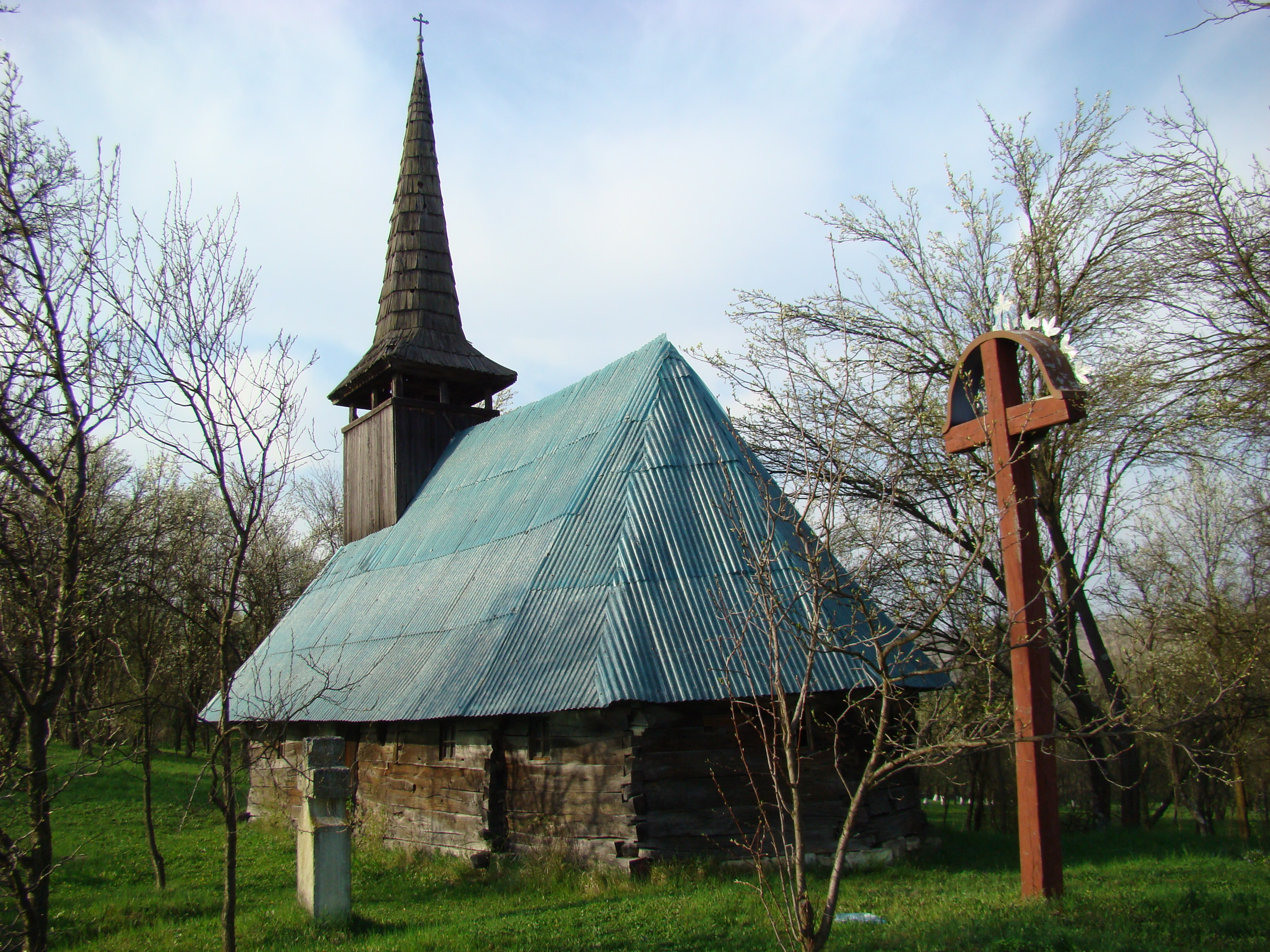
- Wooden church in Tioltiur village

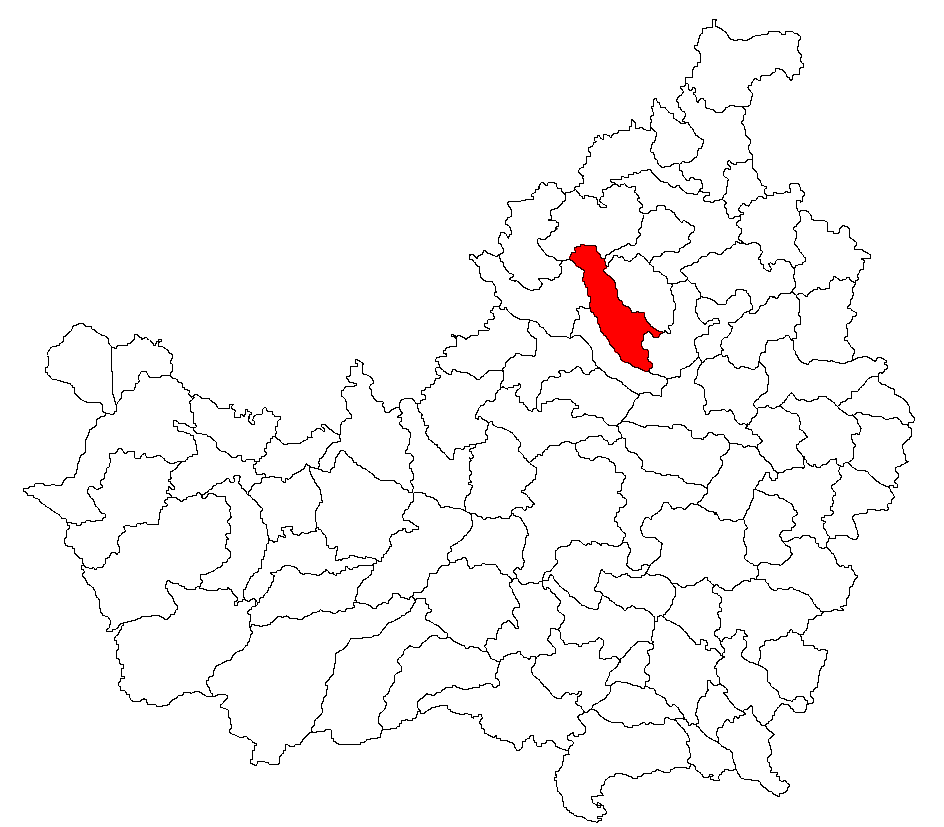
- Location in Cluj County

- Location in Romania
- Coordinates: 47°2′10″N 23°40′40″E
- Country: Romania
- County: Cluj
- Established: 1306
- Subdivisions: Bârlea, Cornești, Igriția, Lujerdiu, Morău, Stoiana, Tiocu de Jos, Tiocu de Sus, Tioltiur

Government
  - Mayor (2020–2024): Cornel Chifor (PNL)
- Area: 82.98 km^{2} (32.04 sq mi)
- Elevation: 342 m (1,122 ft)
- Population (2021-12-01): 1,325
  - Density: 15.97/km^{2} (41.36/sq mi)
- Time zone: UTC+02:00 (EET)
  - Summer (DST): UTC+03:00 (EEST)
- Postal code: 407250
- Area code: +(40) x64
- Vehicle reg.: CJ
- Website: primariacornesti.ro

Cornești (Hungarian: Magyarszarvaskend; German: Hirschdorf) is a commune in Cluj County, Transylvania, Romania. It is composed of nine villages: Bârlea (Ónok), Cornești, Igriția (Kisigrice), Lujerdiu (Lózsárd), Morău (Móró), Stoiana (Esztény), Tiocu de Jos (Alsótök), Tiocu de Sus (Felsőtök), and Tioltiur (Tötör).

The commune lies on the banks of the river Lujerdiu. It is located in the central-north part of the county, at a distance of 28 km (17 mi) from Gherla and 45 km (28 mi) from the county seat, Cluj-Napoca.

Cornești borders the following communes: Bobâlna to the north, Dăbâca and Panticeu to the west, Iclod to the south, and Aluniș to the east.

== Demographics ==
Historical population
Year	Pop.	±%
1880	3,667	—
1890	3,937	+7.4%
1900	4,332	+10.0%
1910	4,757	+9.8%
1920	4,485	−5.7%
1930	4,984	+11.1%
1941	5,520	+10.8%
1956	5,662	+2.6%
1966	4,587	−19.0%
1977	3,489	−23.9%
1992	1,967	−43.6%
2002	1,809	−8.0%
2011	1,493	−17.5%
2021	1,325	−11.3%
Source: Census data

According to the census from 2002 there was a total population of 1,809 people living in this commune; of this population, 83.80% were ethnic Romanians, 14.64% ethnic Hungarians, and 1.54% ethnic Roma. At the 2021 census, Cornești had a population of 1,325, of which 81.06% were Romanians, 9.51% Hungarians, and 3.17% Roma.

== Notes ==
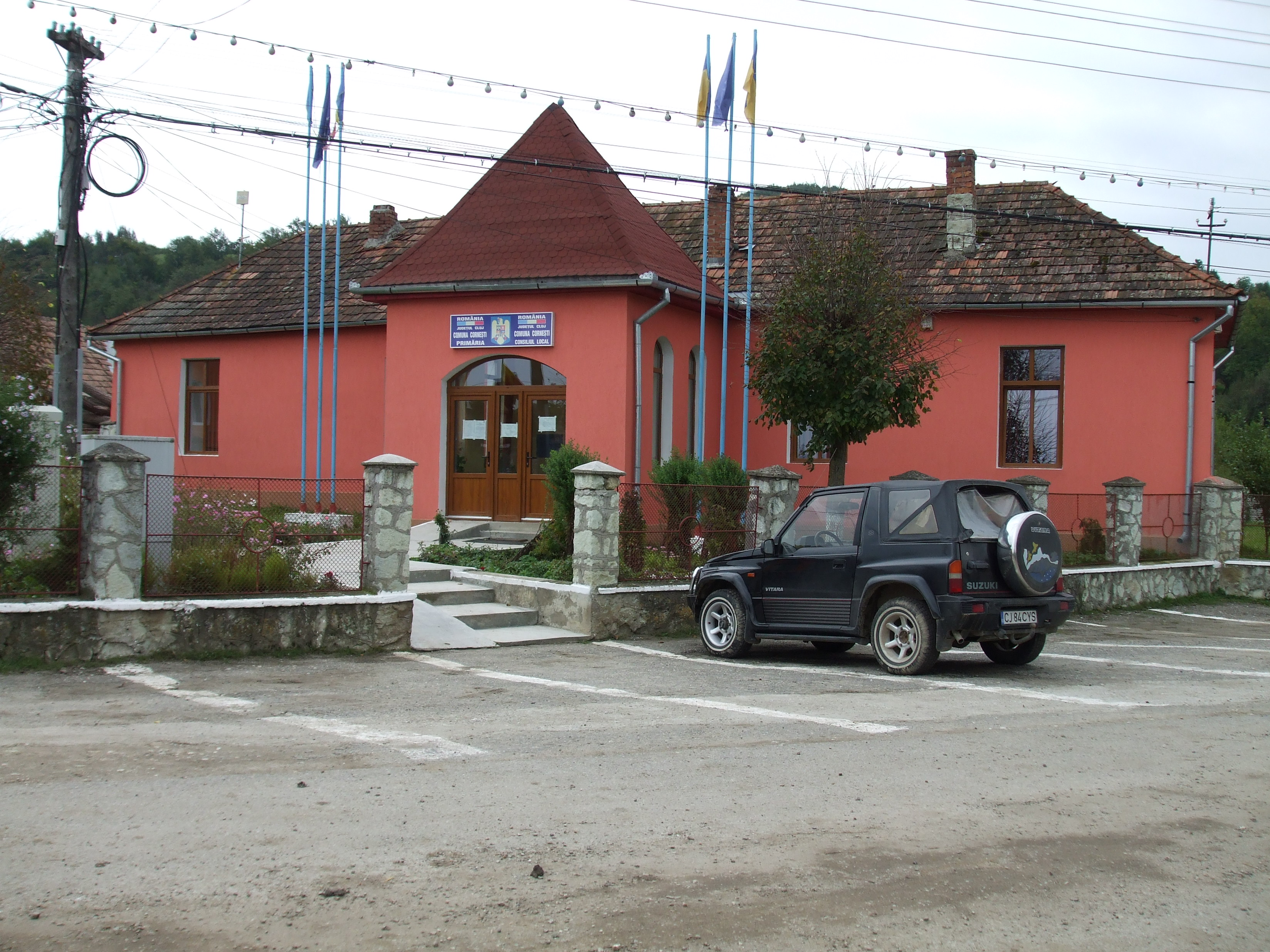
Cornești town hall

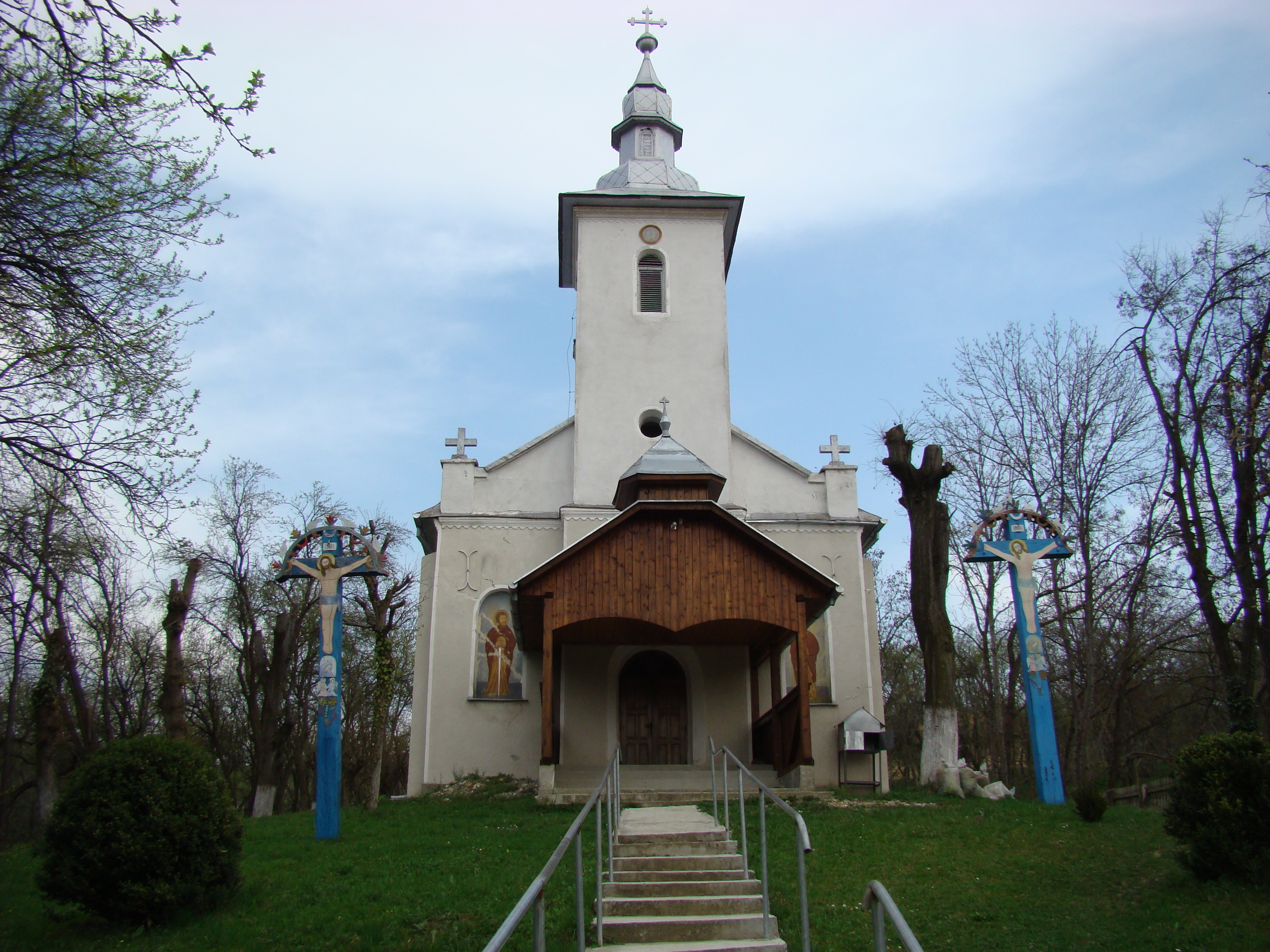
Church in Bârlea

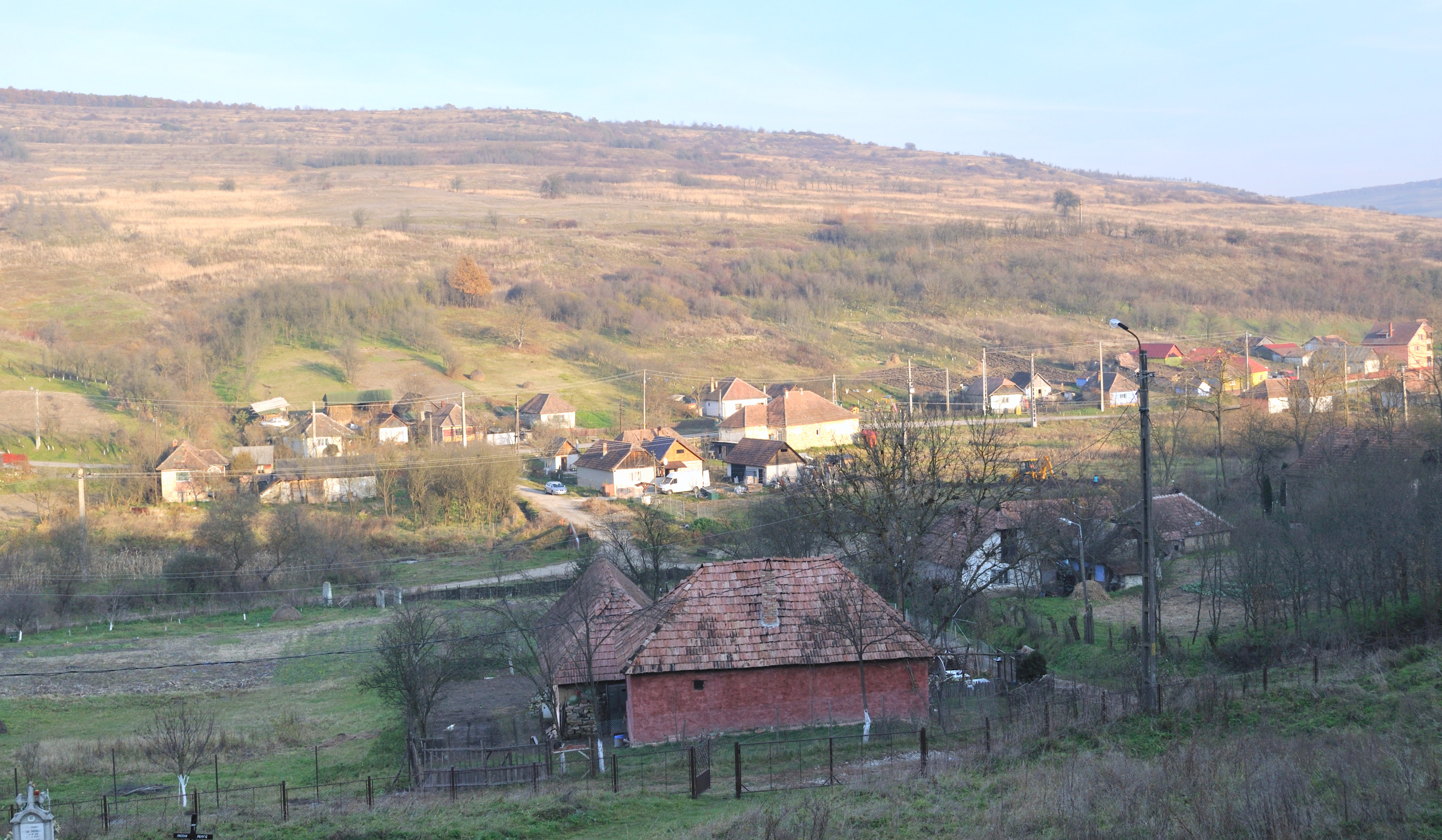
Morău

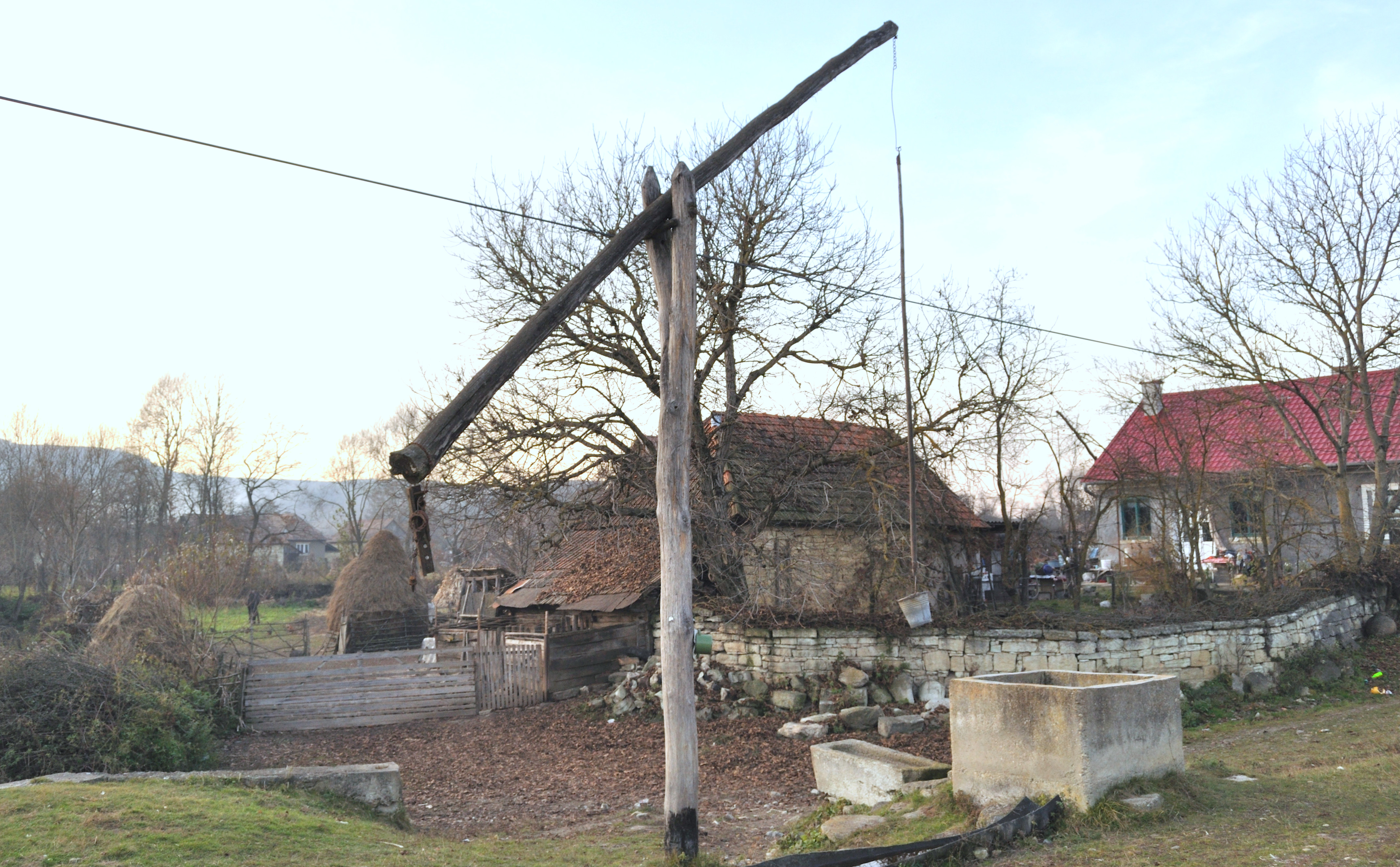
Tiocu de Jos
