= Pârâul Chintenilor =

Pârâul Chintenilor Chinteni
- Location within Romania

Location
- Country: Romania
- Counties: Cluj County
- Villages: Vechea, Chinteni

Physical characteristics
- Mouth: Someșul Mic
  - location: Cluj-Napoca
  - coordinates: 46.7916°N 23.6127°E
- Length: 15 km (9.3 mi)
- Basin size: 45 km^{2} (17 sq mi)

Basin features
- Progression: Someșul Mic→ Someș→ Tisza→ Danube→ Black Sea

The Pârâul Chintenilor (also: Chinteni) is a left tributary of the river Someșul Mic in Romania. It discharges into the Someșul Mic in Cluj-Napoca. Its length is 15 km (9.3 mi) and its basin size is 45 km^{2} (17 sq mi).
