= Orman (river) =

- Location within Romania

Location
- Country: Romania
- Counties: Cluj County
- Villages: Pintic, Orman

Physical characteristics
- Mouth: Someșul Mic
  - location: Livada
  - coordinates: 46.9963°N 23.8366°E
- Length: 10 km (6.2 mi)
- Basin size: 25 km^{2} (9.7 sq mi)

Basin features
- Progression: Someșul Mic→ Someș→ Tisza→ Danube→ Black Sea

The Orman is a left tributary of the river Someșul Mic in Romania. It discharges into the Someșul Mic in Livada. Its length is 10 km (6.2 mi) and its basin size is 25 km^{2} (9.7 sq mi).
