= Samuel Petty =

American local politician, carpenter and state legislator

Member of the Florida House of Representatives from the Nassau County district
- In office 1873–1875

Personal details
- Born: March 15, 1842 Duval County, Florida, U.S.
- Party: Republican
- Occupation: Carpenter

Samuel Petty (March 15, 1842 – ?) was a local politician and state legislator in Florida. He was also a delegate to Florida's 1885 Constitutional Convention.

He served for several year on Fernandina Beach's council and represented Nassau County, Florida in the Florida House of Representatives from 1873 to 1875. When he served in the Florida House, Liberty Billings represented Fernandina in the Florida Senate. He bid on a school construction project in Fernandina.

He testified that during the 1876 election "colored" railroad employees were compelled to vote the Democratic Party ticket with marked ballots that were tracked to ensure they complied. He testified that those who did not were fired.

== See also ==
- African American officeholders from the end of the Civil War until before 1900
