= Gârbău (Someșul Mic) =

- Location within Romania

Location
- Country: Romania
- Counties: Cluj County

Physical characteristics
- Mouth: Someșul Mic
  - location: Cluj-Napoca
  - coordinates: 46.7595°N 23.5358°E
- Length: 7 km (4.3 mi)
- Basin size: 28 km^{2} (11 sq mi)

Basin features
- Progression: Someșul Mic→ Someș→ Tisza→ Danube→ Black Sea

The Gârbău is a right tributary of the river Someșul Mic in Romania. It discharges into the Someșul Mic near Cluj-Napoca. Its length is 7 km (4.3 mi) and its basin size is 28 km^{2} (11 sq mi).
