= Pârâul Ocnei =

- Location within Romania

Location
- Country: Romania
- Counties: Cluj County
- Villages: Ocna Dejului

Physical characteristics
- Mouth: Someșul Mic
  - coordinates: 47.1281°N 23.9093°E
- Length: 10 km (6.2 mi)
- Basin size: 34 km^{2} (13 sq mi)

Basin features
- Progression: Someșul Mic→ Someș→ Tisza→ Danube→ Black Sea
- Tributaries
  - right: Chiejd

The Pârâul Ocnei is a left tributary of the river Someșul Mic in Romania. It discharges into the Someșul Mic near Dej. Its length is 10 km (6.2 mi) and its basin size is 34 km^{2} (13 sq mi).
