= Orman, Gjorče Petrov =

Orman (Kosovo) Орман
- Village
- Kosovo
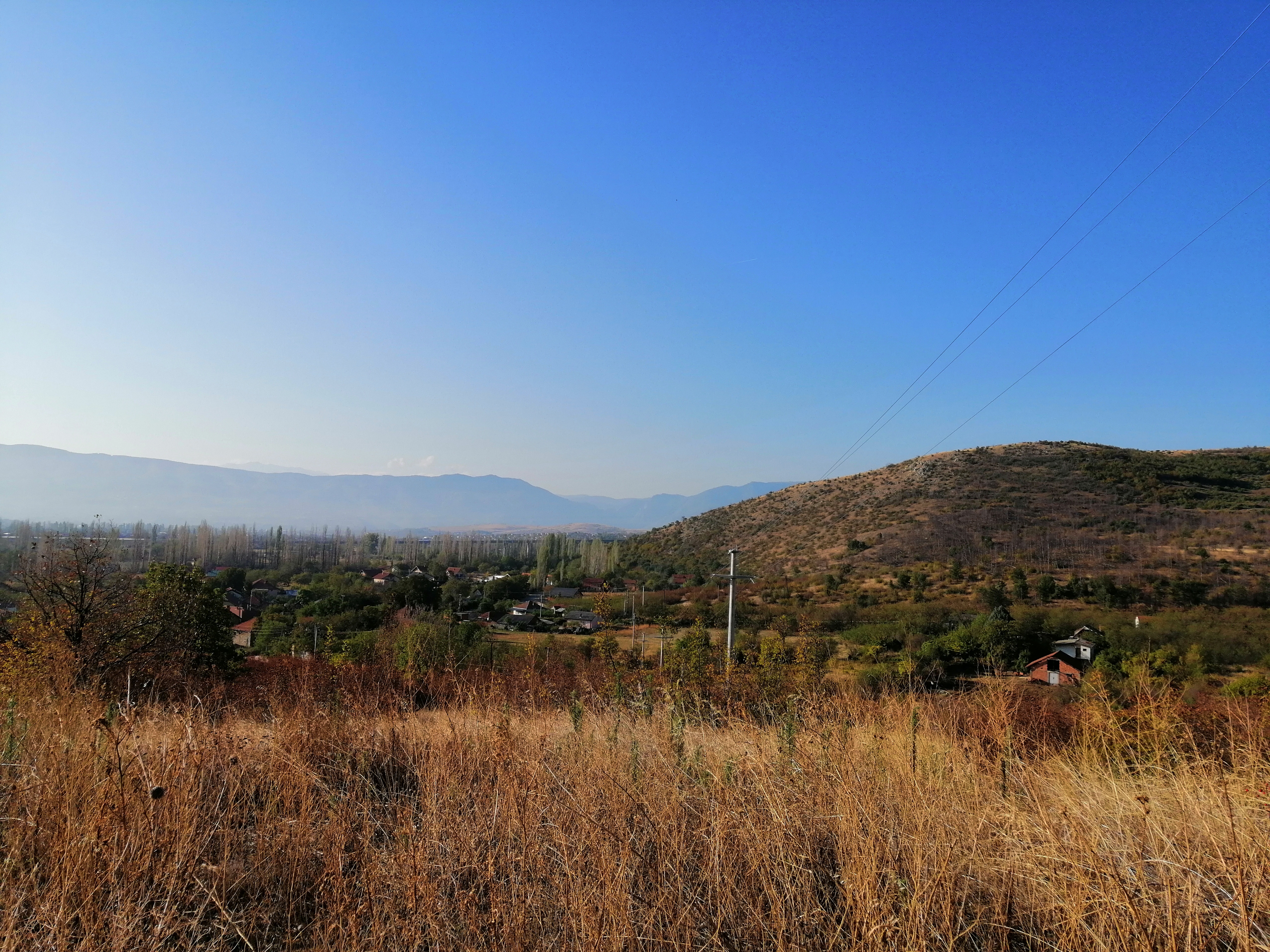
- Nickname: Kosovo
- Location within North Macedonia
- Coordinates: 42.0669°N 21.3567°E
- Country: North Macedonia
- Region: Skopje
- Municipality: Gjorče Petrov

Population (2021)
  - Total: 546
- Time zone: UTC+1 (CET)
  - Summer (DST): UTC+2 (CEST)
- Car plates: SK
- Website: .

Orman (Macedonian: Орман) is a town in the municipality of Gjorče Petrov, North Macedonia.

== Demographics ==
As of the 2021 census, Orman had 546 residents with the following ethnic composition:

- Macedonians 481
- Persons for whom data are taken from administrative sources 35
- Serbs 22
- Others 8

According to the 2002 census, the village had a total of 461 inhabitants. Ethnic groups in the village include:

- Macedonians 418
- Serbs 28
- Romani 2
- Others 13
