= J. G. Speer =

American judge and politician

James Gamble Speer (June 23, 1820 - October 31, 1893) was a judge and state legislator in Florida. He was a founder of Oakland, Florida. He served in the Florida House of Representatives and the Florida Senate. He was also a delegate to Florida's 1885 Constitutional Convention. He was a Democrat.

In 1879 he represented Orange County, Florida in the Florida Senate. His post office was in Oakland, Florida.

He was born in Abbeville, South Carolina and came to Florida as a member of the Indian Removal Commission of 1854.

He advocated for a canal between Lake Apopka and Lake Dora.

Speer Park and Speer Avenue in Oakland are named for him.
