= Van Orman =

Van Orman or VanOrman is a surname. Notable people with the surname include:

- Ray Van Orman (c. 1883 – 1954), American football and lacrosse coach and veterinarian
- Suzanne VanOrman (born 1939), American politician
- Thurop Van Orman (born 1976), American animator and voice actor
- Ward Van Orman (1894–1978), American engineer, inventor and balloonist
- Willard Van Orman Quine (1908–2000), American philosopher and logician
