= Gheorghe Moceanu =

Romanian physical education teacher

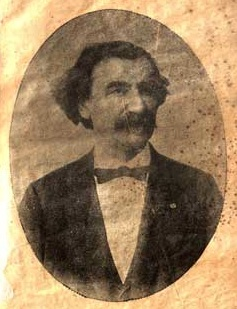
Gheorghe Moceanu

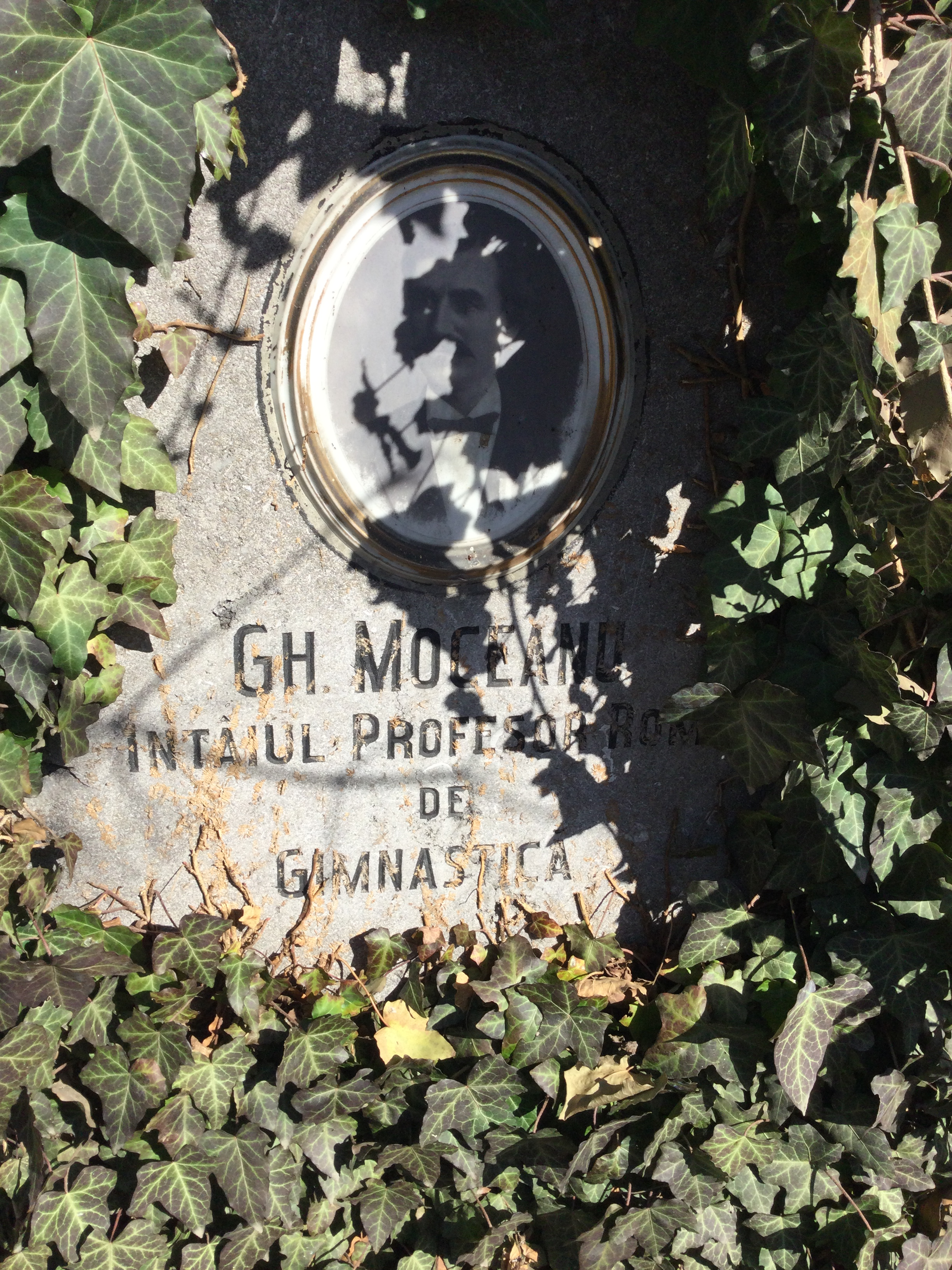
Grave at Sfânta Vineri Cemetery

Gheorghe Moceanu (1838–1909) was a Transylvanian, later Romanian physical education teacher who laid the foundations for the discipline in his adopted country.

Born in Orman, Cluj County, in Austrian-ruled Transylvania, he attended high school in Gherla and Blaj prior to studying pedagogics in Budapest and gymnastics at Vienna. Unable to make a living in his native province, he crossed the Carpathian Mountains into the Romanian Old Kingdom in 1862. He was educated according to the system of Friedrich Ludwig Jahn, which emphasized collective exercises meant to regenerate the nation's physical vigor. Until he finished training the first students capable of carrying on his work, he was Romania's only gymnastics master, with other classes being taught by junior army officers or firemen. He laid the foundations for physical education in Romania, teaching at Bucharest's Matei Basarab and Saint Sava high schools, as well as at Craiova's Carol I High School. He also introduced gymnastics education to the army, leading classes at the officers' school and, from 1868, at the Romanian Society for Arms, Gymnastics and Target Shooting. He designed curricula and organized competitions between schools.

Moceanu wrote a dozen books, the first appearing in 1869. These were intended to popularize and explain gymnastics exercises, received favorable reviews and drew interest from prominent cultural figures such as Bogdan Petriceicu Hasdeu. Together with Carol Davila, he founded the Micii dorobanți youth movement, which sought the physical development and military training of youth, as well as the awakening of national consciousness. Other collaborators included Ioan Emanoil Florescu and V. A. Urechia, while King Carol I expressed support. Moceanu strongly advocated for the introduction of physical education into girls' schools, his chief argument being that a sickly mother could only produce weak children. He is also responsible for the introduction of folk dances into the gymnastics curriculum; these have remained a distinctive aspect thereof. Popular games remained a part of the educational program, although after 1918, the German system was replaced by the Swedish one, which was conceived with the individual's needs in mind. Together with several pupils, he made several trips abroad in order to present Romanian games: to Paris (1878), Rome (1882), Madrid (1884) and Calcutta (1890).

Nicolae Iorga, generally not enthralled by athletics, wrote an appreciative obituary, while Alexandru I. Șonțu wrote a poem in his memory. Nevertheless, his name was soon largely forgotten. His bust, which had stood at the shooting society headquarters on the bank of the Dâmbovița River in Bucharest, had disappeared by 1930, when Gala Galaction wrote of his former teacher. A street near the Romanian Television headquarters bears his name today. In 2008, in commemoration of the 170th anniversary of Moceanu's birth, the school in his native village was named in his honor, and a memorial plaque unveiled.
