= Wallace B. Carr =

American politician (1853–1931)

Wallace B. Carr (June 22, 1853 – 1931) was an American politician. He served in the Florida House of Representatives in 1881 and 1887, representing Leon County. He also served in the Committee in Agriculture.

He was born in Leon County, Florida. He had mixed heritage and was documented as being "mulatto". He was a delegate at the 1885 Florida Constitutional Convention. He was described as "colored".
