= William T. Orman =

State legislator in the state of Florida

Member of the Florida House of Representatives from Franklin County
- In office 1871–1872
- In office 1875

Member of the Florida Senate from the 5th district
- In office 1877–1879
- In office 1885–1887

Personal details
- Died: October 1888

William T. Orman (died October 1888), also known as W. T. Orman, was a state legislator in the state of Florida.

Orman served in the Florida House of Representatives from 1871 to 1872 and again in 1875. He represented Franklin County (5th district) in the Florida Senate from 1877 to 1879 and again from 1885 to 1887. His post office was in Appalachicola.
