= Căianu =

Căianu Magyarkályán
- Commune
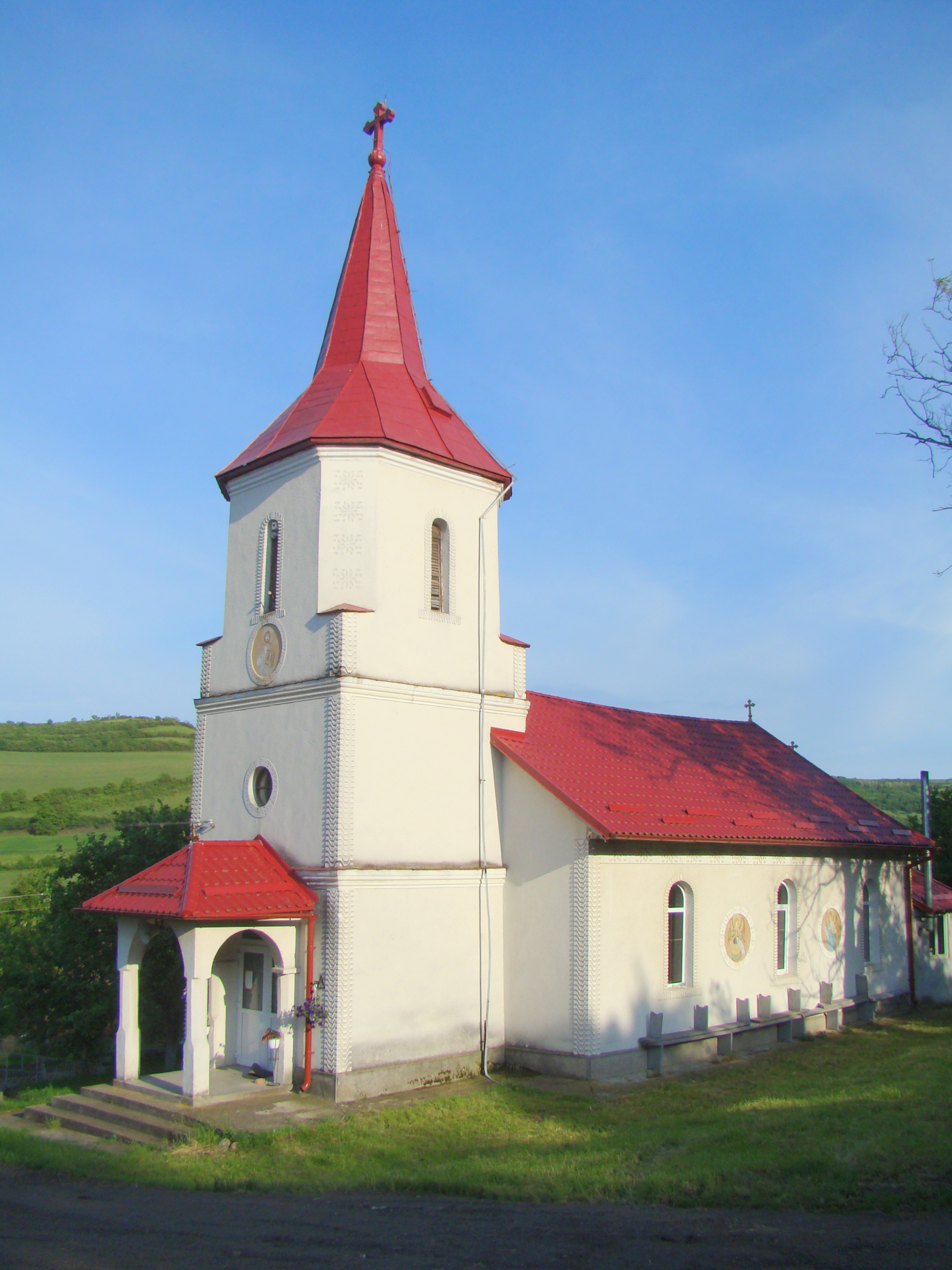
- Orthodox church in Căianu

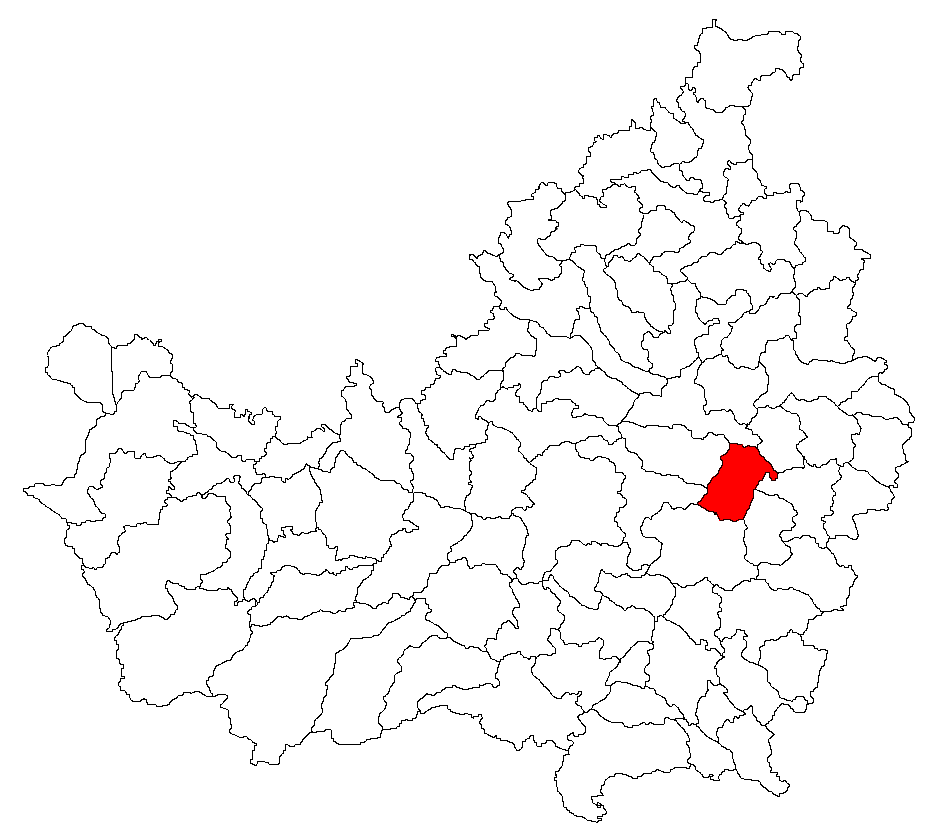
- Location in Cluj County

- Location in Romania
- Coordinates: 46°47′0″N 23°55′0″E
- Country: Romania
- County: Cluj
- Established: 1326
- Subdivisions: Bărăi, Căianu, Căianu Mic, Căianu-Vamă, Vaida-Cămăraș, Văleni

Government
  - Mayor (2020–2024): Daniel-Mugurel Crișan (PNL)
- Area: 55.11 km^{2} (21.28 sq mi)
- Elevation: 355 m (1,165 ft)
- Population (2021-12-01): 2,191
  - Density: 39.76/km^{2} (103.0/sq mi)
- Time zone: UTC+02:00 (EET)
  - Summer (DST): UTC+03:00 (EEST)
- Area code: +(40) x64
- Vehicle reg.: CJ
- Website: primariacaianu.ro

Căianu (Hungarian: Magyarkályán; German: Klandorf) is a commune in Cluj County, Transylvania, Romania. It is composed of six villages: Bărăi (Báré), Căianu, Căianu Mic (Kiskályán), Căianu-Vamă (Kályánivám), Vaida-Cămăraș (Vajdakamarás), and Văleni (Lárgatanya).

== Demographics ==
Historical population
Year	Pop.	±%
1850	1,984	—
1880	2,306	+16.2%
1890	2,690	+16.7%
1900	2,961	+10.1%
1910	3,250	+9.8%
1920	3,327	+2.4%
1930	3,610	+8.5%
1941	4,073	+12.8%
1956	4,541	+11.5%
1966	3,971	−12.6%
1977	3,723	−6.2%
1992	2,700	−27.5%
2002	2,587	−4.2%
2011	2,355	−9.0%
2021	2,191	−7.0%
Source: Census data

According to the 2011 census, the commune had 2,355 inhabitants; Romanians made up 58.13% of the population, Hungarians made up 36.26%, and Roma made up 2.55%. At the 2021 census, Căianu had a population of 2,191; of those, 59.52% were Romanians, 30.58% Hungarians, and 2.51% Roma.
