= Florești, Cluj =

Florești
- Commune
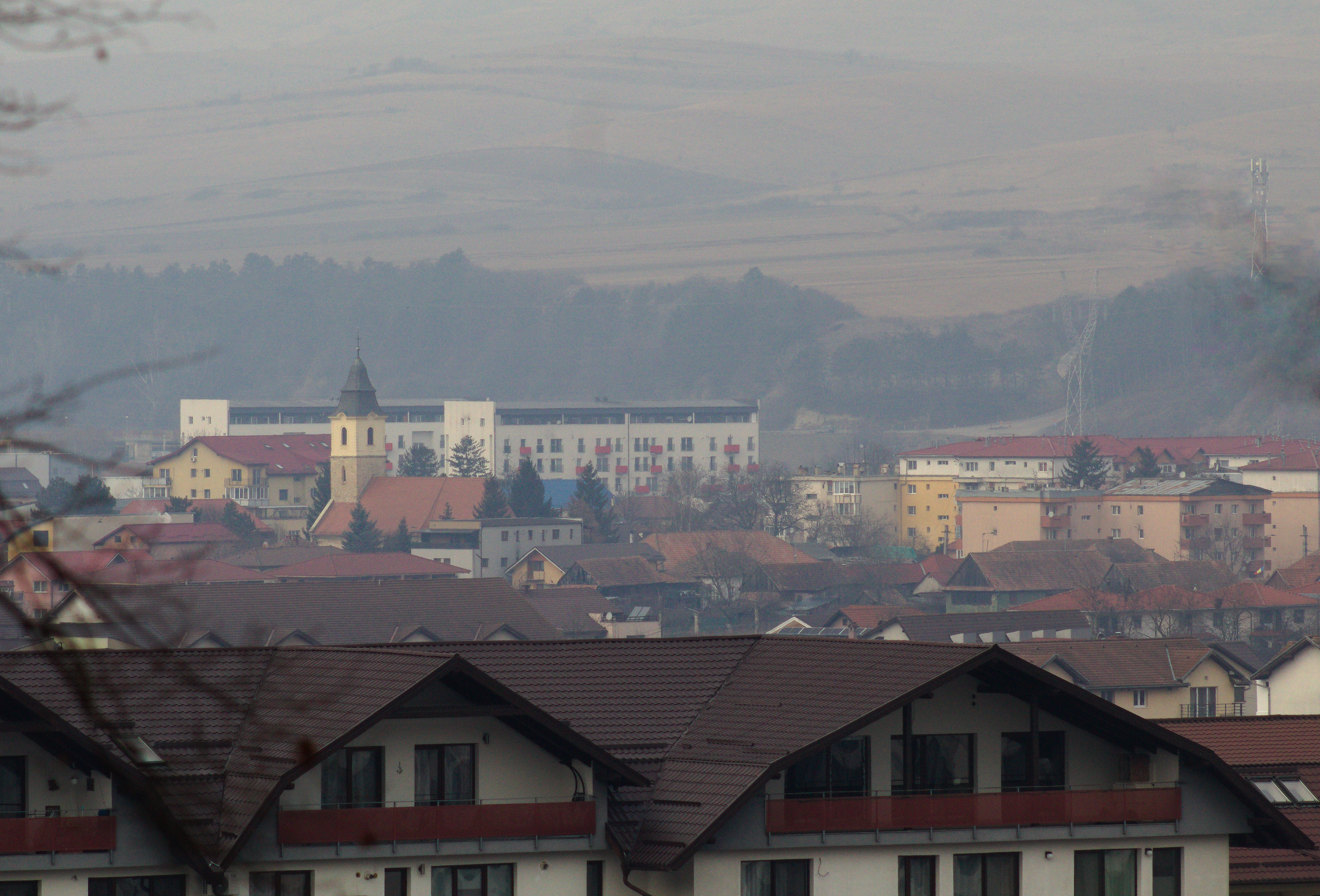

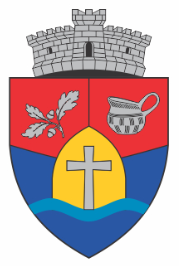
- Coat of arms

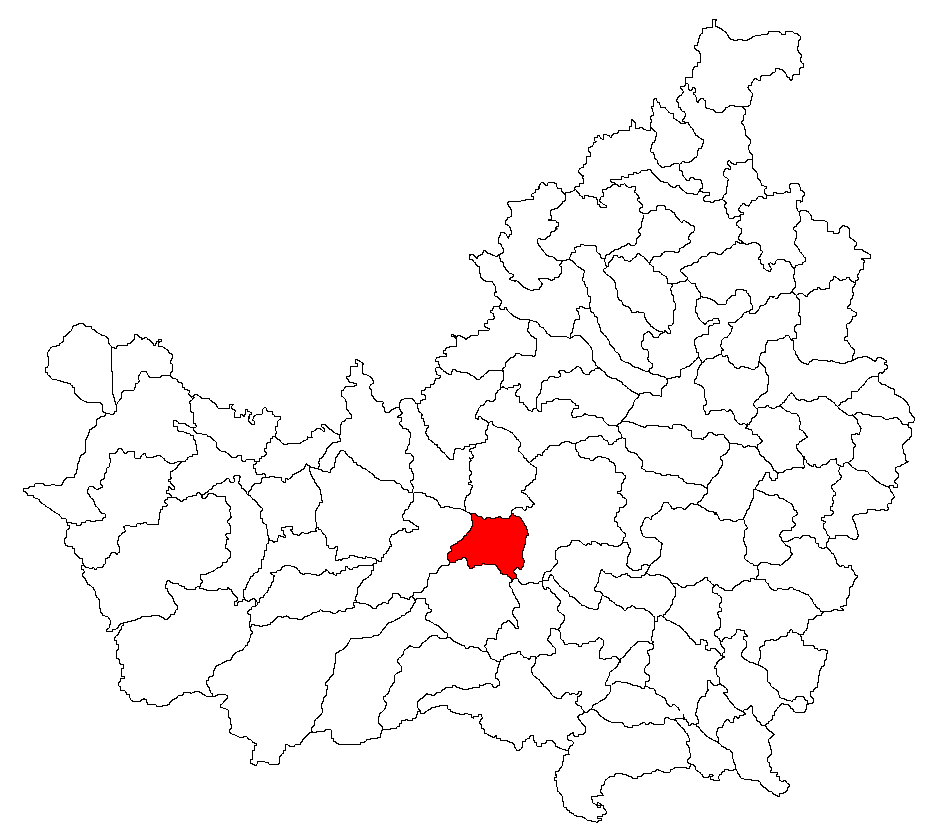
- Location in Cluj County

- Location in Romania
- Coordinates: 46°44′51″N 23°29′27″E
- Country: Romania
- County: Cluj
- Subdivisions: Florești, Luna de Sus, Tăuți

Government
  - Mayor (2024–2028): Bogdan-Nicolae Pivariu (PNL)
- Area: 61.29 km^{2} (23.66 sq mi)
- Elevation: 371 m (1,217 ft)
- Population (2021-12-01): 52,735
  - Density: 860.4/km^{2} (2,228/sq mi)
- Time zone: UTC+02:00 (EET)
  - Summer (DST): UTC+03:00 (EEST)
- Postal code: 407280
- Area code: +(40) x64
- Vehicle reg.: CJ
- Website: floresticluj.ro

Florești (known as Feneșu Săsesc until 1924; Hungarian: Szászfenes; German: Sächsisch Fenesch) is a commune in Cluj County, Transylvania, Romania. It is composed of three villages: Florești, Luna de Sus (Magyarlóna), and Tăuți (Kolozstótfalu) and is part of the Cluj-Napoca metropolitan area, being located less than 8 km (5 mi) west of Cluj-Napoca on DN1.

Benefiting from its proximity to Cluj-Napoca, the commune has seen a substantial development since the early 2000s, mainly due to several new residential developments. With 52,735 inhabitants, it was the most populous commune in Romania recorded at the 2021 census.

== Geography ==
Florești is located on the river Someșul Mic, in the centre of Cluj County, less than 12 km from the county capital, Cluj-Napoca, and 7 km from the commune of Gilău, on the Romanian National Road DN1.

== Demographics ==
According to the 2021 census, the commune has 52,735 inhabitants, meaning that an increase of 131.1% was recorded since the previous census of 2011, when 22,813 inhabitants were recorded. In terms of ethnic structure, the commune's population is composed of 70.6% Romanians, 8.9% Hungarians, and 1.21% Roma.

=== Historical population ===
The historical population of the entire commune as recorded by the official censuses, and projected to the present-day administrative unit, was as follows:

Year	Total	Romanians	Hungarians	Roma
1850	3,009	1,549	1,197	227
1880	3,655	1,761	1,546	n/a
1890	4,058	2,032	1,755	n/a
1900	4,435	2,260	1,995	n/a
1910	4,702	2,420	2,044	n/a
1920	4,956	2,567	2,251	n/a
1930	5,280	2,706	2,194	327
1941	6,086	2,612	3,364	95
1956	5,586	3,060	2,231	289
1966	6,012	3,248	2,399	369
1977	6,865	3,668	2,385	809
1992	6,088	3,439	2,020	626
2002	7,470	4,516	2,057	888
2011	22,813	17,154	3,276	1,116
2021	52,735	37,283	4,714	642
