= Someșul Mic =

River in northwestern Romania

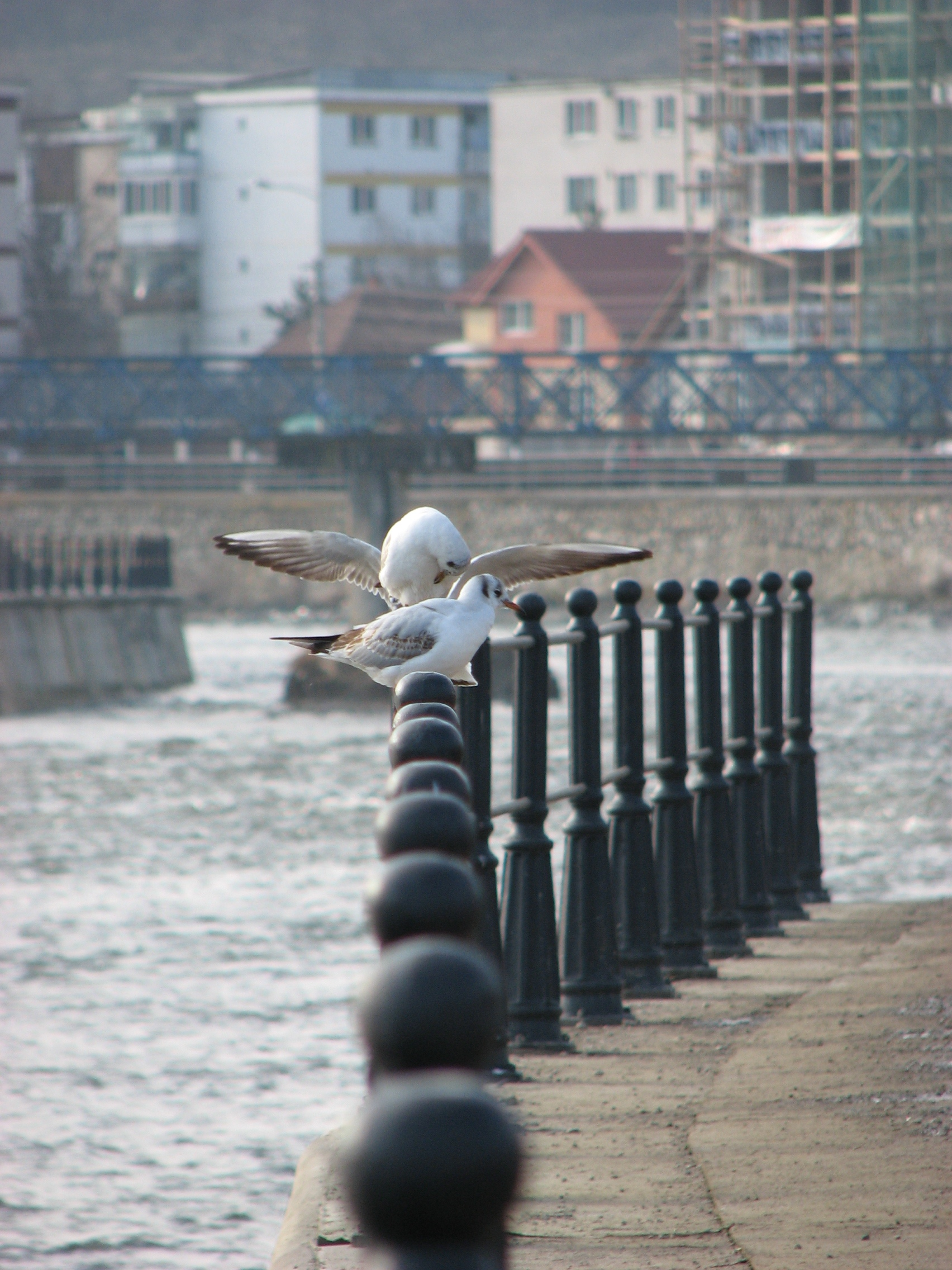
- Banks of Someșul Mic River in Cluj-Napoca

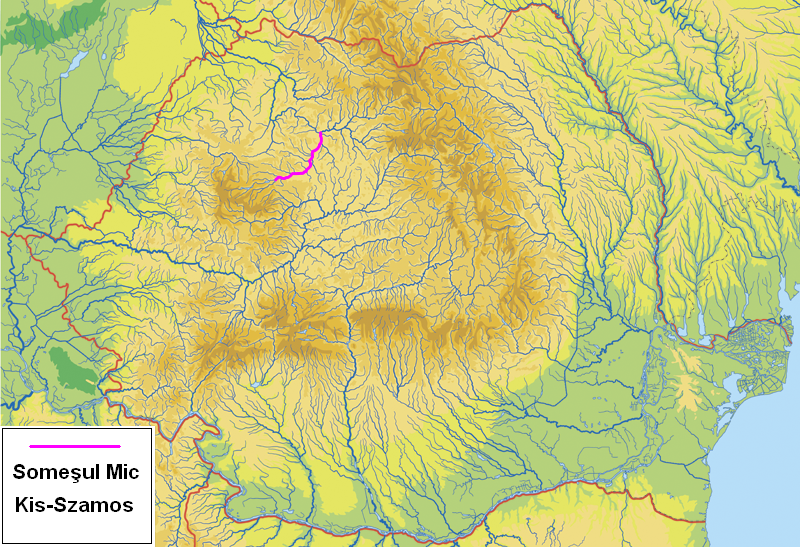

Location
- Country: Romania
- Counties: Cluj County
- Towns: Cluj-Napoca, Gherla, Dej

Physical characteristics
- Source: Confluence of the Someșul Rece and Someșul Cald
  - location: Gilău
- Mouth: Someș
  - location: near Dej
  - coordinates: 47°8′41″N 23°54′48″E
- Length: 178 km (111 mi)
- Basin size: 3,773 km^{2} (1,457 sq mi)

Basin features
- Progression: Someș→ Tisza→ Danube→ Black Sea
- Tributaries
  - left: Someșul Cald, Nadăș
  - right: Someșul Rece, Fizeș

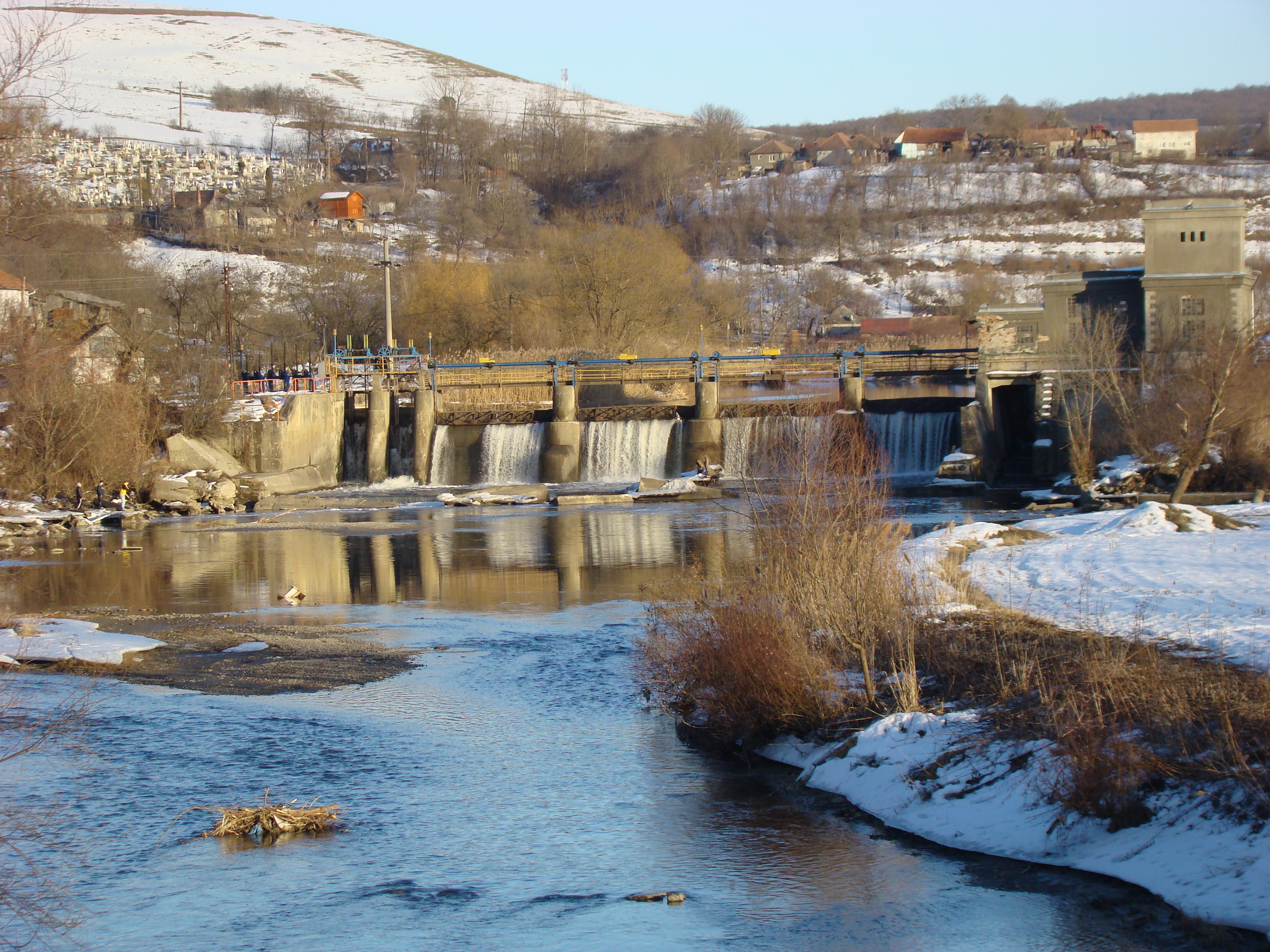
The Someșul Mic River at the Mănăstirea hydropower plant

The Someșul Mic (Little Someș, Hungarian: Kis-Szamos) is a river in north-western Romania (Cluj County). At its confluence with the Someșul Mare in Mica, the Someș is formed. Its total length is 178 km (111 mi), and its drainage basin area is 3,773 km^{2} (1,457 sq mi). It is formed at the confluence of two headwaters, Someșul Cald ("Warm Someș") and Someșul Rece ("Cold Someș"), that originate in the Apuseni Mountains. From the confluence, in Gilău, the Someșul Mic flows east and north through Cluj-Napoca, Apahida and Gherla, until it meets the Someșul Mare in Dej.

== Towns and villages ==
The following towns and villages are situated along the river Someșul Mic, from source to mouth: Gilău, Luna de Sus, Florești, Gârbău, Cluj-Napoca, Sânnicoară, Apahida, Jucu de Mijloc, Jucu de Sus, Răscruci, Bonțida, Fundătura, Iclozel, Livada, Hășdate, Gherla, Mintiu Gherlii, Petrești, Salatiu, Mănăstirea, Mica.

== Tributaries ==
The following rivers are tributaries to the river Someșul Mic:

- Left: Someșul Cald, Căpuș, Nadăș, Pârâul Chintenilor, Valea Caldă, Feiurdeni, Borșa, Lonea, Lujerdiu, Valea Mărului, Orman, Nima, Pârâul Ocnei
- Right: Someșul Rece, Feneș, Gârbău, Becaș, Zăpodie, Mărăloiu, Gădălin, Fizeș, Bandău
