= Gârbău, Cluj =

Gârbău Magyargorbó
- Commune
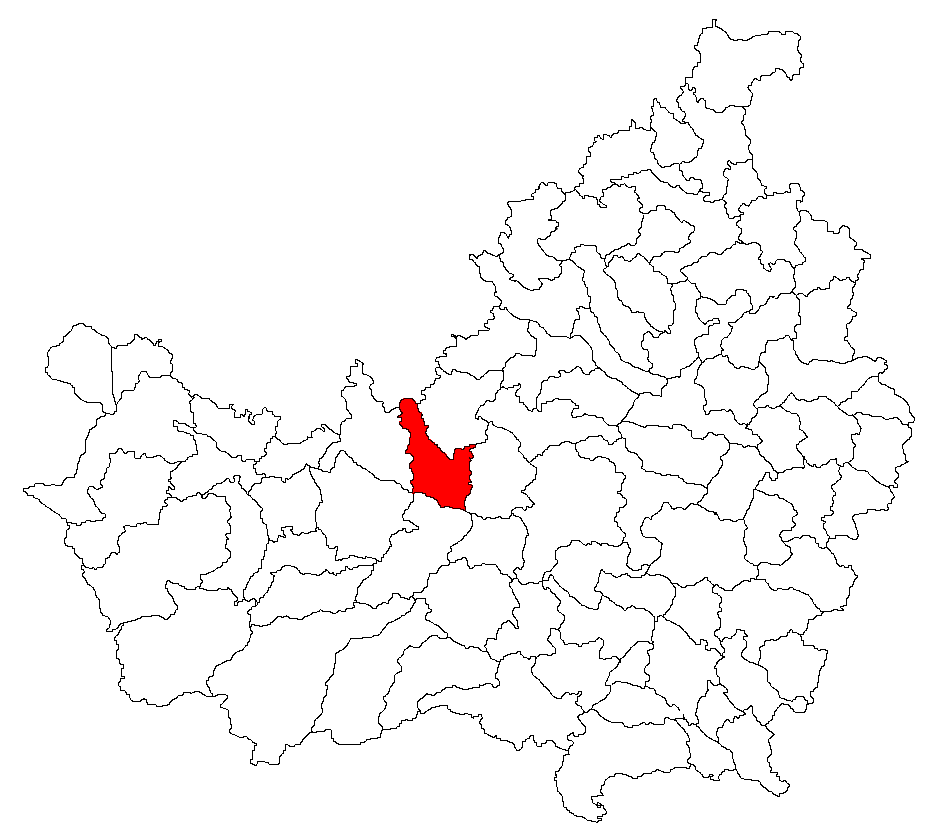
- Location in Cluj County

- Location in Romania
- Coordinates: 46°50′N 23°21′E
- Country: Romania
- County: Cluj
- Established: 1241
- Subdivisions: Cornești, Gârbău, Nădășelu, Turea, Viștea

Government
  - Mayor (2020–2024): Gheorghe-Lucian Broaina (PNL)
- Area: 73 km^{2} (28 sq mi)
- Population (2021-12-01): 2,133
  - Density: 29/km^{2} (76/sq mi)
- Time zone: EET/EEST (UTC+2/+3)
- Area code: +40 x64
- Vehicle reg.: CJ
- Website: www.primariagarbau.ro

Gârbău (Hungarian: Magyargorbó; German: Görbau) is a commune in Cluj County, Transylvania, Romania. It is composed of five villages: Cornești (Sólyomtelke), Gârbău, Nădășelu (Magyarnádas), Turea (Türe) and Viștea (Magyarvista).

== Demographics ==
At the 2011 census, 48.8% of inhabitants were Romanians, 44.3% Hungarians and 4.0% Roma.
