= Apahida =

- Commune
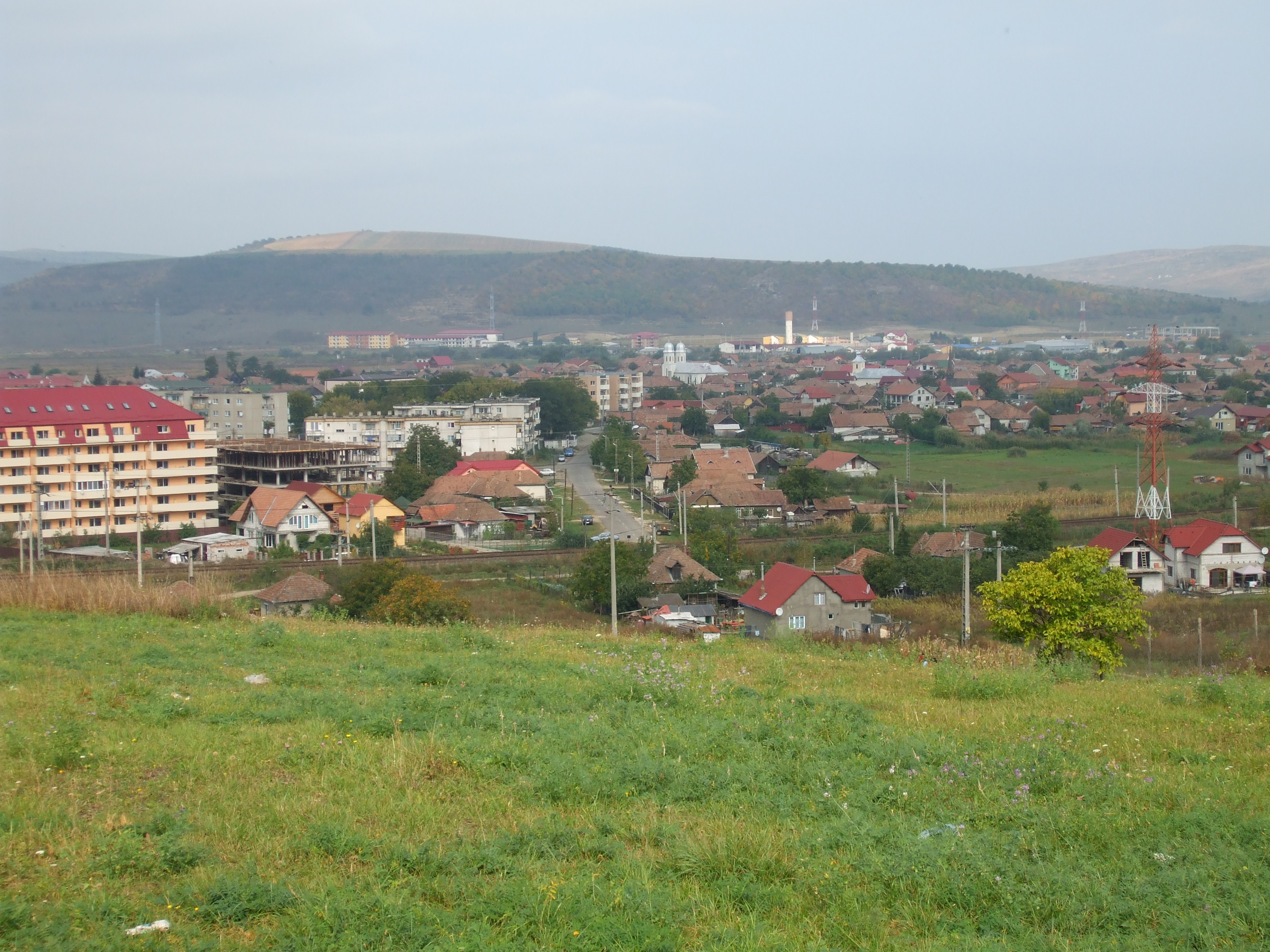

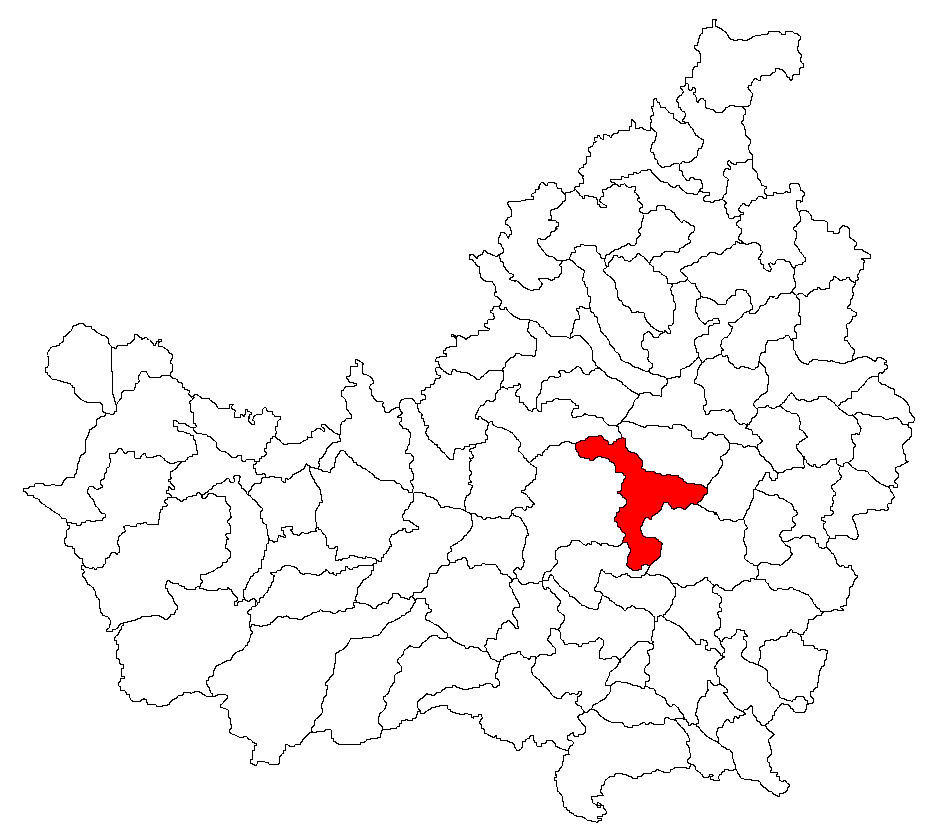
- Location in Cluj County

- Location in Romania
- Coordinates: 46°48′28″N 23°44′24″E
- Country: Romania
- County: Cluj
- Established: 1263
- Subdivisions: Apahida, Bodrog, Câmpeneşti, Corpadea, Dezmir, Pata, Sânnicoară, Sub Coastă

Government
  - Mayor (2020–2024): Grigore Fati (PSD)
- Area: 106.02 km^{2} (40.93 sq mi)
- Elevation: 303 m (994 ft)
- Population (2021-12-01): 17,239
  - Density: 162.60/km^{2} (421.14/sq mi)
- Time zone: UTC+02:00 (EET)
  - Summer (DST): UTC+03:00 (EEST)
- Postal code: 407035
- Area code: +40 x64
- Vehicle reg.: CJ
- Website: www.primaria-apahida.ro

Apahida (Hungarian: Apahida; German: Bruckendorf; Latin: Pons Abbatis) is a commune in Cluj County, Transylvania, Romania. It is composed of eight villages: Apahida, Bodrog (Bodrog), Câmpenești, Corpadea (Kolozskorpád), Dezmir (Dezmér), Pata (Kolozspata), Sânnicoară (Szamosszentmiklós), and Sub Coastă (Telekfarka).

In 1889 and 1968 two rich archaeological treasures were discovered here. Apahida is an important road junction in Cluj County, as it links the county with Mureș County, through national road DN16. It also provides quick access (approximately 20 minutes) from Cluj-Napoca to Băile Cojocna, famous for its salt waters and their curing properties.

== Demographics ==
Historical population
Year	Pop.	±%
1850	2,658	—
1880	2,926	+10.1%
1890	3,471	+18.6%
1900	3,853	+11.0%
1910	4,409	+14.4%
1920	4,536	+2.9%
1930	5,870	+29.4%
1941	6,789	+15.7%
1956	6,621	−2.5%
1966	7,621	+15.1%
1977	8,765	+15.0%
1992	7,640	−12.8%
2002	8,785	+15.0%
2011	10,685	+21.6%
2021	17,239	+61.3%
Source: Census data

At the 2021 Romanian census, Apahida had a population of 17,239. Of this population, 80.07% were ethnic Romanians, 3.7% were ethnic Hungarians, and 1.9% ethnic Romani.

== People ==
- Ioan Lemeni (1780–1861), prelate, Bishop of Făgăraș and Primate of the Romanian Greek Catholic Church
