= Iclod =

- Commune
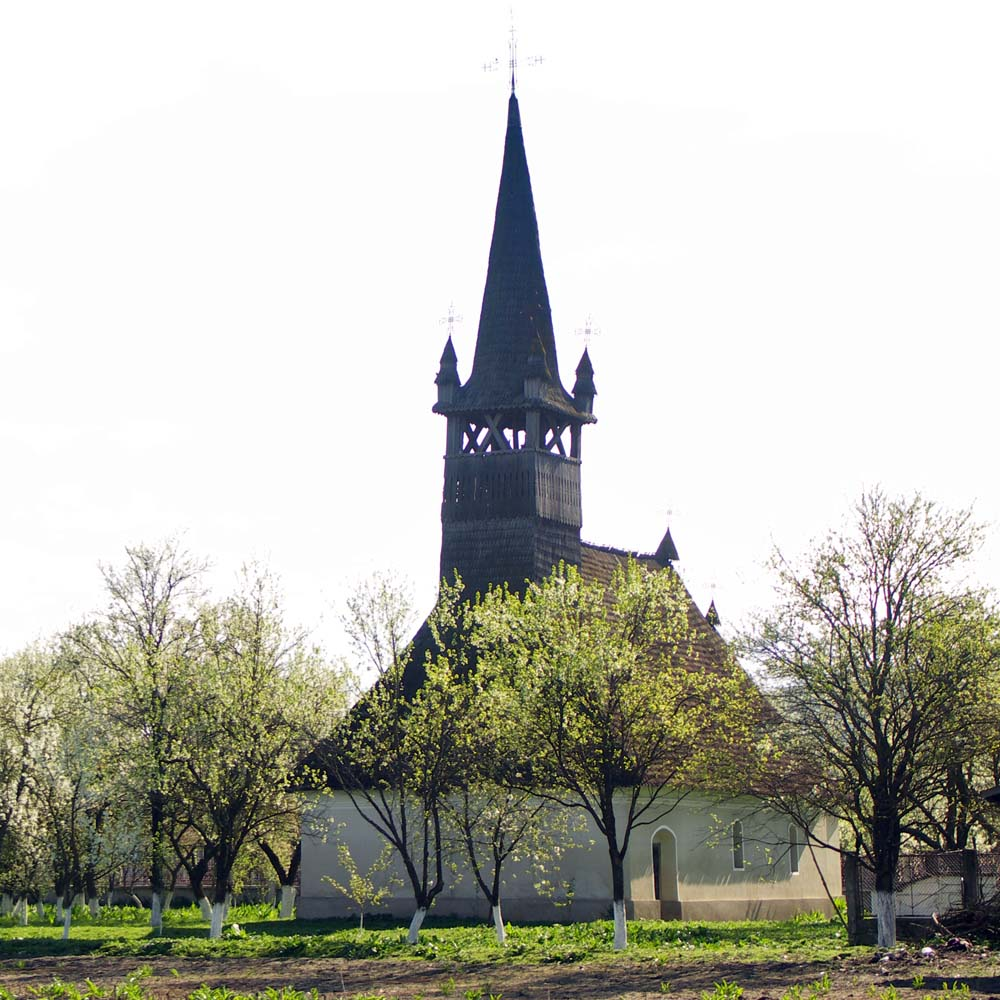
- Church of the Ascension in Iclod

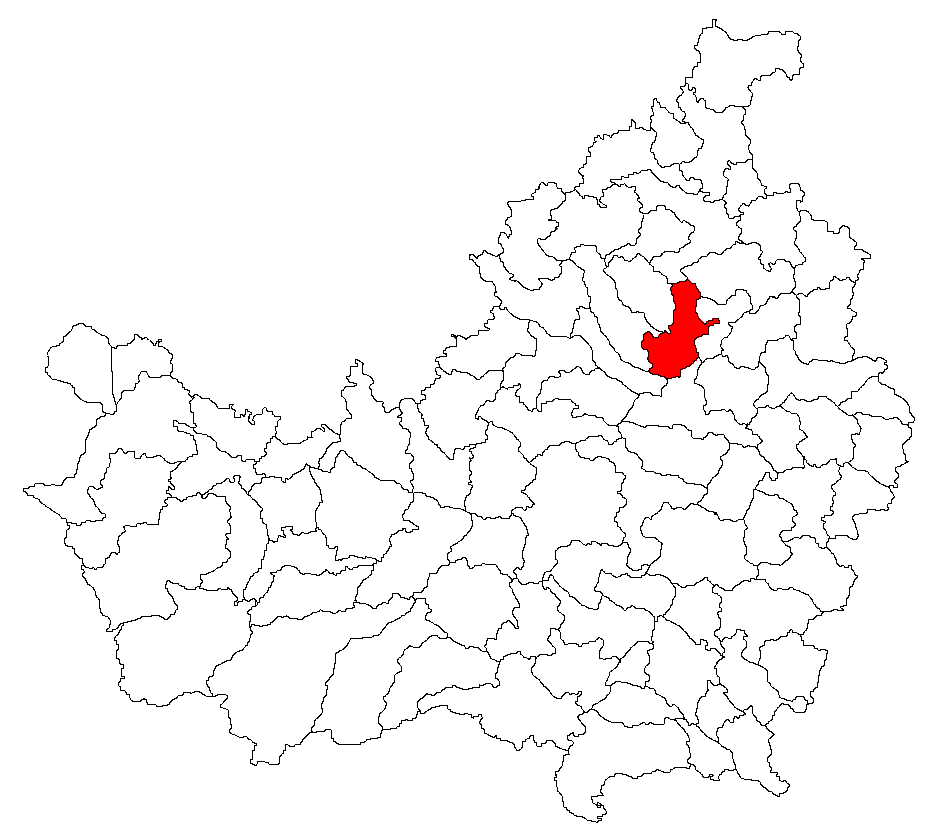
- Location in Cluj County

- Location in Romania
- Coordinates: 46°59′00″N 23°48′30″E
- Country: Romania
- County: Cluj
- Established: 1320
- Subdivisions: Fundătura, Iclod, Iclozel, Livada, Orman

Government
  - Mayor (2020–2024): Emil Ioan Pîrțoc (Ind.)
- Area: 67.93 km^{2} (26.23 sq mi)
- Elevation: 268 m (879 ft)
- Population (2021-12-01): 3,825
  - Density: 56.31/km^{2} (145.8/sq mi)
- Time zone: UTC+02:00 (EET)
  - Summer (DST): UTC+03:00 (EEST)
- Postal code: 407335
- Area code: +(40) x64
- Vehicle reg.: CJ
- Website: www.primariaiclod.ro

Iclod (Hungarian: Nagyiklód; German: Grossikladen) is a commune in Cluj County, Transylvania, Romania. It is composed of five villages: Fundătura (Szamosjenő), Iclod, Iclozel (Kisiklód), Livada (Dengeleg), and Orman (Ormány).

== Demographics ==
According to the census from 2002 there were 4,420 people living in this commune; of this population, 95.11% were ethnic Romanians, 2.55% ethnic Hungarians, and 2.26% ethnic Roma. At the 2021 census, Iclod had a population of 3,825; of those, 85.46% were Romanians and 1.78% Roma.

== Natives ==
- Ioan Bob (1739–1830), Bishop of Făgăraș and Primate of the Romanian Greek Catholic Church
- Kálmán Esterházy (1830–1915), Hungarian noble and politician
- Gheorghe Moceanu (1838–1909), physical education teacher
