= Borșa (river) =

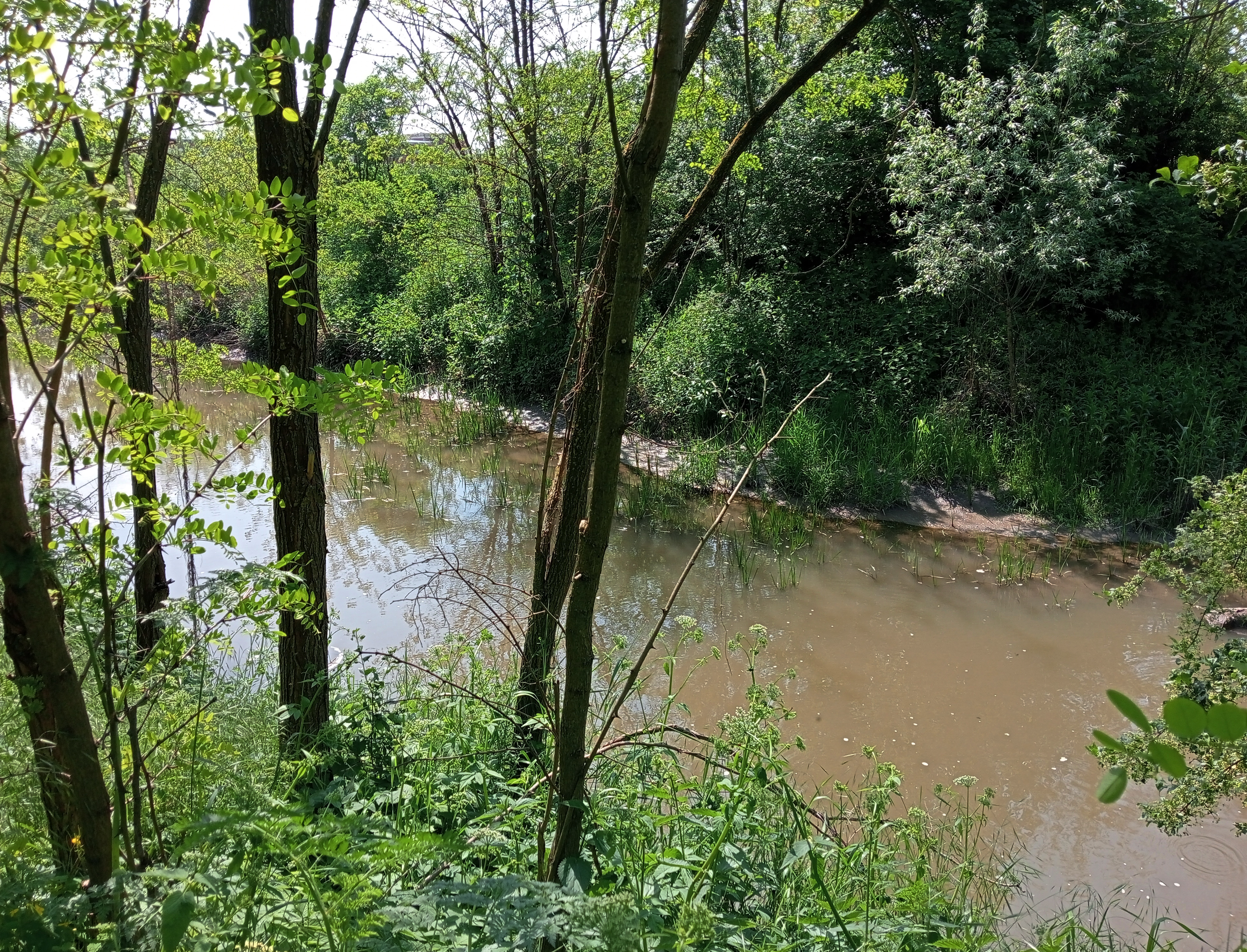
- The river at Răscruci

- Location within Romania

Location
- Country: Romania
- Counties: Cluj County
- Villages: Așchileu Mic, Așchileu Mare, Vultureni, Borșa, Răscruci

Physical characteristics
- Mouth: Someșul Mic
  - location: Răscruci
  - coordinates: 46.9068°N 23.7849°E
- Length: 38 km (24 mi)
- Basin size: 267 km^{2} (103 sq mi)

Basin features
- Progression: Someșul Mic→ Someș→ Tisza→ Danube→ Black Sea

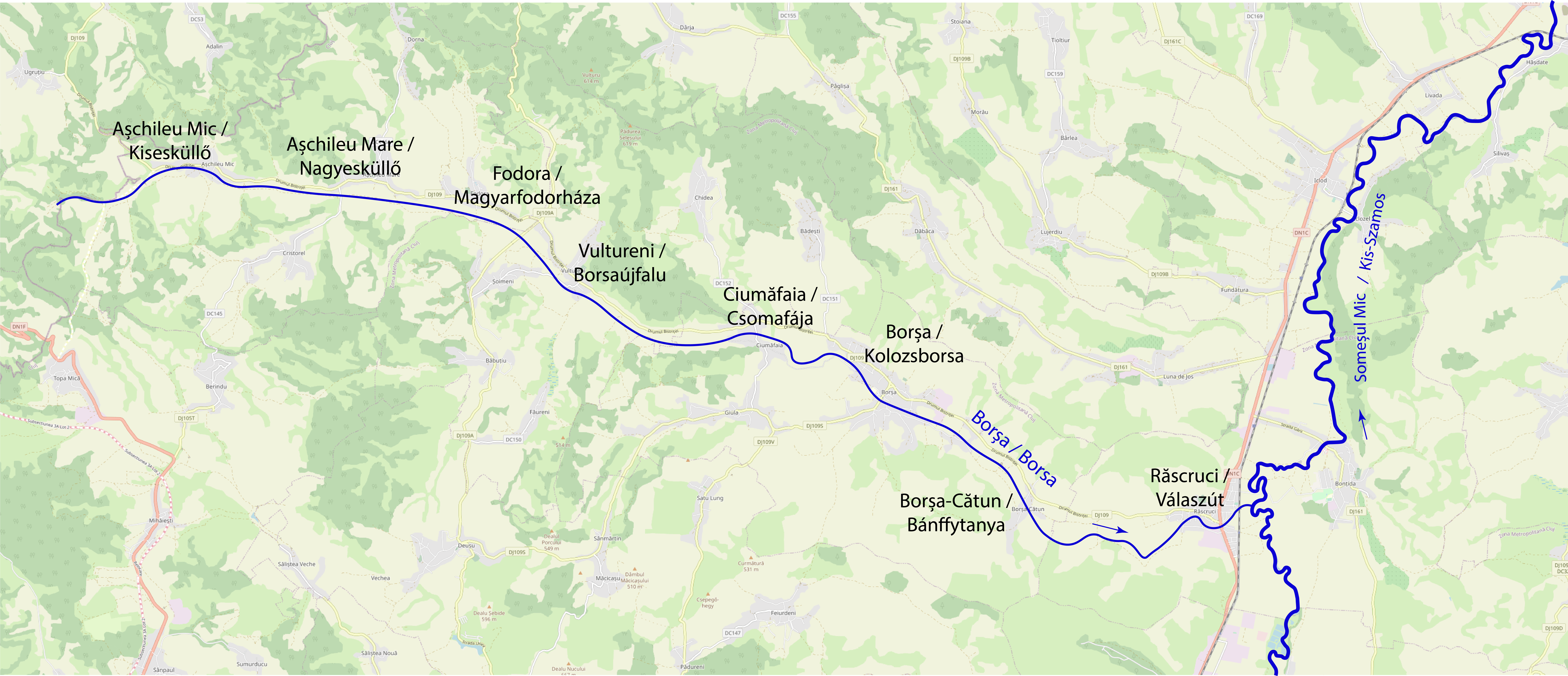
The course of the river

The Borșa is a left tributary of the river Someșul Mic in Romania. It discharges into the Someșul Mic in Răscruci. Its length is 38 km (24 mi) and its basin size is 267 km^{2} (103 sq mi).

The following rivers are tributaries to the river Borșa:

- Left: Valea Rece, Fundături, Chidea, Bădești
- Right: Cristorel, Șoimeni, Făureni, Giula
