= Cluj-Napoca metropolitan area =

Cluj Metropolitan Area
- Metropolitan area
- Coordinates: 46°46′N 23°35′E
- Country: Romania
- County: Cluj County
- Central Municipality: Cluj-Napoca
- Other localities: Aiton, Apahida, Baciu, Bonțida, Borșa, Căianu, Chinteni, Ciurila, Cojocna, Feleacu, Florești, Gârbău, Gilău, Jucu, Săvădisla, Sânpaul, Tureni, Vultureni
- Functional: 2008

Area
  - Total: 1,603 km^{2} (619 sq mi)

Population (2021 census)
  - Total: 425,130
  - Density: 266/km^{2} (690/sq mi)
- Time zone: UTC+2 (EET)
  - Summer (DST): UTC+3 (EEST)
- Postal Code: 40wxyz^{1}
- Area code: +40 x64^{2}
- Website: www.clujmet.ro
- ^{1}w, x, y, and z are digits that indicate the street, part of the street, or even the building of the address^{2}x is a digit indicating the operator: 2 for the former national operator, Romtelecom, and 3 for the other ground telephone networks

The Cluj metropolitan area is a metropolitan area in Cluj County, which includes Cluj-Napoca and 18 communes nearby: Aiton, Apahida, Baciu, Bonțida, Borșa, Căianu, Chinteni, Ciurila, Feleacu, Florești, Gilău, Gârbau, Jucu, Petreștii de Jos, Săvădisla, Sânpaul, Tureni, Vultureni.

The total area of the metropolitan area is 1,364 km^{2} (527 sq mi), which comprises 24% of the territory of Cluj County. According to the 2021 census, the population of the 20 administrative units totals 420,839 people, of whom 286,598 live in Cluj-Napoca.

== Population ==
Population census
Year	2011	2021
Pop.	418,153	420,839
±%	—	+0.6%

According to the 2021 census, these are the populations of each of the administrative units that comprise the Cluj Metropolitan Area:

Administrative unit	Inhabitants	Romanians	Hungarians	Roma
Cluj-Napoca	286,598	249,002	49,425	824
Florești	52,735	17,578	3,258	730
Apahida	10,685	9,493	408	75
Baciu	10,317	6,580	3,095	325
Gilău	8,300	7,141	706	109
Bonțida	4,856	3,613	765	297
Săvădisla	4,392	1,975	2,264	60
Jucu	4,270	3,608	501	21
Feleacu	3,923	2,932	891	4
Chinteni	3,065	2,370	539	10
Gârbău	2,440	1,248	1,075	49
Sânpaul	2,382	1,972	22	261
Căianu	2,355	1,431	852	-
Tureni	2,278	1,633	562	5
Borșa	1,600	1,431	107	18
Ciurila	1,594	1,500	18	*
Vultureni	1,516	1,273	165	36
Petreștii de Jos	1,512	1,446	3	4
Aiton	1,085	918	118	-
Total	425,130	319,970	65,463	3,215

== History ==
The Cluj Metropolitan Area was legally established in the fall of 2008 as an inter-community development association, having as founders the municipality of Cluj-Napoca, the Cluj County Council and 17 communes in the vicinity of Cluj. In 2009, the commune of Sânpaul joined the metropolitan area, and in 2016, the commune of Săvădisla joined in.

== Objectives ==
The objectives pursued by the Cluj Metropolitan Area Intercommunity Development Association are:

- Enhancing knowledge-based economic competitiveness.
- The development and upgrading of transport infrastructure.
- To protect and improve the quality of the environment.
- Human resources development, employment growth, and the struggle against social exclusion.
- The development of the rural economy and the increase of productivity in the agricultural sector.
- Balanced participation to the socio-economic development process for all the administrative units of the Cluj Metropolitan Area.

== Projects ==
The Cluj Metropolitan Area, as a leader or partner, has carried out or runs a number of projects with European Union funding or from EEA and Norwegian Grants. They include:

- “European Digital Citizens” (Eudigit)
- URBforDAN. Management and Use of Urban Foreres as Natural Heritage in Danube Cities
- The Lab Cluj. Metropolitan Laboratory for Social Innovation
- Pata 2. Replicable integrated interventions for inclusive housing and combating marginalisation in Cluj Metropolitan Area
- Cluj Future of Work, „Informal Work” Work Package
