= Bánffytanya =

Bánffytanya is the Hungarian name for two villages in Romania:

- Borşa-Cătun village, Borşa Commune, Cluj County
- Sărmăşel-Gară village, Sărmaşu Town, Mureș County
