= Fodora =

Fodora may refer to several villages in Romania:

- Fodora, a village in Aşchileu Commune, Cluj County
- Fodora, a village in Gâlgău Commune, Sălaj County
