= Esküllő =

Esküllő is the Hungarian name for two communes in Romania:

- Aștileu Commune, Bihor County
- Așchileu Commune, Cluj County
