= Giula =

River in Romania

- Location within Romania

Location
- Country: Romania
- Counties: Cluj County
- Villages: Sânmărtin, Giula, Borșa

Physical characteristics
- Mouth: Borșa
  - location: Borșa
  - coordinates: 46.9300°N 23.6651°E
- Length: 12 km (7.5 mi)
- Basin size: 46 km^{2} (18 sq mi)

Basin features
- Progression: Borșa→ Someșul Mic→ Someș→ Tisza→ Danube→ Black Sea
- Tributaries
  - right: Ciepega

The Giula is a right tributary of the river Borșa in Romania. It flows into the Borșa in the village Borșa. Its length is 12 km (7.5 mi) and its basin size is 46 km^{2} (18 sq mi).
