= Jacob Salomon =

Jewish military commander (1916-1963)

Jacob (Eugen, Jean) Salomon
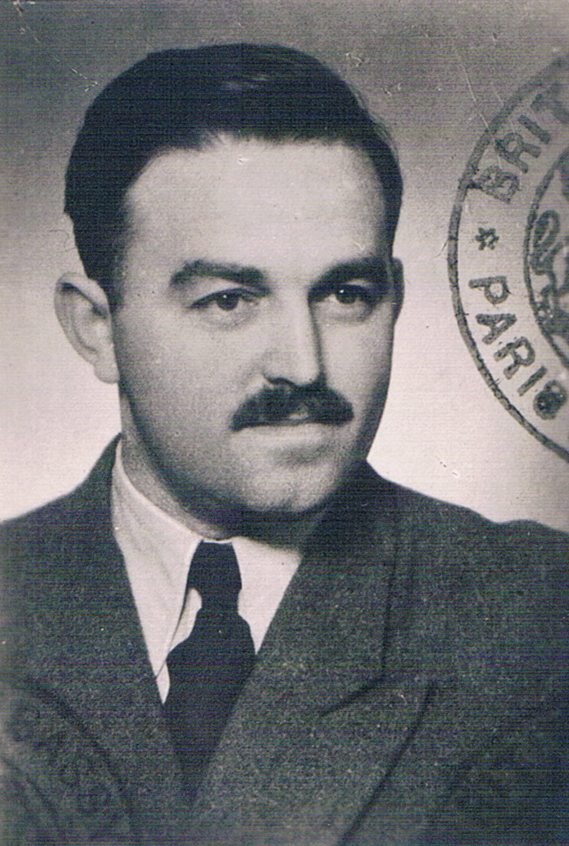
- Jacob Salomon
- Native name: יעקב סלומון
- Born: 30 May 1916; Sólyomkő, Austria-Hungary (now Șoimeni, Romania)
- Died: 17 October 1963 (aged 47) Israel
- Buried: Kiryat Shaul Cemetery
- Branch: Palmach; Haganah; Israel Defense Forces
- Service years: 1934 - 1948
- Commands: commander of the "Company of 100", Haganah, Petah-Tkva; commander of "HaSharon Company", The Field Companies, Haganah; commander of the 4th Battalion, Palmach; commander of Haganah in Eastern Europe; commander of "The Czech Brigade".

Jacob (Yankele), Eugen, Jean Salomon (Hebrew: יעקב (יענקלה) סלומון; May 30, 1916 – October 17, 1963) was a member of the Haganah and Palmach. He commanded the Palmach's Fourth Battalion and served as commander of the Haganah in Eastern Europe.

== Early life ==
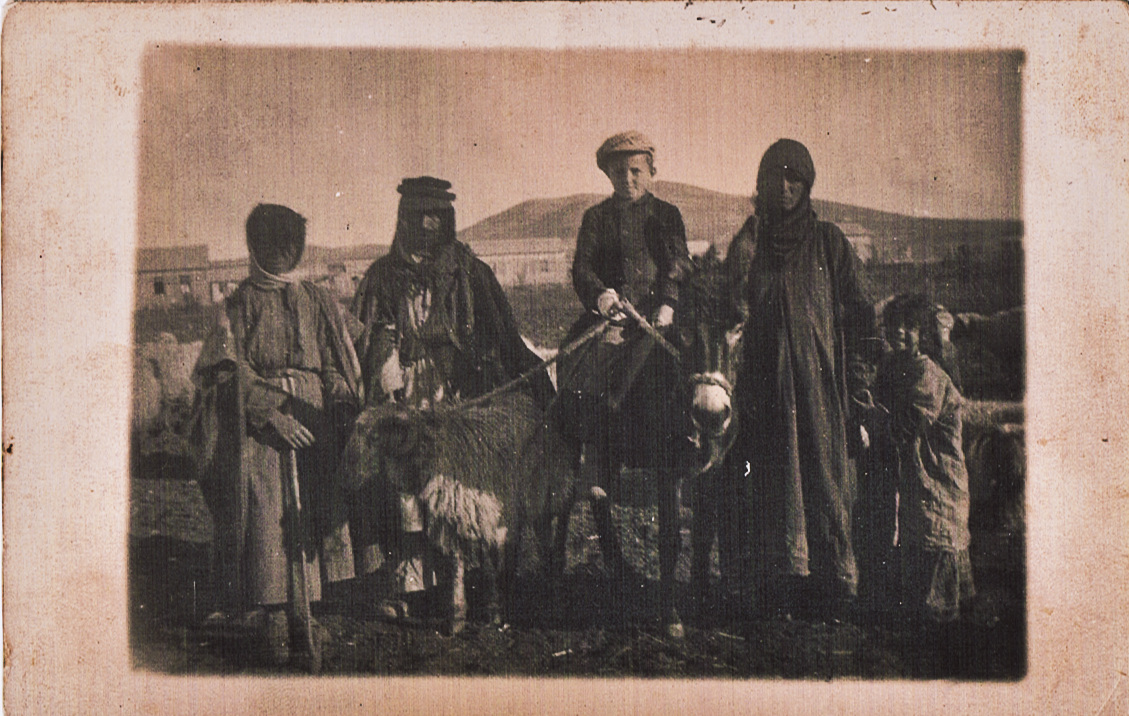
Jacob Salomon childhood, Jezreel Valley 1920s

Salomon was the youngest of eight brothers and sisters, two of whom died in infancy. He was born to an Orthodox Jewish family in the village of Shoyomko. Known in Hungarian as Sólyomkő and in Romanian as Șoimeni, it was located in the Transylvania region of Austria-Hungary, becoming part of Romania several years later, and is situated north of Cluj. His parents made a living from farming. In 1920, Salomon's father, Mordechai, traveled to Mandatory Palestine. He and two friends, one of whom was the son of the rabbi of Cluj, set out to investigate the possibility of bringing a group of one hundred farming families to settle there. In 1924, the family immigrated to Mandatory Palestine and were among the founders of Kfar Gidon (in the Jezreel Valley), where they worked in agriculture. In 1929, economic difficulties led several families (among them the Salomon family) to relocate to Jerusalem. Later, in 1934, Salomon's family moved to Petah Tikva.

== Haganah in Petah Tikva ==
Salomon joined the Petah Tikva branch of the Haganah (the Jewish underground in the British Mandate period) in summer 1934. At this time, the branches of the Haganah in various Jewish settlements were relatively independent, and they mainly engaged in defending Jewish settlements from within. During the "Great Arab Revolt," Eliyahu Ben Hur, commander of the Petah Tikva area, appointed Salomon deputy commander and later commander of the "Company of 100 [fighters]" (so called because it was made up of 100 fighters). This was one of the first units of the Haganah to adopt the tactic of going out beyond the settlement's borders, thus extending the lines of defense and taking initiative. The unit was also among the first to espouse the perception of the Haganah as a national organization, and accordingly its members were willing to be sent wherever they were needed.

== The Field Companies ==
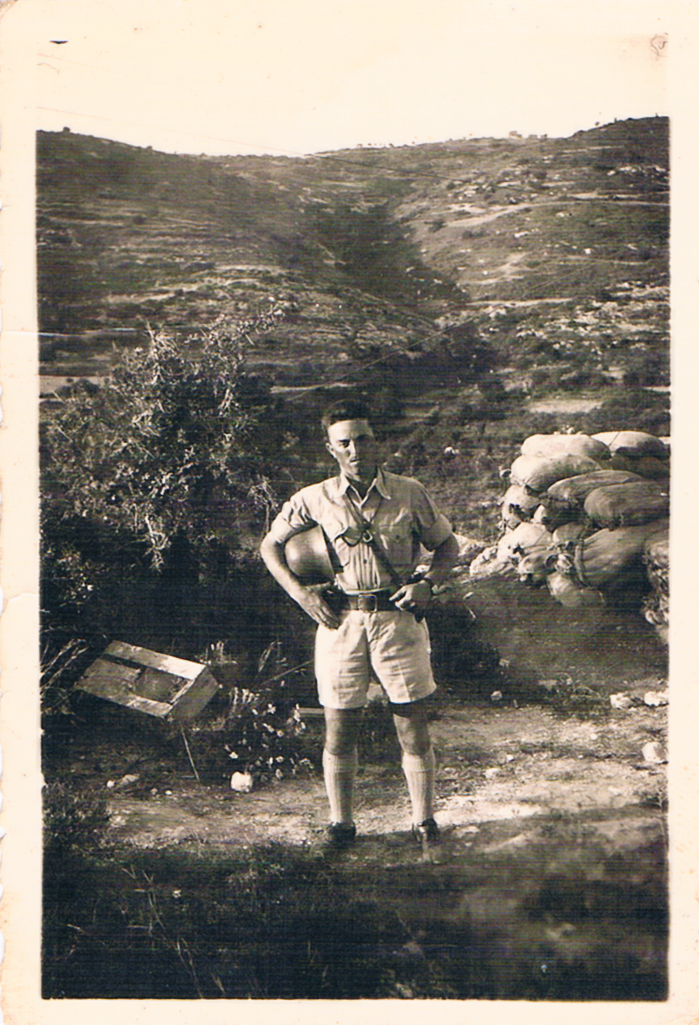
Jacob Salomon Kibbutz Hanita

At the end of 1937, the Haganah established "The Field Companies"—national units that were created to combat the Great Arab Revolt. The commander of these units, Yitzhak Sadeh, asked Salomon to join their training program and subsequently to become an instructor himself. In this period, Salomon joined two patrols under the command of Orde Wingate, learning to work in larger units. Shortly afterwards he was appointed deputy commander of "HaSharon Company," later becoming its commander. This company, one of two serving on the "Eastern Front," controlled the area from Hadera to the Yarkon. Together with the British, it fended off groups of Arab aggressors. The activity of The Field Companies on the eastern and southern fronts is considered the peak of Haganah operations in the period of the Arab Revolt.

== Imprisonment in Acre (The 43 Haganah prisoners) ==
In summer 1939, following the suppression of the Arab Revolt and the dismantlement of The Field Companies, Salomon was sent to instruct a course for Haganah commanding officers under the command of Rafael Lev. His fellow instructors included (among others) Yigal Allon and Moshe Dayan. The course was to train commanders for the Field Corps (Hish), a new and larger force designed to replace The Field Companies.

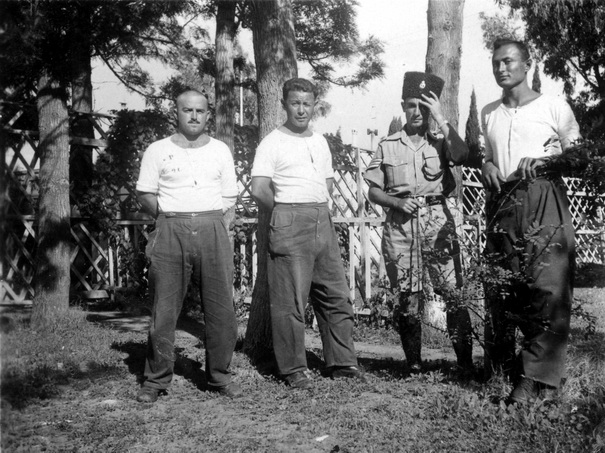
Acre Prison, 1939 (" The 43 Haganah Prisoners") Course Instructors: Yaakov Salomon (left), Moshe Carmel (second left), Moshe Dayan (right)

In October 1939, the British, who withdrew their support of Zionism after seeing the results of the Arab Revolt, discovered the second session of this course and arrested the participants and instructors. Those arrested were tried and sentenced to ten years in prison, which was reduced by the regional military commander to five years' incarceration. This group was known as the "43 Haganah prisoners." Salomon was chosen as one of the members of the prisoners' committee. Furthermore, his command of Arabic enabled him to mediate between his comrades and the guards and Arab prisoners. An additional change in the British policy, following the developments in World War II and the growing fear of a German invasion, led to the early release of Salomon and his fellow prisoners in February 1941.

== Palmach ==
=== Position at headquarters ===
In mid-1941, as fear of an invasion by Germany and the Axis powers grew, the Palmach—the Haganah's elite fighting force—was established. Salomon joined the Palmach upon its establishment and at first served in various positions at its headquarters. In 1942, he was appointed commander of the first national course for applied sports, and at the end of 1942 he was chosen to command the first naval courses. Salomon had no experience in these fields but was chosen because of his command and organizational abilities.

In parallel, at the request of Moshe Dayan, Salomon began recruiting Hungarian-speaking volunteers to parachute into Europe. Among them was his nephew, the paratrooper Yona Rosen, through whom he also located further volunteers, including Hannah Senesh (Szenes). From the end of 1943, Salomon joined the activities of the "Balkan Platoon," which was to reach southeast Europe, where it would endeavor to save local Jews and organize armed resistance.

=== The Coast Guard ===
At the end of 1943, Salomon was appointed to command the southern company of the Coast Guard. The Coast Guard, established by the British in 1941, when the fear of a German and Axis invasion of the areas under the British Mandate intensified, was composed of police companies. Its members included both Jews and Arabs, who were formally under the purview of the British police. Jewish members of the unit ("Notrim") covertly followed the commands of the Haganah, and in 1943 they secretly joined the Palmach. The companies were dismantled at the end of 1944, after the danger of an invasion had passed.

=== The Fourth Battalion ===
In fall 1944, the Palmach underwent a structural reorganization and its companies were united into four battalions. The Seventh Company, the headquarters company with its special units, became the Fourth Battalion. This Battalion included units of marines (Palyam), undercover agents (mista'aravim), military scouts, pilots, and reserve units. It was planned that Shimon Avidan, the commander of the Seventh Company, would command the Battalion. However, when Avidan was appointed to another post, Yitzhak Sadeh, then commander of the Palmach, appointed Salomon in his place. His appointment was exceptional. Indeed, the other commanders had all been members of the Socialist Zionist Youth Movement Hamahanot Haolim, while Salomon had not been involved in this or any youth movement and had not declared allegiance to any political faction. Consequently, the other commanders viewed Salomon's appointment with hesitancy, but he received Sadeh's backing. Salomon commanded the Battalion during the period of the Jewish Resistance Movement, an umbrella organization for the various paramilitary organizations in the pre-state Jewish community, the Yishuv (the Haganah, Etzel, and Lehi), which was established following World War II in order to fight the British and bring about the end of the British Mandate. The Battalion played a role in various sabotage operations. Salomon completed his role in mid-1946, following the dismantlement of the Jewish Resistance Movement.

== Haganah in Eastern Europe ==
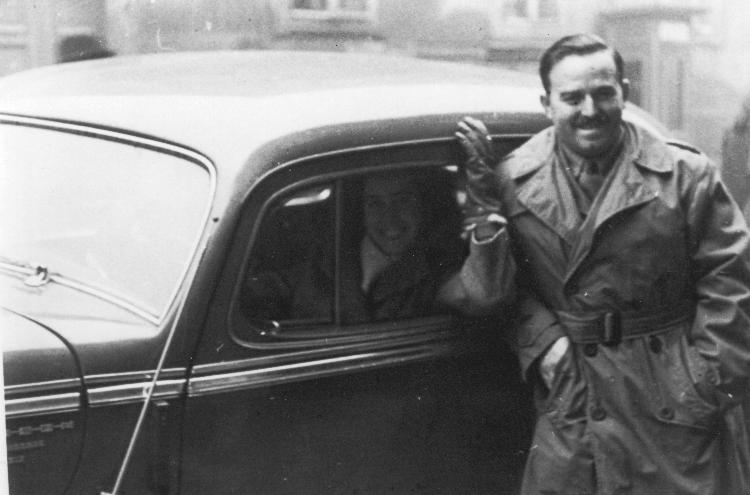
Jacob Salomon commander of Haganah east Europe 1947-1948

In December 1946, Salomon left for Europe, where he was appointed by Nachum Shadmi, commander of the Haganah in Europe, as commander of the Haganah in Eastern Europe: Hungary, Czechoslovakia, and Romania. In mid-1948, the Haganah was dismantled and Salomon continued his activities in Europe until the end of 1948, working in the framework of an IDF delegation.

=== Hungary ===
At the beginning of 1947, Salomon focused on establishing self-defense training for Jews in Hungary, helped by former members of the Jewish Zionist Underground Movement in Hungary (mahteret halutzit), led by Yosef (Yoshko) Meir, and Jewish emissaries from mandatory Palestine. Later he focused on exercises to train more than 1,200 recruits prior to departure for Mandatory Palestine. At the same time, he worked with HaMossad LeAliyah Bet and the Bricha Movement (which, following World War II, helped around 300,000 Jews flee from Eastern Europe to the central and southern parts of the Continent, from where they hoped to depart for Mandatory Palestine). At the beginning of his stay in Hungary, he and his team sought to uncover as much information as possible about Hannah Senesh's final days. Among other things, he followed the trial of the judge who had sentenced her to death and met with a prisoner who had shared her cell, thus discovering details about her last days.

=== Romania ===
An attempt to establish similar initiatives in Romania in 1947 was foiled by the Romanian authorities, which were under increasing Soviet influence. By contrast, the Romanian authorities allowed Jews to emigrate and cooperated with the Pan Ships illegal immigration operation, which involved the Pan Crescent and Pan York.

==== The Pan Ships ====
In the second half of 1947, Salomon commanded a land-based operation to recruit around 15,000 illegal Jewish immigrants from all over Romania, taking them to the port of Borges in Bulgaria, from where they were to set sail for Mandatory Palestine on the Pan Ships. Considering the extent of the operation—it was the largest operation conducted by HaMossad LeAliyah Bet —Shaul Avigur, head of HaMossad LeAliyah Bet requested the Haganah's help. Nachum Shadmi, commander of the Haganah in Europe, in turn tasked Salomon with recruiting the immigrants, and Salomon set about doing so by establishing a headquarters with 30 staff members, known as the "Operative Department," and by working in cooperation with the Romanian authorities. Despite the pressure exerted on them, Moshe Agami, commander of HaMossad LeAliyah Bet in Romania, together with Salomon, prevented attempts to dictate the recruitment of immigrants according to a party key. For the purposes of this operation, Salomon divided Romania into districts, with a local committee responsible for each district. In parallel, he ran training courses throughout Romania to prepare 800 commanders who would be responsible for supervising the immigrants during the journey. The preparations also included weapons training, for the eventuality of British attempts to prevent the immigrants from disembarking. However, when Nachum Shadmi discovered this, he forbade it. After a few months of preparation, the immigrants were taken to the port using the Romanian railway network, which was rerouted and requisitioned for this purpose. The trains arrived in coordination at the port from all over the country, and on the morning of December 12, 1947, the ships set sail.

The preparations for the operation met with the opposition of the Yishuv's leadership. This was due to international pressure led by the British to prevent the operation from going ahead and the fear of the ramifications that it would have on the efforts to establish the Jewish State via international political means. The commanders of the operation in Romania, among them Salomon, went ahead despite this opposition, seeing the distress of the thousands of Jews who had sold their property and were ready to leave their homes. Accordingly, the operation left the leadership of the Yishuv with the impression that its commanders had undermined their authority. Likewise, the ships set sail against the will of both the British and the Jewish leadership, with the two sides forced to negotiate as the ships crossed the sea. At the instruction of Ben-Gurion, an agreement was reached to redirect the ships to Cyprus, and, after the establishment of the State of Israel, the immigrants finally reached their destination.

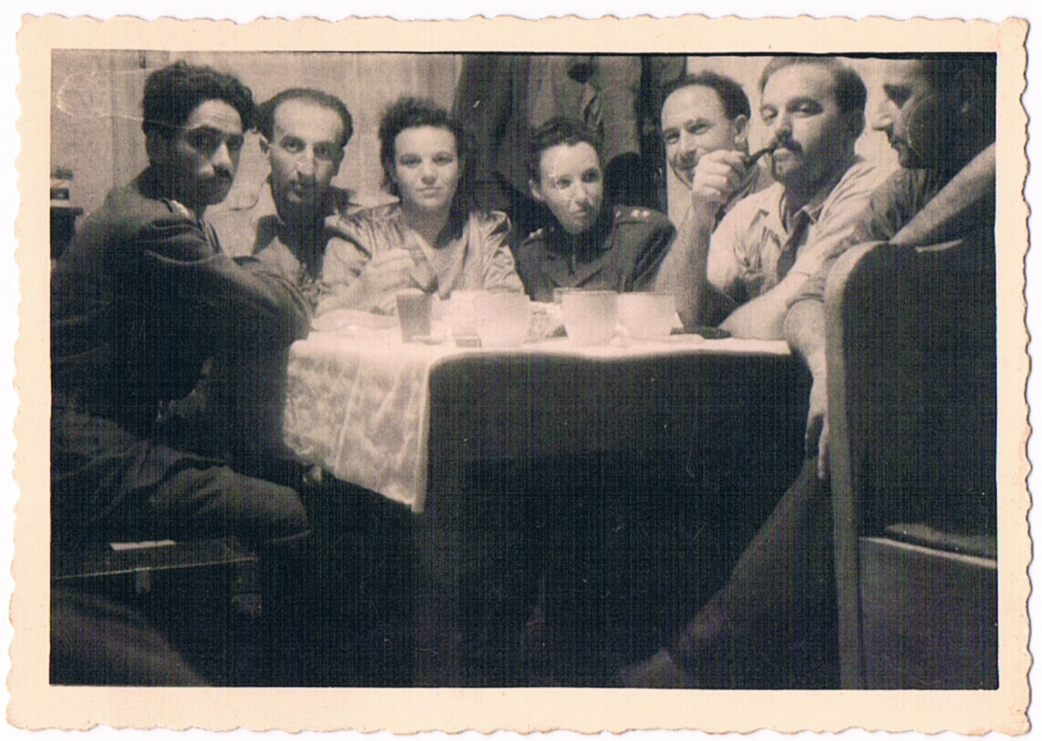
Jacob Salomon with Czechoslovak officers, Czechoslovakia, 1948

=== Recruitment from abroad (Gahal) ===
At the beginning of 1948, with the military struggle to establish the State of Israel underway, the Haganah in Europe began to recruit volunteers, training them and subsequently bringing them to Mandatory Palestine. Salomon was one of the architects of this process, and in March 1948 he established, together with Moshe Agami, a member of HaMossad LeAliyah Bet, a recruitment center in Paris. The Haganah trained around 25,000 recruits in Europe, amounting to between a quarter and a third of the IDF's manpower at the time. In parallel, Salomon was active in Czechoslovakia, in cooperation with Ehud Avriel, Ben-Gurion's emissary for purchasing affairs and later the Israeli envoy in Czechoslovakia. Salomon was involved in organizing professional courses run by the Czech army in fields such as communications, flying, and parachuting, and he appointed Haim Gouri as commander of the first paratrooper course. Salomon also commanded the initiative to recruit another fighting unit—the "Czech Brigade." However, due to fears of a Communist conspiracy, the security echelons prevented the operation of the unit in Israel. Rather, upon arrival, its members were allowed to enlist in various IDF units on an individual basis.

==== The Czech Brigade ====
The Czech Brigade—a unit of Jews from Czechoslovakia, most of them World War II veterans—was established in the framework of these recruitment activities, with the intention of enabling a large group of Jews to immigrate to Mandatory Palestine together with their families and property. The brigade was to include around 1,500 recruits, although ultimately only 600 came to Israel. Its members trained in Czechoslovakia for around two months and were to arrive in Israel armed with weapons provided by the Czech authorities. Salomon was appointed to command the unit prior to its arrival in Israel, and he intended to lead it also during the War of Independence. In October 1948, Avriel and Salomon arrived in Israel and presented a report on the brigade to Ben-Gurion. However, concern among the security echelons regarding a Communist conspiracy led to its dispersion, and its members were allowed to integrate into the IDF individually, in various different units. It appears that international pressure was also exerted on the Czech authorities to prevent the dispatch of heavy armaments to Israel. Some of the recruits who arrived in Israel with the Czech Brigade established the moshav Kerem Maharal

== Final days ==
While in Europe, Salomon was frustrated by his inability to join the military struggle to establish the State of Israel. During a visit to Israel in October 1948, he unofficially joined Yitzhak Sadeh, then commander of Eighth Brigade, and took part in Operation Yoav to conquer the Negev desert. However, when he returned to Israel permanently, his request to join the IDF was denied and he was discharged with the rank of major. This was apparently a result of the pro-Soviet stance that Ben-Gurion attributed to Salomon, as well as most of the other commanders of the Haganah in Europe., even though Salomon was not a member of any political party and was not politically active. Journalist Yochanan Lahav suggested another explanation for his discharge, linking it to Salomon's involvement in the Pan Ships operation, against the will of the Yishuv's leadership, and his efforts to advance a plan supported by Moshe Sneh and Yitzhak Sadeh to bring immigrants to the coast of Mandatory Palestine, even at the cost of conflict with the British

Salomon turned to his private affairs. He established a farm on the land of the former Arab village Sheikh Munis and tried to advance other business initiatives. On the eve of the Sinai Operation (Operation Kadesh) in 1956, he was arrested by Israel's security agency, the Shin Bet, for one night and documents were taken from his home. In this period, the Shin Bet conducted surveillance on members of the opposition parties—this was deemed an infraction on democracy and ceased at the beginning of the 1960s. It seems that Salomon's arrest was ordered after the security service listened in on a conversation between Salomon and his friend Moshe Sneh, who was a Knesset Member for the Mapam Party, due to fears that Salomon's links with senior members of the security establishment would lead to a leak of details concerning the planned military operation. The circumstances of his arrest were discovered by Ehud Avriel, then a Knesset member for Mapai, the ruling party, who complained to the head of the Shin Bet, Amos Manor. This episode came concluded after an investigation was conducted, at Salomon's request, following which the documents were returned to him and he received an apology.

On October 17, 1963, Salomon and his mother, Rachel, died in a road accident. Salomon, 47 at the time of his death, left behind a widow and three children.

== Additional reading ==
- Venia Hadari, Ze'ev, Tsahor Ze'ev, Voyage to freedom: An episode in the illegal immigration to Palestine. London, England & Totowa, N.J.: Vallentine, Mitchell, 1985 ISBN 0-85303-217-3.
