= Tureni =

- Commune
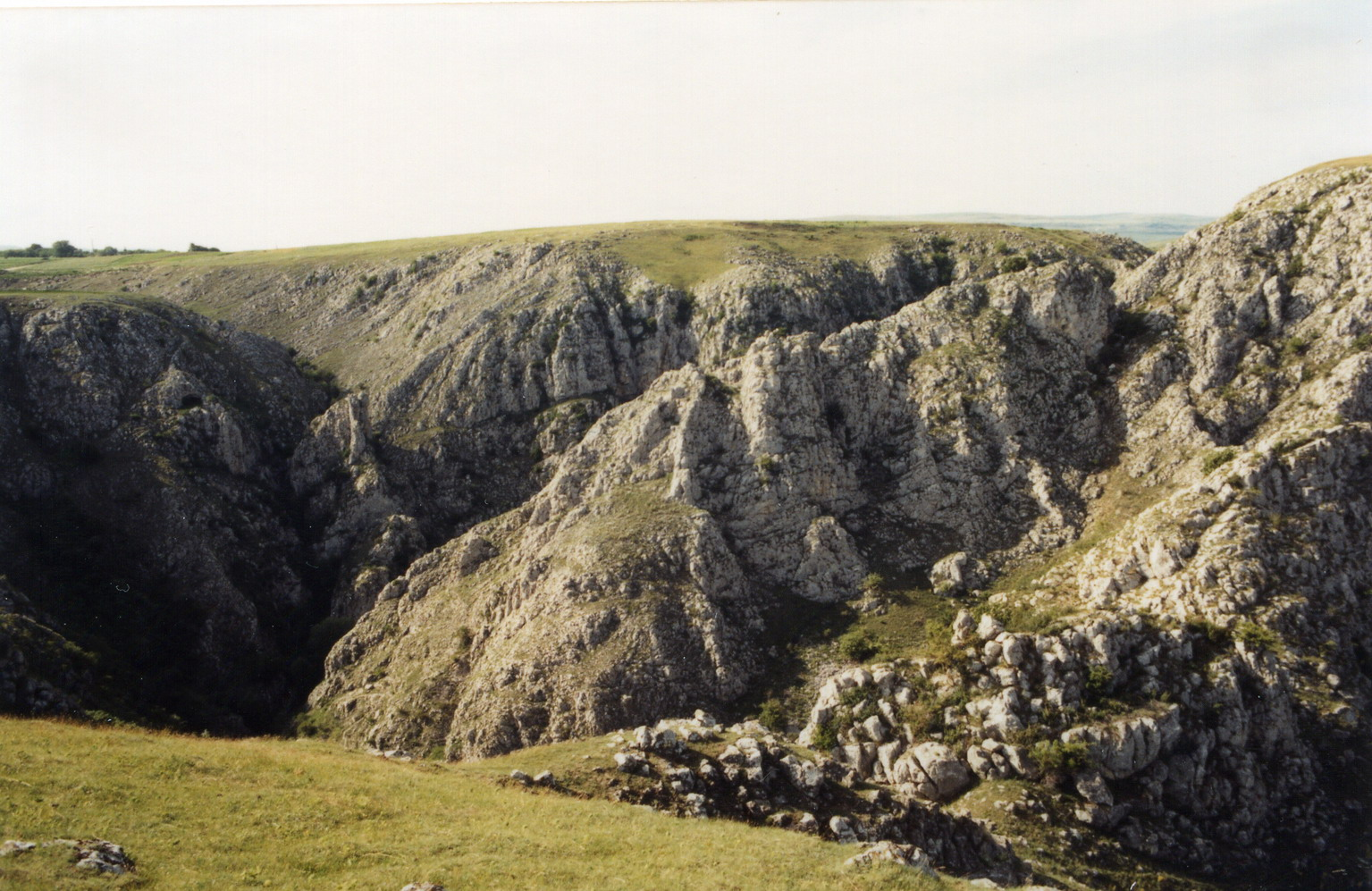
- Cheile Turului

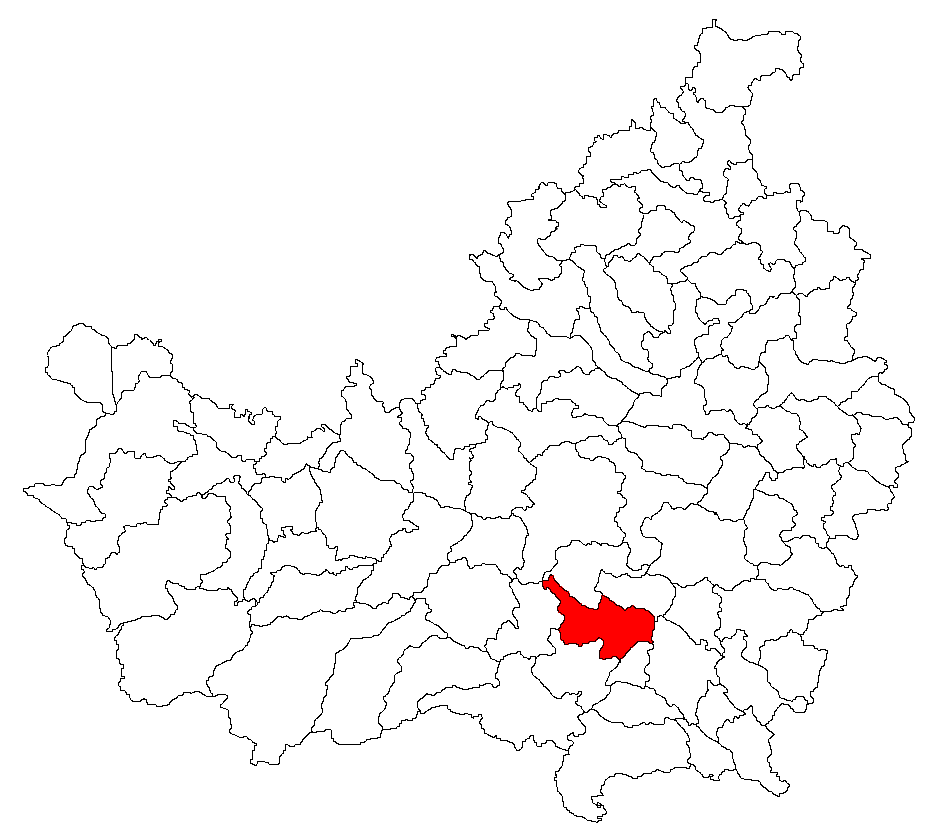
- Location in Cluj County

- Location in Romania
- Coordinates: 46°37′23.16″N 23°42′12.24″E
- Country: Romania
- County: Cluj
- Subdivisions: Ceanu Mic, Comșești, Mărtinești, Micești, Tureni

Government
  - Mayor (2020–2024): Elena Daniela Mănăilă (PNL)
- Area: 74.04 km^{2} (28.59 sq mi)
- Elevation: 541 m (1,775 ft)
- Population (2021-12-01): 2,264
  - Density: 30.58/km^{2} (79.20/sq mi)
- Time zone: UTC+02:00 (EET)
  - Summer (DST): UTC+03:00 (EEST)
- Postal code: 407560
- Area code: +40 x64
- Vehicle reg.: CJ
- Website: comunatureni.ro

Tureni (Hungarian: Tordatúr) is a commune in Cluj County, Transylvania, Romania. It is composed of five villages: Ceanu Mic (Pusztacsán), Comșești (Komjátszeg), Mărtinești (Pusztaszentmárton), Micești (Mikes), and Tureni.

== Geography ==
The commune lies in the northern foothills of the Apuseni Mountains, at an altitude of 541 m (1,775 ft), on the banks of the river Valea Racilor. The Turului Gorge spans a length of 1,850 m (6,070 ft), within a 25 ha (62 acres) protected area of the commune.

Tureni is located in the south-central part of the county, within the Cluj-Napoca metropolitan area, 13 km (8.1 mi) northwest of Turda and 22 km (14 mi) southeast of the county seat, Cluj-Napoca. It is crossed by national road DN1.

== Demographics ==
At the census from 2002, there was a total population of 2,585 people living in this commune; of those, 71.64% were ethnic Romanians, 23.86% ethnic Hungarians, and 4.33% ethnic Roma. At the 2011 census, there were 2,278 inhabitants, including 64.35% Romanians, 24.67% Hungarians, and 7.55% Roma. At the 2021 census, Tureni had a population of 2,264, of which 63.03% were Romanians, 19.66% Hungarians, and 9.81% Roma.

== Natives ==
- Adrian Dohotaru (born 1983), politician
