= Fâneața Vacilor =

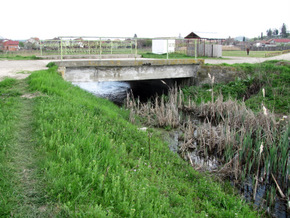
- Bridge near Turda

- Location within Romania

Location
- Country: Romania
- Counties: Cluj County

Physical characteristics
- Mouth: Valea Racilor
  - coordinates: 46.5772°N 23.7815°E
- Length: 13 km (8.1 mi)
- Basin size: 76 km^{2} (29 sq mi)

Basin features
- Progression: Valea Racilor→ Arieș→ Mureș→ Tisza→ Danube→ Black Sea
- Tributaries
  - right: Valea Caldă Mare

The Fâneața Vacilor is a left tributary of the Valea Racilor in Romania. It flows into the Valea Racilor in Turda. Its length is 13 km (8.1 mi) and its basin size is 76 km^{2} (29 sq mi).
