= Adrian Dohotaru =

Romanian politician

Member of the Romanian Parliament for Cluj County
- In office 2016–2020

Personal details
- Born: 20 April 1983 (age 43) Tureni, Cluj County, Romania
- Party: Save Romania Union (to 2017) independent (2017–2022); Green Party (since 2022)
- Occupation: Activist politician

Adrian-Octavian Dohotaru (born 20 April 1983, Micești, Tureni, Cluj, Romania) is a Romanian politician, executive president of Green Party, author and civic environmental activist, deputy of the Cluj constituency between 2016 and 2020.

== Activism ==
He founded the Sustainable Organization S.O.S. through which he advocates for green public spaces, alternative mobility to car traffic, the right to decent housing or participatory budgeting. In 2022, he launched a book on participatory budgeting.

== Politics ==
Adrian Dohotaru, elected in 2016 on the lists of USR Cluj as deputy, resigned from the party in October 2017, one day after the former president of USR, Dan Barna, announced that he wanted USR to position itself in the center-right area. After resigning from USR, he remained independent for almost 4 years. He was elected executive chairman of the Green Party on Saturday 3 September 2022.

== Political position ==
Adrian Dohotaru is described as a leftist, eco-socialist politician.
