= Șoimeni (river) =

- Location within Romania

Location
- Country: Romania
- Counties: Cluj County
- Villages: Băbuțiu, Șoimeni

Physical characteristics
- Mouth: Borșa
  - location: near Vultureni
  - coordinates: 46.9680°N 23.5436°E
- Length: 11 km (6.8 mi)
- Basin size: 36 km^{2} (14 sq mi)

Basin features
- Progression: Borșa→ Someșul Mic→ Someș→ Tisza→ Danube→ Black Sea
- Tributaries
  - right: Buda

The Șoimeni is a right tributary of the river Borșa in Romania. It flows into the Borșa near Vultureni. Its length is 11 km (6.8 mi) and its basin size is 36 km^{2} (14 sq mi).
