= Valea Racilor (Arieș) =

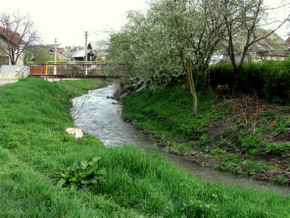

- Location within Romania

Location
- Country: Romania
- Counties: Cluj County
- Villages: Feleacu, Tureni, Turda

Physical characteristics
- Mouth: Arieș
  - coordinates: 46.566°N 23.789°E
- Length: 25 km (16 mi)
- Basin size: 166 km^{2} (64 sq mi)

Basin features
- Progression: Arieș→ Mureș→ Tisza→ Danube→ Black Sea
- Tributaries
  - left: Fâneața Vacilor

The Valea Racilor is a small river in the Apuseni Mountains, Cluj County, western Romania. It is a left tributary of the river Arieș. It flows through the municipalities Feleacu, Tureni and Turda, and joins the Arieș in the town Turda. It is fed by several smaller streams, including the Fâneața Vacilor. Its length is 25 km (16 mi) and its basin size is 166 km^{2} (64 sq mi).
