= Aiton, Cluj =

Aiton
- Commune
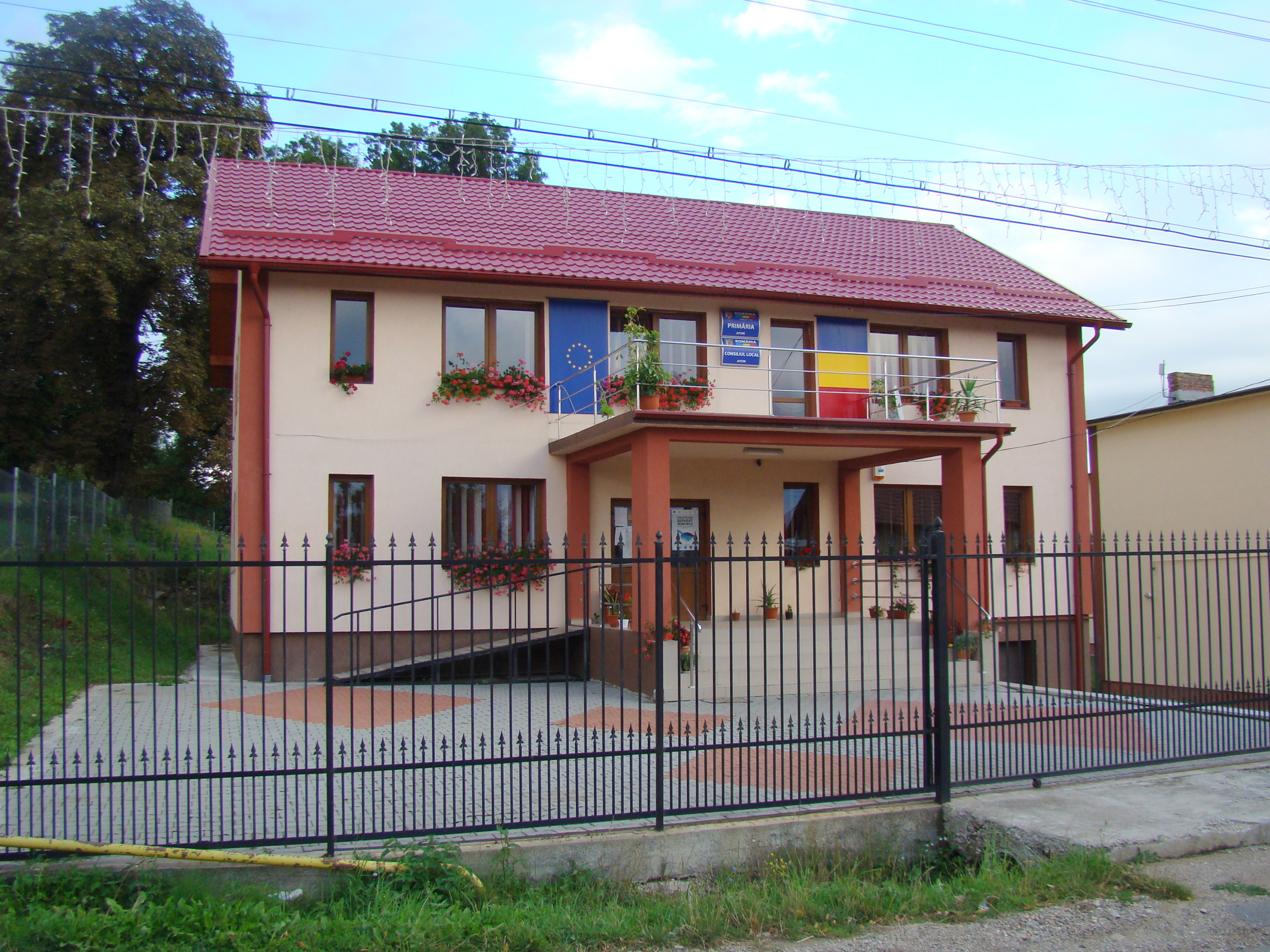
- Aiton town hall

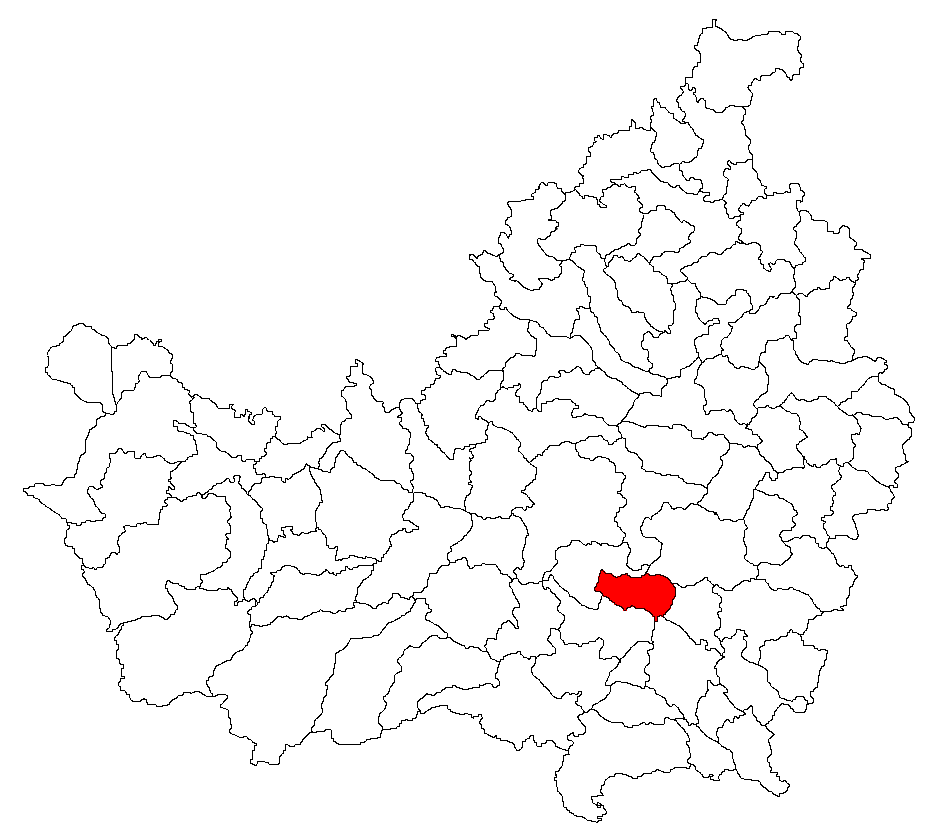
- Location in Cluj County

- Location in Romania
- Coordinates: 46°41′07″N 23°44′20″E
- Country: Romania
- County: Cluj
- Established: 1320
- Subdivisions: Aiton, Rediu

Government
  - Mayor (2020–2024): Nicolae Făgădar (PNL)
- Area: 45.27 km^{2} (17.48 sq mi)
- Population (2021-12-01): 1,061
  - Density: 23.44/km^{2} (60.70/sq mi)
- Time zone: UTC+02:00 (EET)
  - Summer (DST): UTC+03:00 (EEST)
- Postal code: 407025
- Area code: +40 x64
- Vehicle reg.: CJ
- Website: primariaaiton.ro

Aiton (Hungarian: Ajton; German: Eiten) is a commune in Cluj County, Transylvania, Romania. It is composed of two villages, Aiton and Rediu (Rőd).

== Geography ==
The commune is situated in the northern foothills of the Apuseni Mountains, at a mean altitude ov 626 m (2,054 ft). The presence of large deposits of halite and saltwater springs within the perimeter of the commune have been identified.

Located in the central part of Cluj County, Aiton belongs to the Cluj-Napoca metropolitan area.

== History ==
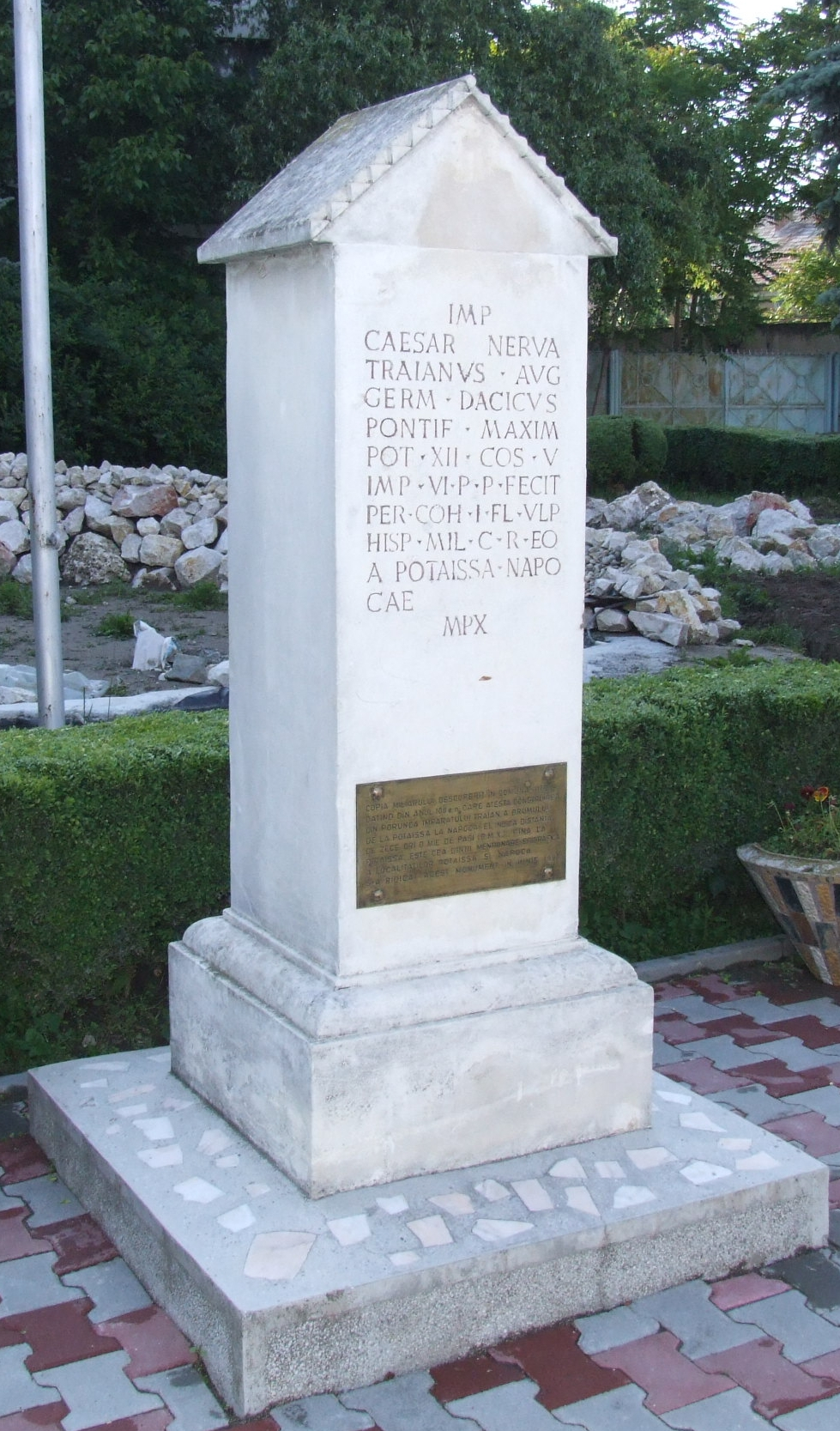
A copy of the Milliarium of Aiton erected in June 1993 in front of the Turda Post Office

Traces of several ancient neolithic settlements (of which Vinča culture from the 4th millennium BC), as well as evidence indicative of the Bronze Age, the Iron Age, the Roman conquest, and the Migration Period, were discovered in the village. Within the surrounding area, a tomb of incineration from the 1st century BC and a rustic villa have also been found; the latter in which a Dacian fruit tree from the 2nd century BC has been discovered.

During the Roman period, the locality was situated on the Roman road of Potaissa-Napoca. Initially, a portion of the commune was left uncovered in the yard adjacent to the school, marked by a colonette reproducing the inscription on the milestone of 108. As of 2017, however, the site is covered in waste products. The area was historically the center of a Spanish equestrian unit.

The first documented reference to the village of Aiton with the name Villa Ohthunth dates back to 1320, and in 1329, the toponym of Ahthon was attributed to the settlement. Since 1456, it appears under the current name of Ayton. In 1658, the locality was burned, following a Turkish and Tatar invasion.

In the 18th century, a milestone named Aiton Biliar from the Roman period was discovered. This marked a distance on the Potaissa-Napoca. The landmark attests the existence of a road built in 108 AD by the Cohors I Hispanorum Miliaria. A copy of this landmark is displayed in Turda, yet another is displayed in front of the school of Aiton.

On the Josephine Map of Transylvania from 1769 to 1773 (section 095), Aiton appears under the name of Ajton. The northern and southeastern parts of the village are marked by "Gericht" and by the sign of two public places of punishment of the delinquents in the medieval period.

=== Historical monuments ===
The following objectives of the village of Aiton were included on the list of historical monuments in Cluj County, elaborated further by the Ministry of Culture and Religious Affairs in 2010.

- The archaeological site from "Suri" (LMI code)
- The archaeological site of "Above the Morrow" (LMI code)
- The archaeological site of the section "Between creeks" (LMI code)
- The vestiges of the Napoca-Potaissa road (LMI code)
- The wooden church (LMI code)
- Reformed Calvinist Church (LMI code)
- The "Sandor Manor" in the village of Aiton is included in the "List of Delisted Historical Monuments", as described by the Ministry of Culture and Religious Affairs in 2010.

== Places of worship ==
- The Reformed Calvinist Church from 1598 (Main Street no. 161), with the Romanesque western portal. The church is inscribed on the list of historical monuments in Cluj County (2010).
- The Orthodox Wooden Church from 1711. The church is inscribed on the list of historical monuments in Cluj County (2010).
- The Wooden Church of Aiton.

== Tourist attractions ==
Among the main tourist attractions and points of interest in the area are as follows:

- The museum with objects from the Roman period (demolished in the meantime).
- The reservation of "Ciolt Forest".

== Economy ==
The predominant occupations of residents involve agriculture and the breeding of livestock.

== Demographics ==
=== Ethnic demographics of population ===
Census		Ethnicity
Year	Population	Romanians	Hungarians	Germans	Roma	Other minorities
1850	2,438	1,901	443		85	9
1880	2,803	2,106	585	1		111
1890	3,452	2,690	720			42
1900	3,528	2,830	698			0
1910	3,934	3,183	693	4		54
1920	3,747	3,178	551			18
1930	4,132	3,504	586	1	28	13
1941	4,585	3,975	566	2		42
1956	3,754	3,274	479			1
1966	3,308	2,840	467	1		0
1977	2,772	2,404	368			0
1992	1,626	1,432	194			0
1992	1,626	1,431	195			0
2002	1,338	1,154	181		3	0
2011	1,085	898	126		12
2021	1,061	766	173

=== Religious demographics of population ===
Census		Religion
Year	Population	Orthodox	Greek Catholics	Roman Catholics	Calvinist	Other minorities
1850	2,438	-	879	13	406	3
1880	2,803	-	1,657	18	558	13
1890	3,452	-	1,346	16	635	47
1900	3,528	-	1,346	24	601	32
1910	3,934	-	1,508	18	635	23
1920	3,747
1930	4,132	12	1,707	7	558
1941	4,585
1956	3,754
1966	3,308
1977	2,772
1992	1,626	545	82	-	545	32
2002	1,338	180	352	-	139	36
2011	1,085	622	257	17	111	24
2021	1,061	604	105	32	148	17

The numerical jump in favor of the Orthodox Church between 1930 and 1992 can be explained by the prohibition of the Greek Catholic Church in 1948 by the Communist government.

== Gallery ==
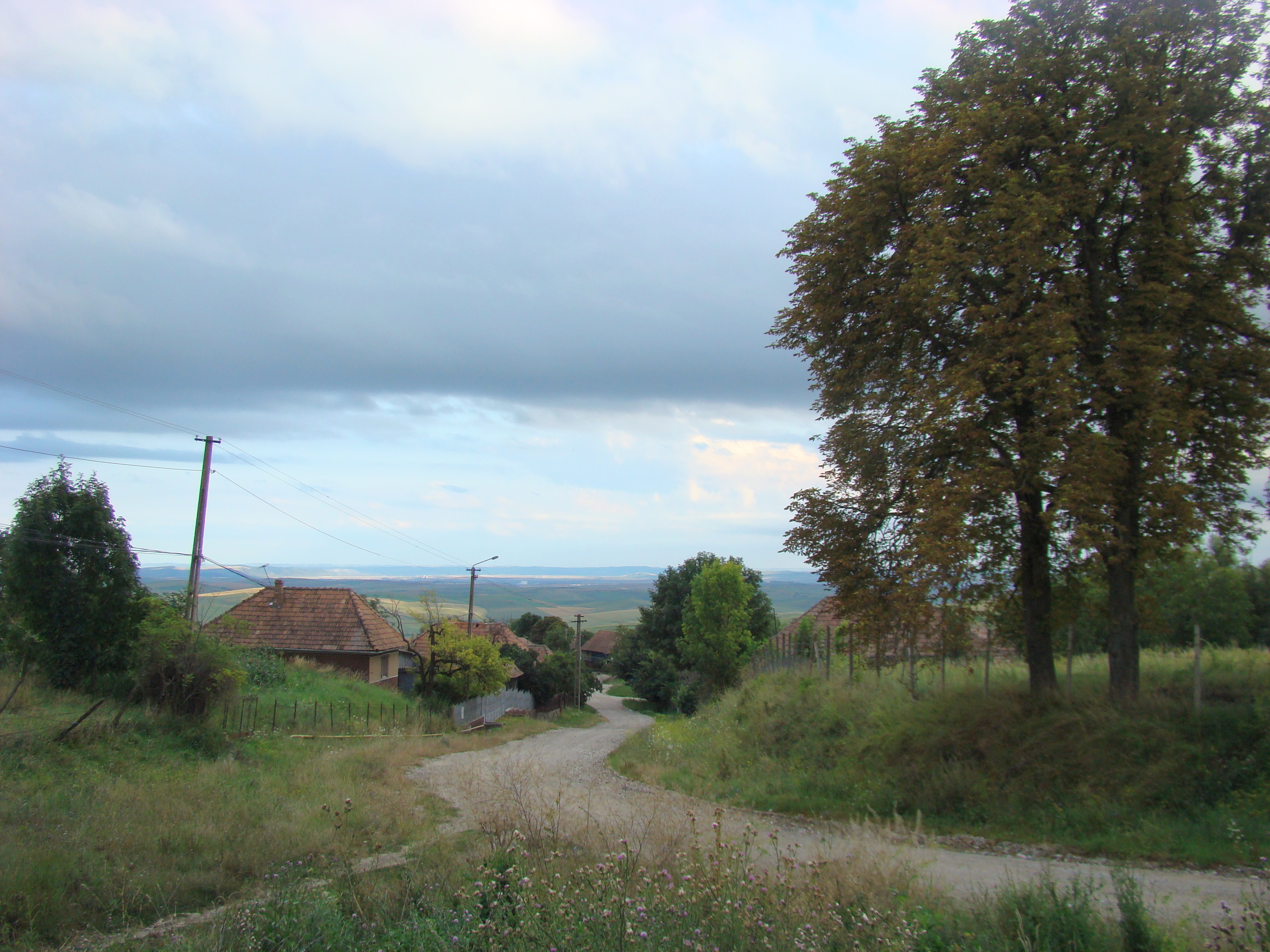
Aiton

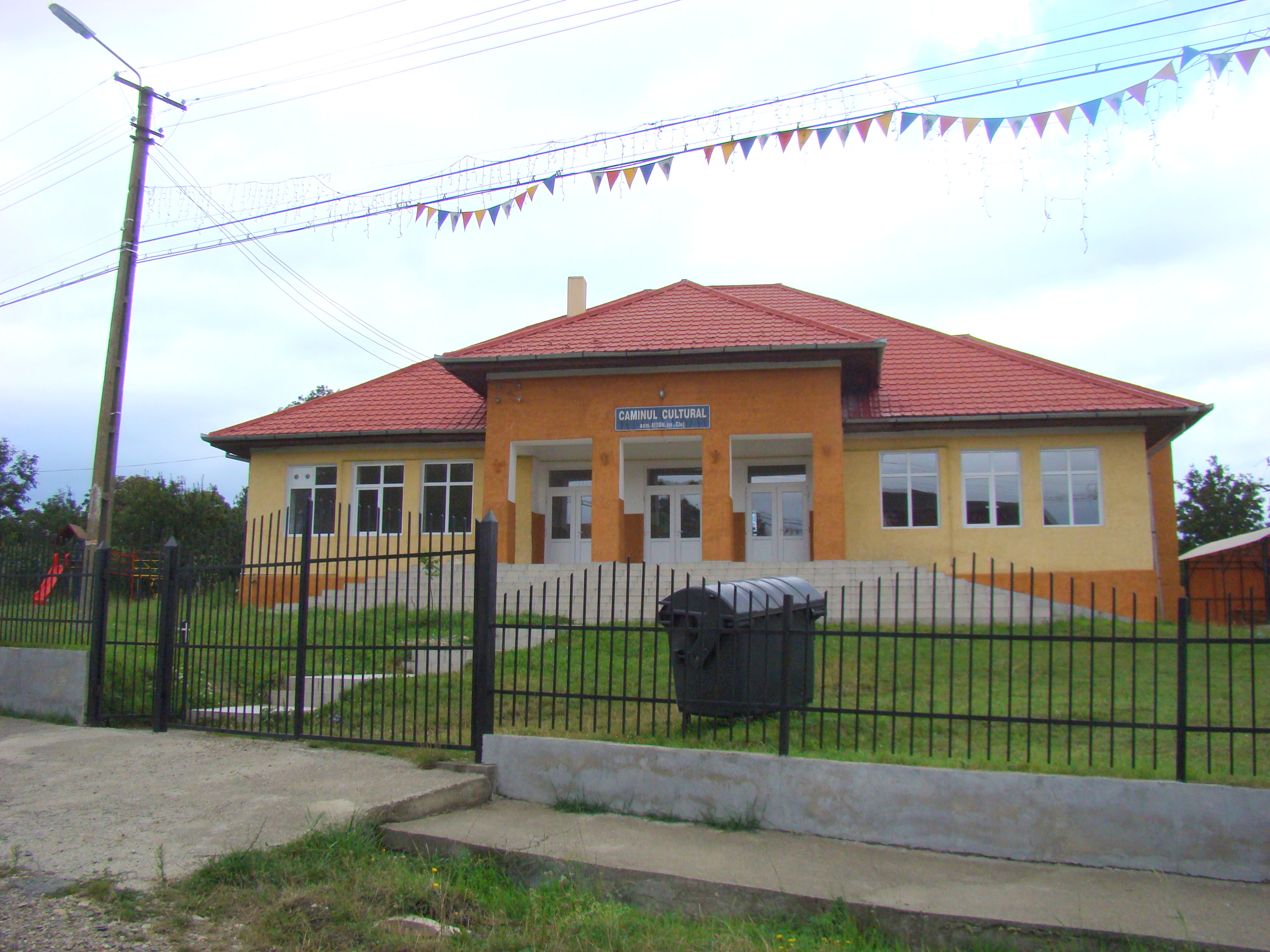
Community center

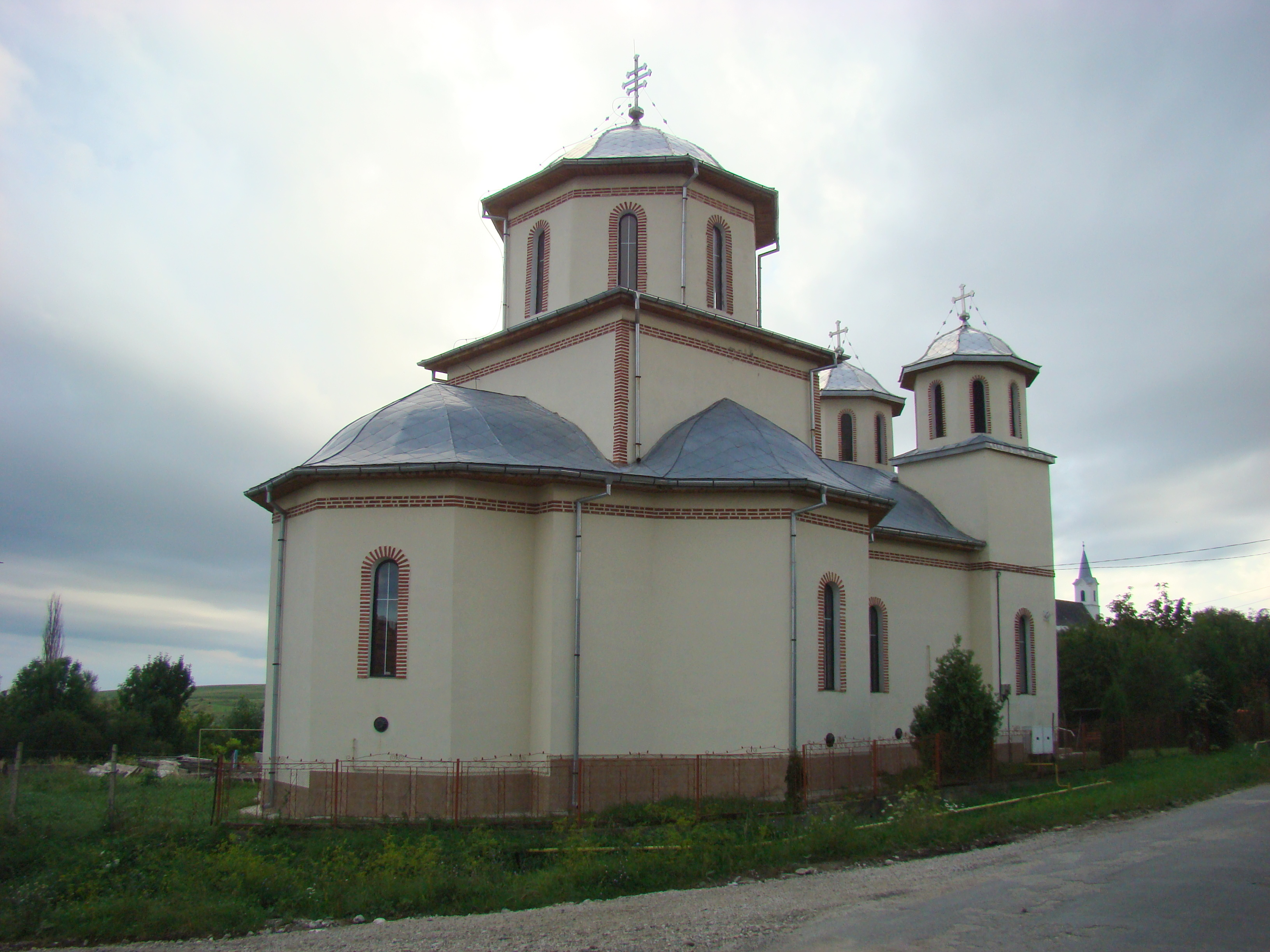
Orthodox church

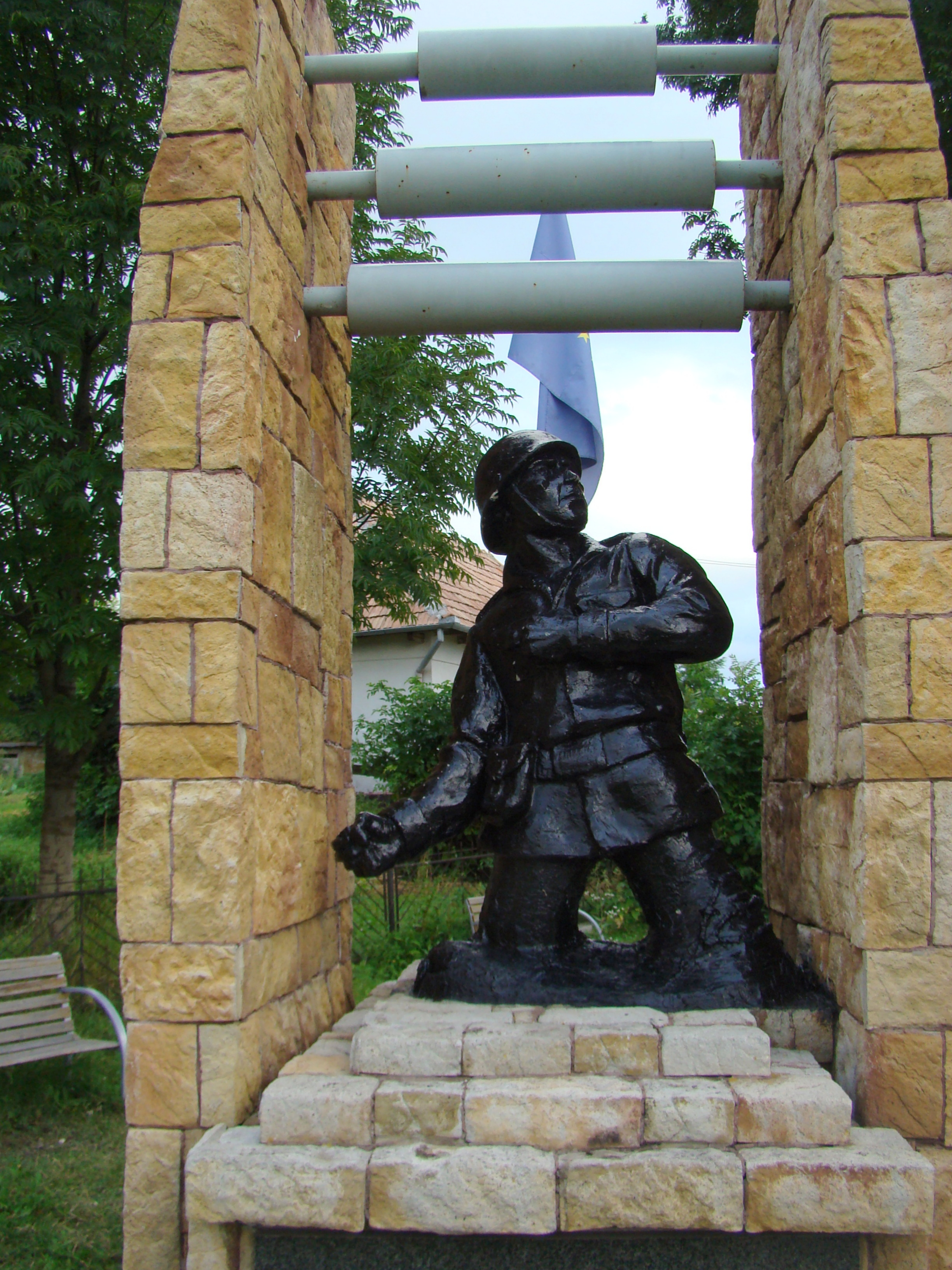
Heroes monument (detail)

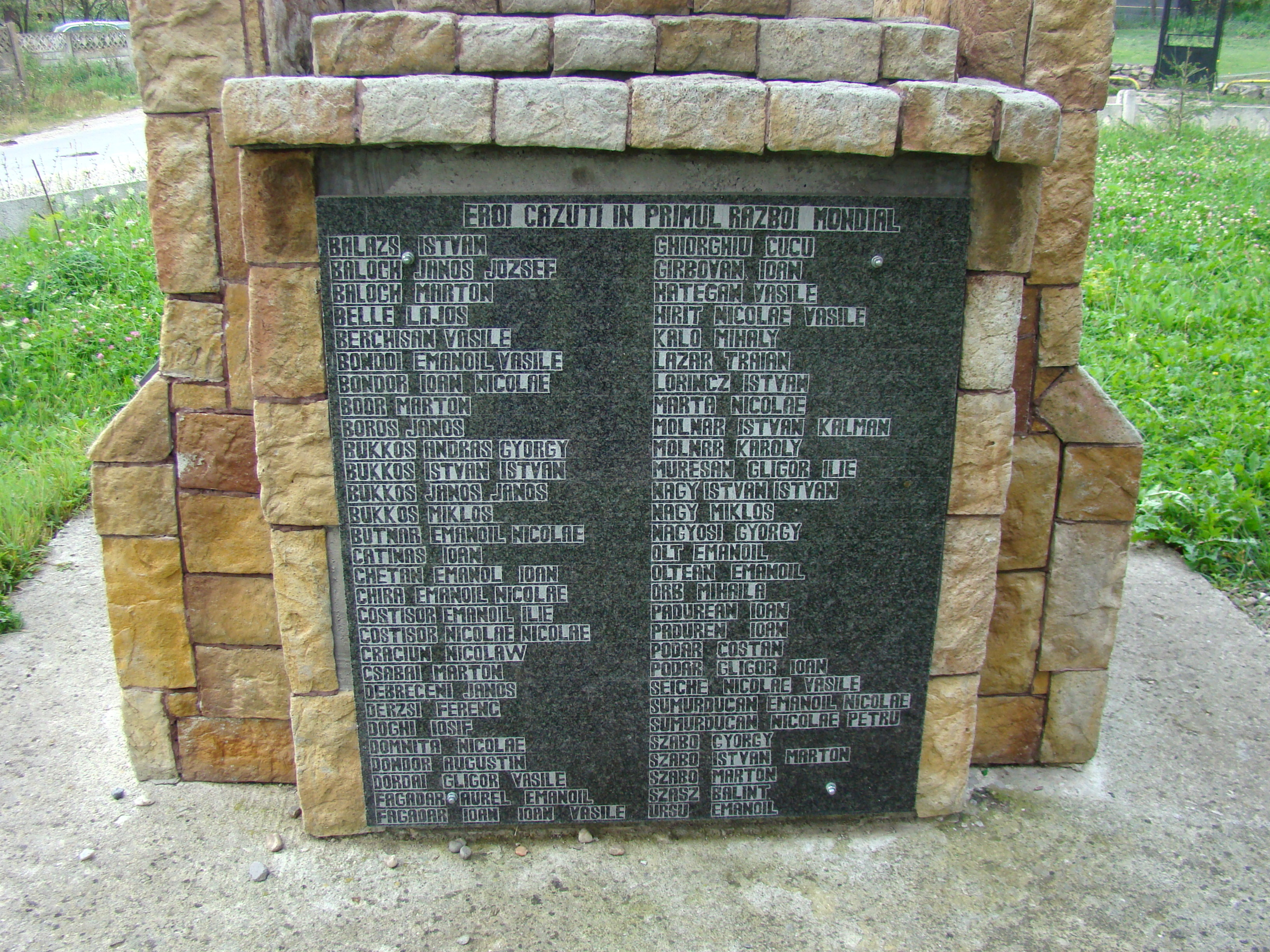
Heroes monument (detail)

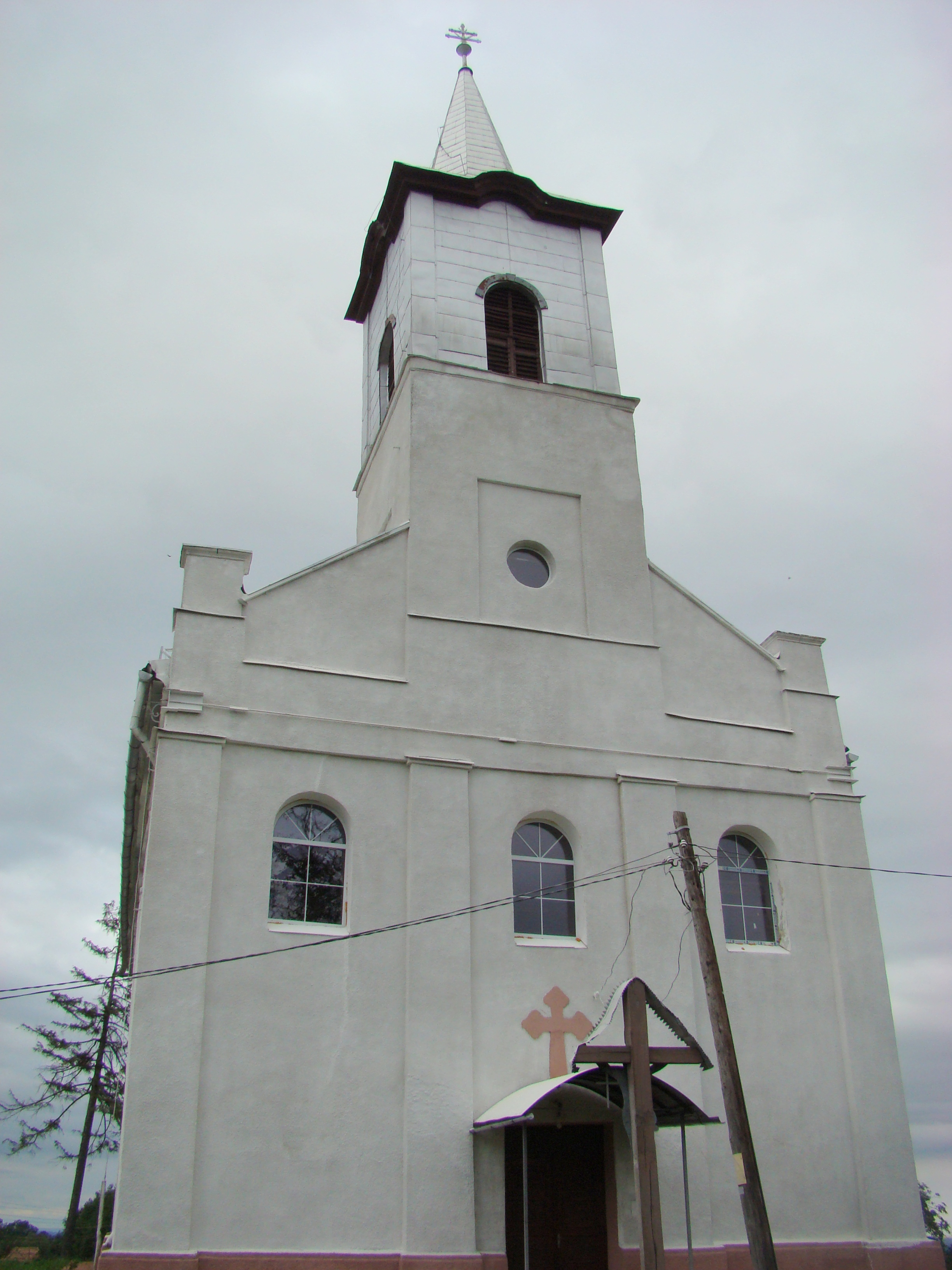
Greek Catholic Church
