= Vultureni, Cluj =

Vultureni
- Commune
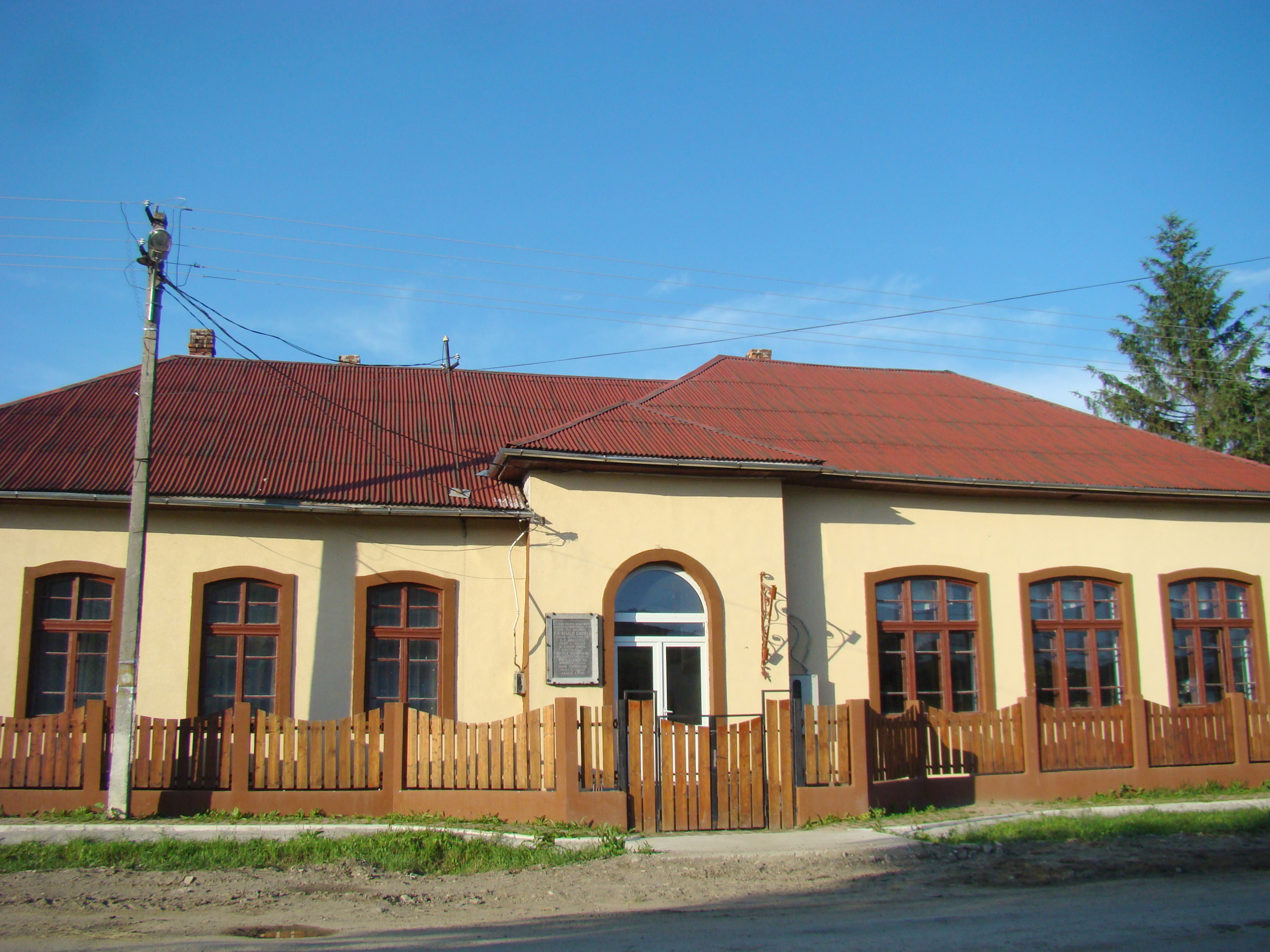
- Vultureni townhall

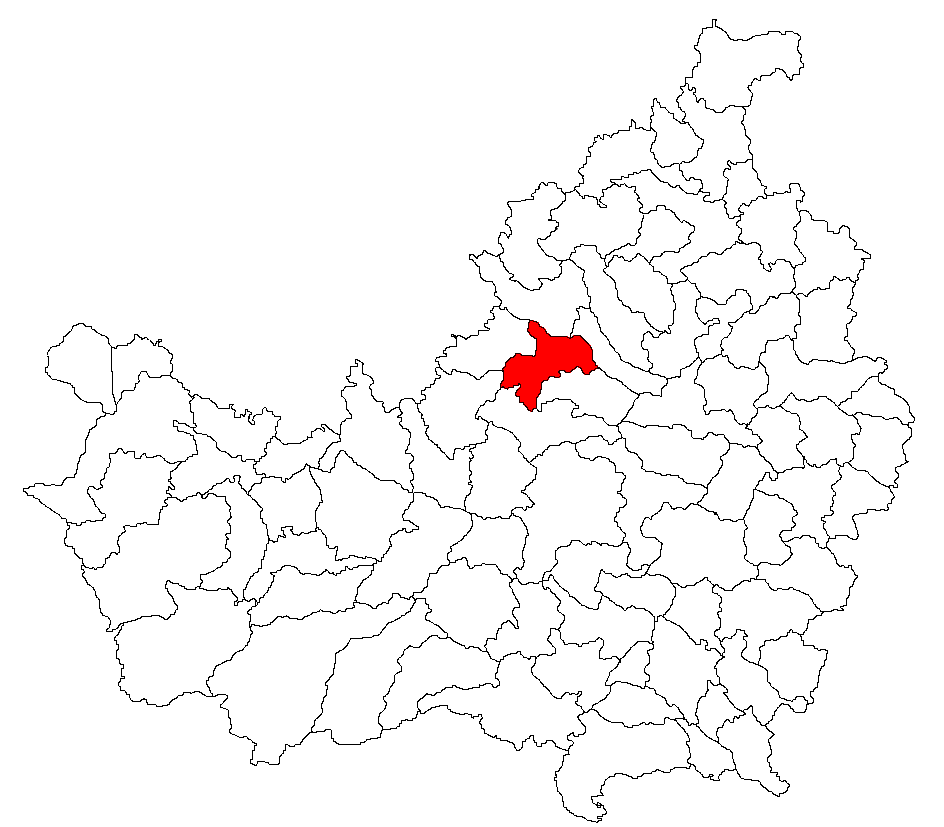
- Location in Cluj County

- Location in Romania
- Coordinates: 46°57′52.56″N 23°33′26.64″E
- Country: Romania
- County: Cluj
- Subdivisions: Băbuțiu, Bădești, Chidea, Făureni, Șoimeni, Vultureni

Government
  - Mayor (2020–2024): Eugen Mureșan (PNL)
- Area: 71.12 km^{2} (27.46 sq mi)
- Elevation: 376 m (1,234 ft)
- Population (2021-12-01): 1,535
  - Density: 21.58/km^{2} (55.90/sq mi)
- Time zone: UTC+02:00 (EET)
  - Summer (DST): UTC+03:00 (EEST)
- Postal code: 407595
- Area code: (+40) 02 64
- Vehicle reg.: CJ
- Website: www.comunavultureni.ro

Vultureni (Hungarian: Borsaújfalu) is a commune in Cluj County, Transylvania, Romania. It is composed of six villages: Băbuțiu (Báboc), Bădești (Bádok), Chidea (Kide), Făureni (Kolozskovácsi), Șoimeni (Sólyomkő), and Vultureni.

== Geography ==
The commune is located in the central-north part of the county, 30 km (19 mi) from the county seat, Cluj-Napoca. It lies on the banks of the river Borșa and its right tributary, the river Șoimeni.

== Demographics ==
According to the census from 2002 there was a total population of 1,568 people living in this commune; of those, 84.69% were ethnic Romanians, 11.73% ethnic Hungarians, and 3.50% ethnic Roma. At the 2011 census, Vultureni had a population of 1,516, of which 80.28% were Romanians, 10.95% Hungarians, and 6% Roma. At the 2021 census, the commune had 1,535 inhabitants; of those, 78.18% were Romanians, 7.04% Hungarians, and 6.12% Roma.

== Natives ==
- András Kovács (1925–2017), Hungarian film director and screenwriter
- Jacob Salomon (1916–1963), member of the Haganah and Palmach
