= Așchileu =

- Commune
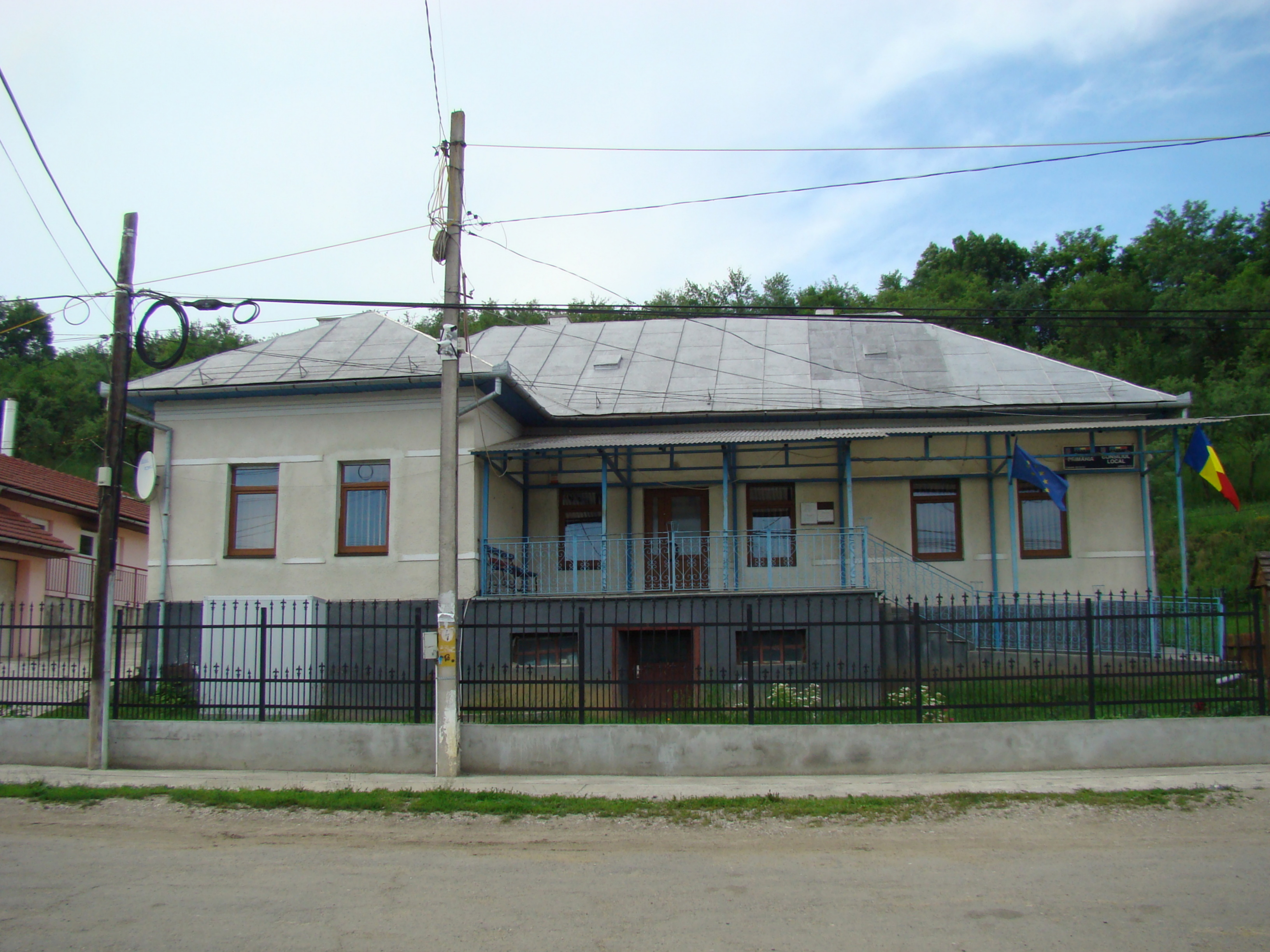
- Așchileu town hall

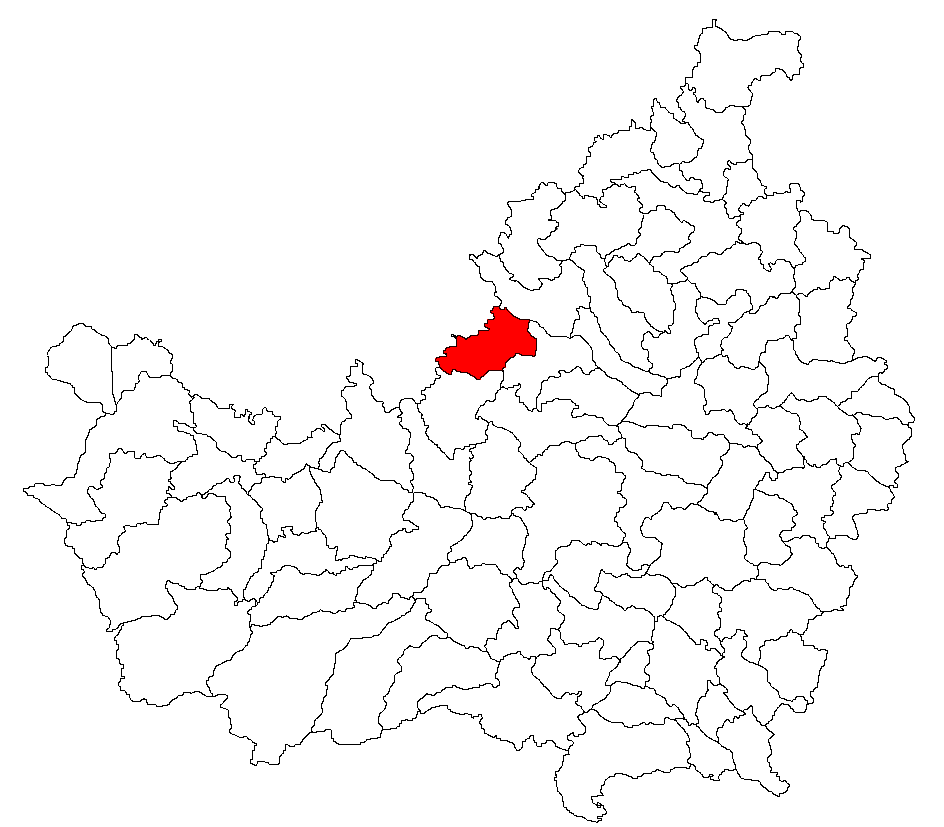
- Location in Cluj County

- Location in Romania
- Coordinates: 46°59′00″N 23°29′03″E
- Country: Romania
- County: Cluj
- Established: 1320
- Subdivisions: Așchileu Mare, Așchileu Mic, Cristorel, Dorna, Fodora

Government
  - Mayor (2020–2024): Ana Cighir (PNL)
- Area: 65.12 km^{2} (25.14 sq mi)
- Elevation: 400 m (1,300 ft)
- Population (2021-12-01): 1,397
  - Density: 21.45/km^{2} (55.56/sq mi)
- Time zone: UTC+02:00 (EET)
  - Summer (DST): UTC+03:00 (EEST)
- Postal code: 407046
- Area code: +40 x64
- Vehicle reg.: CJ
- Website: comunaaschileu.ro

Așchileu (Hungarian: Esküllő; German: Gross-Schwalbendorf) is a commune in Cluj County, Transylvania, Romania. It is composed of five villages: Așchileu Mare (the commune center; Nagyesküllő), Așchileu Mic (Kisesküllő), Cristorel (Ördögkeresztúr), Dorna (Dorna), and Fodora (Magyarfodorháza).

After the death of Gelou, the peace between the Romanians and Tuhum, the leader of the Hungarian invaders in the 10th century, was arranged at Așchileu.

== Demographics ==
Historical population
Year	Pop.	±%
1850	2,296	—
1880	2,377	+3.5%
1890	2,561	+7.7%
1900	2,695	+5.2%
1910	3,043	+12.9%
1920	2,910	−4.4%
1930	3,299	+13.4%
1941	3,620	+9.7%
1956	3,863	+6.7%
1966	3,431	−11.2%
1977	3,081	−10.2%
1992	1,952	−36.6%
2002	1,841	−5.7%
2011	1,601	−13.0%
2021	1,397	−12.7%
Source: Census data

According to the 2002 census, the commune had 1,841 inhabitants; Romanians made up 83.7% of the population, Hungarians made up 10.86%, and Roma made up 5.43%. At the 2021 census, Așchileu had a population of 1,397; of those, 76.16% were Romanians and 5.8% Hungarians.

== Notes ==
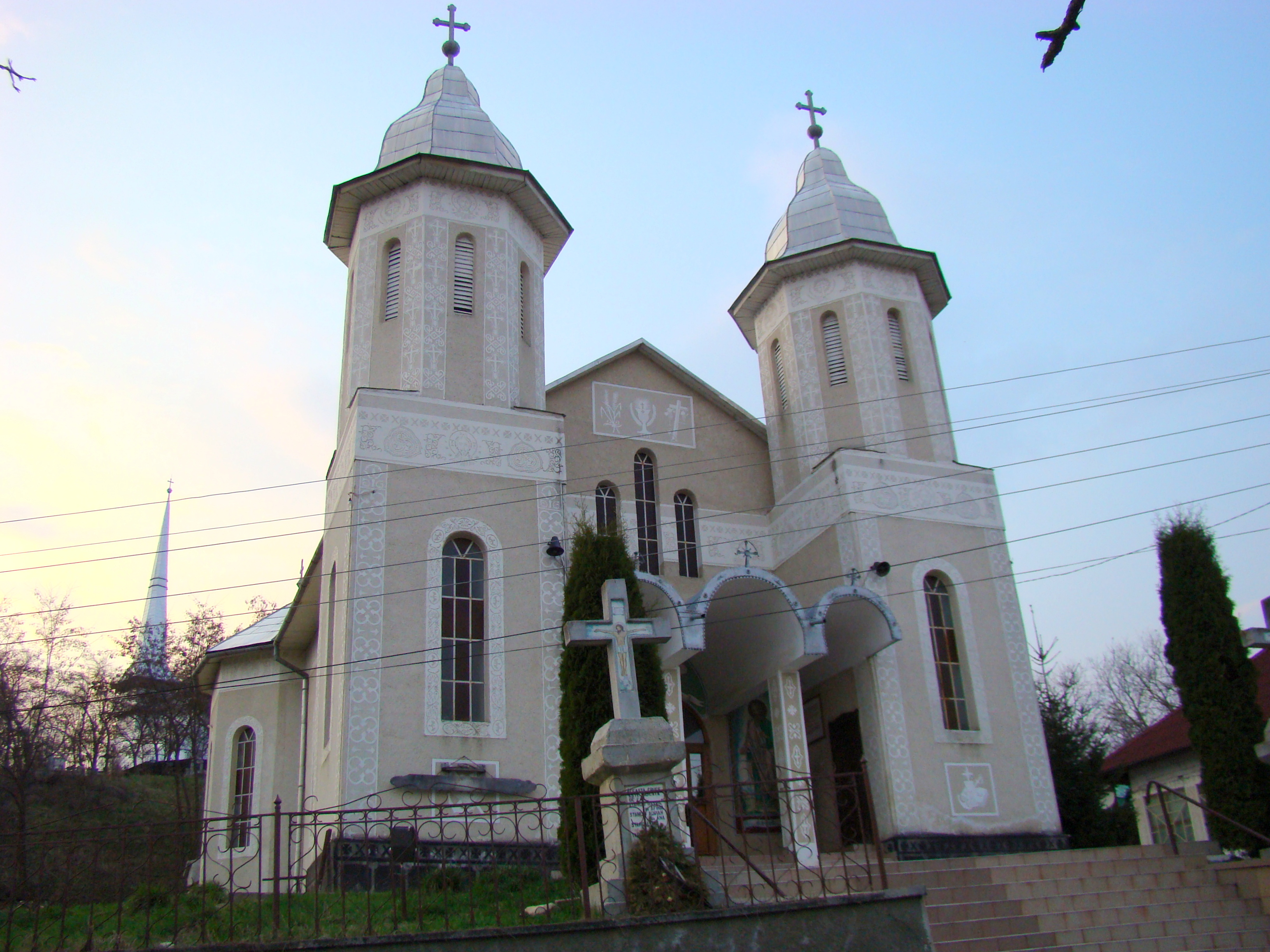
Orthodox church in Așchileu Mare

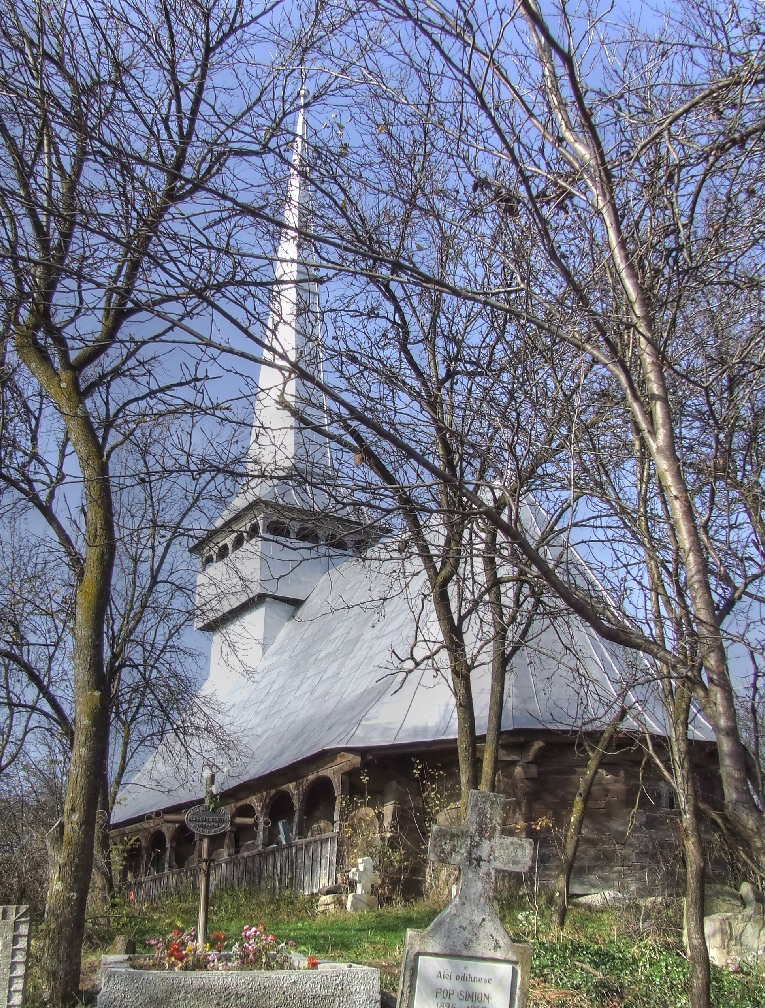
Wooden church in Așchileu Mare

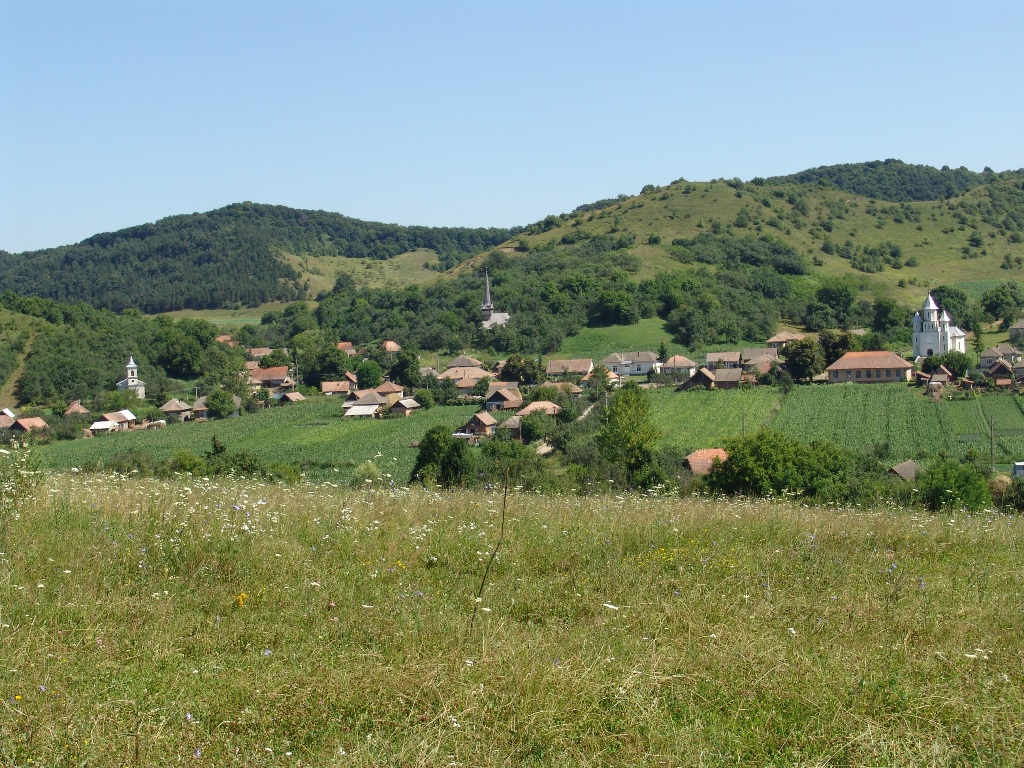
Așchileu Mic

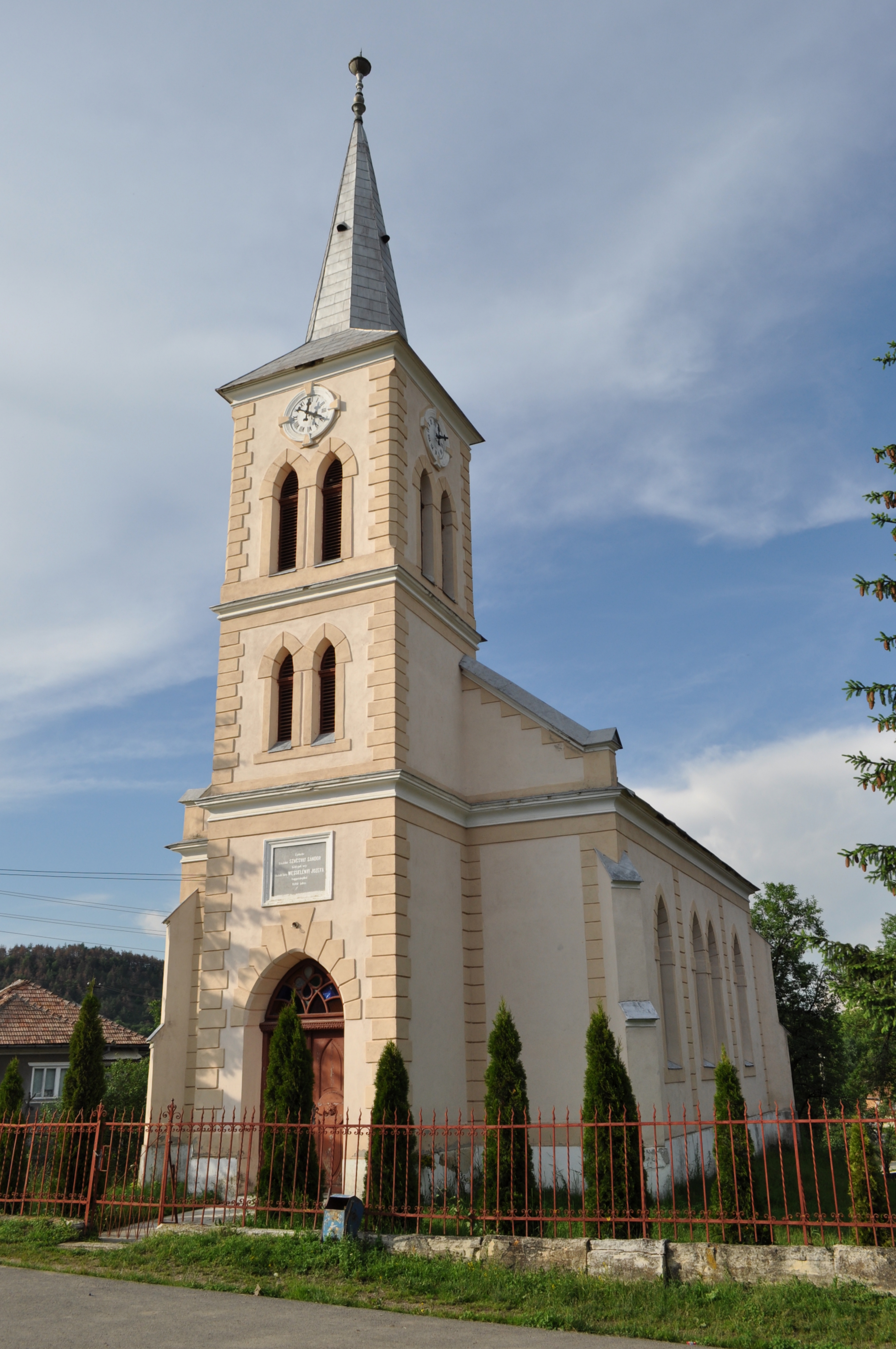
Reformed church in Cristorel
