= Borșa, Cluj =

Borșa
- Commune
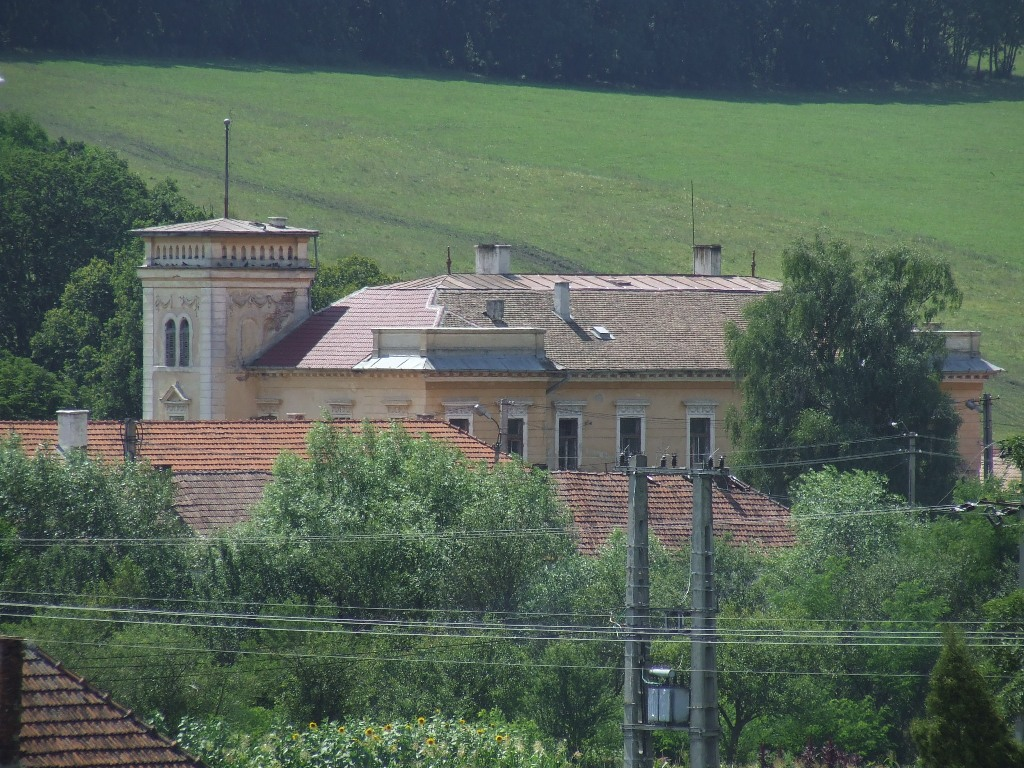
- The Bánffy castle

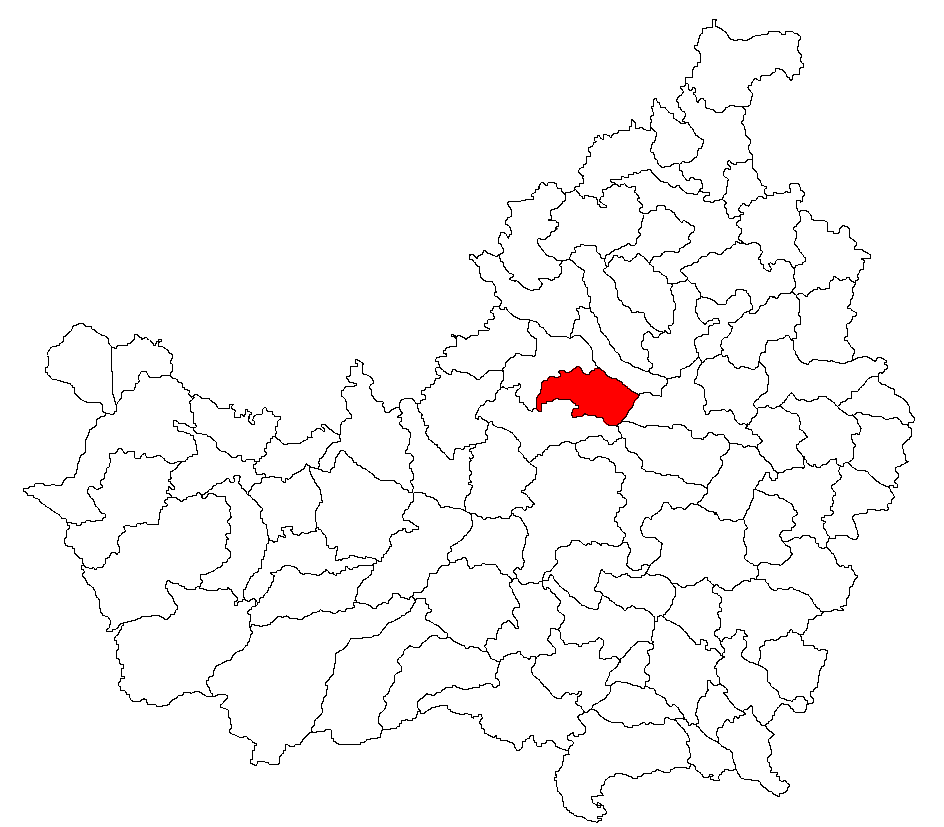
- Location in Cluj County

- Location in Romania
- Coordinates: 46°56′00″N 23°39′40″E
- Country: Romania
- County: Cluj
- Established: 1315
- Subdivisions: Borșa, Borșa-Cătun, Borșa-Crestaia, Ciumăfaia, Giula

Government
  - Mayor (2020–2024): Mariana Secara (PNL)
- Area: 61.62 km^{2} (23.79 sq mi)
- Elevation: 328 m (1,076 ft)
- Population (2021-12-01): 1,511
  - Density: 24.52/km^{2} (63.51/sq mi)
- Time zone: UTC+02:00 (EET)
  - Summer (DST): UTC+03:00 (EEST)
- Postal code: 407110
- Area code: +(40) x64
- Vehicle reg.: CJ
- Website: www.primariaborsa.ro

Borșa (Hungarian: Kolozsborsa; German: Borschen) is a commune in Cluj County, Transylvania, Romania. It is composed of five villages: Borșa, Borșa-Cătun (Bánffytanya), Borșa-Crestaia, Ciumăfaia (Csomafája), and Giula (Kolozsgyula).

== Demographics ==
According to the census from 2002 there was a total population of 1,865 people living in this commune, of which 88.47% were ethnic Romanians, 8.79% Hungarians, and 2.68% Roma. At the 2021 census, Borșa had a population of 1,511; of those, 85.11% were Romanians, 4.9% Hungarians, and 3.11% Roma.

== Natives ==
- Ion Horațiu Crișan (1928–1994), historian and archaeologist
