= Întregalde =

- Commune
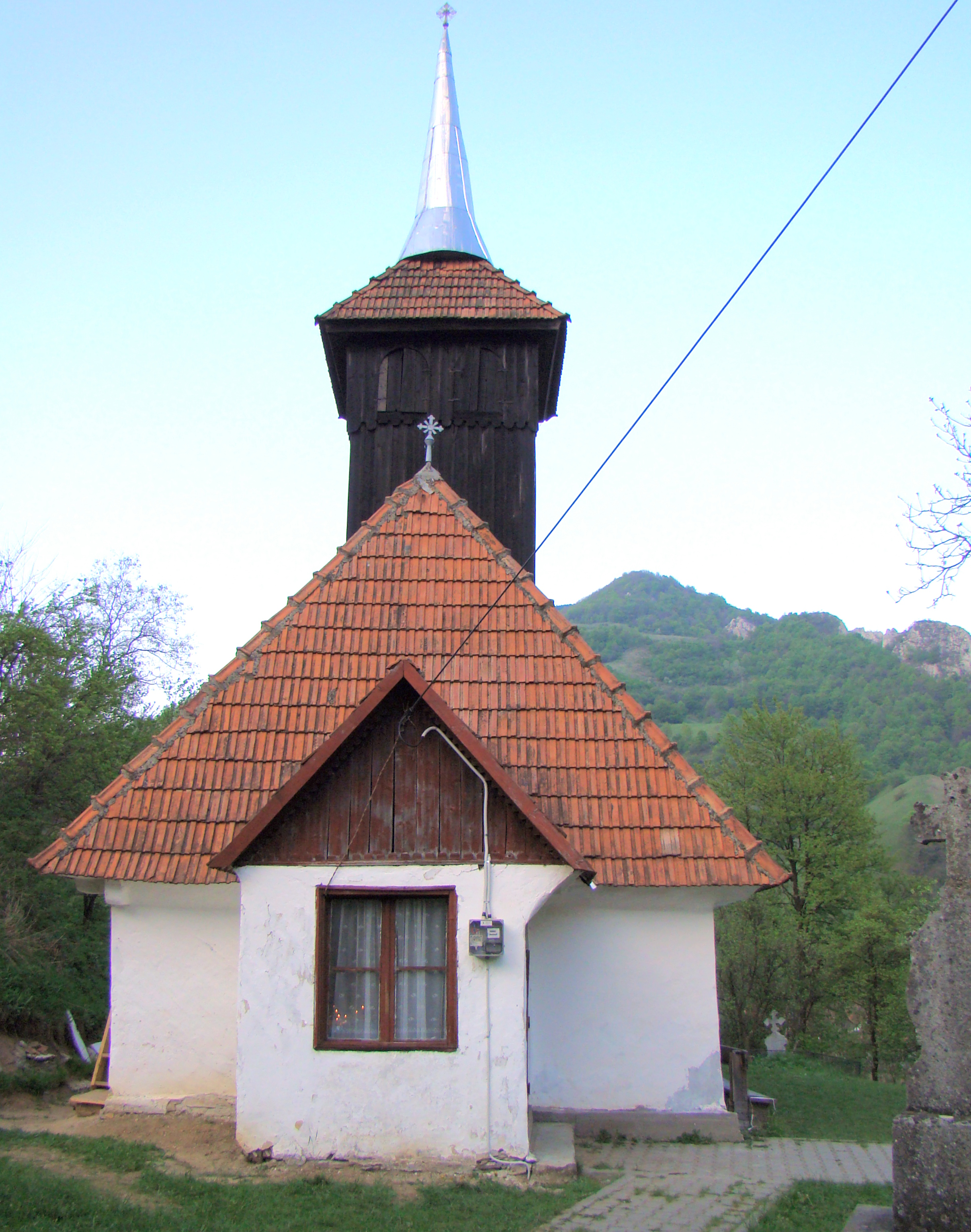
- Church of St. Elijah, Întregalde

- Coat of arms

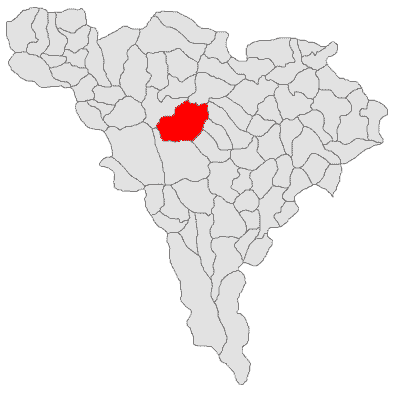
- Location in Alba County

- Location in Romania
- Coordinates: 46°14′31″N 23°24′32″E
- Country: Romania
- County: Alba

Government
  - Mayor (2020–2024): Victoria Moga (Ind.)
- Area: 82.86 km^{2} (31.99 sq mi)
- Elevation: 825 m (2,707 ft)
- Highest elevation: 900 m (3,000 ft)
- Lowest elevation: 600 m (2,000 ft)
- Population (2021-12-01): 459
  - Density: 5.54/km^{2} (14.3/sq mi)
- Time zone: UTC+02:00 (EET)
  - Summer (DST): UTC+03:00 (EEST)
- Postal code: 517365
- Vehicle reg.: AB
- Website: comunaintregalde.ro

Întregalde (German: Koliben; Hungarian: Havasgáld) is a commune located in Alba County, Transylvania, Romania. It is composed of eleven villages: Dealu Geoagiului (Havasgyógy), Ghioncani, Iliești, Întregalde, Ivăniș, Mărinești, Modolești, Necrilești (Nekrilesti), Popești (Popesti), Sfârcea (Szfirecsea) and Tecșești (Teksesty).

== Geography ==
Întregalde is located in the north-central part of the county, 28 km (17 mi) west of Teiuș and 38 km (24 mi) northwest of the county seat, Alba Iulia. It lies at the foot of the Trascău Mountains, in the Apuseni mountain range. Situated at an altitude that varies from 600 m (2,000 ft) to 900 m (3,000 ft), it is dominated by Capra Peak (1,211 m (3,973 ft)), Piatra Cetii Peak (1,234 m (4,049 ft)), and Piatra Craivii Peak (1,078 m (3,537 ft)). The area is full of wild animals, including wolves, brown bears, and wild boars.

The river Galda flows through the villages of Ghioncani and Ivăniș. Its right tributary, the Găldița, flows through Sfârcea and Necrilești, joining the Galda 1 km (0.62 mi) from the center of Întregalde, while its left tributary, the Ghilcer, flows through Modolești.

The commune has the following neighbors: to the northwest, Mogoș commune; to the north, Râmeț commune; to the east, Stremț and Galda de Jos communes; to the southeast, Ighiu commune; to the south, Meteș commune; and to the southwest, the town of Zlatna. Întregalde is traversed by county road DJ107K, which runs from Mogoș to Galda de Jos, where it connects to European route E81.

== History ==
The locality was first attested in 1525, under the name of Galda Românească, during the time when the Voivode of Transylvania was John Zápolya, who in 1526 became King of Hungary. The oldest village is Dealu Geoagiului, documented since 1413, as Alter Gyor Valaharis, or the Other Romanian Geoagiu.

The name Întregalde (literally, "In Between the Galdas") is said to come from the fact that the first houses were built near the confluence of the two rivers running through town, Galda and Găldița (or, "Little Galda").

== Demographics ==
Historical population
Year	Pop.	±%
1941	2,385	—
2002	877	−63.2%
2011	577	−34.2%
2021	459	−20.5%
Source: INS, Census data

At the census from 2011 there was a total population of 577 people living in this commune (down from 2,385 in 1941 and 877 in 2002), of which 94.8% were ethnic Romanians. Furthermore, 92.2% were Orthodox and 1.39% were Seventh-day Adventists.

In recent years, the population of the commune has been declining and aging, with an average age of about 60. Some 60 inhabitants work outside the country. As of 2012, one of the villages, Mărinești, had a single dweller, a man in his 80s.

At the 2021 census, Întregalde's population further declined, to 459.

== Tourist attractions ==
- The wooden church of Dealu Geoagiului (from 1742)
- The wooden church of Întregalde (from 1774)
- The Bisericuța cave, in Sfârcea
- The Piatra Cetii nature reserve and the Piatra Cetii pit cave
- The Găldiței and Turcului Gorges, on the road between Întregalde and Necrilești villages
- The Tecșești Gorges, along the Cetii Valley, on the road to Stremț
- The daffodil meadows from Tecșești
