= Stremț =

- Commune
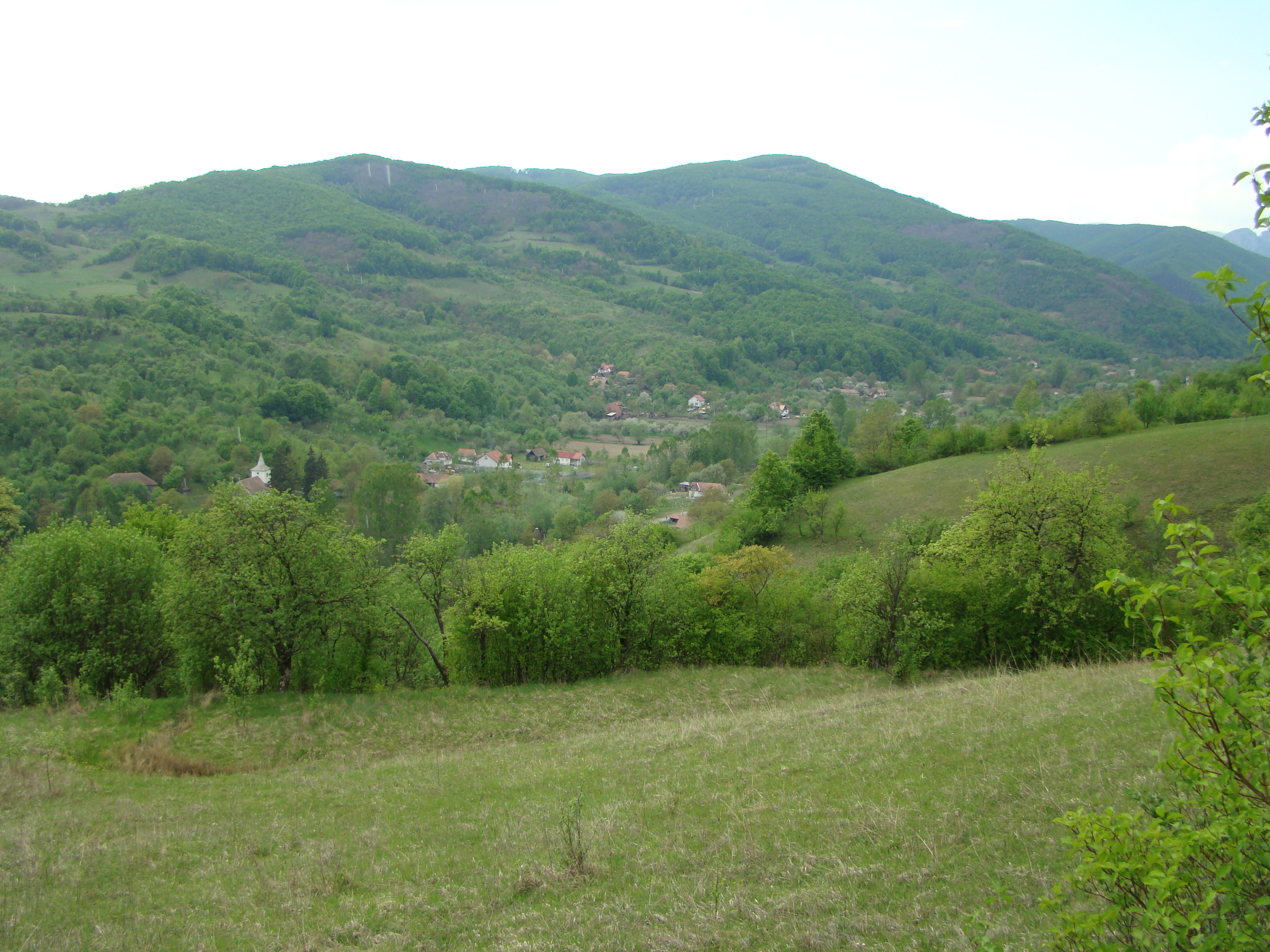
- Geoagiu de Sus village

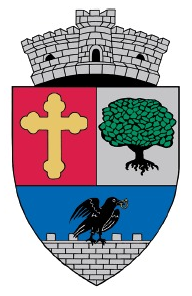
- Coat of arms

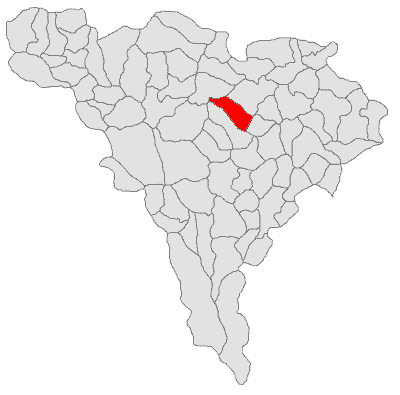
- Location in Alba County

- Location in Romania
- Coordinates: 46°13′20.2″N 23°38′20.5″E
- Country: Romania
- County: Alba
- Established: 1264

Government
  - Mayor (2024–2028): Horia-Călin Pușcaș (PNL)
- Area: 67.71 km^{2} (26.14 sq mi)
- Highest elevation: 1,150 m (3,770 ft)
- Lowest elevation: 300 m (980 ft)
- Population (2021-12-01): 2,321
  - Density: 34.28/km^{2} (88.78/sq mi)
- Time zone: UTC+02:00 (EET)
  - Summer (DST): UTC+03:00 (EEST)
- Postal code: 517745
- Area code: +(40) 258
- Vehicle reg.: AB
- Website: primariastremt.ro

Stremț (Hungarian: Diód, Diódváralja; German: Nußschloss; Latin: Subalpestris) is a commune of Alba County, in the Apuseni Mountains of Western Transylvania, Romania. It is composed of four villages: Fața Pietrii, Geomal, Geoagiu de Sus, and Stremț.

== Geography ==
The commune is situated at the eastern edge of the Trascău Mountains, on the lower reaches of the Geoagiu River, a right tributary of the Mureș River. It is located in the central-north part of Alba County, 4.6 km (2.9 mi) northwest of the town of Teiuș and 21 km (13 mi) north of the county seat, Alba Iulia.

Stremț has the following neighbors: Teiuș to the east, the villages of Gârbova de Jos and Gârbovița (part of the city of Aiud) to the north, Râmeț commune to the northwest, the villages of Cetea and Benic, (part of Galda de Jos commune) to the southwest, and Galda de Jos village to the south. The altitude varies between 300 m (980 ft) near Teiuș and 680 m (2,230 ft) at Dealul Geoagiului, on the border with Râmeț. The highest peak, reaching 1,150 m (3,770 ft), is the limestone ridge called Vârful Prisecii, located in the west of the commune.

The commune is crossed by county road DJ750C, which starts off national road DN1 in Teiuș and ends at the entrance to the Râmeț Gorges in Râmeț. Rail service is provided by CFR at the nearby Teiuș train station.

== Demographics ==
Historical population
Year	Pop.	±%
1850	3,341	—
1880	3,625	+8.5%
1890	3,598	−0.7%
1900	4,137	+15.0%
1910	4,125	−0.3%
1920	3,864	−6.3%
1930	4,076	+5.5%
1941	4,107	+0.8%
1956	3,857	−6.1%
1966	3,605	−6.5%
1977	3,632	+0.7%
1992	2,930	−19.3%
2002	2,822	−3.7%
2011	2,418	−14.3%
2021	2,321	−4.0%
Source: INS, Census data

At the 2011 census, the commune had a population of 2,418, of which 96.73% were Romanians. The 2021 census counted 2,321 inhabitants; of those, 95.05% were Romanians.

== Natives ==
- Vasile Albu (1881 – ?), lawyer, judge, deputy at the Great National Assembly of Alba Iulia on December 1, 1918
- Vasile Barbu (1889 – 1978), brigadier general in World War II
- Vasile Bologa (1859 – 1944), teacher, deputy at the Great National Assembly of Alba Iulia
- Ștefan Meteș (1887 – 1977), priest and historian, corresponding member of the Romanian Academy
- Daniel Nicula (born 2003), footballer
- Evloghie Oța (1909 – 1979), cleric, assistant bishop of the Old Calendar Orthodox Church of Romania

In 2014, former King Michael I of Romania was declared honorary citizen of Stremț.

== Administration ==
The current mayor, elected in 2024, is Horia-Călin Pușcaș.

In Romanian	In Hungarian	In German	date first attested
Fața Pietrii	Facapetri		1956
Geomal	Diómál	Nußdorf	1262
Geoagiu de Sus	Felgyógy		1282
Stremț	Diód or Diódváralja	Nußschloss	1334

== In popular culture ==
The 2012 documentary film Stremț '89 has as its main theme testimonies about how the Romanian Revolution of December 1989 unfolded in the village.

== See also ==
- Castra of Stremț
