= Cetea (Galda) =

- Location within Romania

Location
- Country: Romania
- Counties: Alba County
- Villages: Cetea

Physical characteristics
- Source: Trascău Mountains
- Mouth: Galda
  - location: Benic
  - coordinates: 46.2113°N 23.5919°E
- Length: 15 km (9.3 mi)
- Basin size: 27 km^{2} (10 sq mi)

Basin features
- Progression: Galda→ Mureș→ Tisza→ Danube→ Black Sea

The Cetea is a left tributary of the river Galda in Romania. It discharges into the Galda in Benic. Its length is 15 km (9.3 mi) long and has a basin size of 27 km^{2} (10 sq mi).
