= Geoagel =

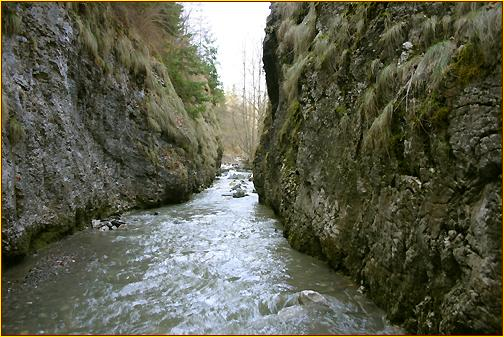
- Geoagel River Canyon

- Location within Romania

Location
- Country: Romania
- Counties: Alba
- Villages: Bârzogani, Geogel

Physical characteristics
- Mouth: Geoagiu
  - location: Cheia
  - coordinates: 46.2995°N 23.4558°E
- Length: 11 km (6.8 mi)
- Basin size: 27 km^{2} (10 sq mi)

Basin features
- Progression: Geoagiu→ Mureș→ Tisza→ Danube→ Black Sea

The Geoagel is a left tributary of the river Geoagiu in Romania. It discharges into the Geoagiu in Cheia. Its length is 11 km (6.8 mi) and its basin size is 27 km^{2} (10 sq mi).
