= Toroczkai =

Toroczkai is a Hungarian surname, where Torockó is a Hungarian name of Romanian Rimetea. Notable people with the surname include:

- László Toroczkai (born 1978), Hungarian politician and journalist
- Máté Toroczkai (1553–1616), Hungarian bishop
