= Galda =

Galda may refer to the following places in Romania:

- Galda de Jos, a commune in Alba County
- Galda de Sus, a village in Galda de Jos commune
- Galda (river), a tributary of the Mureș in Alba County
