= Cricău (river) =

- Location within Romania

Location
- Country: Romania
- Counties: Alba County
- Villages: Cricău, Oiejdea

Physical characteristics
- Mouth: Galda
  - location: Oiejdea
  - coordinates: 46.1559°N 23.6488°E
- Length: 21 km (13 mi)
- Basin size: 58 km^{2} (22 sq mi)

Basin features
- Progression: Galda→ Mureș→ Tisza→ Danube→ Black Sea
- Tributaries
  - right: Craiva

The Cricău is a right tributary of the river Galda in Romania. It discharges into the Galda in Oiejdea. Its length is 21 km (13 mi) and its basin size is 58 km^{2} (22 sq mi).
