= Cricău =

- Commune
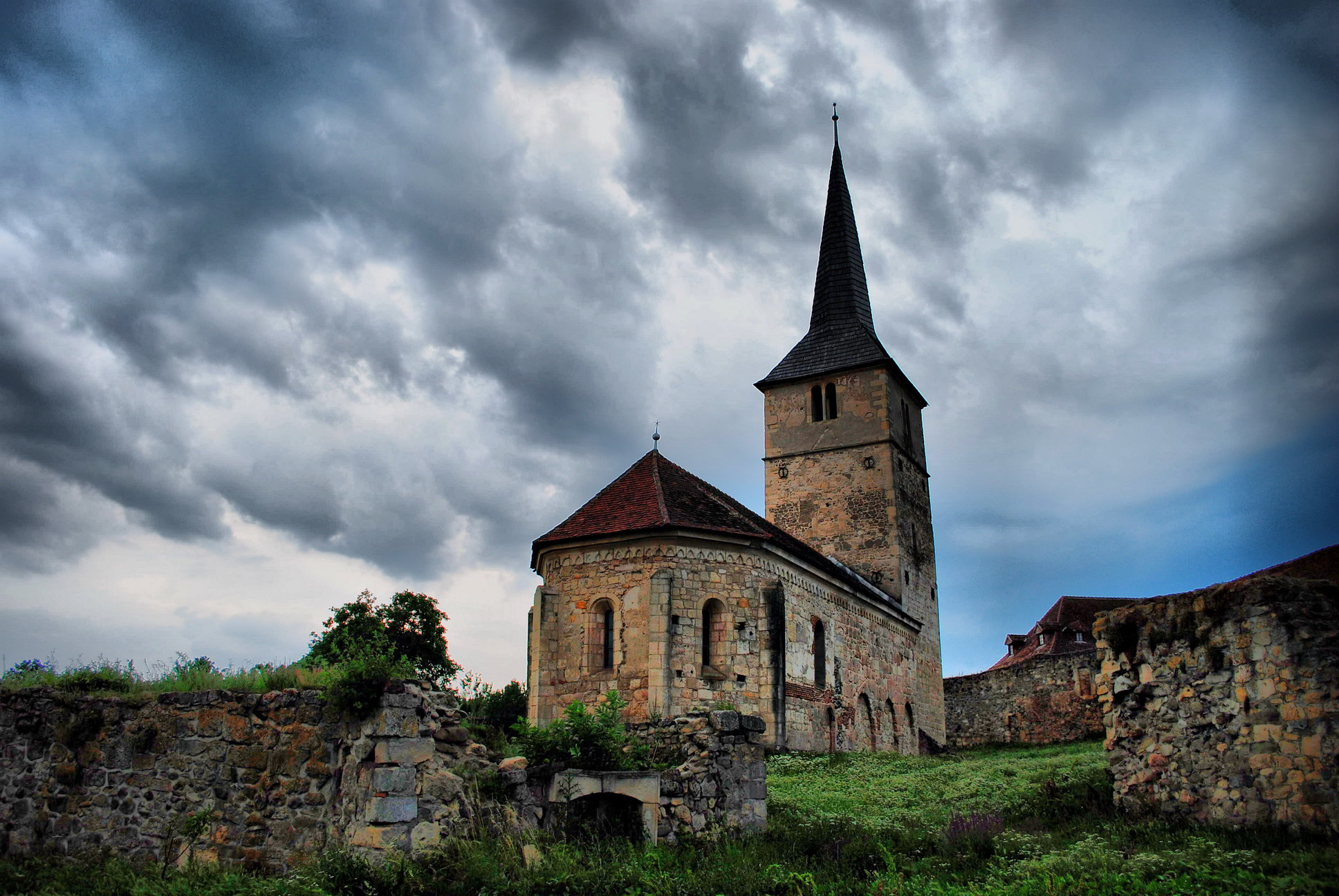
- Reformed Church

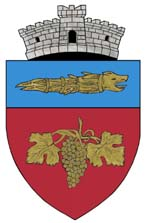
- Coat of arms

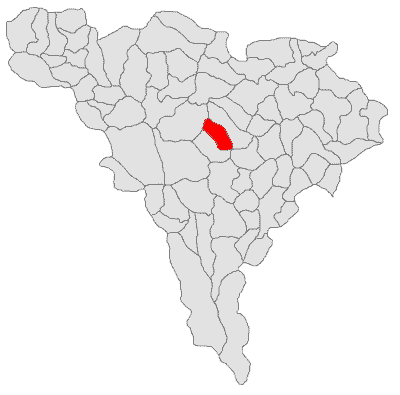
- Location in Alba County

- Location in Romania
- Coordinates: 46°11′N 23°34′E
- Country: Romania
- County: Alba

Government
  - Mayor (2020–2024): Aurel-Florin Todericiu (ALDE)
- Area: 52.63 km^{2} (20.32 sq mi)
- Elevation: 287 m (942 ft)
- Population (2021-12-01): 1,879
  - Density: 35.70/km^{2} (92.47/sq mi)
- Time zone: UTC+02:00 (EET)
  - Summer (DST): UTC+03:00 (EEST)
- Postal code: 517265
- Area code: (+40) 02 58
- Vehicle reg.: AB
- Website: www.comunacricau.ro

Cricău (Hungarian: Boroskrakkó; German: Krakau) is a commune located in the central part of Alba County, Transylvania, Romania. It has a population of 1,879 as of 2021 and is composed of three villages: Craiva (Királypataka), Cricău, and Tibru (Tibor).

The commune is situated on the Transylvanian Plateau, 11 km (6.8 mi) west of Teiuș, and 15 km (9.3 mi) north of the county seat, Alba Iulia. The river Cricău flows through the commune.

== History ==
=== Ancient times ===
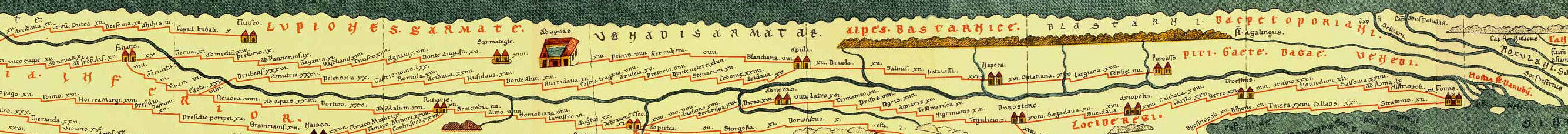
Apula on the Roman Dacia selection from Tabula Peutingeriana

The Dacian fortress on top of Piatra Craivii is believed by many archaeologists to be the location of Apulon. Apulon was an important Dacian political, economic and social center, the capital of the Apuli tribe.

It was first mentioned by the Ancient Greek geographer Ptolemy in his Geographia, under the name Apulon. It is also depicted in the Tabula Peutingeriana as an important city named Apula, at the cross road of two main routes: one coming from Blandiana, the other from Acidava. The two roads merge at Apula, with the next stop on the route being Brucla.

The Latin name of Apulum is derived from Apulon.

== Natives ==
Historical population
Year	Pop.	±%
1850	1,891	—
1900	2,729	+44.3%
1930	3,151	+15.5%
1966	2,571	−18.4%
2002	2,097	−18.4%
2011	1,912	−8.8%
2021	1,879	−1.7%
Source: INS, Census data

- Nicolae Stanciu (b. 1993)

== Gallery ==
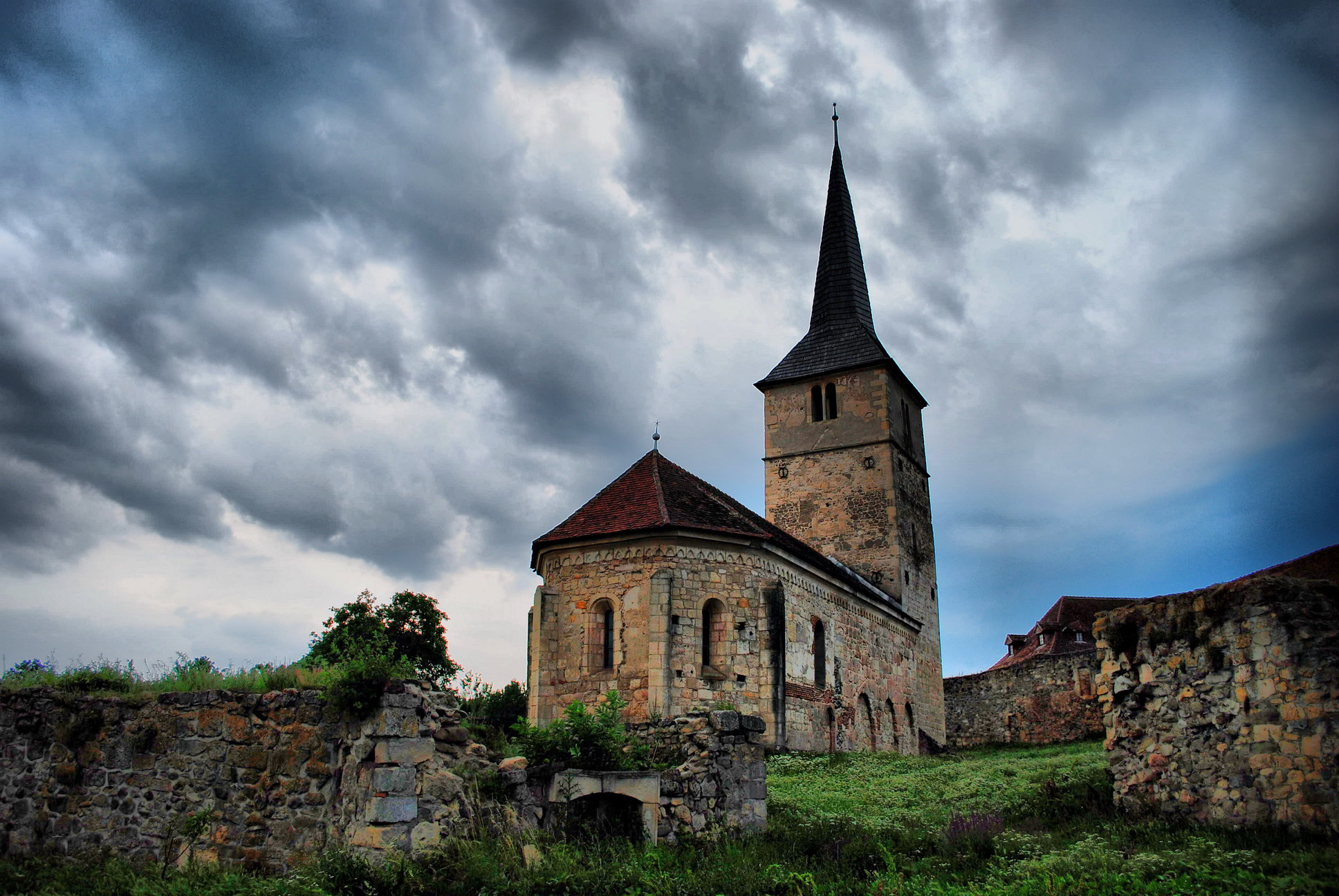
Reformed Church

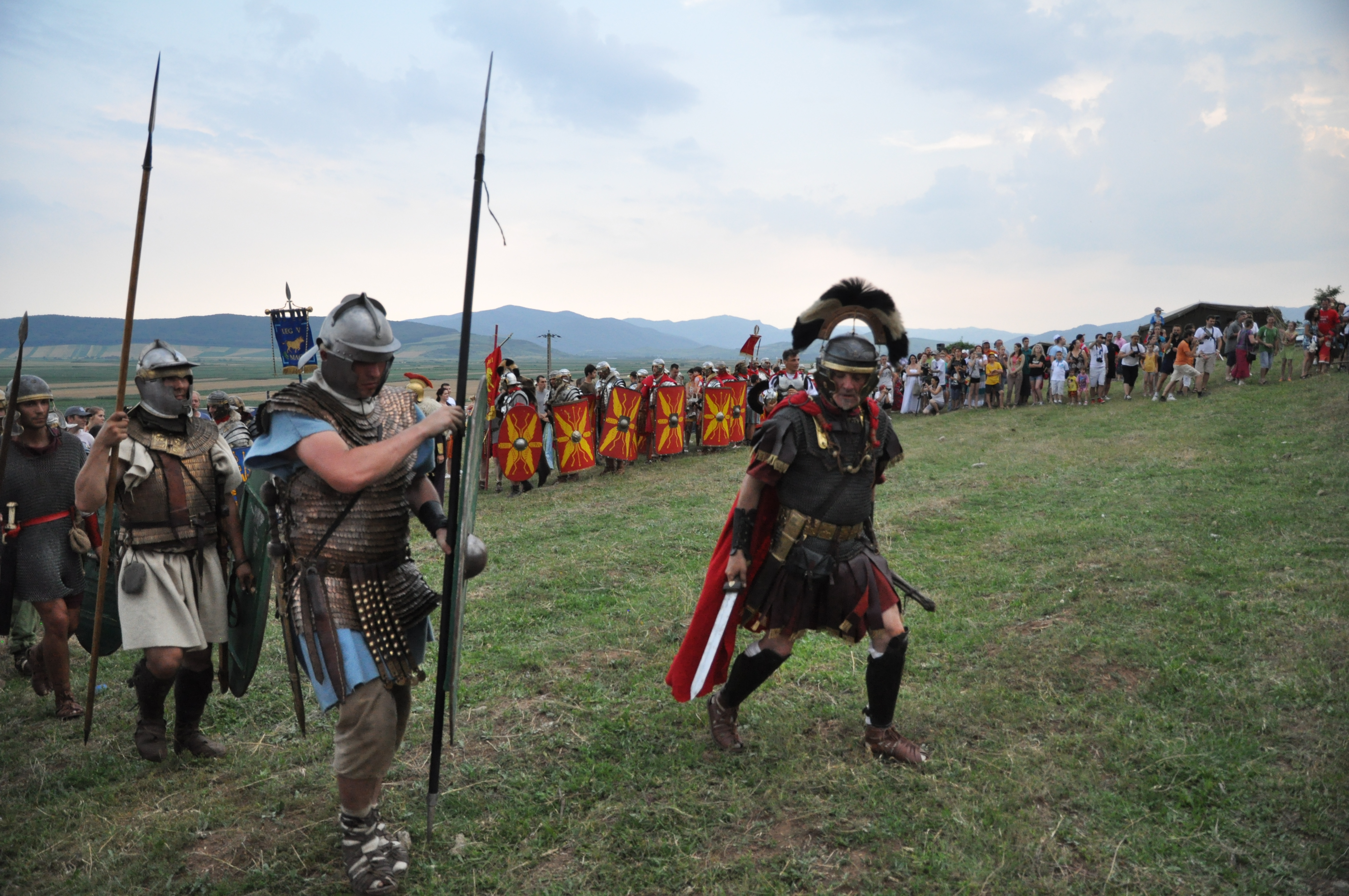
Dacian citadel festival

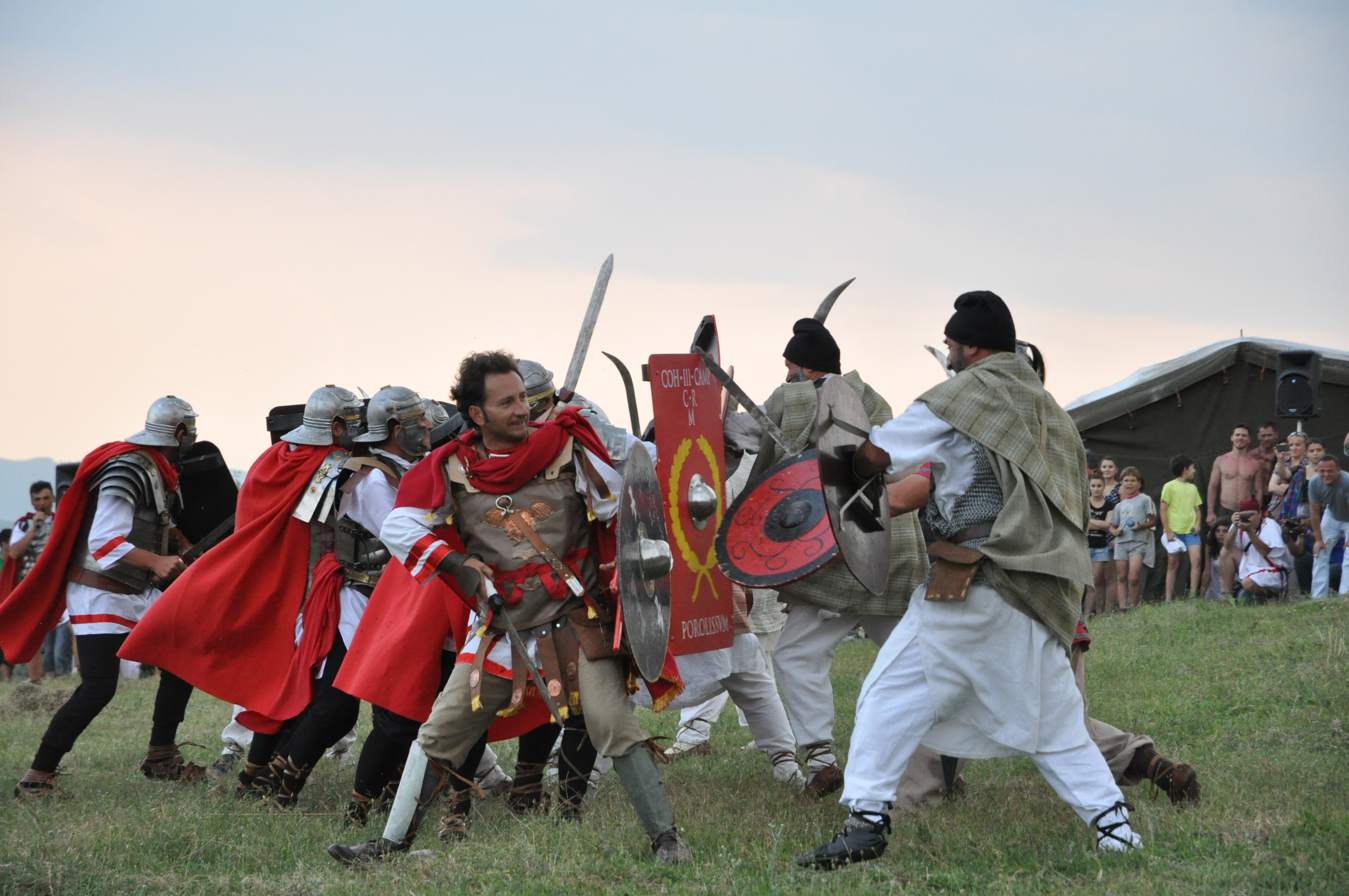
Dacian citadel festival

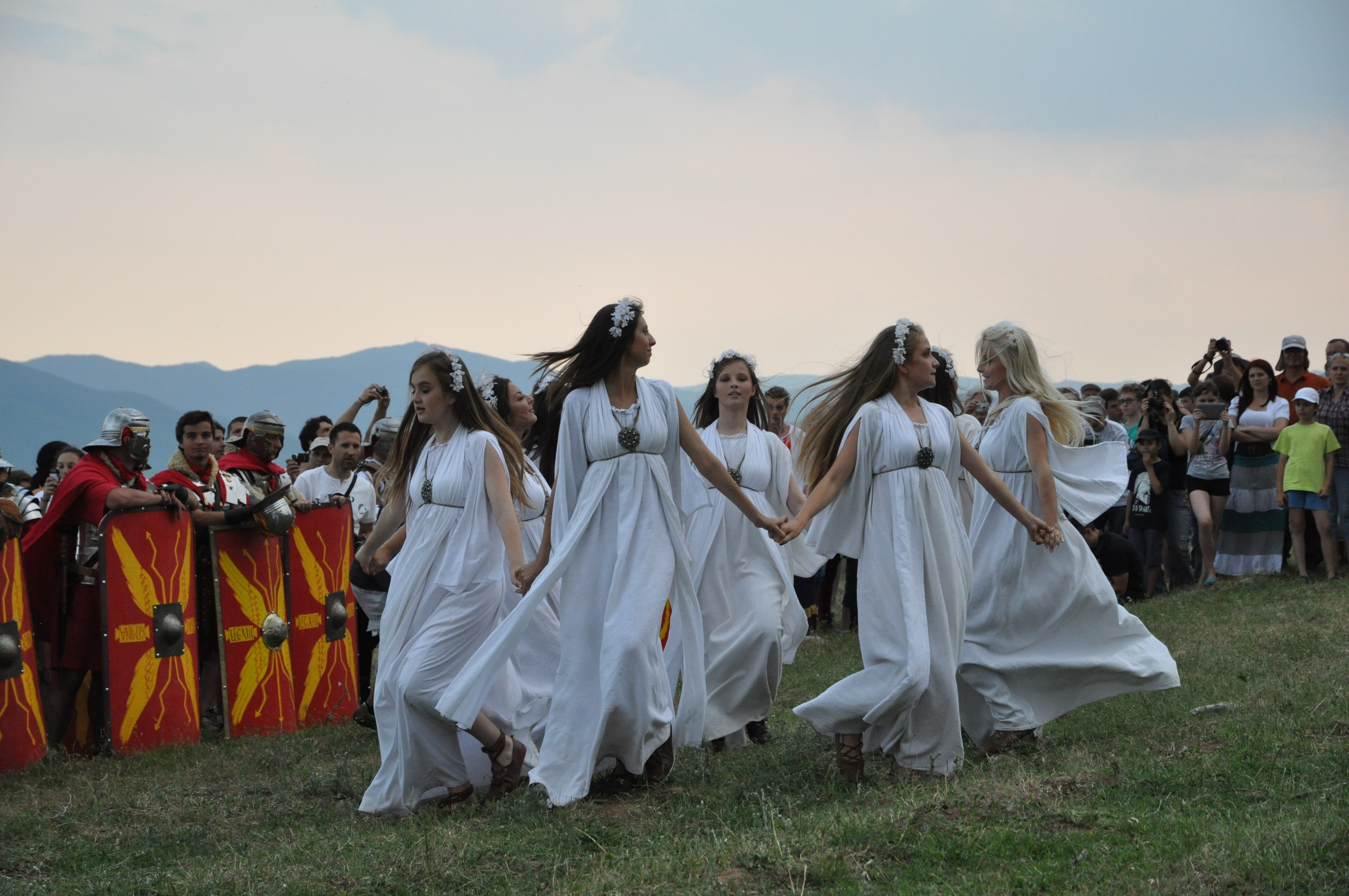
Sânzienele - Dacian citadel festival

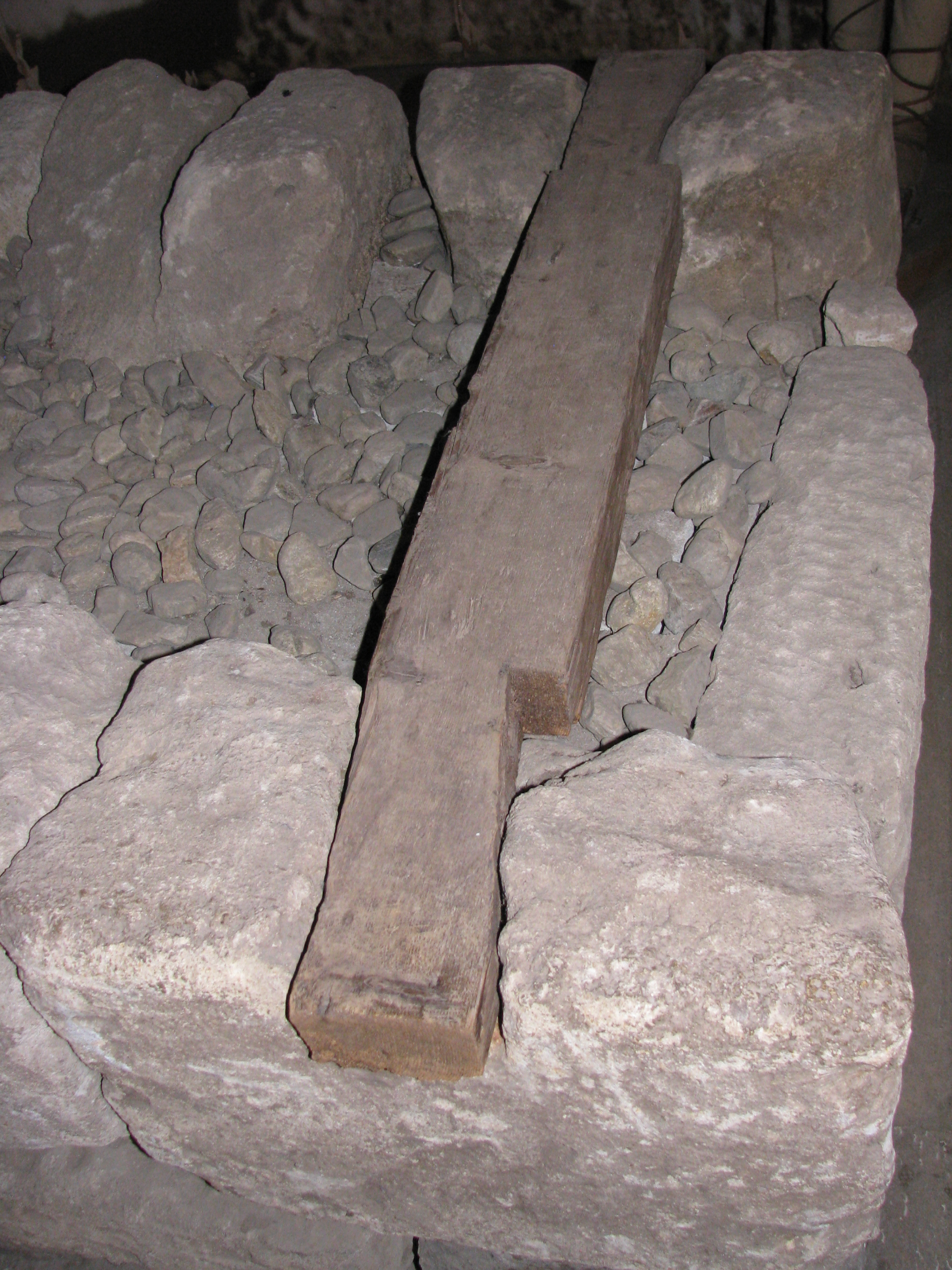
Wall from Piatra Craivii Dacian Fortress in display at the National Museum of the Union, Alba Iulia

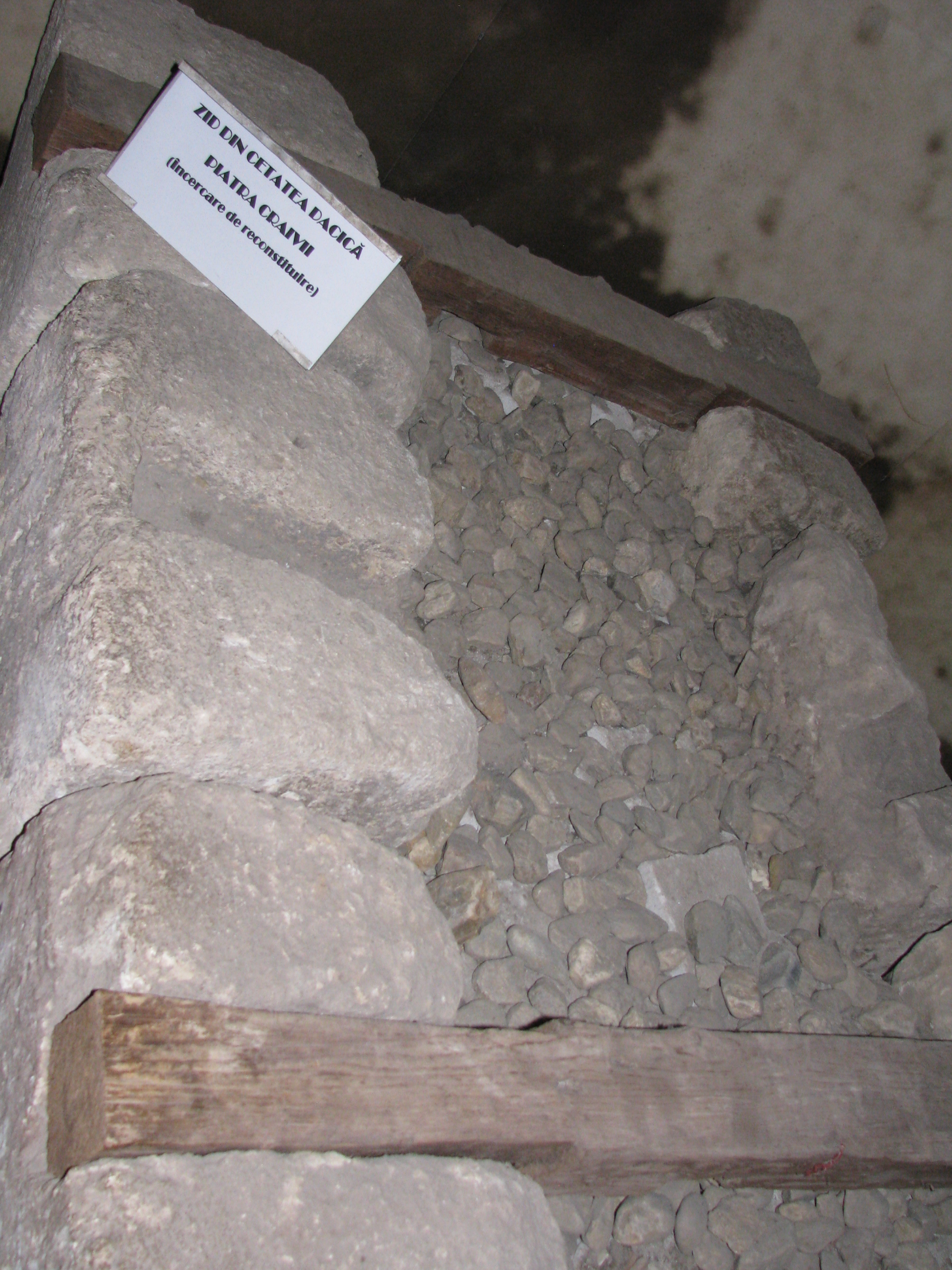
Wall from Piatra Craivii Dacian Fortress

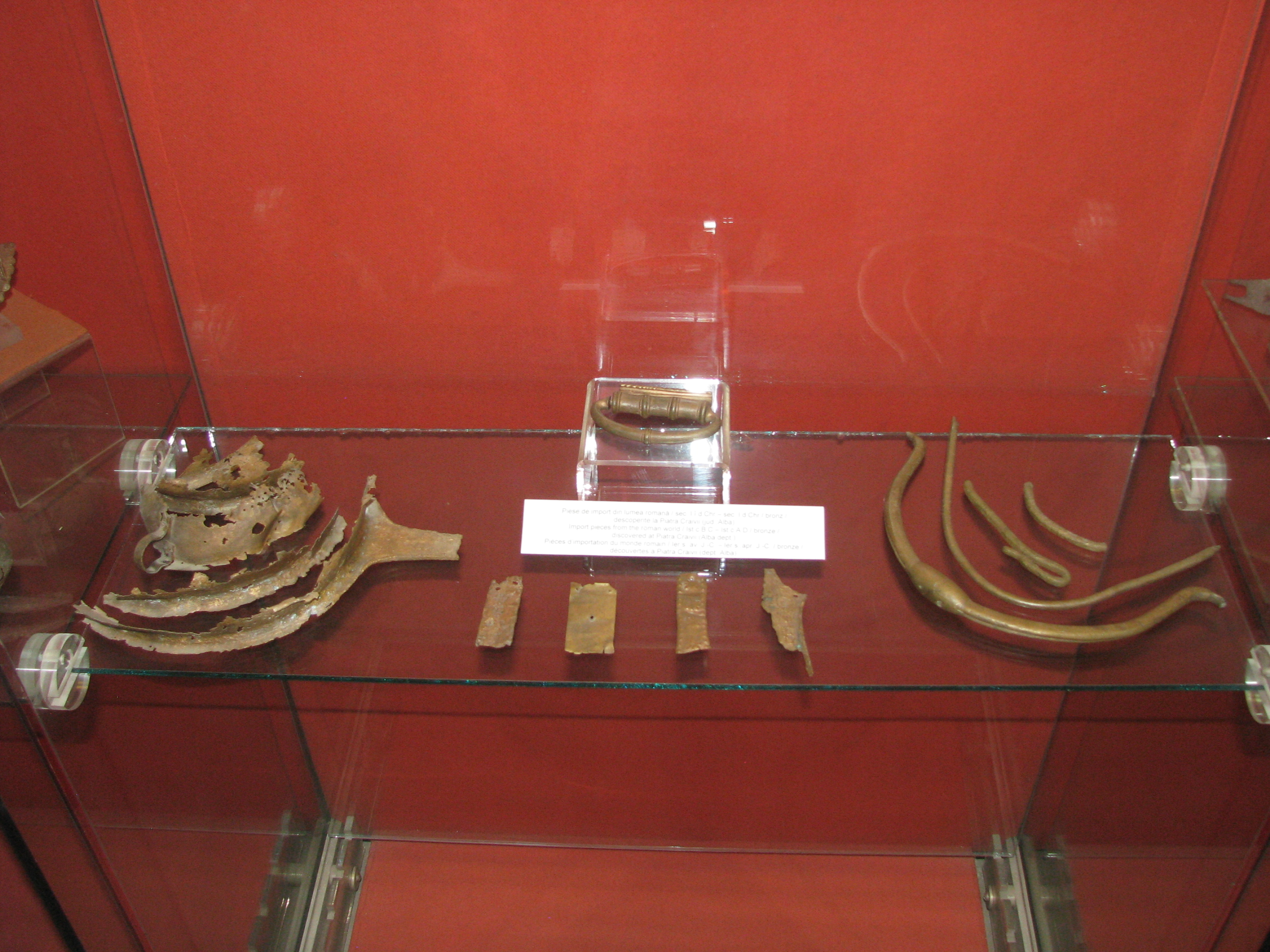
Import items from the Roman world found at Dacian settlement of Piatra Craivii,

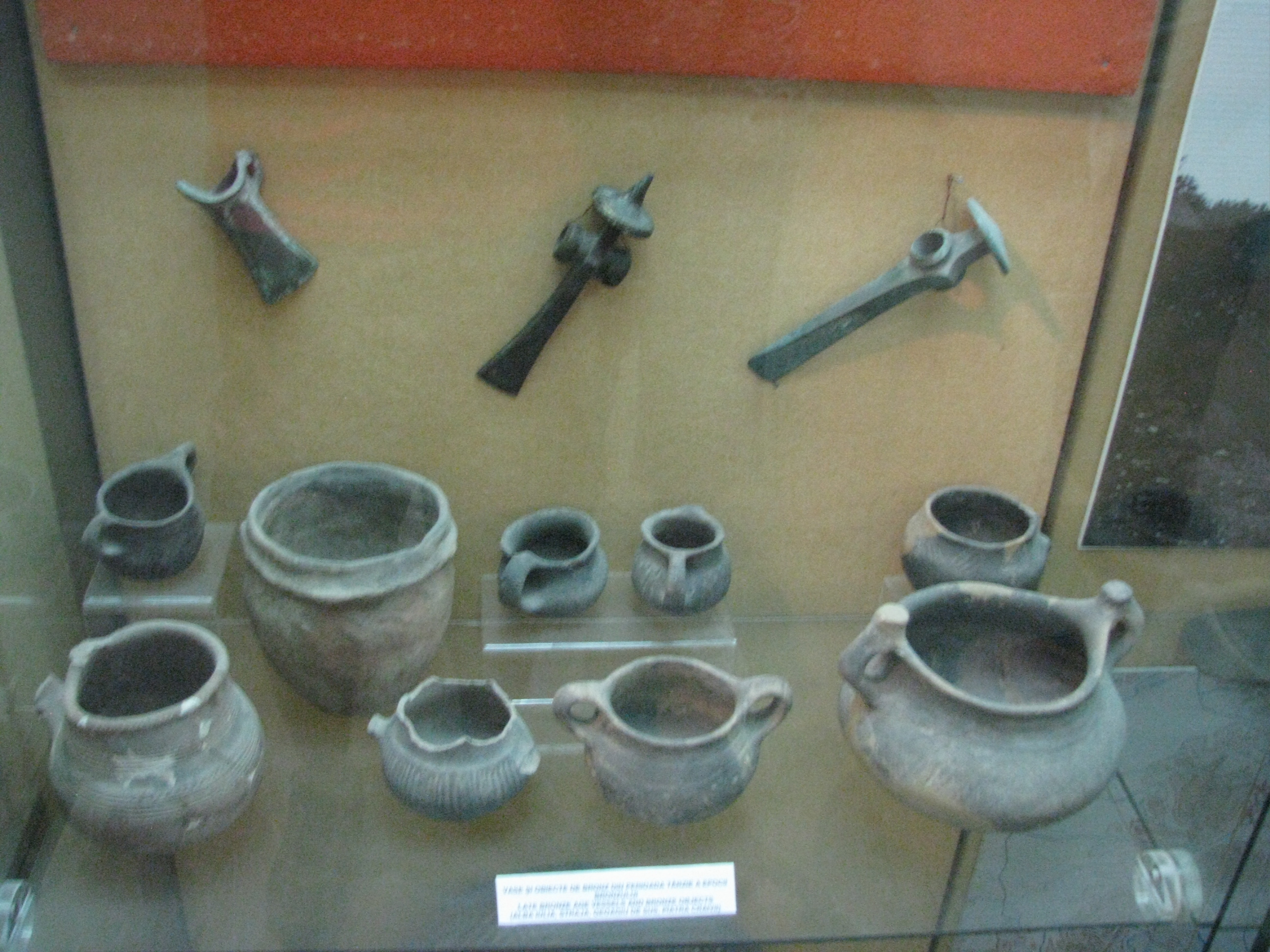
Late Bronze Age vessels and bronze objects, from various locations in Alba County, including Piatra Craivii
