= Modolești =

Modoleşti may refer to several villages in Romania:

- Modoleşti, a village in Întregalde Commune, Alba County
- Modoleşti, a village in Vidra Commune, Alba County
