= Geoagiu (Alba) =

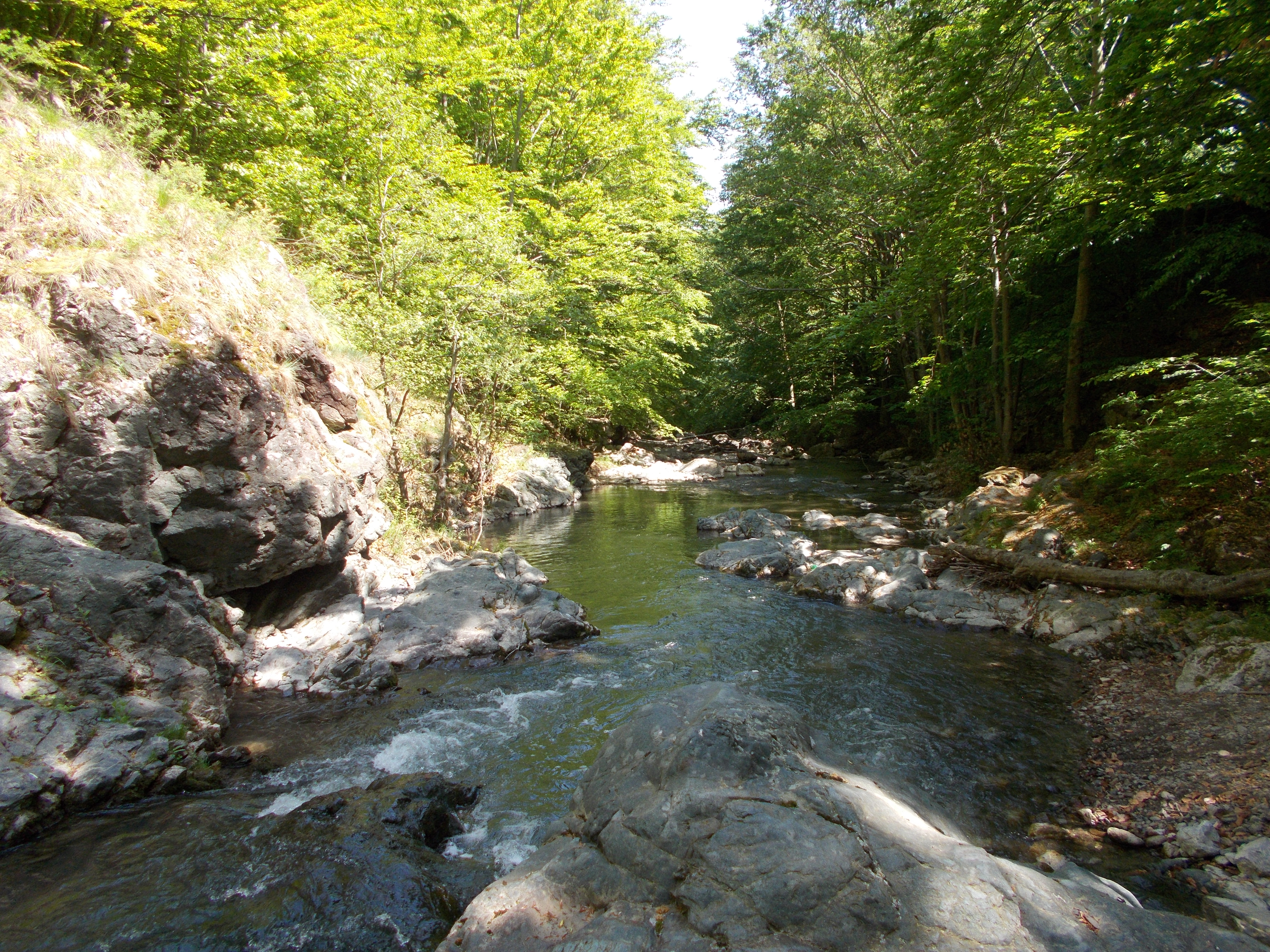

- Location within Romania
- Native name: Gyógy-patak (Hungarian)

Location
- Country: Romania
- Counties: Alba
- Villages: Mogoș, Valea Mănăstirii, Stremț, Teiuș

Physical characteristics
- Mouth: Mureș
  - location: Teiuș
  - coordinates: 46.1872°N 23.7050°E
- Length: 49 km (30 mi)
- Basin size: 187 km^{2} (72 sq mi)

Basin features
- Progression: Mureș→ Tisza→ Danube→ Black Sea
- Tributaries
  - left: Geoagel

The Geoagiu (Hungarian: Gyógy-patak or Diódi-patak) is a right tributary of the river Mureș in Transylvania, Romania. It discharges into the Mureș in Teiuș. Its length is 49 km (30 mi) and its basin size is 187 km^{2} (72 sq mi).

== Tributaries ==
The following rivers are tributaries to the river Geoagiu:

- Left: Tomești, Geoagel
