= Găldița =

- Location within Romania

Location
- Country: Romania
- Counties: Alba County
- Villages: Sfârcea, Necrilești

Physical characteristics
- Mouth: Galda
  - location: Întregalde
  - coordinates: 46.2370°N 23.4087°E
- Length: 12 km (7.5 mi)
- Basin size: 24 km^{2} (9.3 sq mi)

Basin features
- Progression: Galda→ Mureș→ Tisza→ Danube→ Black Sea

The Găldița is a right tributary of the river Galda in Romania. It flows into the Galda in Întregalde. Its length is 12 km (7.5 mi) and its basin size is 24 km^{2} (9.3 sq mi).
