= Gârbova (Mureș) =

Gârbova Orbói-patak
- Location within Romania

Location
- Country: Romania
- Counties: Alba County
- Villages: Vlădești, Gârbova de Sus, Gârbovița, Gârbova de Jos

Physical characteristics
- Mouth: Mureș
  - location: Gârbova de Jos
  - coordinates: 46.2510°N 23.7117°E
- Length: 17 km (11 mi)
- Basin size: 35 km^{2} (14 sq mi)

Basin features
- Progression: Mureș→ Tisza→ Danube→ Black Sea

The Gârbova (Hungarian: Orbói-patak) is a right tributary of the river Mureș in Transylvania, Romania. It discharges into the Mureș in Țifra, south of Aiud. Its length is 17 km (11 mi) and its basin size is 35 km^{2} (14 sq mi).
