= Daniel Nicula =

Romanian professional footballer

Personal information
- Full name: Daniel Ovidiu Nicula
- Date of birth: 20 March 2003 (age 23)
- Place of birth: Stremț, Romania
- Height: 1.75 m (5 ft 9 in)
- Positions: Midfielder; forward

Team information
- Current team: Viitorul Dăești
- Number: 21

Youth career
- CSȘ Blaj
- Gaz Metan Mediaș

Senior career*
Years	Team	Apps	(Gls)
2020–2022	Gaz Metan Mediaș	3	(0)
2020–2021	→ Farul Constanța (loan)	?	(?)
2021–2022	→ Metalurgistul Cugir (loan)	?	(?)
2022–2023	Viitorul Dăești	?	(?)
- * Club domestic league appearances and goals as of 13:57, 14 June 2021 (UTC)

Daniel Ovidiu Nicula (born 20 March 2003) is a Romanian professional footballer who plays as a midfielder for Liga III side Viitorul Dăești. Nicula started his football career at CSȘ Blaj and had a very tough childhood, growing up in a foster house from Alba County.
