= Castra of Stremț =

Fort in the Roman province of Dacia

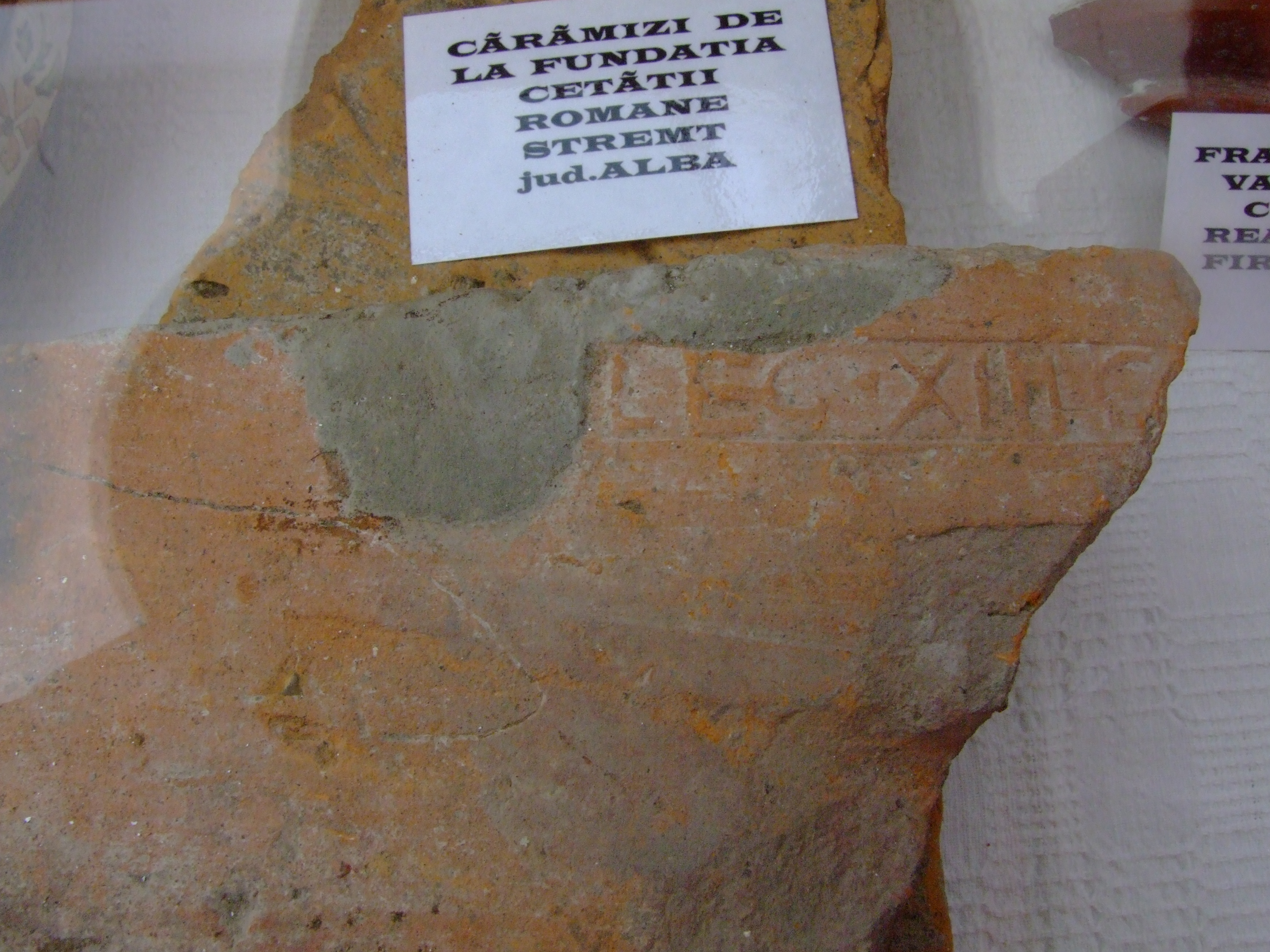
- Stamped brick of Legio XIII Gemina found at Stremț

- Location within Romania
- 46°13′N 23°38′E
- Location: Stremț, Alba, Romania

History
- Founded: 2nd century AD
- Built: Trajan

Site notes
- Condition: Ruined

The Castra of Stremț was a fort in the Roman province of Dacia.

== See also ==
- List of castra
