= Vlad Domșa =

Romanian footballer

Personal information
- Full name: Vlad Mihai Domșa
- Date of birth: 28 July 2003 (age 23)
- Place of birth: Teiuș, Romania
- Position: Midfielder

Youth career
- 2013–2019: Unirea Alba Iulia
- 2019–2020: Viitorul Cluj
- 2020–2021: Gaz Metan Mediaș

Senior career*
Years	Team	Apps	(Gls)
2018–2019	Unirea Alba Iulia	1	(0)
2021–2022	Gaz Metan Mediaș	12	(0)
2022–2024	Argeș Pitești	0	(0)
2022–2023	→ CSU Alba Iulia (loan)	?	(?)
2023	→ CS Sporting Roşiori	?	(?)
2024	→ Industria Galda	?	(?)
- * Club domestic league appearances and goals as of 13 May 2022

Vlad Mihai Domșa (born 28 July 2003) is a Romanian professional footballer who plays as a midfielder.
