= Rimetea (river) =

- Location within Romania

Location
- Country: Romania
- Counties: Alba County, Cluj County
- Villages: Rimetea, Buru

Physical characteristics
- Source: Ardascheia Ridge
  - location: Trascău Mountains, Alba County
  - coordinates: 46°26′50″N 23°32′31″E
  - elevation: 806 m (2,644 ft)
- Mouth: Arieș
  - location: Buru, Cluj County
  - coordinates: 46°30′29″N 23°36′4″E
  - elevation: 368 m (1,207 ft)
- Length: 17 km (11 mi)
- Basin size: 42 km^{2} (16 sq mi)

Basin features
- Progression: Arieș→ Mureș→ Tisza→ Danube→ Black Sea

The Rimetea is a small river in the Apuseni Mountains, Alba County and Cluj County, western Romania. It is a right tributary of the river Arieș. It flows through the municipalities Rimetea and Iara, and joins the Arieș in the village Buru. Its length is 17 km (11 mi) and its basin size is 42 km^{2} (16 sq mi).
