= Mogoș =

- Commune
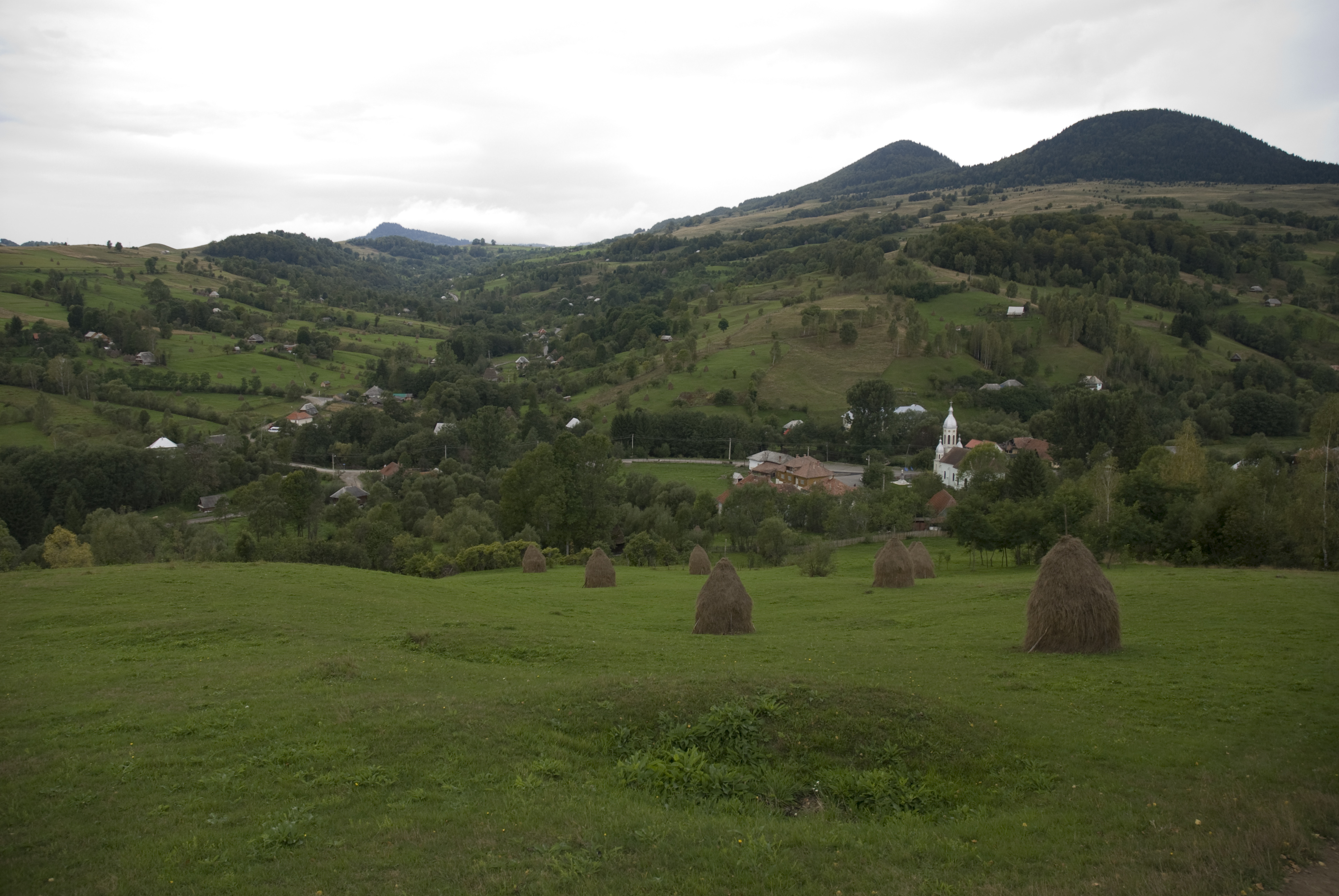
- View of Mogoș

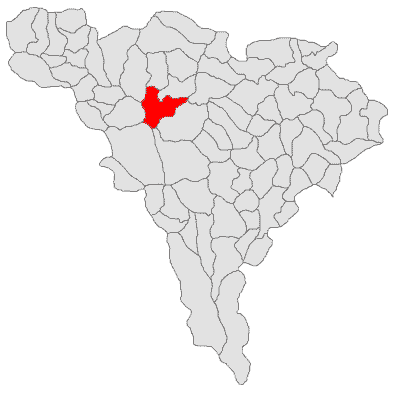
- Location in Alba County

- Location in Romania
- Coordinates: 46°16′19″N 23°16′41″E
- Country: Romania
- County: Alba

Government
  - Mayor (2020–2024): Mircea-Liviu Macavei (PNL)
- Area: 81.33 km^{2} (31.40 sq mi)
- Elevation: 809 m (2,654 ft)
- Population (2021-12-01): 647
  - Density: 7.96/km^{2} (20.6/sq mi)
- Time zone: UTC+02:00 (EET)
  - Summer (DST): UTC+03:00 (EEST)
- Postal code: 517480
- Area code: +40 x59
- Vehicle reg.: AB
- Website: comunamogos.ro

Mogoș (German: Mogusch; Hungarian: Mogos) is a commune located in Alba County, Transylvania, Romania. It has a population of 647 as of 2021. It is composed of 21 villages: Bărbești, Bârlești (Mogosbirlesty), Bârlești-Cătun, Bârzogani, Bocești, Bogdănești, Butești, Cojocani (Mogoskozsokány), Cristești, Mămăligani (Mamaligány), Mogoș, Negrești, Oncești, Poienile-Mogoș, Tomești, Valea Bârluțești, Valea Barnii (Valeabarni), Valea Cocești, Valea Giogești (Gyogyel), Valea Mlacii, and Valea Țupilor.

The commune is situated in the southeastern part of the Apuseni mountain group, with the Trascău Mountains to the east, the Muntele Mare to the north, and the Metaliferi Mountains to the west.

Mogoș lies 25 km (16 mi) east of the town of Abrud and 55 km (34 mi) northwest of the county seat, Alba Iulia. It is traversed by county roads DJ107K, which connects to national road DN1 in Galda de Jos, and DJ107I, which connects to DN74 near Abrud.
