= Rimetea =

Rimetea Torockó
- Commune
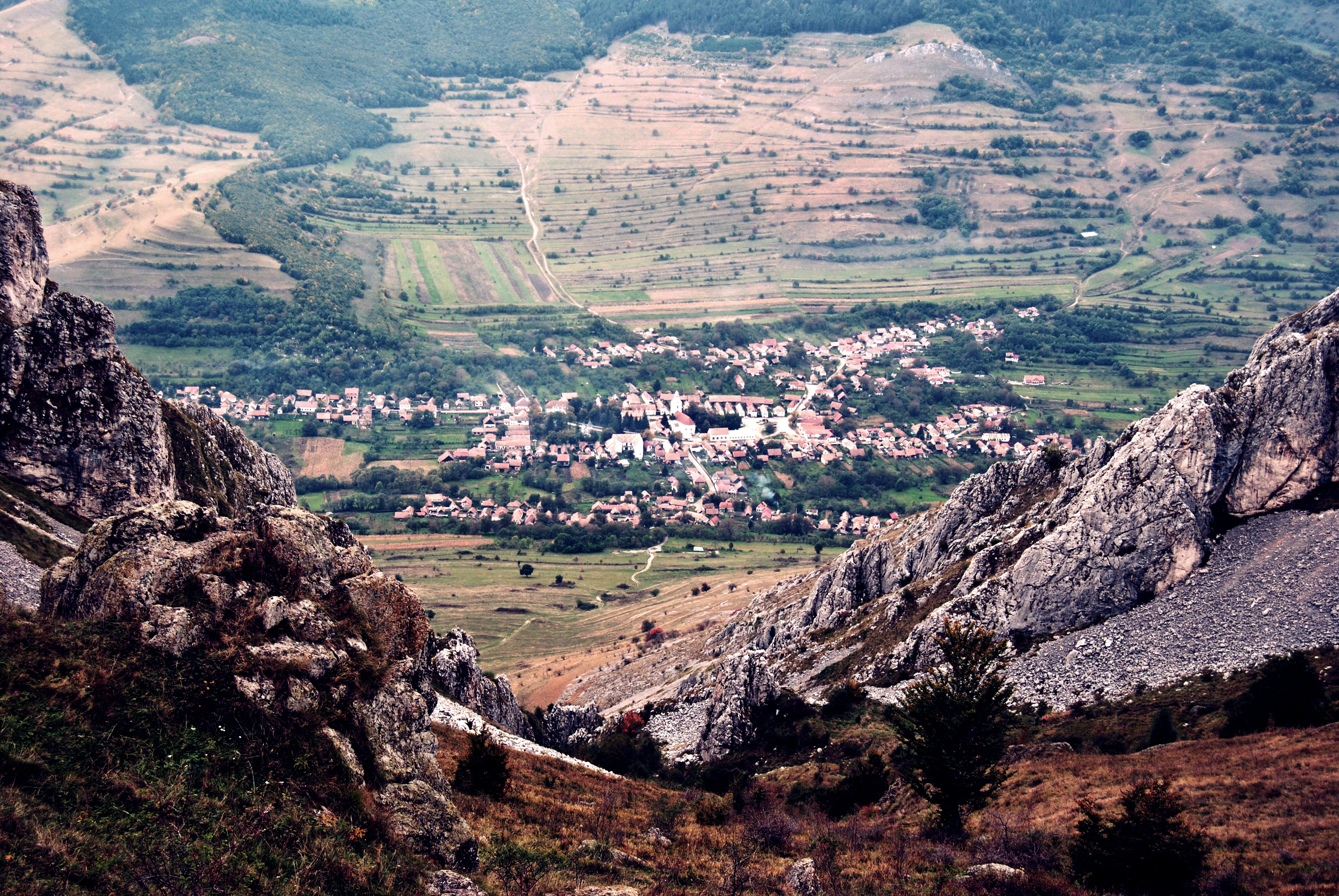
- View of Rimetea from Piatra Secuiului

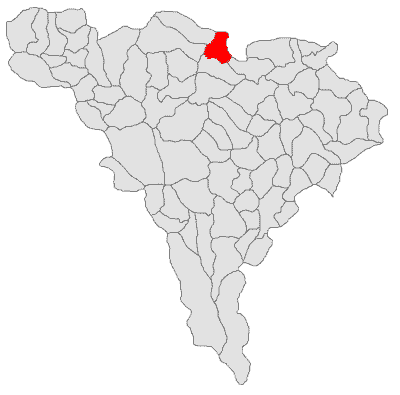
- Location in Alba County

- Location in Romania
- Coordinates: 46°27′N 23°34′E
- Country: Romania
- County: Alba

Government
  - Mayor (2020–2024): Szilárd-Levente Deák-Székely (UDMR)
- Area: 57.37 km^{2} (22.15 sq mi)
- Elevation: 678 m (2,224 ft)
- Population (2021-12-01): 1,015
  - Density: 17.69/km^{2} (45.82/sq mi)
- Time zone: UTC+02:00 (EET)
  - Summer (DST): UTC+03:00 (EEST)
- Postal code: 517610
- Area code: (+40) 02 58
- Vehicle reg.: AB
- Website: primariarimetea.ro

Rimetea (until 1925 Trascău; Hungarian: Torockó; German: Eisenmarkt) is a commune located in Alba County, Transylvania, Romania. It is composed of two villages, Colțești (formerly Sângeorzul Trascăului; Torockószentgyörgy; Sankt Georgen) and Rimetea. A former mining town, today it is known as the location of the Piatra Secuiului (Hungarian: Székelykő, lit. "Rock of the Szeklers") mountain.

As of 2011, Rimetea had a majority Hungarian population, at 85%. The village has a strong cultural significance for Hungarians and Transylvanian-Hungarians, and is home to a Szekler ethnographic museum. In 1999, the village was given the Europa Nostra award.

== Geography ==
Rimetea lies in the Apuseni Mountains of central Transylvania, in a valley 23 kilometres (14 miles) north of Aiud. The village rests at an altitude of 650 metres (2,130 feet), on the banks of the river Rimetea. It is nestled between the peaks of Piatra Secuiului (1,128 m (3,701 ft)) and Ardașcheia (1,250 m (4,100 ft)), in the Trascău Mountains. The distinct location of Rimetea at the bottom of Piatra Secuiului (Székelykő) gives it a unique characteristic, since in the village the sun appears to "rise twice" – once above the horizon, before disappearing behind the mountain, and emerging again.

== Etymology ==
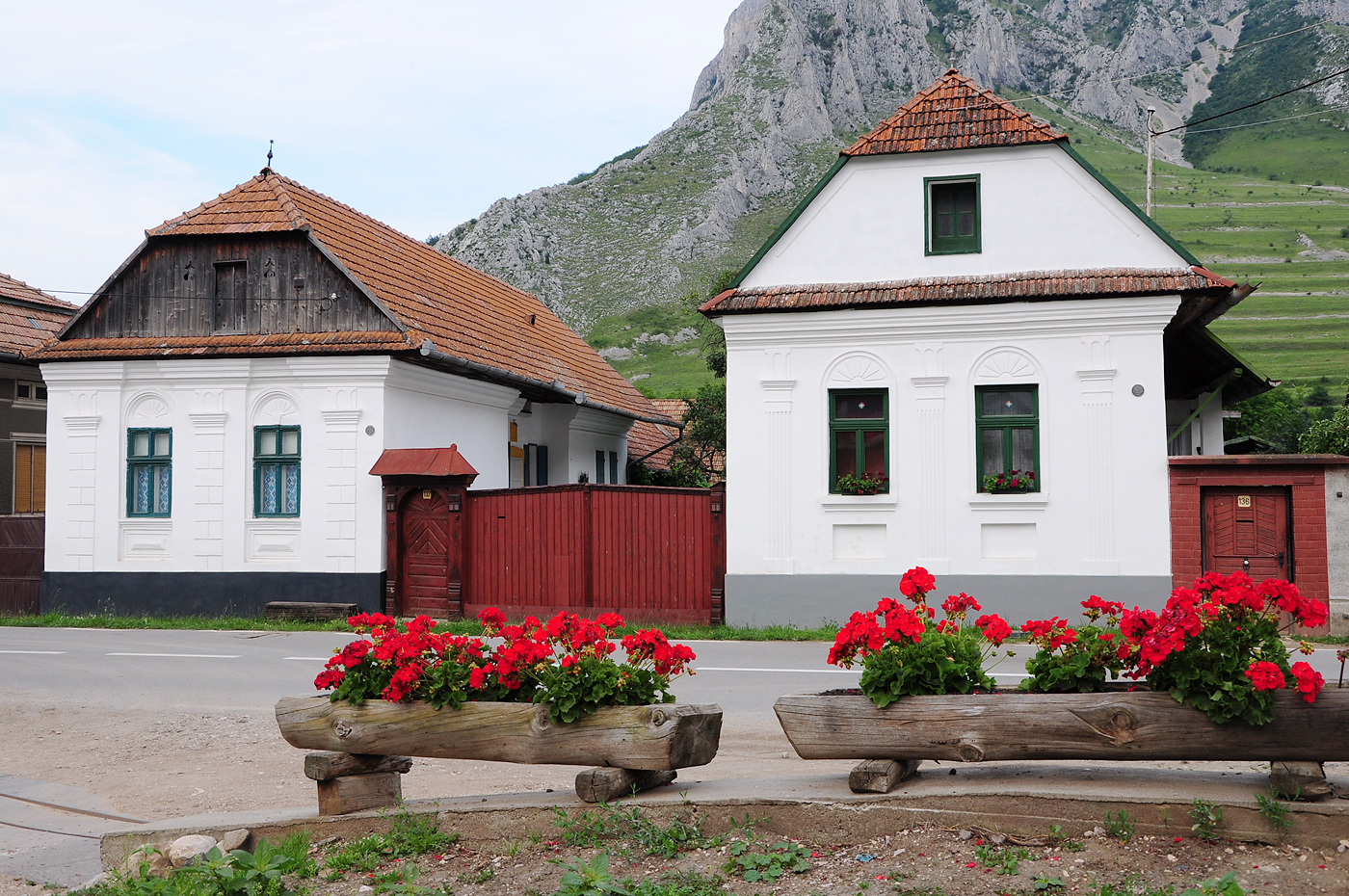
Houses in the village center

The village's name "Torockó" or more archaically "Toroczko" has its root in an old Slavic word "troszk" meaning "iron ore" or "iron-like". An o slipped between the first tr when spoken in Hungarian, and the word merged with the Slavic ending "-ov" meaning "made of", forming the name Toroszkov. With a degradation of consonant sounds, the name Toroszkó, emerged. The first time the village was mentioned was in 1257 under the name Toroczko.

The village's iron-mining past is clearly reflected in not only the origin of the Hungarian name, but also in the German name "Eisenmarkt".

== History ==
Rimetea has been inhabited since Roman times, and grew around an iron mining economy. Although the village is part of Romania, the vast majority of its inhabitants are ethnic Hungarian. The first documented mention of the village dates to 1257 under the name Torockó. It was officially renamed Rimetea in 1925, several years after the union of Transylvania with Romania.

=== Antiquity and Roman Period ===
Prior to the Roman occupation of the area, vast woodlands likely covered the region where Rimetea now stands. It is uncertain whether agriculture developed in the wooded areas, but it is likely that the flat top of the Rock of the Szeklers was inhabited due to its open, deforested profile, and its easy access to wild game in the surrounding woodlands. The top of the Rock of the Szeklers provides clear views of the surrounding region, giving it a strategic advantage used by the Romans for communication and defense purposes. The Romans conducted regular guard duties on the top of the Rock of the Szeklers, in order to link existing military fortifications in what are now Cluj-Napoca, Turda, Ocna Mureș, Aiud, and Alba Iulia. The Roman outpost on the Rock of the Szeklers played an important role within this chain of outposts, since it was from here that beacons could be lit warning the Roman castra in Turda, Moldovenești, Ocna Mureș, and Aiud of impending danger.

After the fall of Roman Dacia in 275 A.D., Transylvania did not remain unoccupied for long. Wars over the territory broke out between factions of Goths, Huns, Avars, and Gepids. Lasting peace, organized administration, and civil society was not established in the region until the arrival of the Magyars, and the resultant Hungarian conquest of the Carpathian Basin in the 9th and 10th centuries. During the period of unrest between the collapse of Roman Dacia and the Hungarian conquest, various Slavic peoples settled in the largely uninhabited valleys of the central Transylvanian Apuseni Mountains where Torockó is now located. This Slavic influx occurred peacefully in remote parts of Transylvania, and was largely unnoticed by the warring powers of the region. It was at this time when the valley where Torockó lies was first inhabited. The Slavic language of these early settlers is the source of the Romanian name "Trăscău”, the Hungarian "Torockó", and of many other location names in the region.

== Demographics ==
At the 2021 census, Rimetea had a population of 1,015. At the 2011 census, there were 1,126 inhabitants, of which 85.08% were Hungarians and 12.97% Romanians. At the 2002 census, 76.2% were Unitarian, 12.6% Romanian Orthodox, 5% Reformed, 2.6% Roman Catholic, and 2.8% stated they belonged to another religion.

Historical population
Year	Pop.	±%
1850	2,560	—
1920	2,498	−2.4%
1966	1,840	−26.3%
2002	1,213	−34.1%
2011	1,126	−7.2%
2021	1,015	−9.9%
Source: INS, Census data

== Natives ==
- Sámuel Brassai (1797 – 1897), linguist and teacher
- Máté Toroczkai (1553 – 1616), bishop of the Unitarian Church
