= Máté Toroczkai =

Máté Torockai (1553 in Torockó – 1616 in Kolozsvár) was the fifth bishop of the Unitarian Church in Kolozsvár (today: Cluj-Napoca, Romania). He translated many of the Latin works of György Enyedi into Hungarian.
