= Galda (river) =

Galda Gáldi-patak
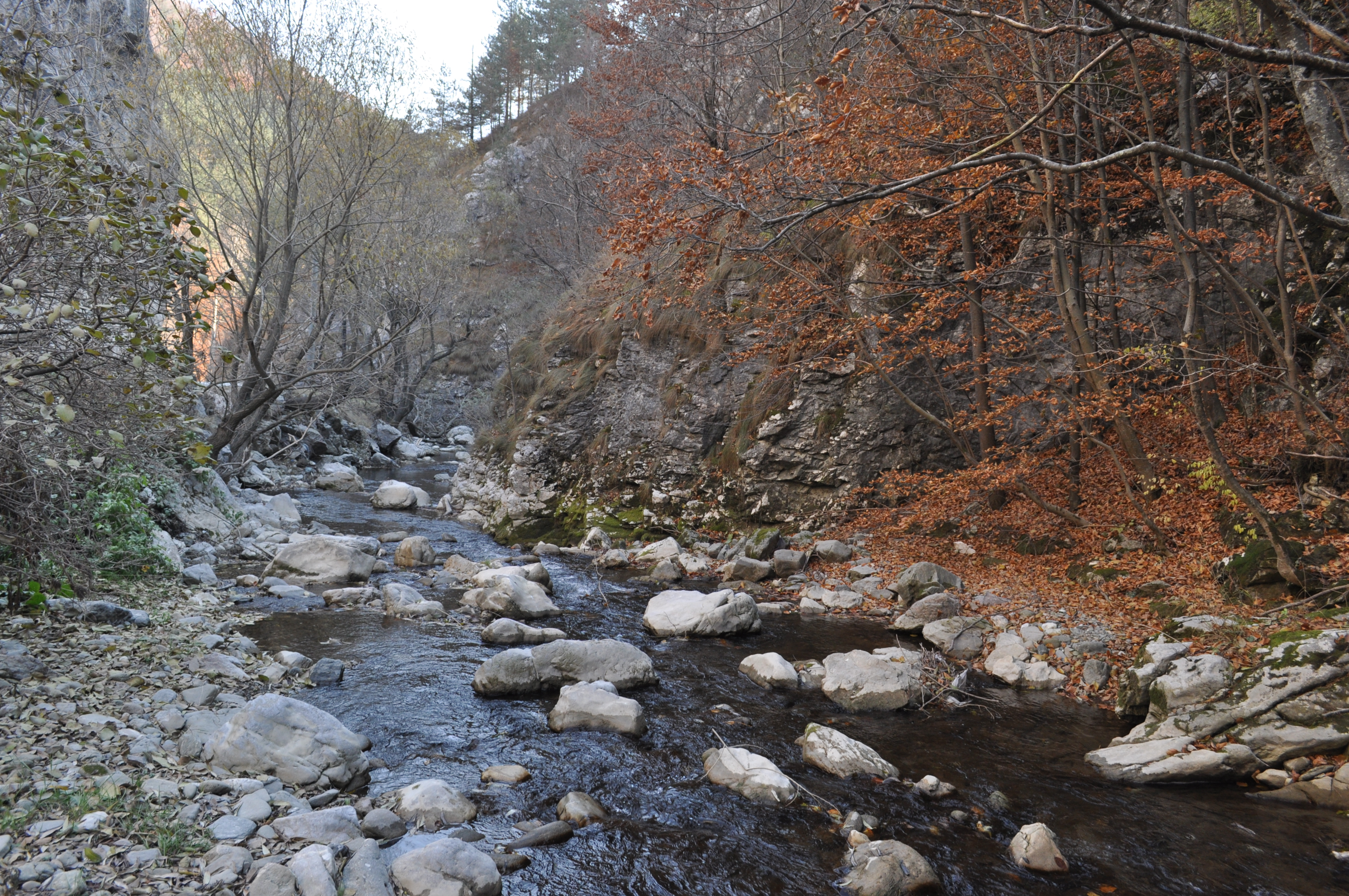

- Location within Romania

Location
- Country: Romania
- Counties: Alba County
- Villages: Întregalde, Galda de Sus, Benic, Galda de Jos

Physical characteristics
- Mouth: Mureș
  - location: Sântimbru
  - coordinates: 46.0923°N 23.6226°E
- Length: 43 km (27 mi)
- Basin size: 250 km^{2} (97 sq mi)

Basin features
- Progression: Mureș→ Tisza→ Danube→ Black Sea
- Tributaries
  - left: Gâlceriu, Cetea
  - right: Găldița, Tibru, Cricău

The Galda (Hungarian: Gáldi-patak) is a right tributary of the river Mureș in Transylvania, Romania. It discharges into the Mureș in Sântimbru. Its length is 43 km (27 mi) and its basin size is 250 km^{2} (97 sq mi).
