= Râmeț =

- Commune
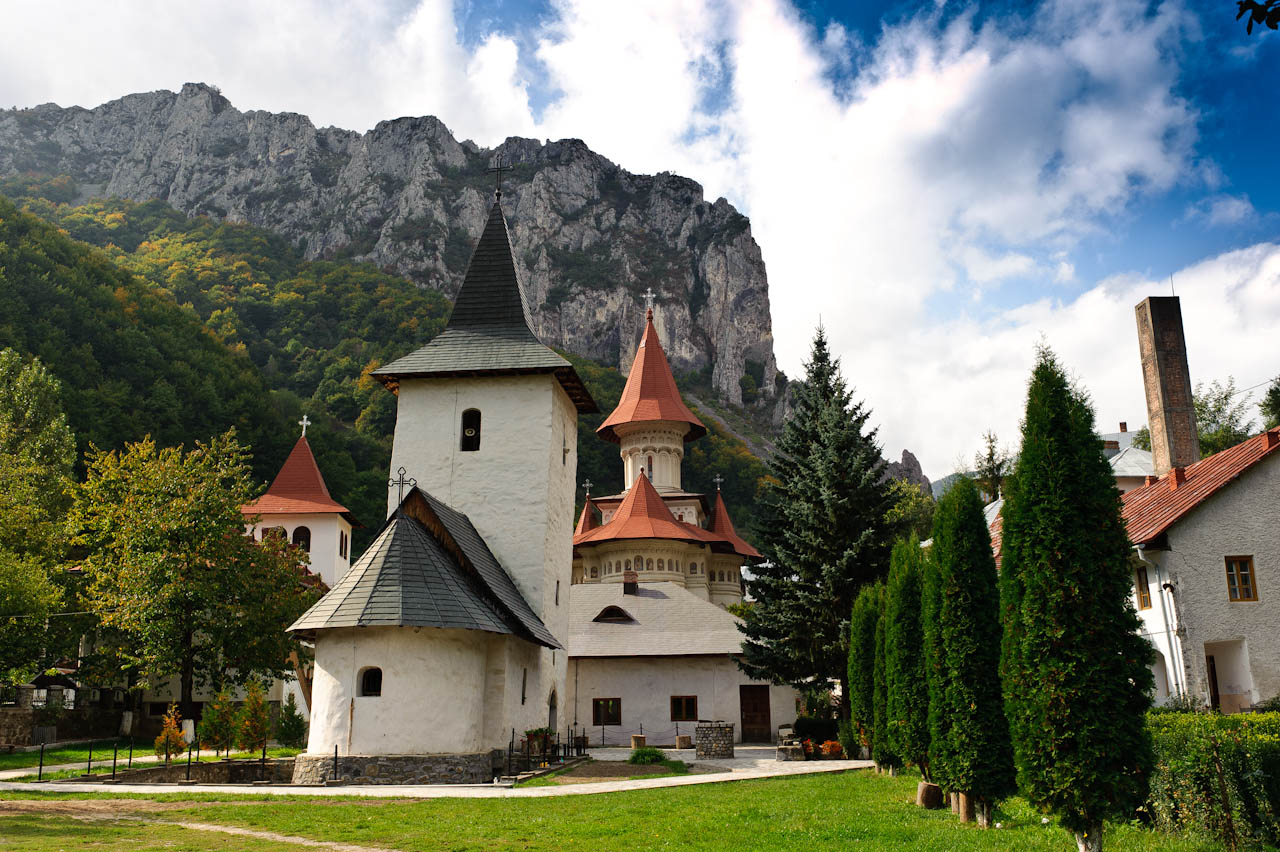
- Râmeț Monastery

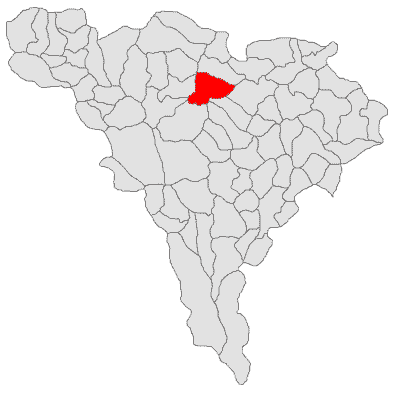
- Location in Alba County

- Location in Romania
- Coordinates: 46°18′N 23°32′E
- Country: Romania
- County: Alba

Government
  - Mayor (2020–2024): Vasile Raica (PSD)
- Area: 79.44 km^{2} (30.67 sq mi)
- Elevation: 473 m (1,552 ft)
- Highest elevation: 805 m (2,641 ft)
- Population (2021-12-01): 426
  - Density: 5.36/km^{2} (13.9/sq mi)
- Time zone: UTC+02:00 (EET)
  - Summer (DST): UTC+03:00 (EEST)
- Postal code: 517590
- Area code: (+40) 02 58
- Vehicle reg.: AB
- Website: www.comunarimet.ro

Râmeț (German: Einsiedel; Hungarian: Remete) is a commune located in Alba County, Transylvania, Romania. It is composed of thirteen villages: Boțani, Brădești (Fenyősremete), Cheia (Remeteiszoros), Cotorăști, Florești, Olteni (Szabaderdő), Râmeț, Valea Făgetului, Valea Inzelului, Valea Mănăstirii (Remetekolostor), Valea Poienii, Valea Uzei, and Vlădești.

== Geography ==
The commune is situated in the Trascău Mountains, at a mean altitude of 473 m (1,552 ft), on the banks of the rivers Gârbova and Geoagiu. It is located in the northern part of Alba County, 20 km (12 mi) northwest of Teiuș, 25 km (16 mi) west of Aiud, and 37 km (23 mi) north of the county seat, Alba Iulia.

Râmeț is crossed by county road DJ1071, which branches off national road DN1 in Aiud and merges into DN74 in Bucium. The roads DJ750C and DC75 connect Râmeț to Teiuș.

== Tourist attractions ==
- The Romanian Orthodox Râmeț Monastery, with the old church dating to the 14th century
- Nature reserve "Cheile Râmeților" (40 ha)
- Nature reserve "Cheile Pravului" (3 ha), in Cheia
- Nature reserve "Cheile Piatra Bălții" (2 ha), in Cheia
- Nature reserve "Cheile Mănăstirii" (15 ha), in Valea Mănăstirii
- Nature reserve "Vânătările Ponorului", near the Bedeleu peak in the Trascău Mountains

== Demographics ==
Historical population
Year	Pop.	±%
2002	751	—
2011	574	−23.6%
2021	426	−25.8%
Source: Census data

At the 2021 census, the commune had a population of 426, of which 88.73% were Romanians. As of 2025, there have been no births registered since then in Râmeț.
