= Trascău Mountains =

Mountain range in Romania

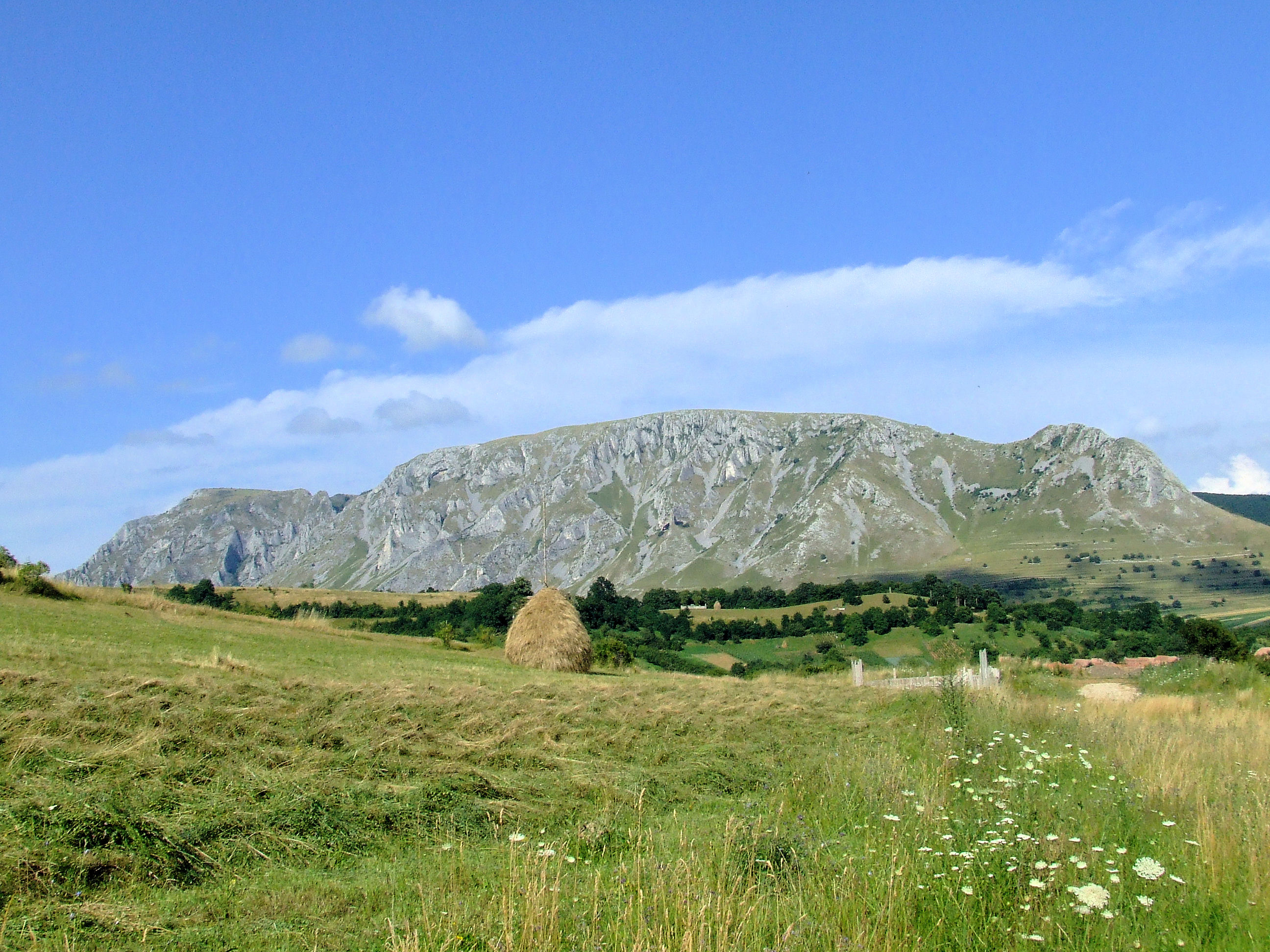
- Piatra Secuiului

Highest point
- Peak: Dâmbău Peak
- Elevation: 1,369 m (4,491 ft)
- Coordinates: 46°19′59″N 23°30′00″E

Dimensions
- Length: 43 km (27 mi)
- Width: 4 km (2.5 mi)

Naming
- Native name: Munții Trascăului (Romanian)

Geography
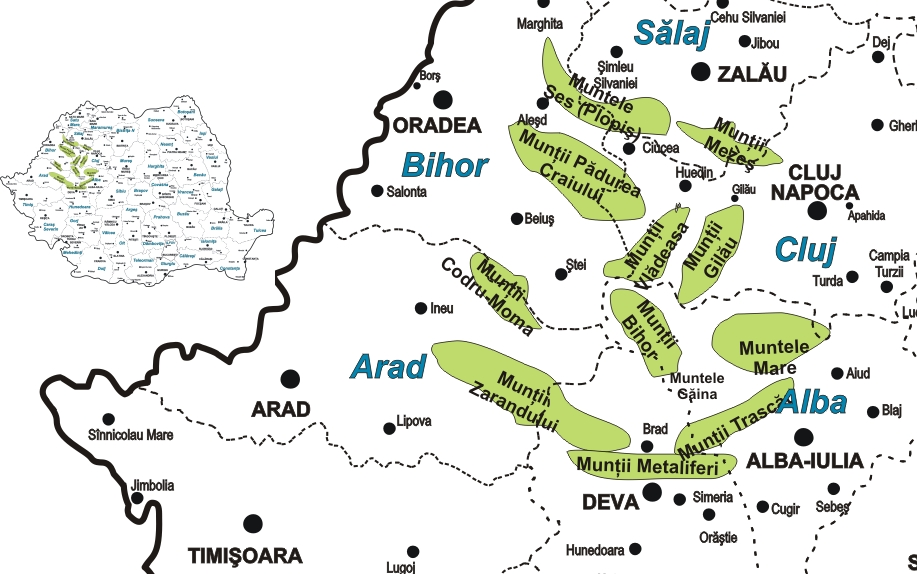
- Trascău Mountains within the Apuseni Mountains
- Country: Romania
- Region: Transylvania
- Counties: Alba and Cluj
- Parent range: Apuseni Mountains

The Trascău Mountains (Romanian: Munții Trascăului) are located in the Apuseni mountain range of the Western Romanian Carpathians, in Romania.

The Trascău Mountains are crossed by the picturesque Arieș River valley. The highest elevation in the massif is Dâmbău Peak, at 1,369 metres (4,491 ft).

The massif has a length of 43 kilometres (27 mi) from the northeast to the southwest and a width running between 2 and 4 km (1.2 and 2.5 mi). The northern sector runs for 25 km (16 mi), from the Arieș River, at Buru, to the Rimetea River, with tallest peaks (Iaru, Cireșu, Bedeleu, Prislop, Secu, Geamănu, Tarcău, etc.) between 1,200 and 1,300 meters. The middle sector continues to the Galda River, with peaks barely reaching 1,100 meters. The southern sector, which contains the Ciumerna Plateau (with an altitude of 1,200 meters) and the Dâmbău and Piatra Caprii peaks, ends at the Ampoi River.

== Peaks ==
- Dâmbău, 1,369 m
- Piatra Caprii, 1,307 m
- Vârful Ugerului, 1,285 m
- Ardașcheia, 1,250 m
- Vârful Cornu, 1,238 m
- Vârful Piatra Ceții, 1,233 m
- Măgulicea, 1,128 m
- Piatra Secuiului, 1,128 m
- Piatra Craivei, 1,078 m

== See also ==
- Turda Gorge
- Râmeț and Cheile Râmețului, Cheile Mănăstirii
- Tureni and Cheile Turului
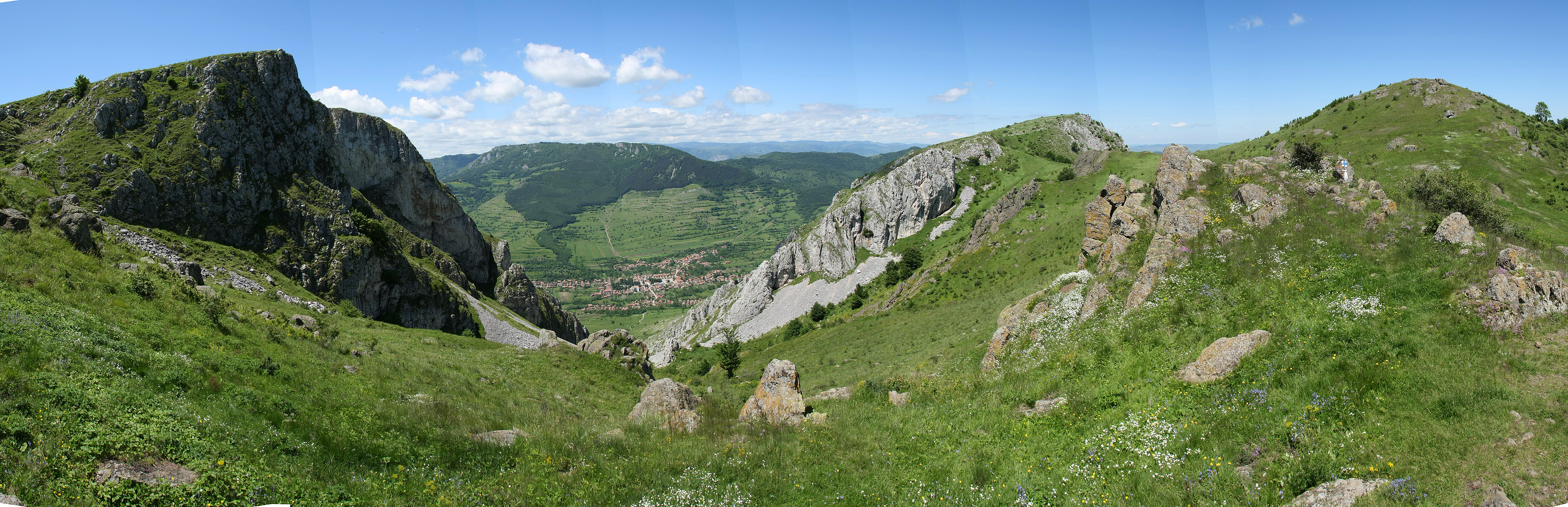
View of Rimetea from Piatra Secuiului

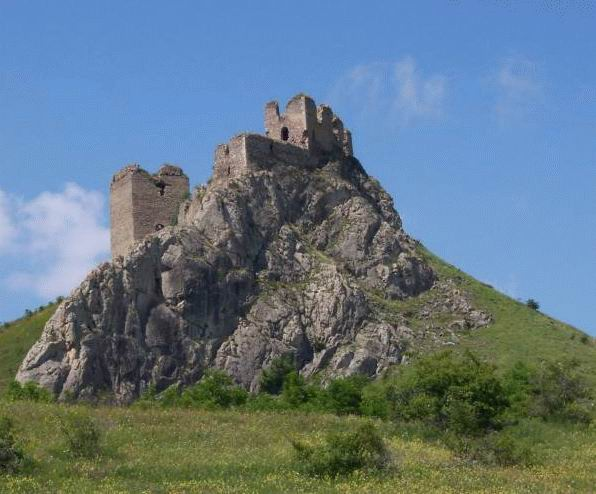
Trascău Fortress, in Colțești

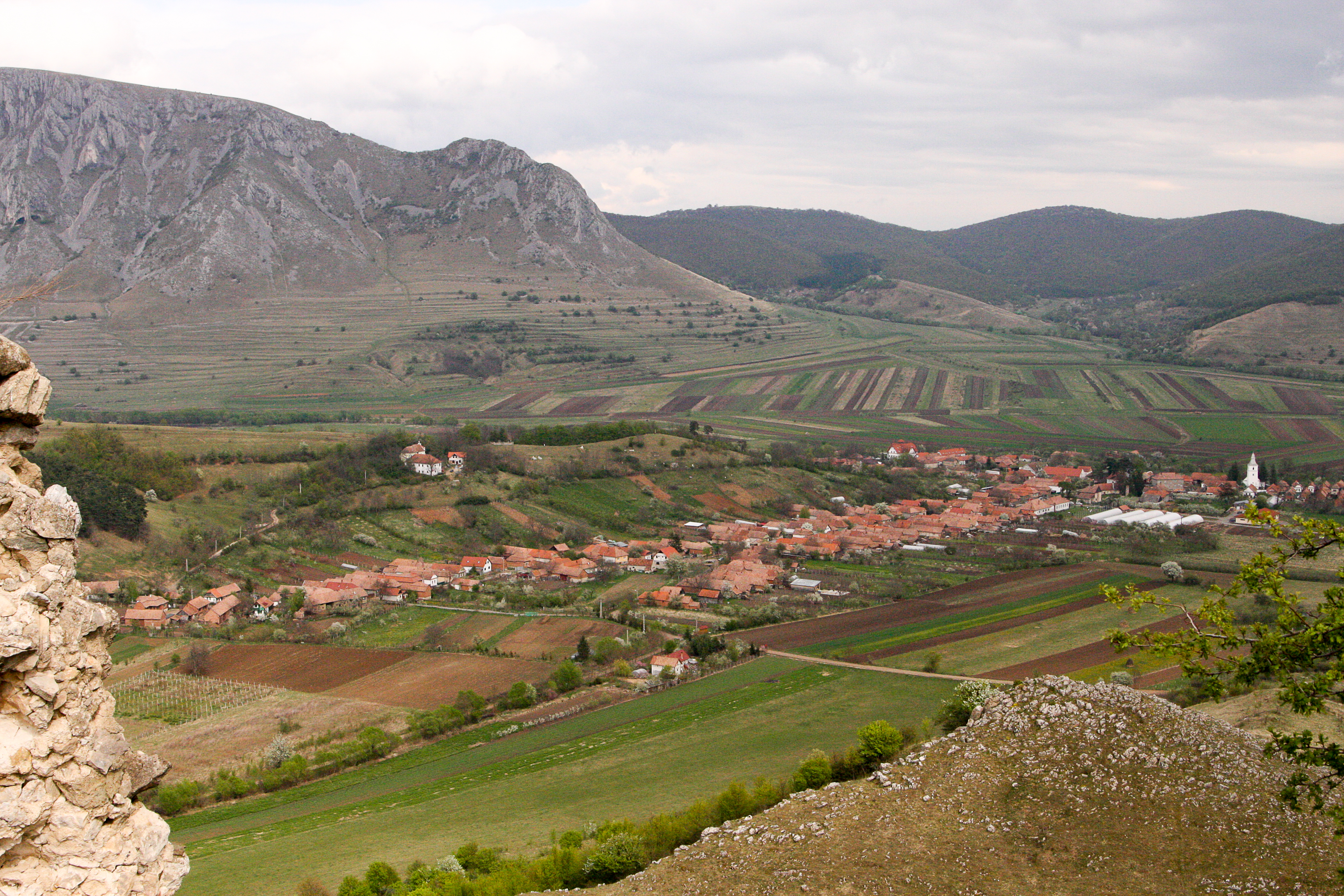
View from Trascău Fortress towards Piatra Secuiului

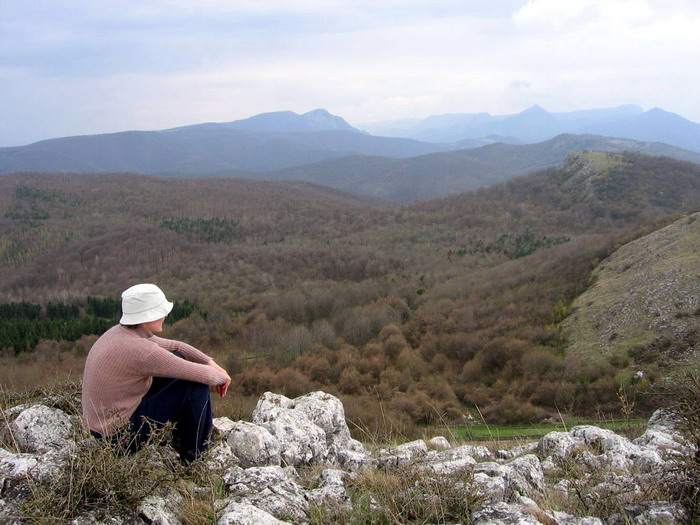
Trascău view
