= Galda de Jos =

- Commune
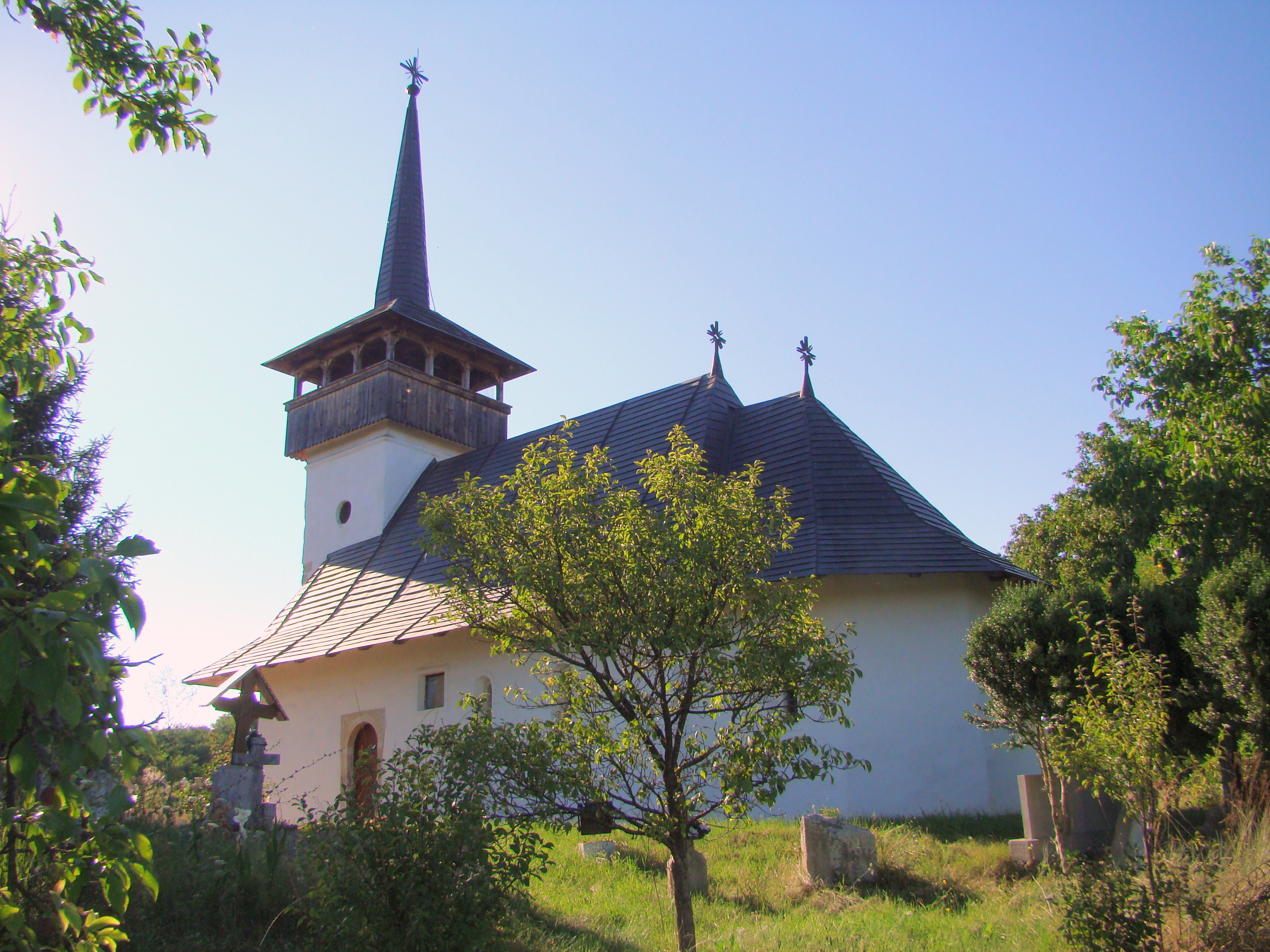
- Saint Paraskeva's church in Mesentea

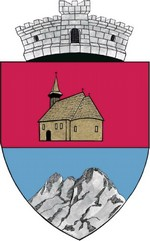
- Coat of arms

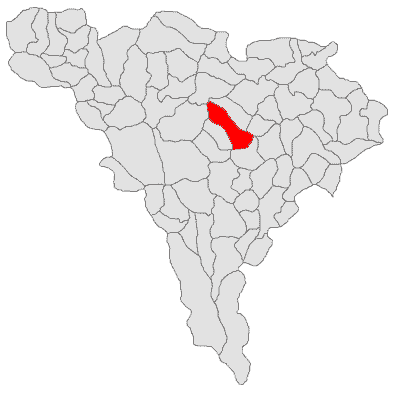
- Location in Alba County

- Location in Romania
- Coordinates: 46°11′N 23°37′E
- Country: Romania
- County: Alba

Government
  - Mayor (2024–2028): Ioan Neag (PNL)
- Area: 101.69 km^{2} (39.26 sq mi)
- Elevation: 236 m (774 ft)
- Population (2021-12-01): 4,373
  - Density: 43.00/km^{2} (111.4/sq mi)
- Time zone: UTC+02:00 (EET)
  - Summer (DST): UTC+03:00 (EEST)
- Postal code: 517285
- Vehicle reg.: AB
- Website: galda.ro

Galda de Jos (German: Unter-Hahnenberg; Hungarian: Alsógáld) is a commune located in Alba County, Transylvania, Romania. It is composed of eleven villages: Benic (Borosbenedek), Cetea (Csáklya), Galda de Jos (Alsógáld), Galda de Sus (Felsőgáld), Lupșeni, Măgura, Mesentea (Kismindszent), Oiejdea (Vajasd), Poiana Galdei, Răicani (Rajkány), and Zăgriș.

The commune lies on the banks of the river Galda, in the central-north part of the county, 6 km (3.7 mi) southwest of Teiuș and 20 km (12 mi) north of the county seat, Alba Iulia.

Historical population
Year	Pop.	±%
1850	5,027	—
1900	5,899	+17.3%
1956	5,619	−4.7%
1992	4,863	−13.5%
2002	4,882	+0.4%
2011	4,516	−7.5%
2021	4,373	−3.2%
Source: INS, Census data

== See also ==
- List of massacres in Romania for 1849 massacre of Hungarians
