= Teiuș =

- Town
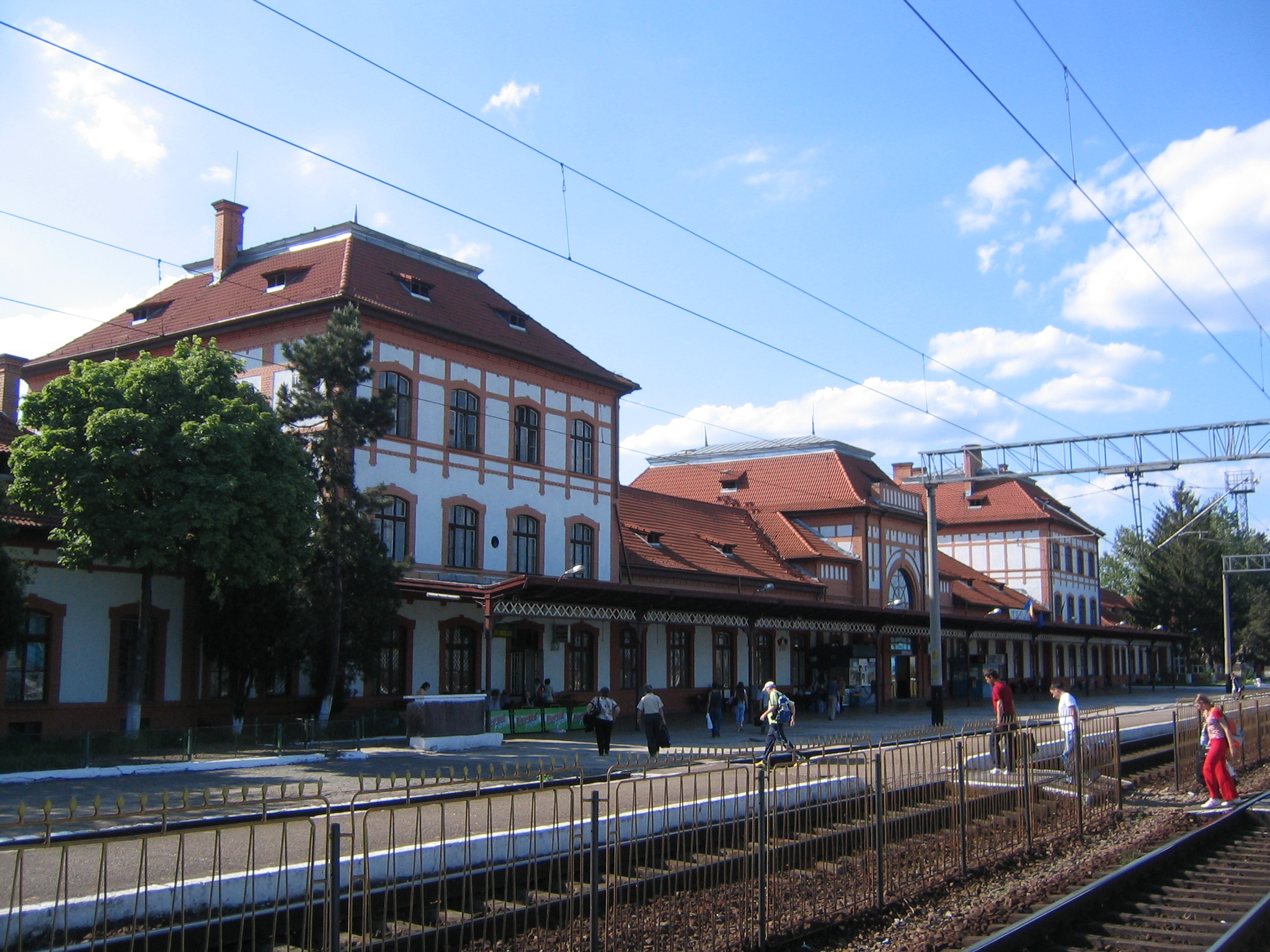
- Teiuș railway station

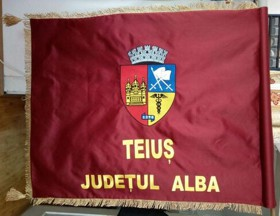
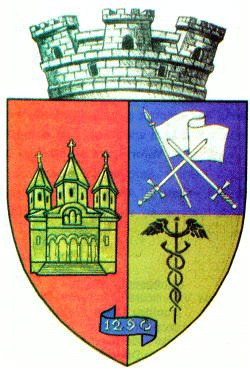
- Flag Coat of arms

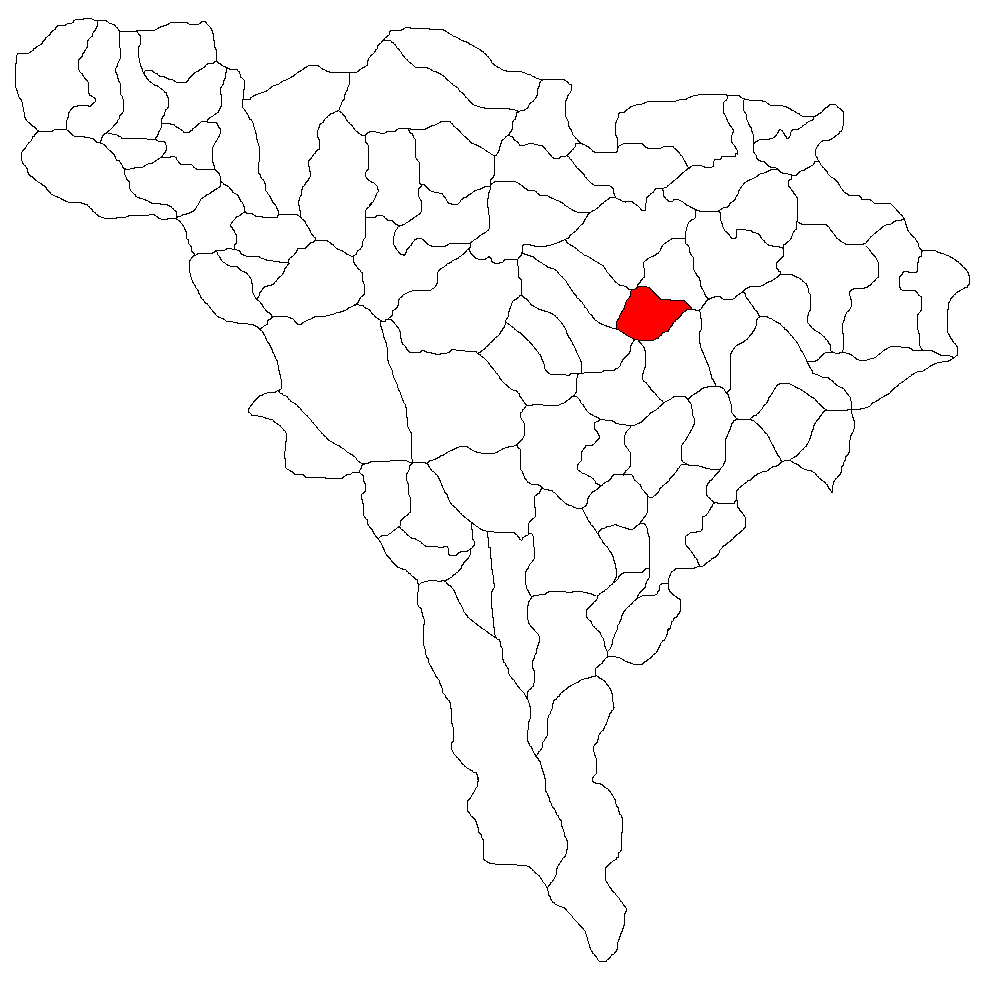
- Location in Alba County

- Location in Romania
- Coordinates: 46°12′0″N 23°40′48″E
- Country: Romania
- County: Alba

Government
  - Mayor (2024–2028): Mirel Vasile Hălălai (PSD)
- Area: 44.56 km^{2} (17.20 sq mi)
- Elevation: 208 m (682 ft)
- Population (2021-12-01): 6,308
  - Density: 141.6/km^{2} (366.6/sq mi)
- Time zone: UTC+02:00 (EET)
  - Summer (DST): UTC+03:00 (EEST)
- Postal code: 515900
- Area code: (+40) 02 58
- Vehicle reg.: AB
- Website: primariateius.ro

Teiuș (Romanian pronunciation: [teˈjuʃ], German: Dreikirchen, Dornstadt; Hungarian: Tövis) is a town in Alba County, Transylvania, Romania, with a population of 6,308 inhabitants as of 2021. The town, declared as such in 1994, administers four villages: Beldiu (Marosbéld), Căpud (Magyarkapud), Coșlariu Nou (Újkoslárd), and Pețelca (Pacalka).

The town is located near the confluence of the Geoagiu River with the Mureș River. Teiuș is a junction point on the Cluj-Napoca–Sighișoara railway. It has several old churches, the most notable being the 17th century Uniate church and the Roman Catholic church, built for John Hunyadi in 1449 and rebuilt (1701–1704) in a simple Gothic style.

== Demographics ==
Historical population
Year	Pop.	±%
1850	2,935	—
1880	3,311	+12.8%
1910	5,088	+53.7%
1930	6,636	+30.4%
1941	7,023	+5.8%
1956	6,614	−5.8%
1966	7,162	+8.3%
1977	7,718	+7.8%
1992	7,199	−6.7%
2002	7,284	+1.2%
2011	6,695	−8.1%
2021	6,308	−5.8%
Source: Census data

At the 2011 census, Teiuș had 6,695 inhabitants, of which 83.57% were Romanians, 7.63% Roma, and 3.87% Hungarians. At the 2021 census, the town had a population of 6,308; of those, 80.83% were Romanians, 7.13% Roma, and 2.79% Hungarians.

== Natives ==
- Ioan Bălan (1880–1959), Romanian bishop of the Greek-Catholic Church
- Norica Câmpean (born 1972), race walker
- Vlad Domșa (born 2003), footballer

== Climate ==
Teiuș has a humid continental climate (Cfb in the Köppen climate classification).

Climate data for Teiuș
Month	Jan	Feb	Mar	Apr	May	Jun	Jul	Aug	Sep	Oct	Nov	Dec	Year
Mean daily maximum °C (°F)	2.5 (36.5)	5.2 (41.4)	10.5 (50.9)	16.3 (61.3)	20.8 (69.4)	24.1 (75.4)	26 (79)	26.2 (79.2)	21.1 (70.0)	15.5 (59.9)	9.6 (49.3)	3.8 (38.8)	15.1 (59.3)
Daily mean °C (°F)	−1.3 (29.7)	0.8 (33.4)	5.2 (41.4)	10.9 (51.6)	15.8 (60.4)	19.3 (66.7)	21.2 (70.2)	21.3 (70.3)	16.2 (61.2)	10.6 (51.1)	5.3 (41.5)	0.2 (32.4)	10.5 (50.8)
Mean daily minimum °C (°F)	−4.7 (23.5)	−3.2 (26.2)	0.1 (32.2)	5.1 (41.2)	10.1 (50.2)	13.8 (56.8)	15.7 (60.3)	16.1 (61.0)	11.5 (52.7)	6.1 (43.0)	1.7 (35.1)	−2.8 (27.0)	5.8 (42.4)
Average precipitation mm (inches)	33 (1.3)	31 (1.2)	43 (1.7)	60 (2.4)	79 (3.1)	94 (3.7)	88 (3.5)	73 (2.9)	59 (2.3)	47 (1.9)	37 (1.5)	40 (1.6)	684 (27.1)
Source: https://en.climate-data.org/europe/romania/alba/teius-15210/

== Image gallery ==
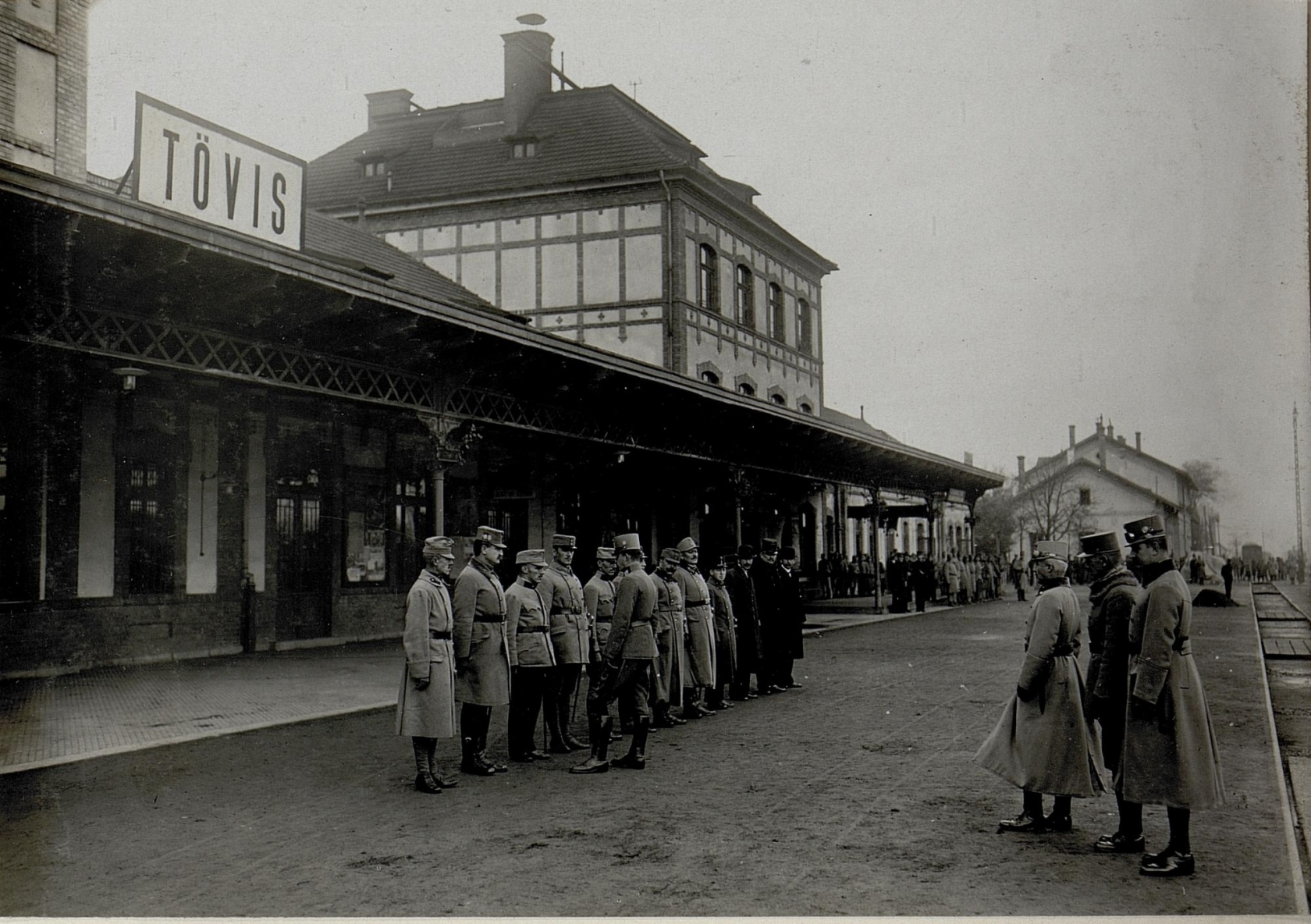
Emperor Charles I of Austria reviewing troops at Teiuș railway station in October 1916

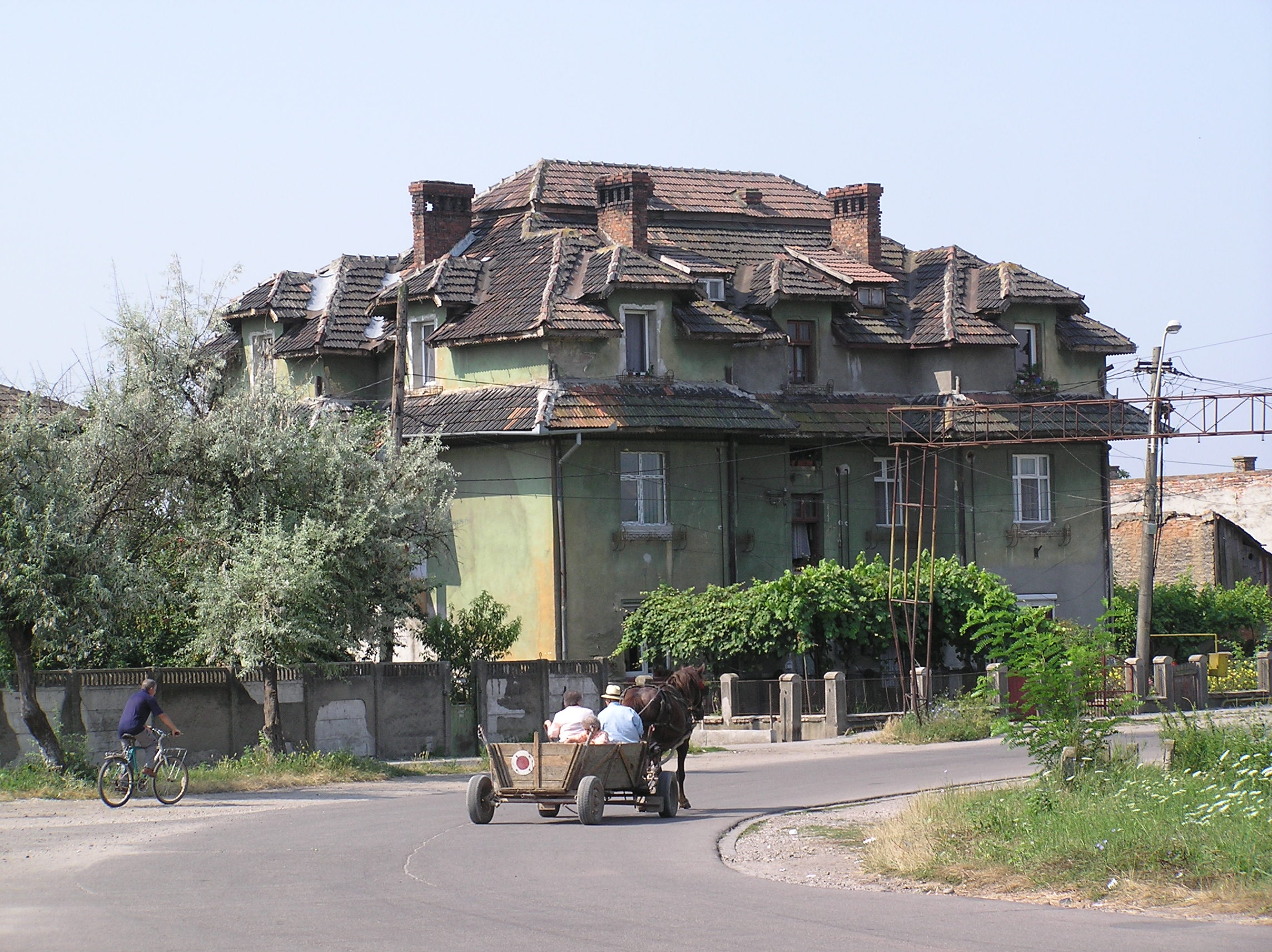
House in Teiuș near railway station

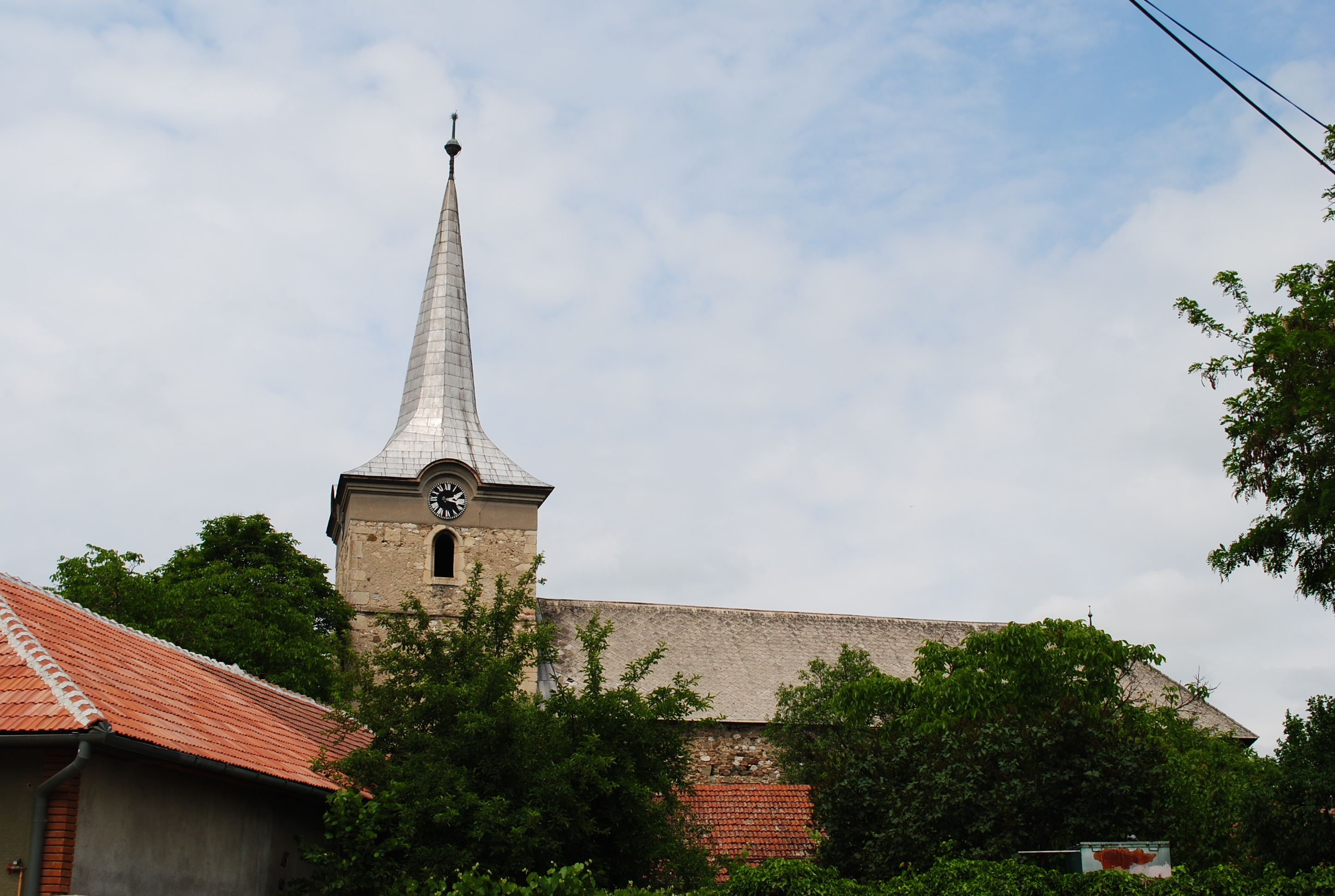
Reformed church in Teiuș

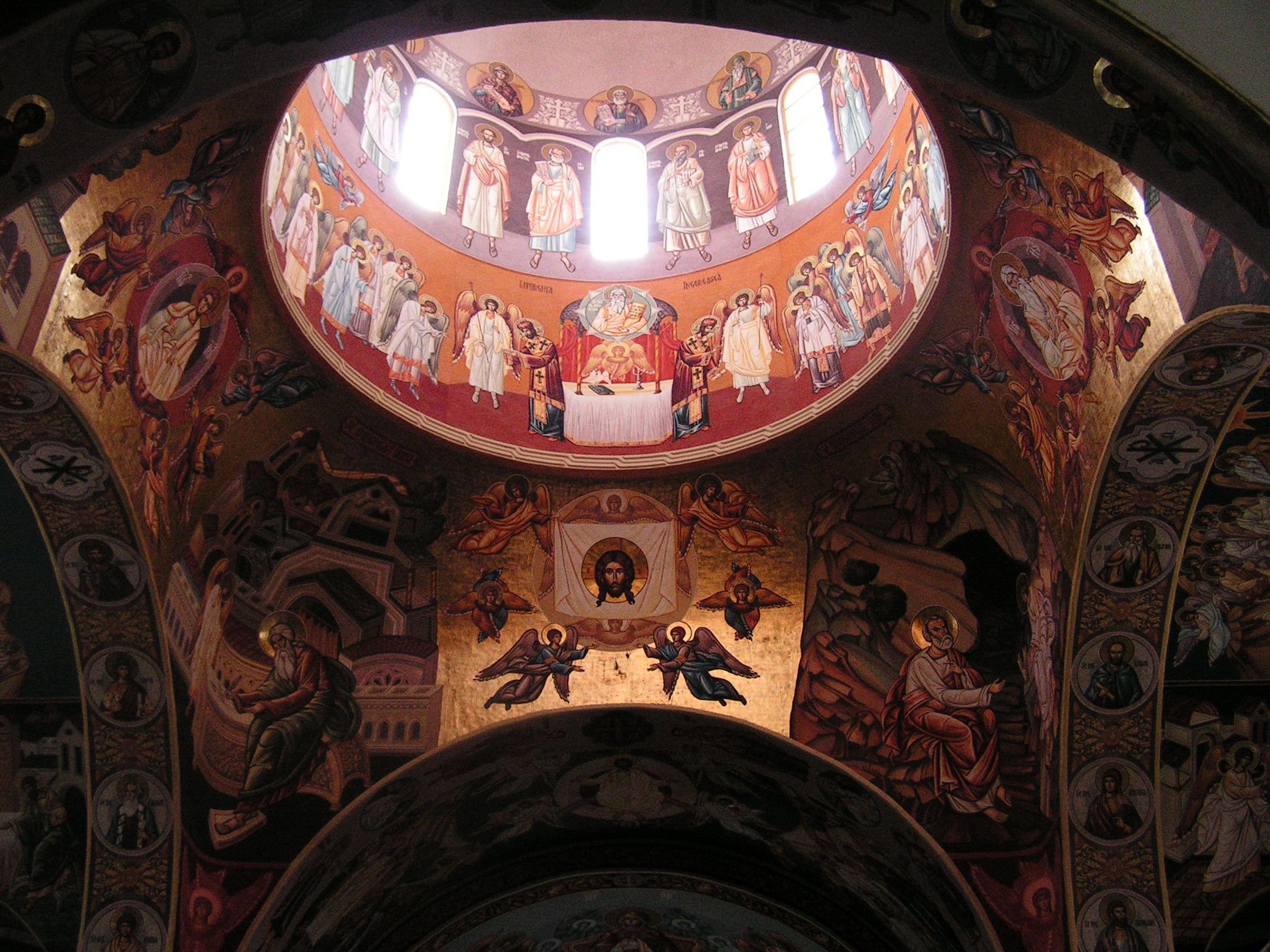
Interior of the Greek-Catholic church in Teiuș
