= Țara Moților =

Ethnogeographical region of Romania

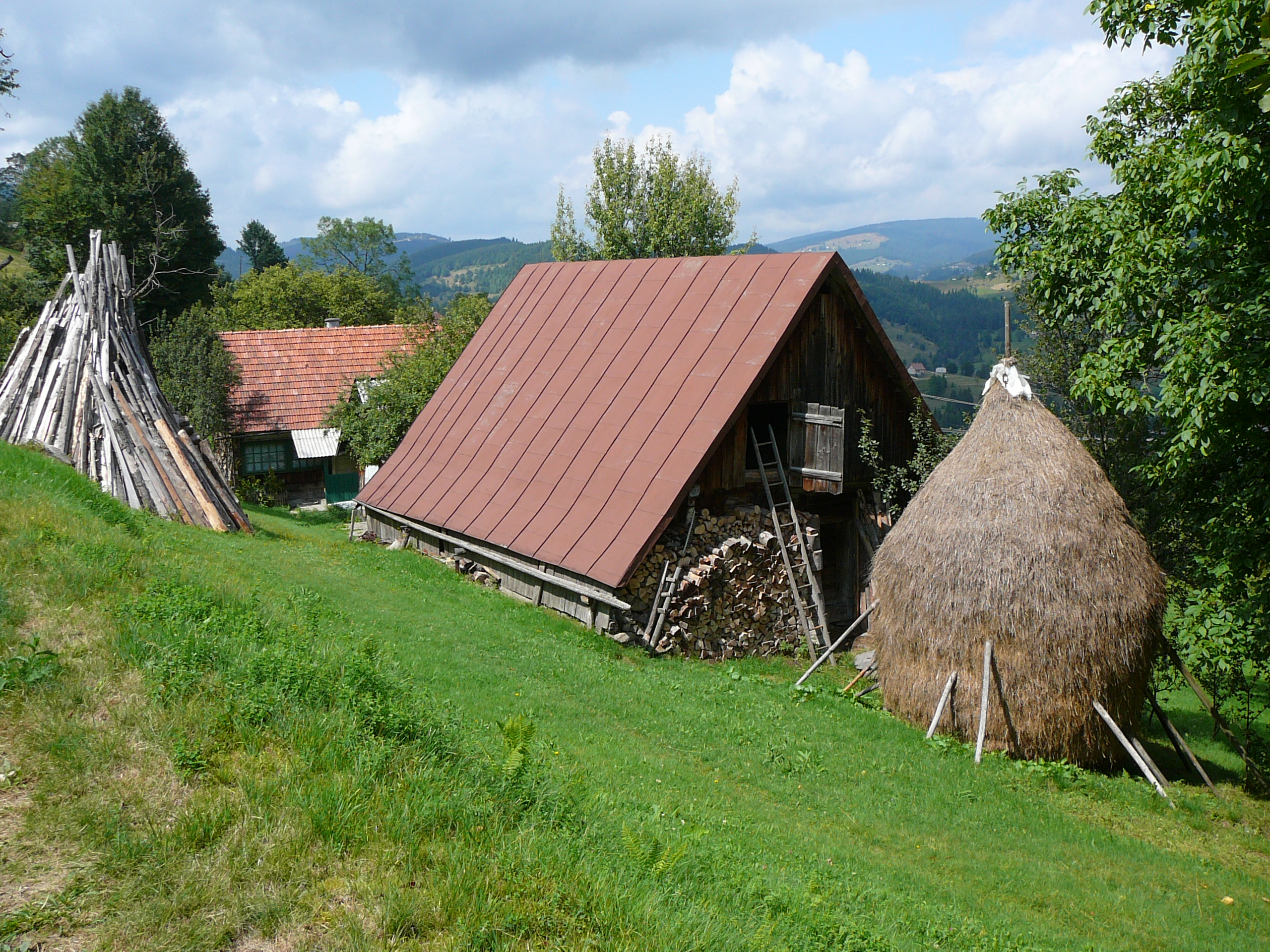
Farm in Arieșeni, Țara Moților

Țara Moților (German: Motzenland) or "The Land of Moți") is an ethnogeographical region of westerm Transylvania, Romania. Also known as Țara de Piatră ("The Stone Land"), the region is in the Apuseni Mountains, on the upper basin of the Arieș and Crișul Alb River rivers. It covers parts of the Alba, Arad, Bihor, Cluj, and Hunedoara counties of Romania and a section of it forms the Apuseni Natural Park.

Țara Moților's inhabitants are known as "moți" (German: Motzen, Hungarian: mócok). Some scholars consider the 'moți' as descendants of the Celts, because of their blonde hair and blue eyes, elements more frequent here than among other Romanians; however, the hypothesis is not accepted by mainstream historians due to its lack of consistency. Other scholars believe that they are the descendants of Slavs, for the same very reasons, or of the Alans. Yet another group of scholars consider them the descendants of Germanic tribes (the Gepids). Due to their blonde hair and blue eyes, so far seventeen theories regarding their origins have been formulated.

The moți live in scattered villages at altitudes up to about 1,400 m (4,600 ft), higher than any other permanent settlements in Romania. The 'Țara Moților' traditionally begins at Bistra, just before Câmpeni, formerly called Topani by the moți themselves or Topesdorf by the Austrians, traditionally considered the unofficial capital of the moți, while the villages down the Arieș towards Turda such as Lupșa, Sălciua, etc. are inhabited by the Mocani. The moți were also known under the name of 'țopi' (in German 'Die Zopfen'). Before the last change of the old administrative boundaries there existed an Arieș County in its own right.

== Etymology and history ==
The term "Țara" means literally "country" (cf. Latin and medieval Latin: terra); exceptionally in this case (like Țara Bârsei, Țara Oașului, Țara Făgărașului, Țara Hațegului, Țara Zarandului), it doesn't imply any political, social or administrative status. It is, instead, an archaic term referring to an enclosed and more or less isolated depression between the Carpathians. The region has a long history of resistance and fighting for political, economic, and social rights, with movements such as the Revolt of Horea, Cloșca and Crișan (1784–1785) and the Romanian component of the Transylvanian revolution of 1848 having their origins here.

== Economy ==
=== Industry ===
Logging, woodworking, and mining are the main traditional industrial activities in Țara Moților, with leather processing, blacksmith work, the miller's trade, and the manual combing and spinning of wool as secondary activities. The large oak, beech, and spruce forests provide the material for the famous artisanal barrels, furniture, and other specific items made there. Coal (at Brad), iron (at Băișoara and Iara), silver and gold (at Baia de Arieș, Bucium, Roșia Montană, Zlatna, Băița, Mușariu, Criscior), bauxite (at Vârciorog, Roșia, Dobrești, Zece Hotare), mercury (at Izvorul Ampoiului), copper, lead, zinc (at Băișa, Săcărâmb, Roșia Poieni) and molybdenum (at Băița) are all extracted here to the present day, with some of the mines (Roșia Montană) being almost 2000 years old.

=== Agriculture ===
Because of the highland conditions, the moți practice animal husbandry. Their main livestock of choice is cattle and the local highland cattle, called "Pinzgau de Transilvania", a variant of Tyrolese Pinzgau breed, was introduced by the Austrians during the 19th century. Sheep, poultry, and pig farming are a secondary choice for farmers in the area. Along south-facing mountain slopes, and along the narrow river valleys one can found scattered cultivation of potatoes, barley, and even cold-resistant vegetables.

== Tourism ==
Spring in Țara Moților

The zone is known for its folkloric traditions, landscapes, and the variation of the Karstic relief which produced over 800 natural caves such as Scărișoara, Focul Viu (both of them with surviving glaciers inside) and Peștera Urșilor (which contains fossils of Ursus spelaeus, the cave bear). Agritourism and ecotourism are also widely practiced in the area. The main winter sports center for the area is in Arieșeni.

=== A partial list of tourist attractions ===
- Apuseni Nature Park
- Avram Iancu
- Arieșeni
- Vidra
- Dealul cu Melci
- Scărișoara Cave
- Peștera Poarta lui Ionele (Ionele's Gate Cave)
- Focul Viu Cave (The Cave of the Living Fire)
- Bears' Cave
- Turda Gorge
- Cheile Gălzii (Galda Gorges)
- Cheile Ampoiței (Ampoița Gorges)
- Cheile Ordăncușii (Ordăncușa Gorges)
- The Maidens' Fair on Găina Mountain
- The Hill With Snails west of Vidra
- Barren Detunata and Shaggy Detunata (Detunatele)
- The Arieș River gorges or Cheile Albacului and Cheile Mândruțului
