= Arieș =

Arieș Aranyos
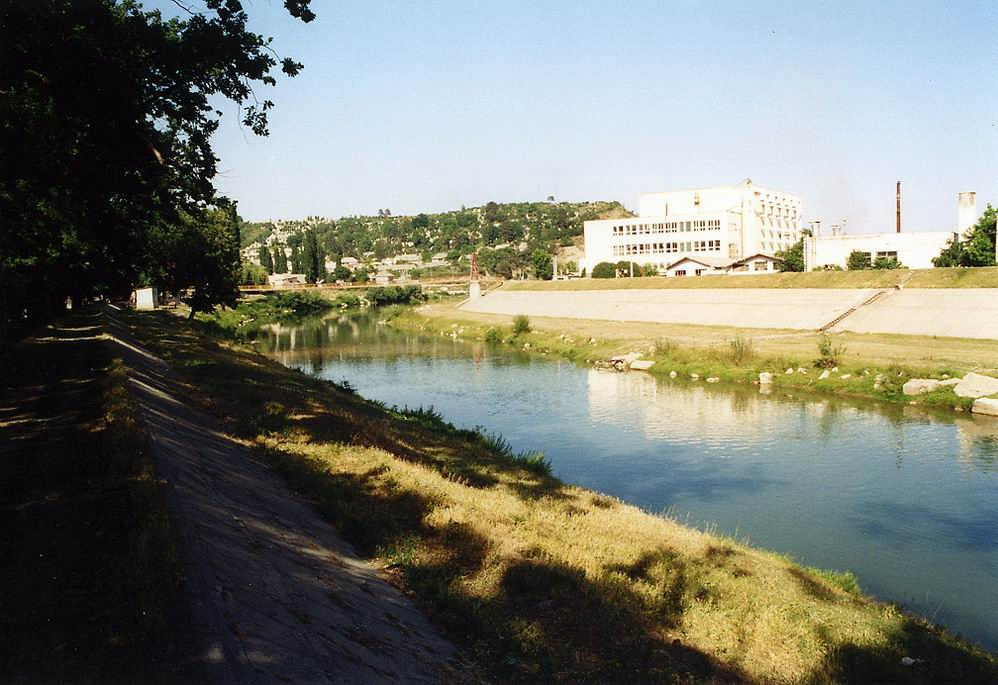
- The Arieș in Turda

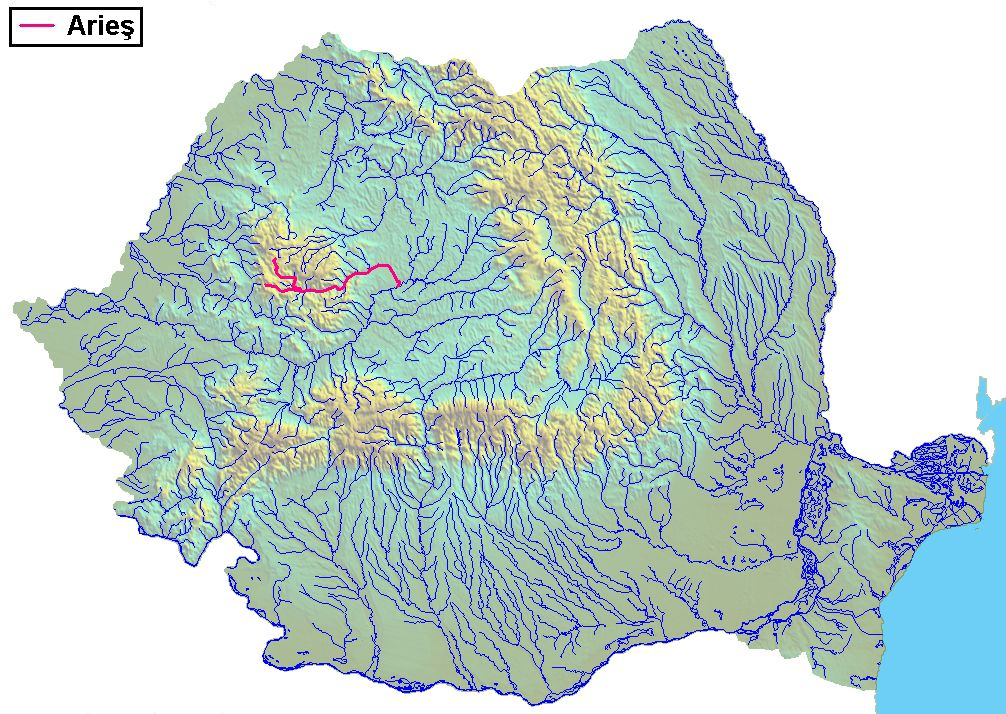

Location
- Country: Romania
- Counties: Alba, Cluj
- Towns: Turda, Câmpia Turzii

Physical characteristics
- Source: Confluence of headwaters Arieșul Mare and Arieșul Mic
  - location: Lake Mihoești
  - coordinates: 46°22′20″N 23°01′01″E
  - elevation: 570 m (1,870 ft)
- Mouth: Mureș
  - location: Gura Arieșului
  - coordinates: 46°25′45″N 23°58′38″E
  - elevation: 263 m (863 ft)
- Length: 166 km (103 mi)
- Basin size: 3,005 km^{2} (1,160 sq mi)
- Discharge
  - average: 19 m^{3}/s (670 cu ft/s)

Basin features
- Progression: Mureș→ Tisza→ Danube→ Black Sea
- Tributaries
  - left: Arieșul Mare, Iara
  - right: Arieșul Mic, Abrud

The Arieș (Hungarian: Aranyos) is a left tributary of the river Mureș in Transylvania, Romania. It discharges into the Mureș in Gura Arieșului, 11 km (6.8 mi) southwest of Luduș. Its total length (including its headwater Arieșul Mare) is 166 km (103 mi), and its drainage basin area is 3,005 km^{2} (1,160 sq mi).

Most probably "Arieș" means "Gold River", the name being derived from the Latin "Aureus". The Hungarian name "Aranyos" means "Golden" and it was first mentioned in 1177.

== Course ==
The source of the river is in the Bihor Mountains, part of the Apuseni Mountains, which translates as The Western Mountains. The Arieș is formed near the village of Mihoești at the confluence of two headwaters: Arieșul Mare and Arieșul Mic. It flows through the Alba and Cluj counties and flows into the Mureș River near the village of Gura Arieșului, which is close to the town of Luduș.

The towns of Câmpeni, Baia de Arieș, Turda, and Câmpia Turzii lie on the river Arieș. The upper valley of the river, Țara Moților, is a rustic region and a mining region (centered in Roșia Montană), rich in gold, silver and uranium. Those mines of the Metaliferi Mountains (part of the Apuseni Mountains) were exploited since Dacian times, and later on they attracted the Roman conquest.

== Towns and villages ==
The following towns and villages are situated along the river Arieș, from source to mouth: Mihoești, Gura Sohodol, Câmpeni, Boncești, Lunca Merilor, Bistra, Gârde, Lunca Largă, Pițiga, Lupșa, Hădărău, Valea Lupșii, Muncelu, Baia de Arieș, Sartăș, Brăzești, Sălciua de Jos, Poșaga de Jos, Lunca, Vidolm, Lungești, Buru, Moldovenești, Cornești, Cheia, Mihai Viteazu, Turda, Câmpia Turzii, Viișoara, Luna, Luncani, Hădăreni, Gligorești

== Tributaries ==
The following rivers are tributaries to the river Arieș (from source to mouth):

Left: Arieșul Mare, Valea Caselor (Câmpeni), Bistra, Bistrișoara, Valea Mare, Dobra, Valea Caselor (Lupșa), Lupșa, Sartăș, Sălciuța, Poșaga, Ocoliș, Ocolișel, Iara, Borzești, Hășdate, Valea Pordei, Săndulești, Valea Racilor, Aluniș, Valea Sărată, Pârâul Florilor, Valea Largă

Right: Arieșul Mic, Sohodol, Abrud, Valea Luteștilor, Ștefanca, Valea Mușcanilor, Valea Șesii, Hermăneasa, Cioara, Valea Largă, Cheia, Rimetea, Văleni, Plăiești, Bădeni, Racoșa, Valea Odăii Beteag
