= Valea Caselor =

Valea Caselor may refer to several places in Romania:

- Valea Caselor, a village in Câmpeni town, Alba County
- Valea Caselor, a village in Lipova Commune, Bacău County
- Valea Caselor, a village in Valea Mare Commune, Dâmbovița County
- Valea Caselor, a village in Drăgăşani city, Vâlcea County
- Valea Caselor, a village in Popești Commune, Vâlcea County
- Valea Caselor, tributary of the Arieș near Câmpeni, Alba County
- Valea Caselor (Lupșa), tributary of the Arieș near Lupșa, Alba County
- Valea Caselor, tributary of the Breboaia in Maramureș County
- Valea Caselor, tributary of the Dâmbovița in Argeș County
- Valea Caselor, tributary of the Homorod in Brașov County
- Valea Caselor, tributary of the Iza in Maramureș County
- Valea Caselor (Sebeș), tributary of the Sebeș in Sibiu County
- Valea Caselor, tributary of the Someșul Mare in Bistrița-Năsăud County
- Valea Caselor, tributary of the Valchid in Sibiu County
