= Furduiești =

Furduieşti may refer to several villages in Romania:

- Furduieşti, a village in the town of Câmpeni, Alba County
- Furduieşti, a village in Sohodol Commune, Alba County
