= Bistrișoara =

- Location within Romania

Location
- Country: Romania
- Counties: Alba County
- Villages: Cheleteni, Bistra

Physical characteristics
- Mouth: Arieș
  - location: Bistra
  - coordinates: 46.3755°N 23.0974°E
- Length: 13 km (8.1 mi)
- Basin size: 22 km^{2} (8.5 sq mi)

Basin features
- Progression: Arieș→ Mureș→ Tisza→ Danube→ Black Sea

The Bistrișoara is a left tributary of the Arieș in Romania. It flows into the Arieș in Bistra. Its length is 13 km (8.1 mi) and its basin size is 22 km^{2} (8.5 sq mi).
