= Valea Șesii =

Valea Șesii may refer to several places in Romania:

- Valea Șesii, a village in Bucium Commune, Alba County
- Valea Șesii, a village in Lupșa Commune, Alba County
- Valea Șesii (Arieș), a tributary of the Arieș in Alba County
- Valea Șesii, a tributary of the Iaz in Sălaj County
