= Bistra (Arieș) =

Valea Bistrii
- Location within Romania

Location
- Country: Romania
- Counties: Alba County

Physical characteristics
- Mouth: Arieș
  - location: Boncești
  - coordinates: 46.3683°N 23.0835°E
- Length: 18 km (11 mi)
- Basin size: 43 km^{2} (17 sq mi)

Basin features
- Progression: Arieș→ Mureș→ Tisza→ Danube→ Black Sea

The Valea Bistrii is a left tributary of the river Arieș in Romania. It discharges into the Arieș in Boncești, near Câmpeni. Its length is 18 km (11 mi) and its basin size is 43 km^{2} (17 sq mi).
