= Valea Mare (Arieș) =

- Location within Romania

Location
- Country: Romania
- Counties: Alba County
- Villages: Poiana, Hodișești, Ciuldești

Physical characteristics
- Source: Muntele Mare
  - elevation: 1,798 m (5,899 ft)
- Mouth: Arieș
  - location: Bistra
  - coordinates: 46.3755°N 23.0975°E
  - elevation: 531 m (1,742 ft)
- Length: 19 km (12 mi)
- Basin size: 69 km^{2} (27 sq mi)

Basin features
- Progression: Arieș→ Mureș→ Tisza→ Danube→ Black Sea
- Tributaries
  - left: Neagu
  - right: Valea Denei

The Valea Mare is a left tributary of the river Arieș in Romania. It flows into the Arieș in Bistra. Its length is 19 km (12 mi) and its basin size is 69 km^{2} (27 sq mi).
