= Valea Șesii (Arieș) =

Valea Șesii Valea Șesei
- Location within Romania

Location
- Country: Romania
- Counties: Alba
- Villages: Vința, Bârzan

Physical characteristics
- Mouth: Arieș
  - location: Valea Șesii
  - coordinates: 46.3763°N 23.2334°E
- Length: 10 km (6.2 mi)
- Basin size: 38 km^{2} (15 sq mi)

Basin features
- Progression: Arieș→ Mureș→ Tisza→ Danube→ Black Sea

The Valea Șesii or Valea Șesei is a right tributary of the river Arieș in Romania. It flows into the Arieș near Baia de Arieș. The Valea Șesii dam is built on this river. Its length is 10 km (6.2 mi) and its basin size is 38 km^{2} (15 sq mi).
