= Sohodol (Arieș) =

- Location within Romania

Location
- Country: Romania
- Counties: Alba County
- Villages: Sohodol

Physical characteristics
- Mouth: Arieș
  - location: Gura Sohodol
  - coordinates: 46.3574°N 23.0293°E
- Length: 10 km (6.2 mi)
- Basin size: 41 km^{2} (16 sq mi)

Basin features
- Progression: Arieș→ Mureș→ Tisza→ Danube→ Black Sea
- Tributaries
  - right: Poiana

The Sohodol is a right tributary of the river Arieș in Romania. It discharges into the Arieș in Gura Sohodol. Its length is 10 km (6.2 mi) and its basin size is 41 km^{2} (16 sq mi).

== Etymology ==
"Sohodol" is a common noun of Slavic origin literally meaning "dry valley", with the connotation of being located in a karstic limestone area. It is a compound of soh ("dry, arid") and dol ("creek, ditch, valley").
