= Bobărești =

Bobăreşti may refer to several villages in Romania:

- Bobăreşti, a village in Sohodol Commune, Alba County
- Bobăreşti, a village in Vidra Commune, Alba County
