= Cioara (Arieș) =

- Location within Romania

Location
- Country: Romania
- Counties: Alba County
- Villages: Cioara de Sus

Physical characteristics
- Mouth: Arieș
  - location: Baia de Arieș
  - coordinates: 46.3825°N 23.2826°E
- Length: 9 km (5.6 mi)
- Basin size: 26 km^{2} (10 sq mi)

Basin features
- Progression: Arieș→ Mureș→ Tisza→ Danube→ Black Sea

The Cioara is a right tributary of the river Arieș in Romania. It discharges into the Arieș in Baia de Arieș. Its length is 9 km (5.6 mi) and its basin size is 26 km^{2} (10 sq mi).
