= Valeriu Moldovan =

Romanian lawyer and politician

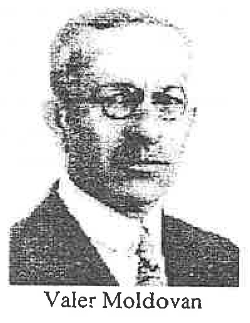
Romanian politician and lawyer Valer Moldovan, deputy in the Great National Assembly of Alba Iulia, Romania, 1918

Valeriu A. Moldovan (August 5, 1875—July 19, 1954) was an Austro-Hungarian-born Romanian lawyer and politician.

A native of Câmpeni in Transylvania's Alba County, his parents were the lawyer Anania Moldovan and Ludovica (née Stwertecky); the family was Romanian Orthodox. He attended primary school in Turda, followed by gymnasium in Brașov and Blaj and the Lutheran high school in Sibiu. His last years of high school were spent in Brașov, and he graduated there in 1894. With an Emanoil Gojdu scholarship, he was able to study law at the University of Budapest and then at Franz Joseph University in Cluj (Kolozsvár). Moldovan graduated from the latter institution, which accorded him the title of doctor. He moved to Turda in 1903, opening a law office. From 1911 to 1914, he was deeply involved in newspaper writing. In 1910, he was elected as one of 25 members belonging to the executive committee of the Romanian National Party (PNR). He fought in World War I.

A prominent advocate of the union of Transylvania with Romania, he became secretary of the province's Directing Council once this took place in 1918. He taught at the revamped University of Cluj's law faculty, offering courses on canon law starting in 1928 and being assigned a professorate in the field in 1930. In 1933, he began teaching Romanian law, and followed up with administrative law in 1934. After the PNR merged with the Peasants' Party, he joined the National Peasants' Party (PNȚ). Between 1928 and 1930, when the party was in government, he was a state secretary at the Education and Religious Affairs Ministry. In addition, he served in Parliament, first as a Deputy and then as a Senator, initially for the PNR and then for the PNȚ. He was awarded the rank of Commander in the Order of the Star of Romania.

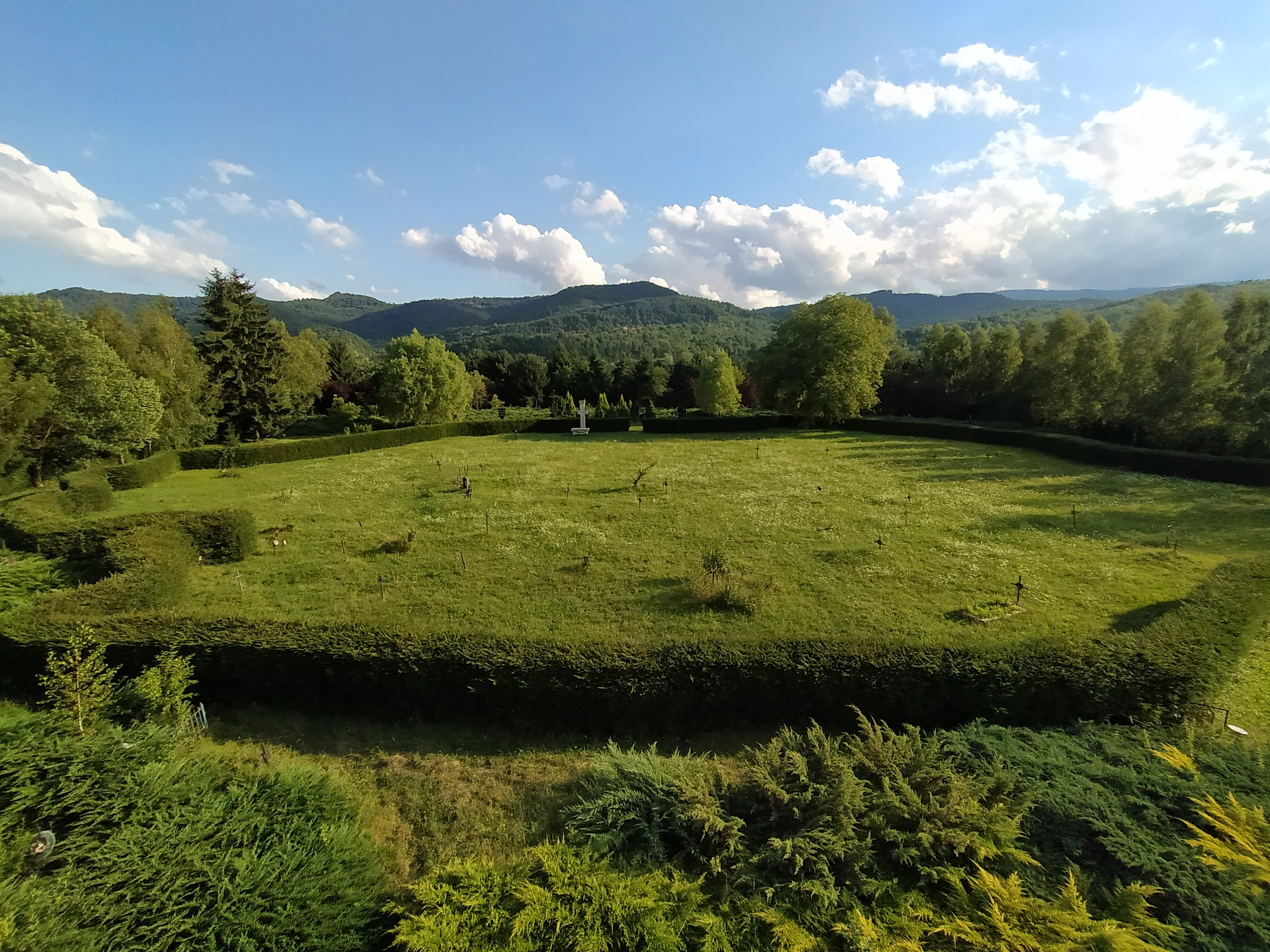
Paupers Cemetery in Sighetu Marmației

Arrested in May 1950 by the early communist regime, he was sent to Sighet Prison, where he was repeatedly beaten. He died four years later while still incarcerated, and was buried in the Paupers Cemetery (also known as Cearda) in Sighetu Marmației. A street in Turda now bears his name.
