= Valea Caselor (Lupșa) =

- Location within Romania

Location
- Country: Romania
- Counties: Alba County
- Villages: Lupșa

Physical characteristics
- Mouth: Arieș
  - location: Lupșa
  - coordinates: 46.3658°N 23.2062°E
- Length: 9 km (5.6 mi)
- Basin size: 21 km^{2} (8.1 sq mi)

Basin features
- Progression: Arieș→ Mureș→ Tisza→ Danube→ Black Sea

The Valea Caselor is a left tributary of the river Arieș in Romania. It flows into the Arieș in Lupșa. Its length is 9 km (5.6 mi) and its basin size is 21 km^{2} (8.1 sq mi).
