= Pârâul Florilor =

- Location within Romania

Location
- Country: Romania
- Counties: Cluj County
- Villages: Boj-Cătun, Valea Florilor, Ploscoș

Physical characteristics
- Source: Boj-Cătun
  - coordinates: 46°42′09″N 23°48′54″E
  - elevation: 440 m (1,440 ft)
- Mouth: Arieș
  - location: near Câmpia Turzii
  - coordinates: 46°33′49″N 23°52′32″E
  - elevation: 300 m (980 ft)
- Length: 19 km (12 mi)
- Basin size: 64 km^{2} (25 sq mi)

Basin features
- Progression: Arieș→ Mureș→ Tisza→ Danube→ Black Sea

The Pârâul Florilor is a small river in Cluj County, western Romania. It is a left tributary of the river Arieș. It flows through the villages of Boj-Cătun, Valea Florilor and Ploscoș, and joins the Arieș opposite Câmpia Turzii. Its length is 19 km (12 mi) and its basin size is 64 km^{2} (25 sq mi). A reach of the Câmpia Turzii - Cluj railway follows the course of the Pârâul Florilor.
