= Hoancă =

Hoancă may refer to several villages in Romania:

- Hoancă, a village in Sohodol Commune, Alba County
- Hoancă, a village in Vidra Commune, Alba County
