= Dric =

Dric may refer to:

- Dric, a village in Câmpeni Town, Alba County, Romania
- Detroit River International Crossing, a new bridge between Canada and the United States of America
