= Vadpatak =

Vadpatak is the Hungarian name for two villages in Romania:

- Valea Vadului village, Iara Commune, Cluj County (Vádpatak)
- Băteşti village, Făget Town, Timiș County (Vadpatak)
