= Ocolișel =

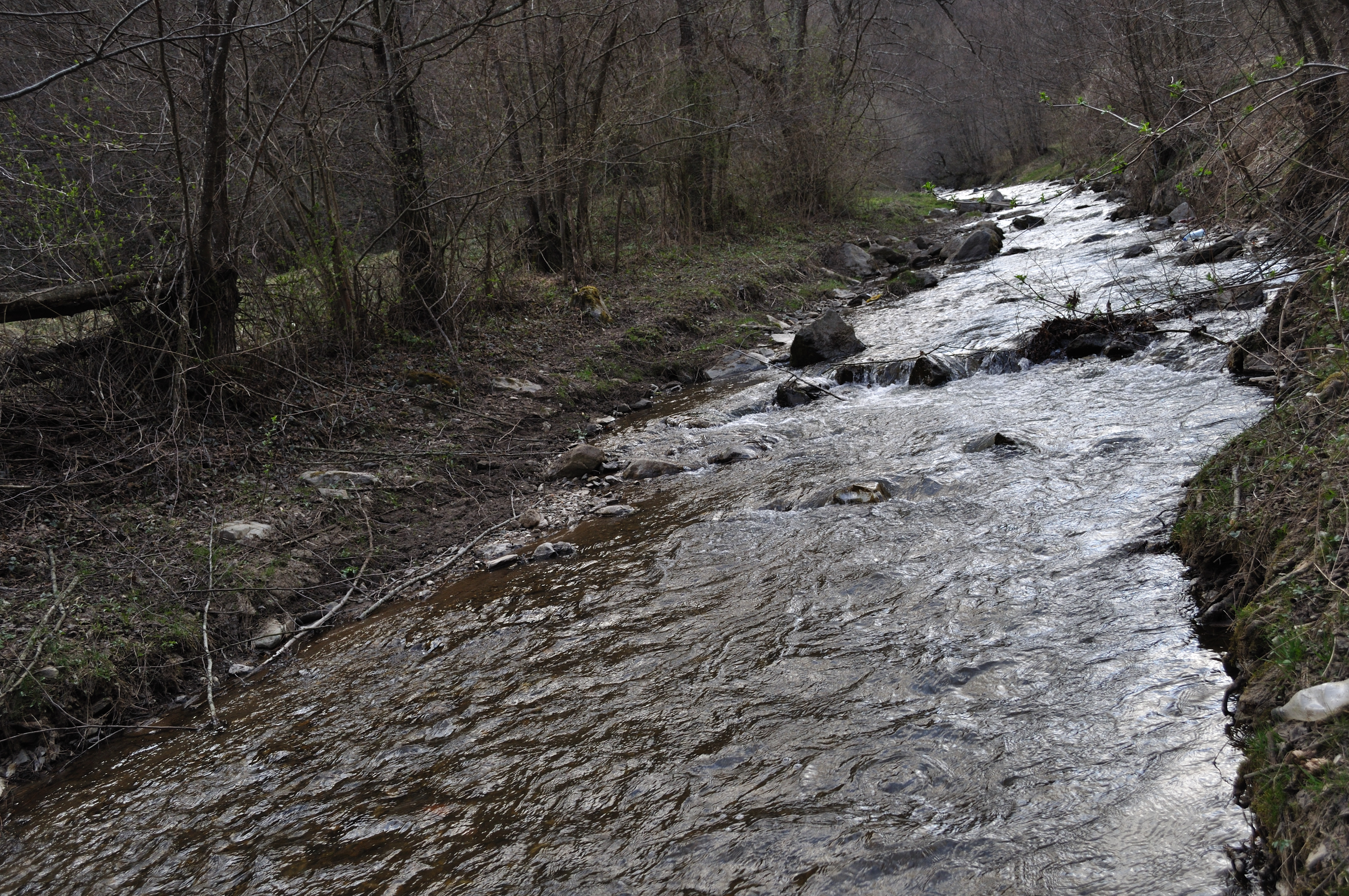
- The Ocolișel River

- Location within Romania

Location
- Country: Romania
- Counties: Cluj County
- Villages: Valea Vadului, Ocolișel

Physical characteristics
- Source: Mount Bușcat
  - coordinates: 46°31′41″N 23°16′43″E
  - elevation: 1,515 m (4,970 ft)
- Mouth: Arieș
  - location: Lungești
  - coordinates: 46°29′57″N 23°31′50″E
  - elevation: 387 m (1,270 ft)
- Length: 25 km (16 mi)
- Basin size: 51 km^{2} (20 sq mi)

Basin features
- Progression: Arieș→ Mureș→ Tisza→ Danube→ Black Sea

The Ocolișel is a small river in the Apuseni Mountains, Cluj County, western Romania. It is a left tributary of the river Arieș. It flows through the commune of Iara, and joins the Arieș near the village Lungești. In its upper course it is also called Vad or Valea Vadului. Its length is 25 km (16 mi) and its basin size is 51 km^{2} (20 sq mi).
