= Plăiești =

- Location within Romania

Location
- Country: Romania
- Counties: Cluj County
- Villages: Plăiești

Physical characteristics
- Mouth: Arieș
  - location: Cheia
  - coordinates: 46.5328°N 23.7078°E
- Length: 11 km (6.8 mi)
- Basin size: 29 km^{2} (11 sq mi)

Basin features
- Progression: Arieș→ Mureș→ Tisza→ Danube→ Black Sea

The Plăiești is a right tributary of the river Arieș in Romania. It discharges into the Arieș near Cornești. Its length is 11 km (6.8 mi) and its basin size is 29 km^{2} (11 sq mi).
