= Văleni River =

Văleni River may refer to the following rivers in Romania:

- Văleni (Arieș) - tributary of the Arieș in Cluj County
- Văleni - tributary of the Câlneș in Neamț County
- Văleni (Iza) - a tributary of the Iza in Maramureș County
- Văleni - tributary of the Mureș
