= Valea Sărată =

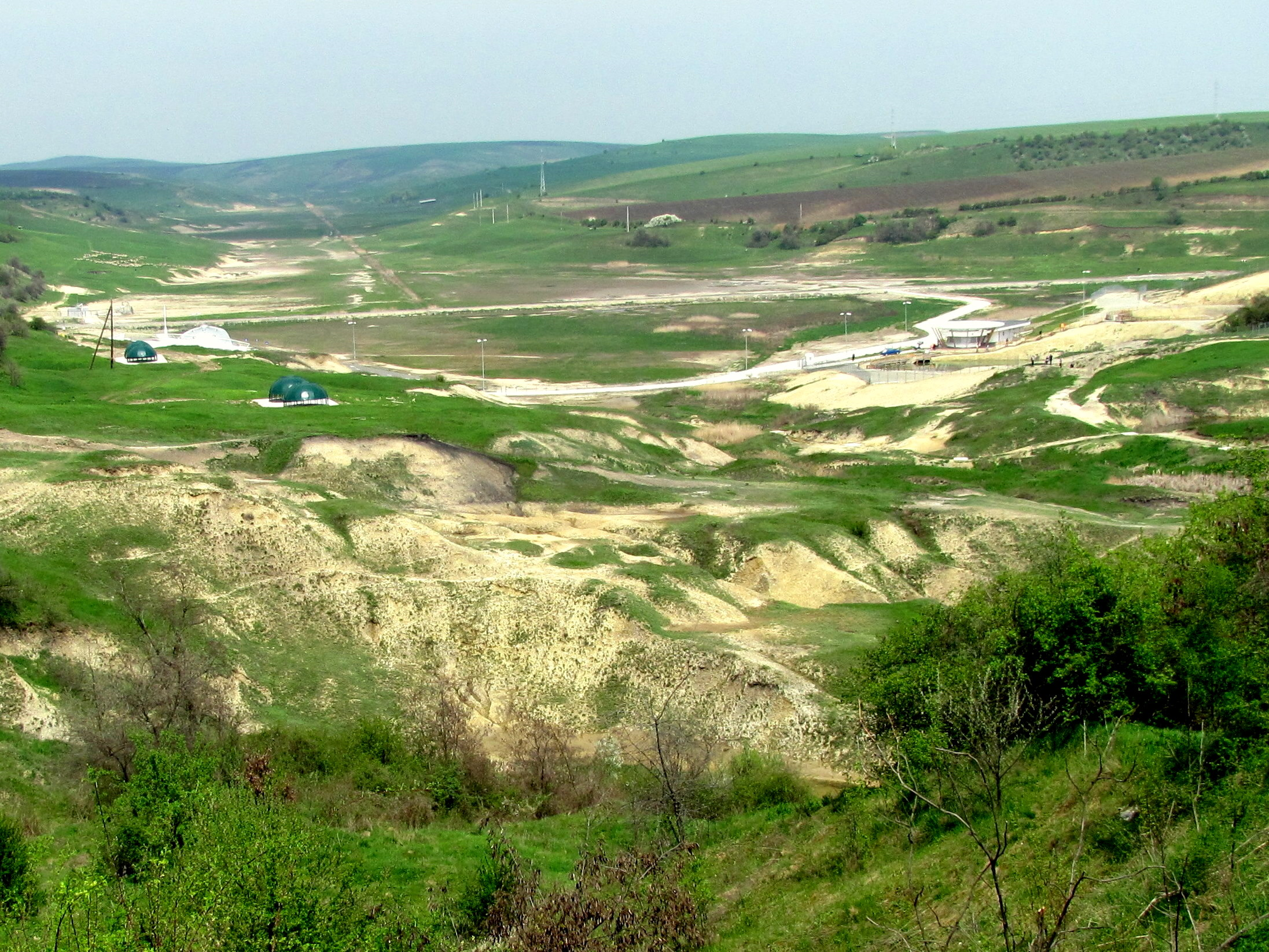

- Location within Romania

Location
- Country: Romania
- Counties: Cluj County
- Villages: Băile Turda

Physical characteristics
- Mouth: Arieș
  - coordinates: 46.5702°N 23.8400°E
- Length: 8 km (5.0 mi)
- Basin size: 22 km^{2} (8.5 sq mi)

Basin features
- Progression: Arieș→ Mureș→ Tisza→ Danube→ Black Sea

The Valea Sărată is a left tributary of the river Arieș in Romania. It discharges into the Arieș near Turda. Its length is 8 km (5.0 mi) and its basin size is 22 km^{2} (8.5 sq mi).
