= Detunatele =

Geological site in Romania

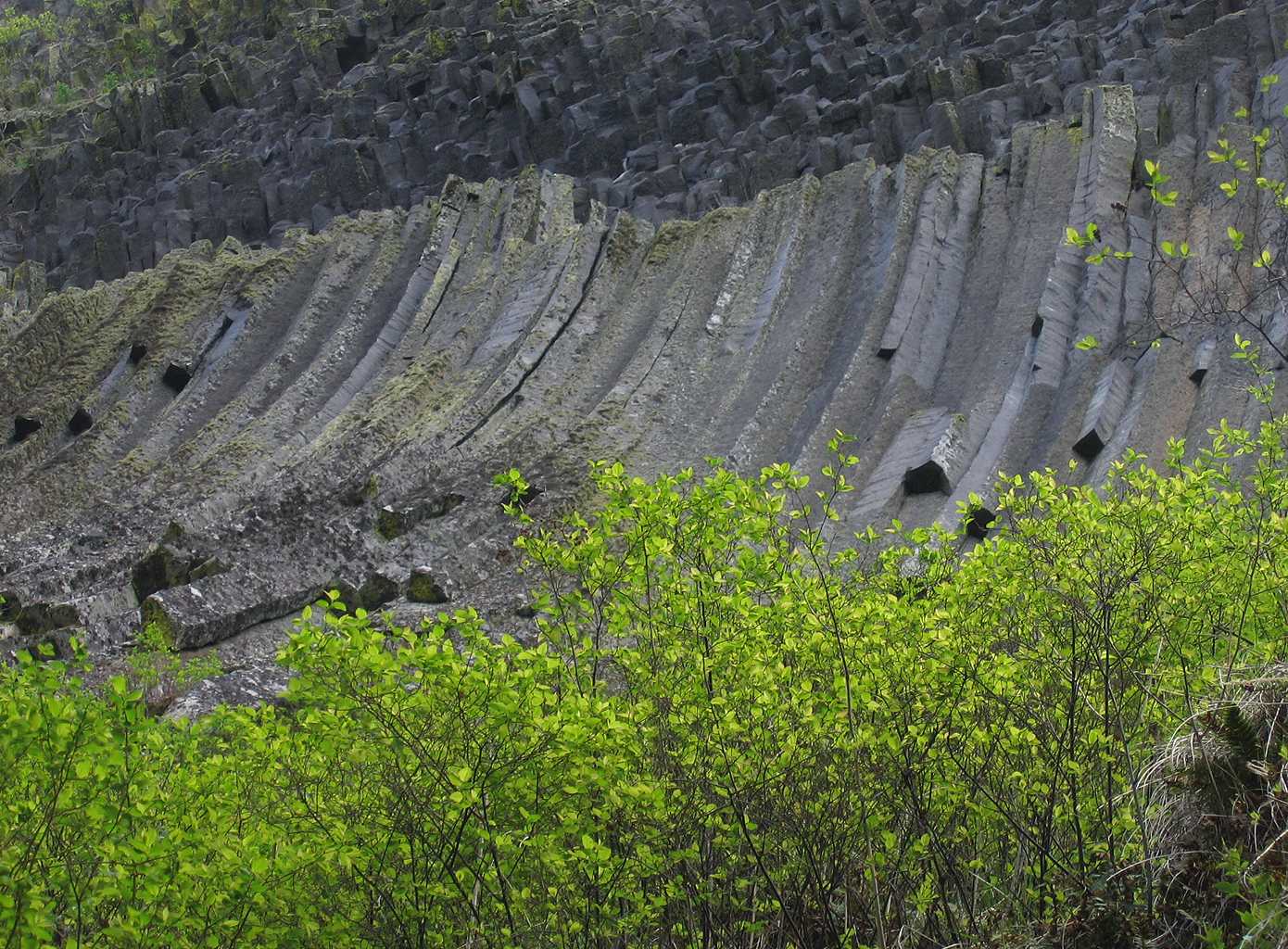
Detunata Goală

Detunatele is a site of columnar jointing in Alba County, Transylvania, Romania. Detunatele means lightning struck. The hexagonal columns are made of basalt and are 1,258 metres (4,127 ft) tall on two peaks: Detunata Goală and Detunata Flocoasă (Barren Detunata and Shaggy Detunata).

The two peaks are located in the Metaliferi Mountains and are a tourist attraction. They are 1.5 km (0.93 mi) apart. The formations are shaped like humps and there are stories and legends associated with them. They are considered to be two of the most beautiful peaks in the Apuseni Mountains.
