= Lupșa =

- Commune
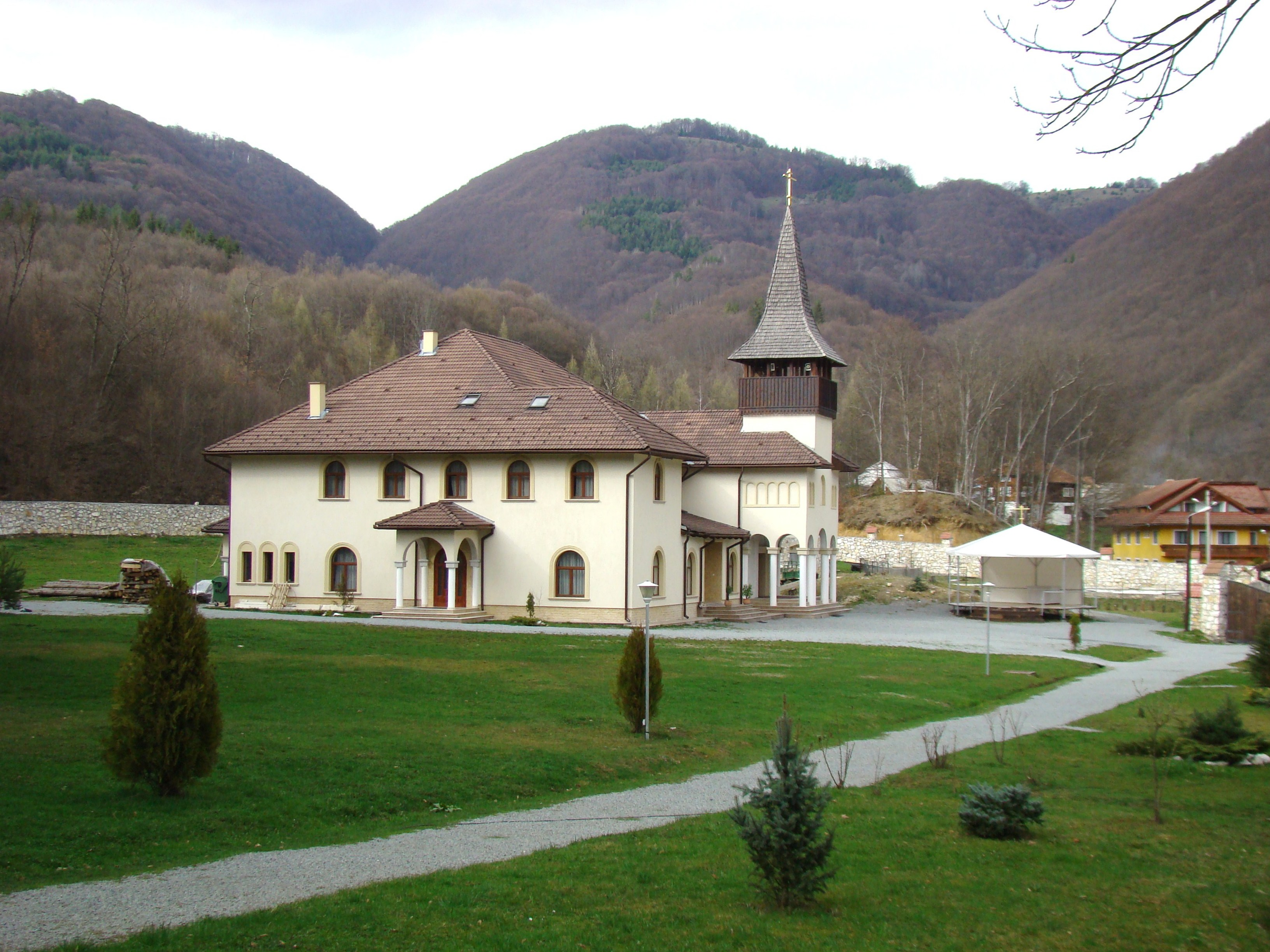
- Lupșa Orthodox monastery

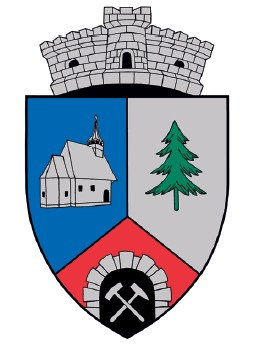
- Coat of arms

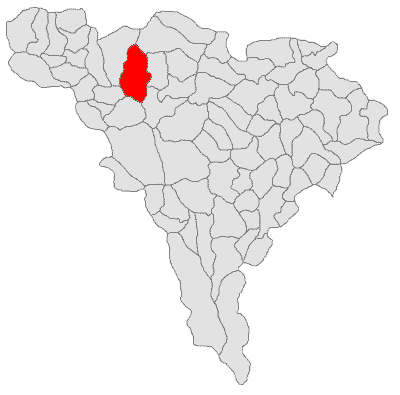
- Location in Alba County

- Location in Romania
- Coordinates: 46°22′N 23°12′E
- Country: Romania
- County: Alba

Government
  - Mayor (2020–2024): Ioan-Radu Penciu (USR PLUS)
- Area: 103.6 km^{2} (40.0 sq mi)
- Elevation: 568 m (1,864 ft)
- Highest elevation: 1,350 m (4,430 ft)
- Lowest elevation: 550 m (1,800 ft)
- Population (2021-12-01): 2,732
  - Density: 26.37/km^{2} (68.30/sq mi)
- Time zone: UTC+02:00 (EET)
  - Summer (DST): UTC+03:00 (EEST)
- Postal code: 517410
- Area code: (+40) 02 58
- Vehicle reg.: AB
- Website: www.primarialupsa.ro

Lupșa (German: Wolfsdorf; Hungarian: Nagylupsa) is a commune located in Alba County, Transylvania, Romania. It is composed of 23 villages: Bârdești, Bârzan, Curmătură, După Deal, Geamăna, Hădărău, Holobani, Lazuri, Lunca, Lupșa, Mănăstire, Mărgaia, Mușca, Pârâu-Cărbunări, Pițiga, Poșogani, Șasa, Trifești, Văi, Valea Holhorii, Valea Lupșii, Valea Șesii, and Vința.

The commune is located in Țara Moților, on the slopes of Muntele Mare to the north and the Metaliferi Mountains to the south. The area has a specific mountain relief developed on crystalline schists and metalliferous rocks. It ranges in height between 550 m (1,800 ft) in the meadows of the river Arieș (which traverses it for 19 km) to 1,350 m (4,430 ft) in Geamăna. Lupșa is on the DN75 Turda–Câmpeni national road, 95 km (59 mi) from Alba Iulia, the county seat, 15 km from the city of Câmpeni, and 9 km from Baia de Arieș, the nearest town.

In 1978, the communist regime opened the Roșia Poieni copper mine near Geamăna, which at the time had over 1,000 residents. In 1986, production from the mine caused the formation of a muddy lake, which gradually submerged almost the entire village. By 2015, at most 15 people remained. The main objective is a partly submerged church, which has become a tourist attraction.
