= Ploscoș =

- Commune
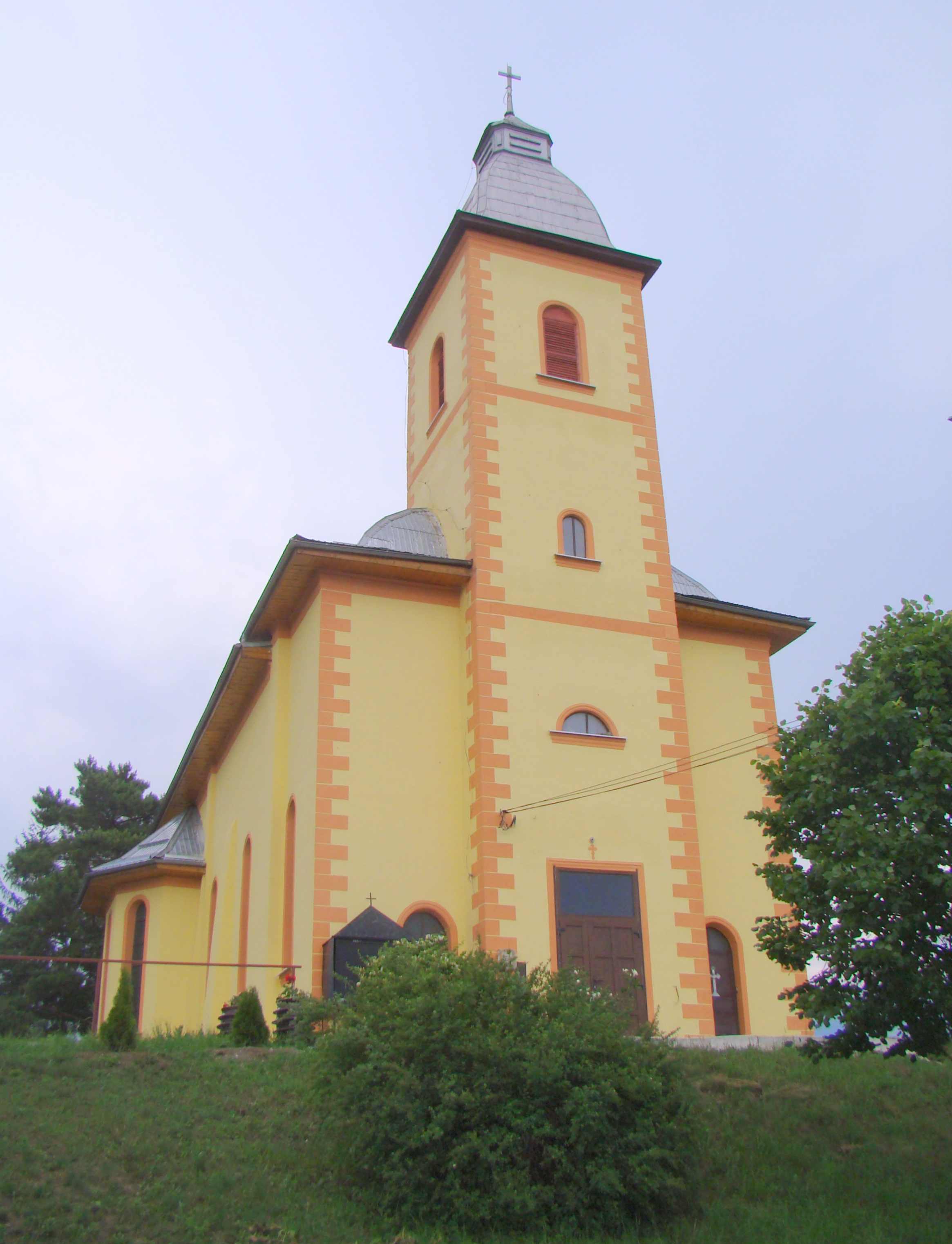
- Saint Nicholas church in Ploscoș

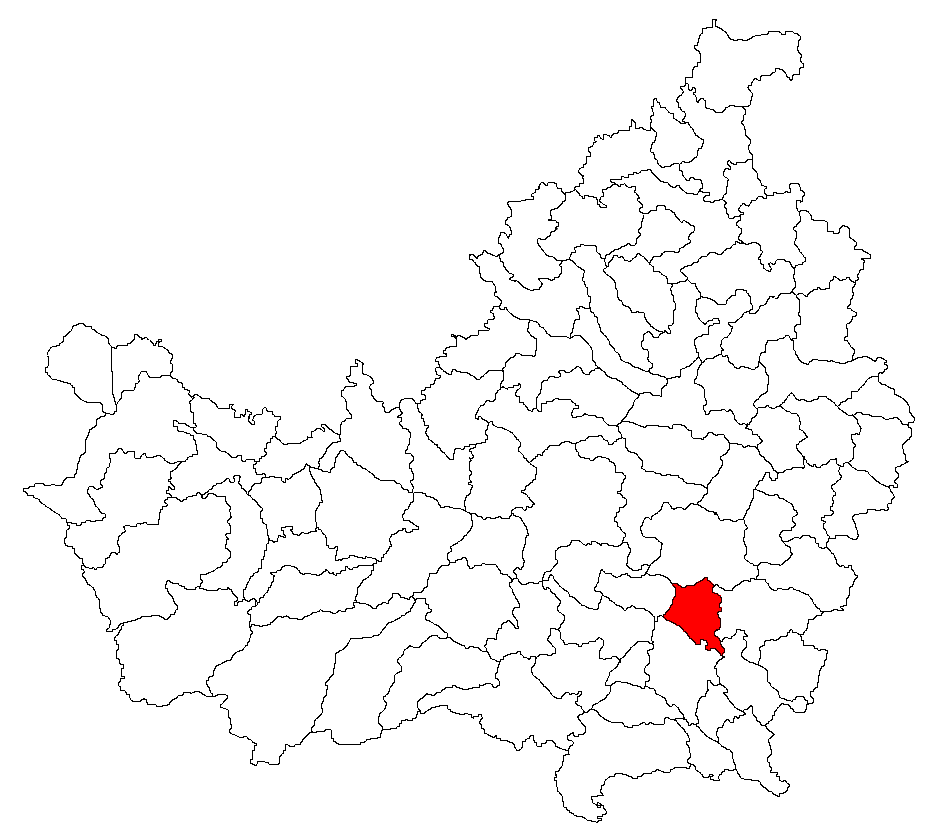
- Location in Cluj County

- Location in Romania
- Coordinates: 46°39′N 23°50′E
- Country: Romania
- County: Cluj
- Subdivisions: Crairât, Lobodaș, Ploscoș, Valea Florilor

Government
  - Mayor (2024–2028): Ioan-Daniel Aitoneanu (PSD)
- Area: 41.66 km^{2} (16.09 sq mi)
- Elevation: 345 m (1,132 ft)
- Population (2021-12-01): 540
  - Density: 13/km^{2} (34/sq mi)
- Time zone: UTC+02:00 (EET)
  - Summer (DST): UTC+03:00 (EEST)
- Postal code: 407465
- Area code: (+40) 0264
- Vehicle reg.: CJ
- Website: comunaploscos.ro

Ploscoș (Hungarian: Palackos) is a commune in Cluj County, Transylvania, Romania. It is composed of four villages: Crairât (Királyrét), Lobodaș (Labodás), Ploscoș, and Valea Florilor (Virágosvölgy).

== Demographics ==
Historical population
Year	Pop.	±%
1956	2,316	—
1966	2,291	−1.1%
1977	1,613	−29.6%
1992	862	−46.6%
2002	797	−7.5%
2011	677	−15.1%
2021	540	−20.2%
Source: Census data

According to the census from 2011, there were 677 people living in this commune; of this population, 98.08% were ethnic Romanians and 1.92% ethnic Roma. At the 2021 census, Ploscoș had a population of 540, of which 89.26% were Romanians.
