= Văleni (Arieș) =

- Location within Romania

Location
- Country: Romania
- Counties: Cluj County
- Villages: Moldovenești

Physical characteristics
- Mouth: Arieș
  - coordinates: 46.5160°N 23.6753°E
- Length: 13 km (8.1 mi)
- Basin size: 31 km^{2} (12 sq mi)

Basin features
- Progression: Arieș→ Mureș→ Tisza→ Danube→ Black Sea

The Văleni (also: Pietroasa) is a right tributary of the river Arieș in Romania. It discharges into the Arieș near Moldovenești. Its length is 13 km (8.1 mi) and its basin size is 31 km^{2} (12 sq mi).
