= Mihai Viteazu, Cluj =

Mihai Viteazu
- Commune
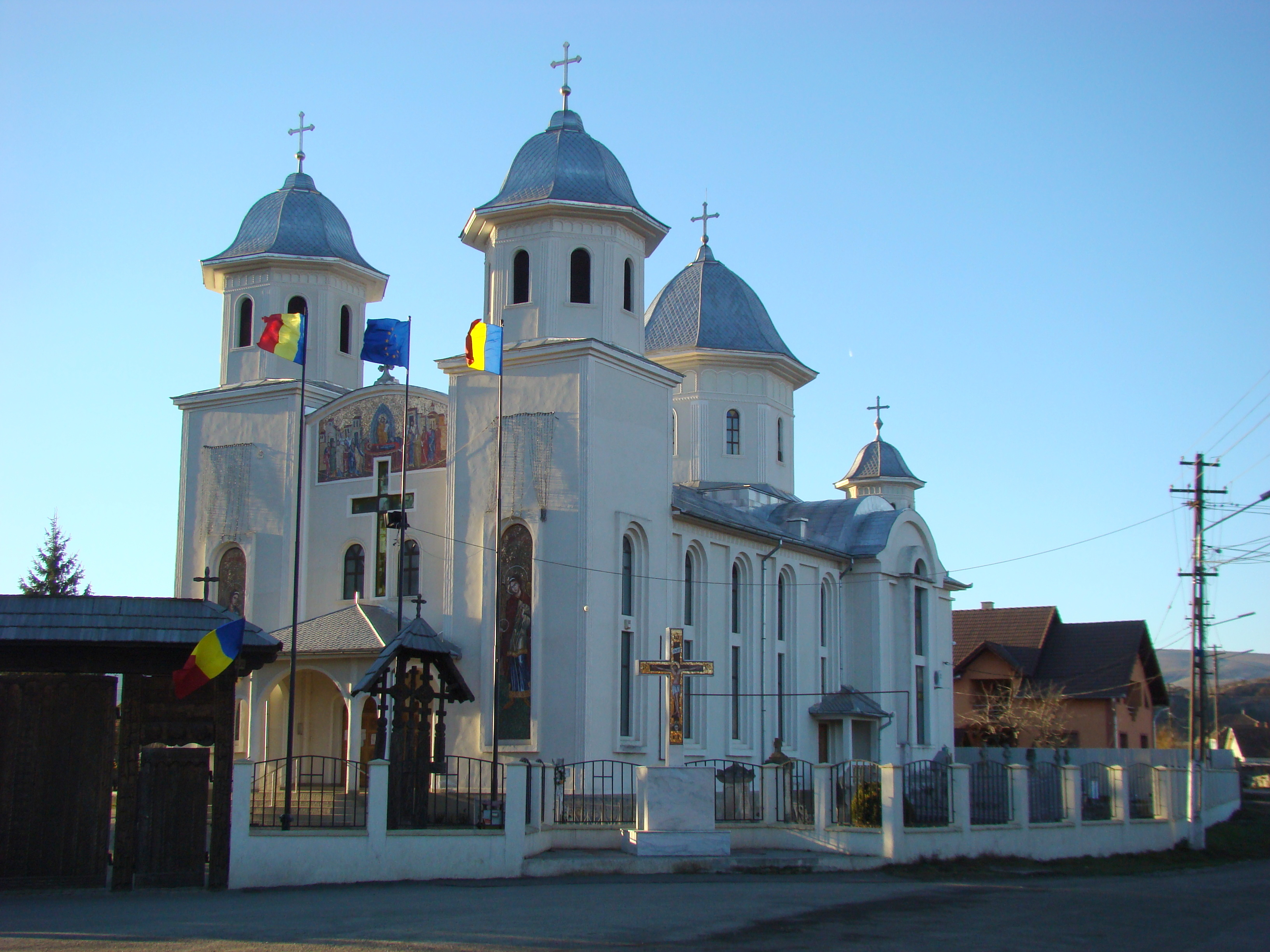
- Church of the Assumption in Mihai Viteazu

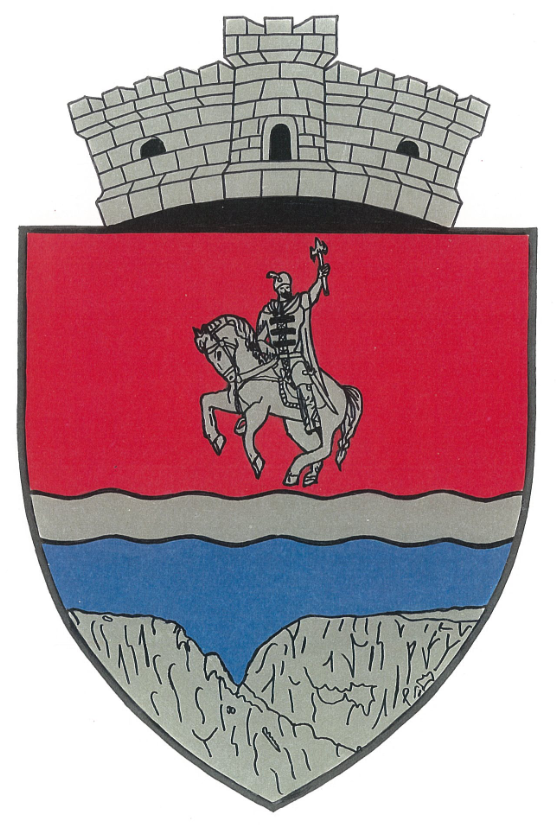
- Coat of arms

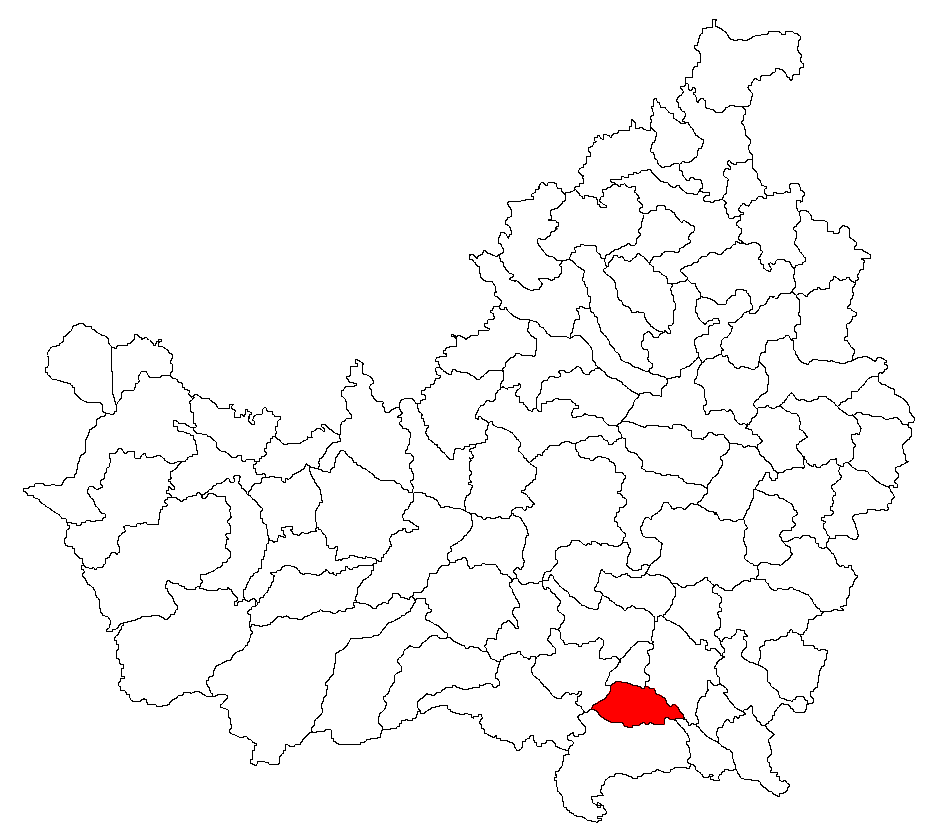
- Location in Cluj County

- Location in Romania
- Coordinates: 46°32′29″N 23°44′50″E
- Country: Romania
- County: Cluj
- Subdivisions: Cheia, Cornești, Mihai Viteazu

Government
  - Mayor (2024–2028): Paul-Cristian Olaru (PNL)
- Area: 47.53 km^{2} (18.35 sq mi)
- Elevation: 331 m (1,086 ft)
- Population (2021-12-01): 5,575
  - Density: 117.3/km^{2} (303.8/sq mi)
- Time zone: UTC+02:00 (EET)
  - Summer (DST): UTC+03:00 (EEST)
- Postal code: 407405
- Area code: +(40) x64
- Vehicle reg.: CJ
- Website: primariamihaiviteazu.ro

Mihai Viteazu (archaic: Sânmihaiu; Hungarian: Szentmihály; German: Michelsdorf) is a commune in Cluj County, Transylvania, Romania. It is composed of three villages: Cheia (Mészkő), Cornești (Sinfalva), and Mihai Viteazu.

Mihai Viteazu village, which is named after the medieval ruler Michael the Brave (Romanian: Mihai Viteazu), was founded in 1925 by the merging of two villages, Sânmihaiu de Jos (Alsószentmihály) and Sânmihaiu de Sus (Felsőszentmihály). Those two, together with Cornești and Cheia, were first mentioned in documents in the 14th century, after the settlement of Székelys in the Aranyos Seat area. However, archaeologists unearthed traces of human dwellings from earlier periods, too.

The commune covers an area of 47.53 square kilometres (18.35 square miles). The most interesting sight of the area is the Turda Gorge (Cheile Turzii).

== Demography ==
Historical population
Year	Pop.	±%
1850	3,229	—
1880	2,889	−10.5%
1890	3,447	+19.3%
1900	3,514	+1.9%
1910	3,579	+1.8%
1920	3,764	+5.2%
1930	4,204	+11.7%
1941	4,162	−1.0%
1956	3,949	−5.1%
1966	4,954	+25.4%
1977	6,043	+22.0%
1992	5,604	−7.3%
2002	5,749	+2.6%
2011	5,270	−8.3%
2021	5,575	+5.8%
Source: Census data

At the 2002 census, the commune had 5,423 inhabitants, of which 71.2% were Romanians, 27.4% Hungarians, and 1.3% Roma; 66.6% were Romanian Orthodox, 13.8% Unitarian, 10.1% Reformed, 4% Roman Catholic, 2.4% belonged to another religion, and 0.9% Pentecostal. Ar the 2021 census, Mihai Viteazu had a population of 5,575; of those, 73.7% were Romanians, 18.17% Hungarians, and 1.29% Roma.

== Natives ==
- Ion Cârja (1922–1977), anti-Communist dissident, writer
- Oliviu Gherman (1930–2020), physicist and politician
