= Bistra, Alba =

Bistra
- Commune
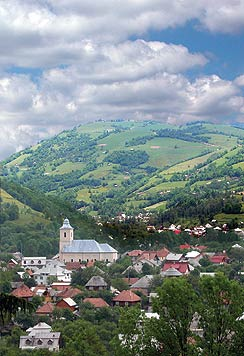
- View of Bistra

- Coat of arms

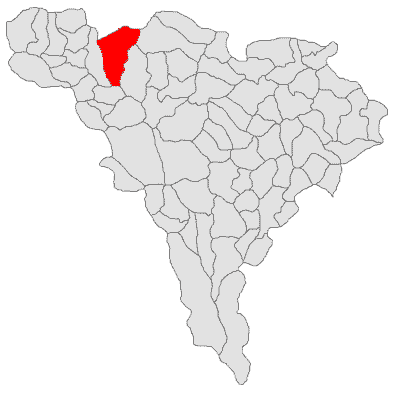
- Location in Alba County

- Location in Romania
- Coordinates: 46°23′N 23°6′E
- Country: Romania
- County: Alba

Government
  - Mayor (2020–2024): Traian Gligor (PNL)
- Area: 118.38 km^{2} (45.71 sq mi)
- Elevation: 556 m (1,824 ft)
- Population (2021-12-01): 4,340
  - Density: 36.7/km^{2} (95.0/sq mi)
- Time zone: UTC+02:00 (EET)
  - Summer (DST): UTC+03:00 (EEST)
- Postal code: 517115
- Area code: +40 x58
- Vehicle reg.: AB
- Website: bistra.ro

Bistra (German: Bistrau; Hungarian: Bisztra) is a commune located in Alba County, Transylvania, Romania. It has a population of 4,340 as of 2021. It is composed of 35 villages: Aronești, Bălești, Bălești-Cătun, Bârlești, Bistra, Cheleteni, Ciuldești, Crețești, Dâmbureni, Dealu Muntelui, Durăști, Gănești, Gârde, Hodișești, Hudricești, Lipaia, Lunca Largă, Lunca Merilor, Mihăiești, Nămaș, Novăcești, Perjești, Poiana, Poiu, Rătitiș, Runcuri, Sălăgești, Ștefanca, Țărănești, Tolăcești, Tomnatec, Trișorești, Vârși-Rontu, Vârșii Mari, and Vârșii Mici.

The commune is situated in the northwest corner of Alba County. It covers a surface of 138 km^{2} (53 sq mi) (about 1.8% of the total area of the county), making it the largest commune in Romania by surface area. Bistra is crossed from West to East for a length of 7 km (4.3 mi) by the Arieș River. It is surrounded to the SE by the Trascău Mountains, the SW by the Metaliferi Mountains and to the NE by the Gilău Mountains, with Muntele Mare as the highest peak, at 1,826 m (5,991 ft).

Historical population
Year	Pop.	±%
1850	3,140	—
1900	3,755	+19.6%
1930	4,501	+19.9%
1966	5,576	+23.9%
1977	5,688	+2.0%
2002	5,066	−10.9%
2011	4,540	−10.4%
2021	4,340	−4.4%
Source: INS, Census data

== Natives ==
- Petru Pavel Aron (1709–1764), Bishop of Făgăraș and Primate of the Romanian Greek Catholic Church
