= Iara, Cluj =

Iara
- Commune
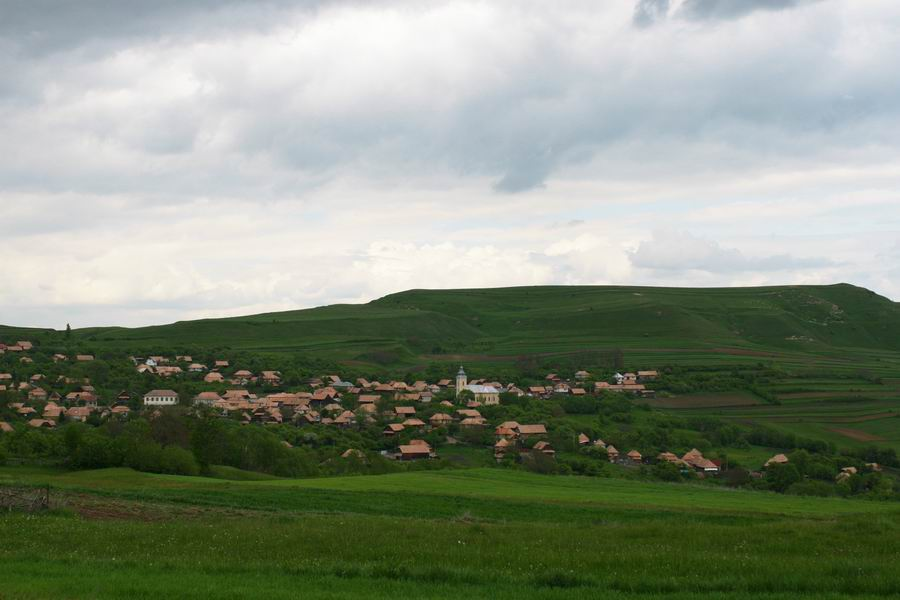
- View of the village of Agriș

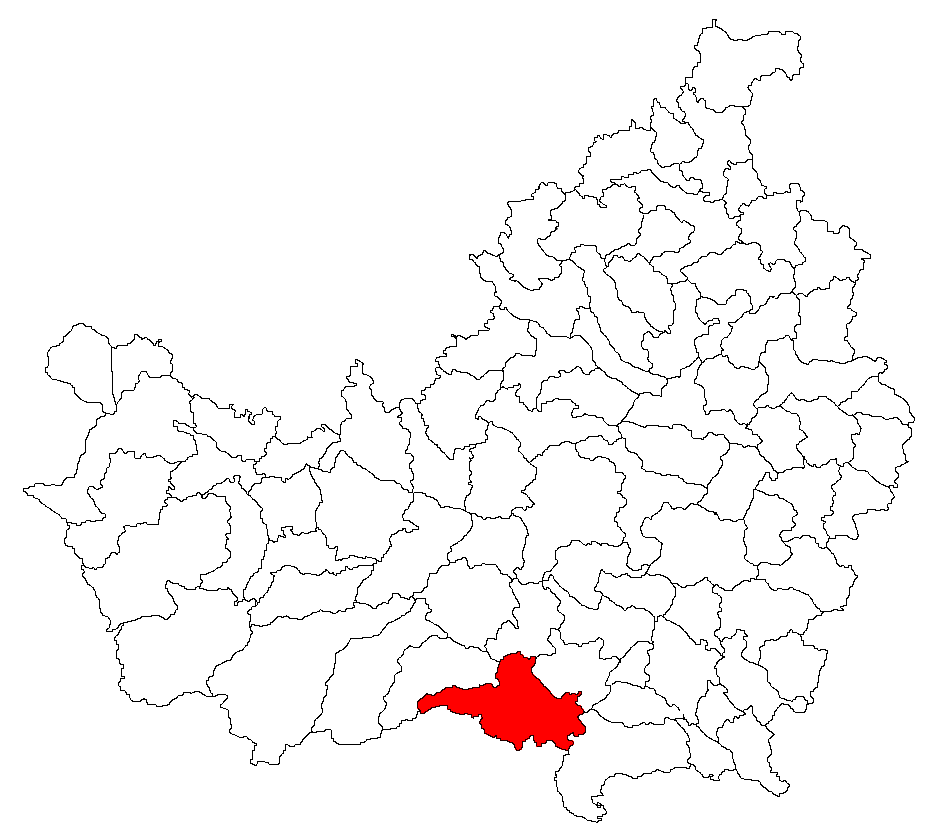
- Location in Cluj County

- Location in Romania
- Coordinates: 46°33′11″N 23°31′04″E
- Country: Romania
- County: Cluj
- Established: 1176
- Subdivisions: Agriș, Borzești, Buru, Cacova Ierii, Făgetu Ierii, Iara, Lungești, Măgura Ierii, Mașca, Ocolișel, Surduc, Valea Agrișului, Valea Vadului

Government
  - Mayor (2020–2024): Ioan Dorin Popa (PNL)
- Area: 143.87 km^{2} (55.55 sq mi)
- Elevation: 465 m (1,526 ft)
- Population (2021-12-01): 3,577
  - Density: 24.86/km^{2} (64.39/sq mi)
- Time zone: UTC+02:00 (EET)
  - Summer (DST): UTC+03:00 (EEST)
- Postal code: 407315
- Area code: +(40) 0264
- Vehicle reg.: CJ
- Website: primariaiara.ro

Iara (Hungarian: Alsójára; German: Jahren) is a commune in the southern part of Cluj County, Transylvania, Romania. It is composed of thirteen villages: Agriș (Ruhaegres), Borzești (Berkes), Buru (Borrév), Cacova Ierii (Aranyosivánfalva), Făgetu Ierii (Bikalat), Iara, Lungești (Szurdoklunzsest), Măgura Ierii (Járamagura), Mașca (Macskakő), Ocolișel (Felsőaklos), Surduc (Járaszurdok), Valea Agrișului (Egrespatak), and Valea Vadului (Vádpatak).

== Demographics ==
According to the census from 2002, the commune had a population of 4,704, of which 90.68% were ethnic Romanians, 6.01% ethnic Roma, and 3.16% ethnic Hungarians. At the 2021 census, Iara had a population of 3,577; of those, 83.45% were Romanians and 6.96% Roma.
