= Sohodol =

- Commune
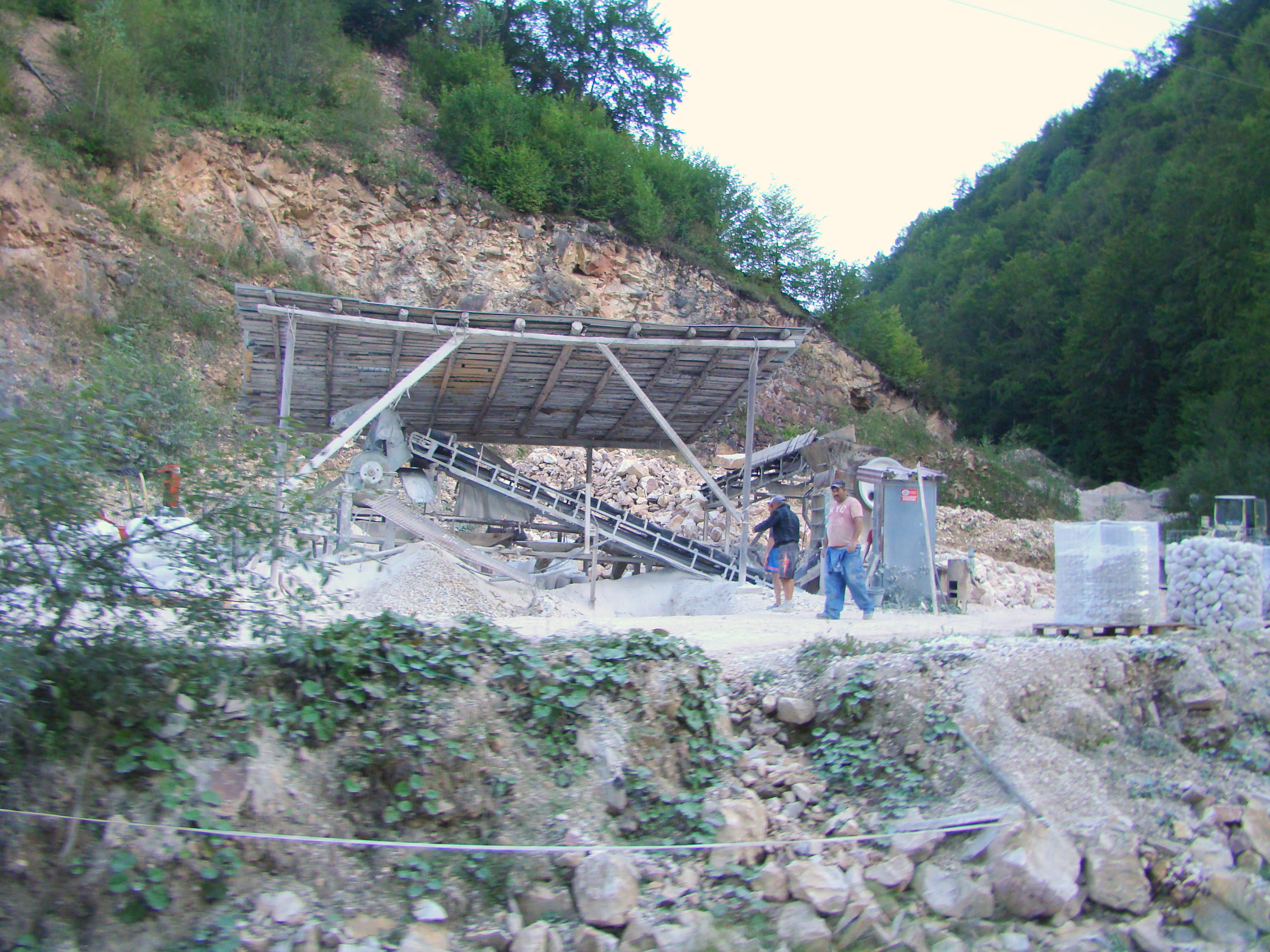
- Stone quarry in Sohodol

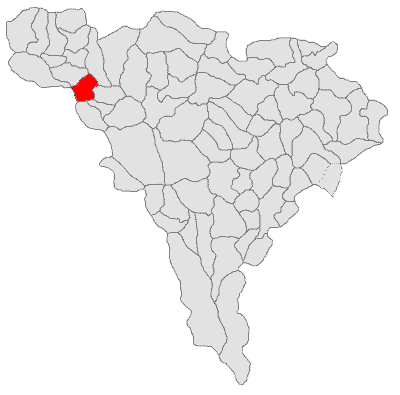
- Location in Alba County

- Location in Romania
- Coordinates: 46°20′14″N 23°0′37″E
- Country: Romania
- County: Alba

Government
  - Mayor (2020–2024): Sorin-Constantin Corcheș (PNL)
- Area: 65 km^{2} (25 sq mi)
- Elevation: 620 m (2,030 ft)
- Population (2021-12-01): 1,540
  - Density: 24/km^{2} (61/sq mi)
- Time zone: UTC+02:00 (EET)
  - Summer (DST): UTC+03:00 (EEST)
- Postal code: 517700
- Area code: (+40) 02 58
- Vehicle reg.: AB
- Website: primariasohodol.ro

Sohodol (Hungarian: Aranyosszohodol) is a commune located in Alba County, Transylvania, Romania. It is composed of thirty-one villages: Băzești, Bilănești, Bobărești, Brădeana, Burzonești, Deoncești, Dilimani, Furduiești, Gura Sohodol, Hoancă, Joldișești, Lazuri, Lehești, Luminești, Medrești, Morărești, Munești, Năpăiești, Nelegești, Nicorești, Peleș (Peles), Poiana (Pojén), Robești, Sebișești, Sicoiești, Șimocești, Sohodol, Surdești, Țoci, Valea Verde, and Vlădoșești.

The commune is located in the northwestern part of Alba County, some 75 km (47 mi) from the county seat, Alba Iulia, on the border with Hunedoara County. It is situated at an altitude of 620 m (2,030 ft), at the foot of the Bihor Mountains, in the heart of the Apuseni Mountains. County road DJ750A connects Sohodol to Câmpeni, 5 km (3.1 mi) to the northeast.

== Etymology ==
"Sohodol" is a common noun of Slavic origin literally meaning "dry valley", with the connotation of being located in a karstic limestone area. It is a compound of soh ("dry, arid") and dol ("creek, ditch, valley").

Historical population
Year	Pop.	±%
1850	3,281	—
1880	3,948	+20.3%
1900	4,642	+17.6%
1920	4,708	+1.4%
1930	4,793	+1.8%
1941	4,253	−11.3%
1966	3,396	−20.2%
1977	3,088	−9.1%
1992	2,371	−23.2%
2002	2,085	−12.1%
2011	1,729	−17.1%
2021	1,540	−10.9%
Source: INS, Census data
