= Baia de Arieș =

- Town
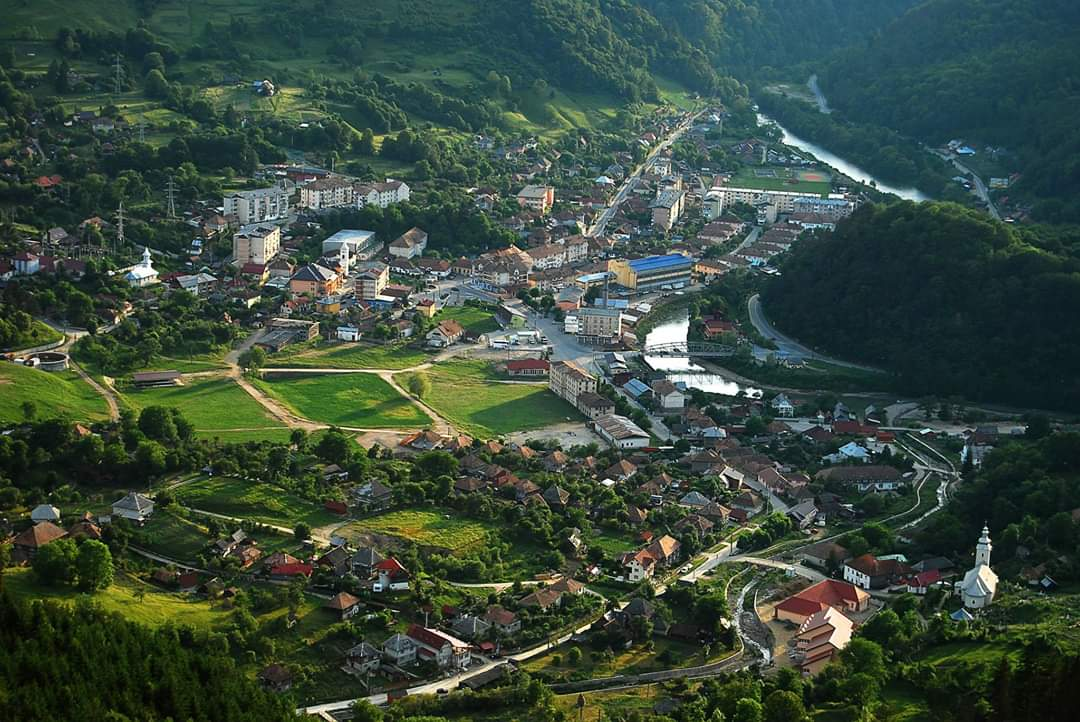

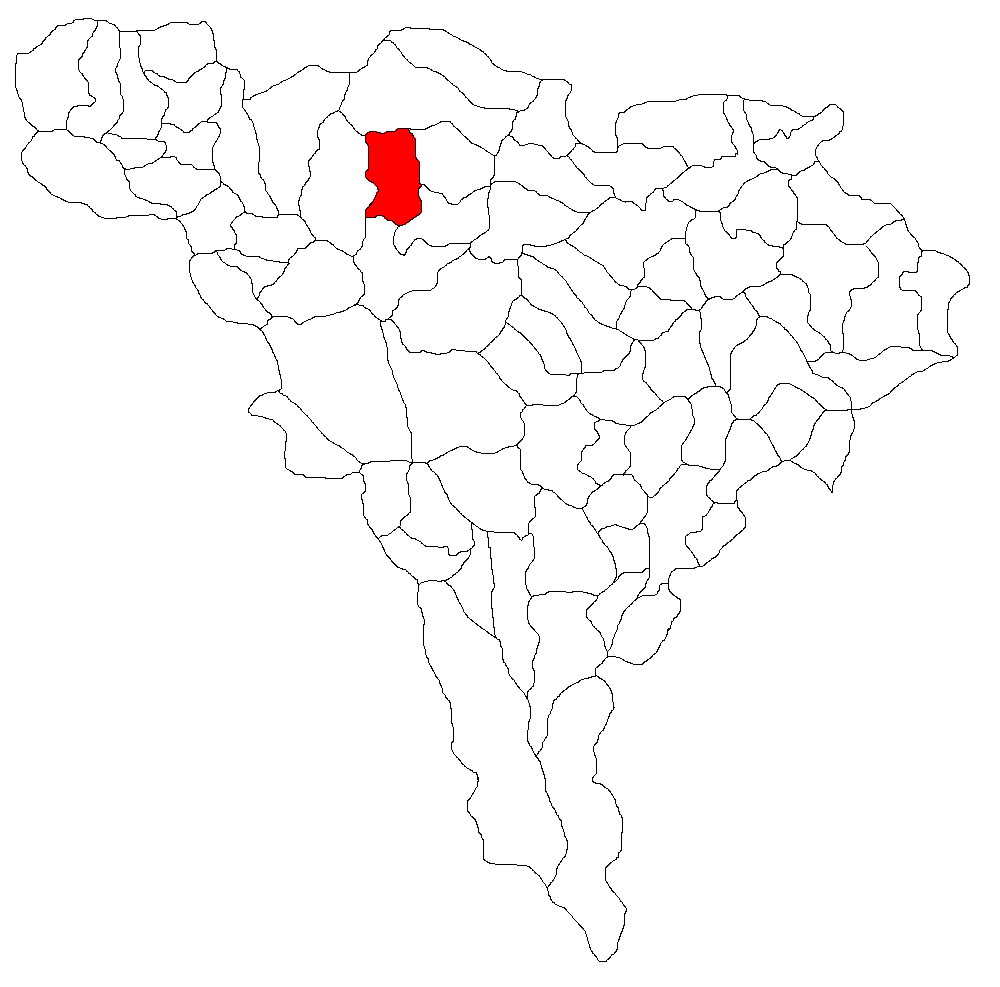
- Location in Alba County

- Location in Romania
- Coordinates: 46°22′46″N 23°16′47″E
- Country: Romania
- County: Alba

Government
  - Mayor (2024–2028): Marius Daniel Dup (AUR)
- Area: 79.67 km^{2} (30.76 sq mi)
- Elevation: 485 m (1,591 ft)
- Population (2021-12-01): 3,035
  - Density: 38.09/km^{2} (98.66/sq mi)
- Time zone: UTC+02:00 (EET)
  - Summer (DST): UTC+03:00 (EEST)
- Postal code: 515300
- Area code: (+40) 02 58
- Vehicle reg.: AB
- Website: primariabaiadearies.ro

Baia de Arieș (Hungarian: Aranyosbánya or Offenbánya; German: Offenburg) is a town in Alba County, Romania. It administers five villages: Brăzești (Berzesd), Cioara de Sus (Felsőcsóra), Muncelu (Muncsal), Sartăș (Szártos), and Simulești. With a population of 3,035 in 2021, it was until 2004 a mining centre extracting, mainly for base metals but also arsenopyrite and pyrite-rich concentrate containing gold.

The first writing about it is in a document of Charles I of Hungary since 1325. In the beginning of the 15th century it was declared free town. It lost town status later, but regained it in 1998.

Baia de Arieș's tourist objectives are the monument of nature tree known as the "Emperor's beech" and the Muncel Monastery.

== Demographics ==
Historical population
Year	Pop.	±%
2002	4,877	—
2011	3,433	−29.6%
2021	3,035	−11.6%
Source: Census data

According to the census from 2011, the town had a total population of 3433; of those, 99.3% were ethnic Romanians, 0.55% ethnic Hungarians, and 0.19% ethnic Romani. At the 2021 census, Baia de Arieș had a population of 3,035, of which 91.37% were Romanians.

== Climate ==
Baia de Arieș has a warm-summer humid continental climate (Dfb in the Köppen climate classification).

Climate data for Baia de Arieș
Month	Jan	Feb	Mar	Apr	May	Jun	Jul	Aug	Sep	Oct	Nov	Dec	Year
Mean daily maximum °C (°F)	−0.1 (31.8)	1.7 (35.1)	6 (43)	12.2 (54.0)	16.7 (62.1)	19.9 (67.8)	21.6 (70.9)	21.9 (71.4)	17.1 (62.8)	12.1 (53.8)	6.9 (44.4)	1.2 (34.2)	11.4 (52.6)
Daily mean °C (°F)	−3.7 (25.3)	−2.1 (28.2)	1.7 (35.1)	7.6 (45.7)	12.4 (54.3)	15.8 (60.4)	17.5 (63.5)	17.7 (63.9)	13 (55)	8 (46)	3.3 (37.9)	−2 (28)	7.4 (45.3)
Mean daily minimum °C (°F)	−7.1 (19.2)	−5.8 (21.6)	−2.7 (27.1)	2.5 (36.5)	7.4 (45.3)	10.9 (51.6)	12.7 (54.9)	13.2 (55.8)	8.9 (48.0)	4.2 (39.6)	0.2 (32.4)	−5 (23)	3.3 (37.9)
Average precipitation mm (inches)	49 (1.9)	50 (2.0)	73 (2.9)	116 (4.6)	154 (6.1)	177 (7.0)	184 (7.2)	150 (5.9)	103 (4.1)	73 (2.9)	57 (2.2)	59 (2.3)	1,245 (49.1)
Source: https://en.climate-data.org/europe/romania/alba/baia-de-aries-15624/
