= Câmpeni =

- Town
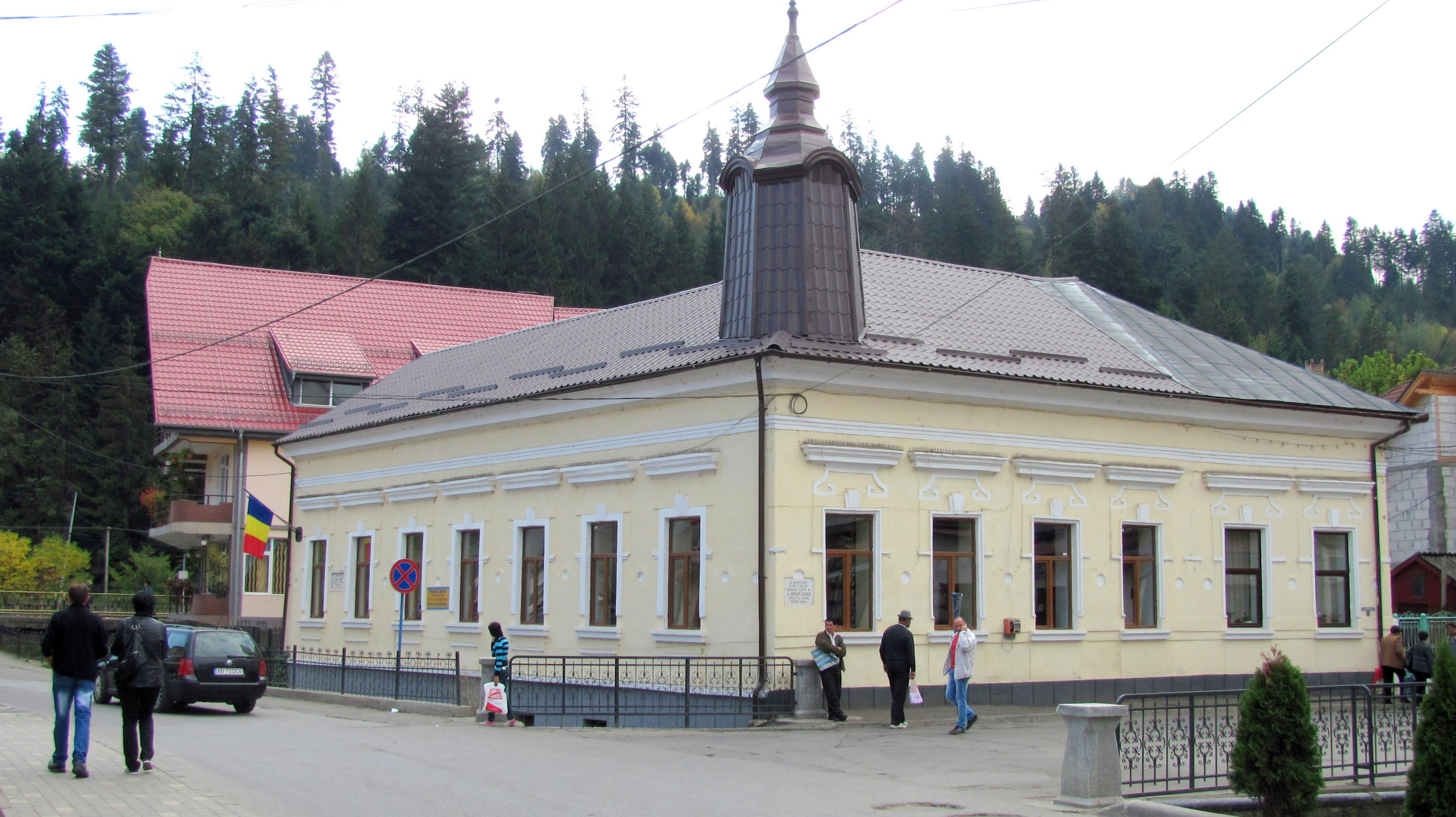
- Avram Iancu Museum in Câmpeni

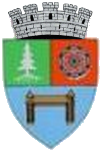
- Coat of arms

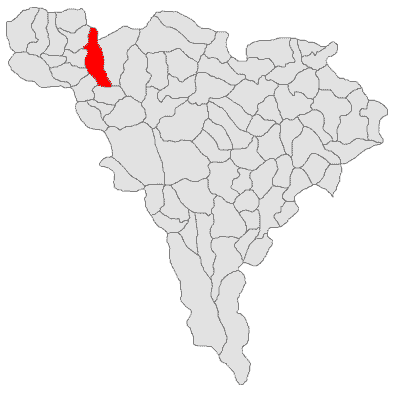
- Location in Alba County

- Location in Romania
- Coordinates: 46°21′45″N 23°2′44″E
- Country: Romania
- County: Alba

Government
  - Mayor (2024–2028): Cristian-Dan Pașca (PNL)
- Area: 86.77 km^{2} (33.50 sq mi)
- Elevation: 553 m (1,814 ft)
- Population (2021-12-01): 6,569
  - Density: 75.71/km^{2} (196.1/sq mi)
- Time zone: UTC+02:00 (EET)
  - Summer (DST): UTC+03:00 (EEST)
- Postal code: 515500
- Area code: +(40) 0258
- Vehicle reg.: AB
- Website: www.primariacimpeni.ro

Câmpeni (German: Topesdorf; Hungarian: Topánfalva) is a town in Alba County, Transylvania, Romania. The town administers 21 villages: Boncești, Borlești, Botești (Botesbánya), Certege (Csertés), Coasta Vâscului, Dănduț, Dealu Bistrii, Dealu Capsei, Dric, Fața Abrudului, Florești, Furduiești, Mihoești, Motorăști, Peste Valea Bistrii, Poduri, Sorlița, Tomușești, Valea Bistrii, Valea Caselor, and Vârși (Virs).

== History ==
The town has historical significance as the capital of the "Țara Moților" region. It is believed to be the site where the Revolt of Horea, Cloșca and Crișan (1784–1785) started. Horea was born near Câmpeni in the village that used to be called Arada (since renamed to Horea). His cellar is a tourist attraction in the town.

During the Transylvanian revolution of 1848, Câmpeni was the political and military stronghold of Avram Iancu, a revolutionary leader of the Transylvanian Romanians' national movement. The Avram Iancu Museum is located in the town.

== Economy ==
The town is a regional center for lumber exploitation and the furniture industry. Even though the town is located in a mining region the mining industry is not part of its industrial heritage. Câmpeni is growing in popularity as a tourist center.

== Demographics ==
Historical population
Year	Pop.	±%
1966	7,170	—
1977	7,682	+7.1%
1992	8,878	+15.6%
2002	8,587	−3.3%
2011	6,942	−19.2%
2021	6,569	−5.4%
Source: Census data

At the 2021 census, Câmpeni had a population of 6,569. According to the census from 2011, the town had a total population of 6,942; of those, 96.52% were ethnic Romanians, 3.35% ethnic Romani, and 0.08% ethnic Hungarians.

== Natives ==
- Valeriu Moldovan (1875–1954), lawyer and politician
- Rubin Patiția (1841–1918), lawyer and political activist
- Iosif Trifa (1888–1938), Romanian Orthodox priest and evangelist
- Valerian Trifa (1914–1987), archbishop of the Romanian Orthodox Church in America and Canada, member of the Iron Guard

== Climate ==
Câmpeni has a warm-summer humid continental climate (Dfb in the Köppen climate classification).

Climate data for Câmpeni
Month	Jan	Feb	Mar	Apr	May	Jun	Jul	Aug	Sep	Oct	Nov	Dec	Year
Mean daily maximum °C (°F)	0.3 (32.5)	2.1 (35.8)	6.5 (43.7)	12.9 (55.2)	17.3 (63.1)	20.5 (68.9)	22.2 (72.0)	22.5 (72.5)	17.7 (63.9)	12.6 (54.7)	7.5 (45.5)	1.6 (34.9)	12.0 (53.6)
Daily mean °C (°F)	−3 (27)	−1.5 (29.3)	2.5 (36.5)	8.6 (47.5)	13.3 (55.9)	16.6 (61.9)	18.3 (64.9)	18.6 (65.5)	13.8 (56.8)	8.8 (47.8)	4.1 (39.4)	−1.4 (29.5)	8.2 (46.8)
Mean daily minimum °C (°F)	−6 (21)	−4.9 (23.2)	−1.3 (29.7)	4.2 (39.6)	8.9 (48.0)	12.3 (54.1)	14.1 (57.4)	14.7 (58.5)	10.2 (50.4)	5.5 (41.9)	1.4 (34.5)	−4 (25)	4.6 (40.3)
Average precipitation mm (inches)	56 (2.2)	53 (2.1)	71 (2.8)	97 (3.8)	131 (5.2)	149 (5.9)	149 (5.9)	108 (4.3)	84 (3.3)	62 (2.4)	60 (2.4)	66 (2.6)	1,086 (42.9)
Source: https://en.climate-data.org/europe/romania/alba/campeni-44397/
