= Alba County =

County of Romania

Coordinates: 46.1333°N 23.5333°E

Alba County Județul Alba
- County
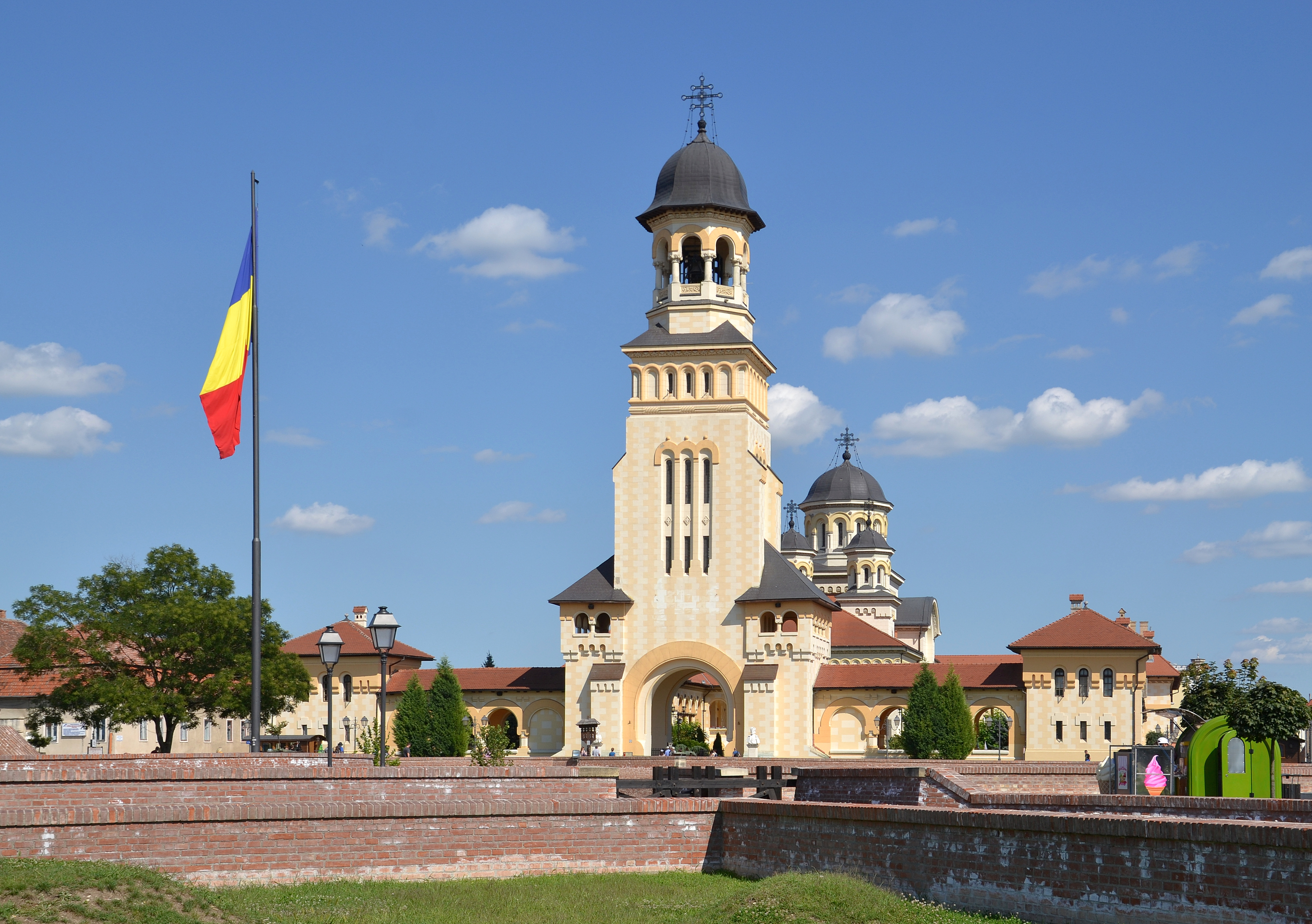
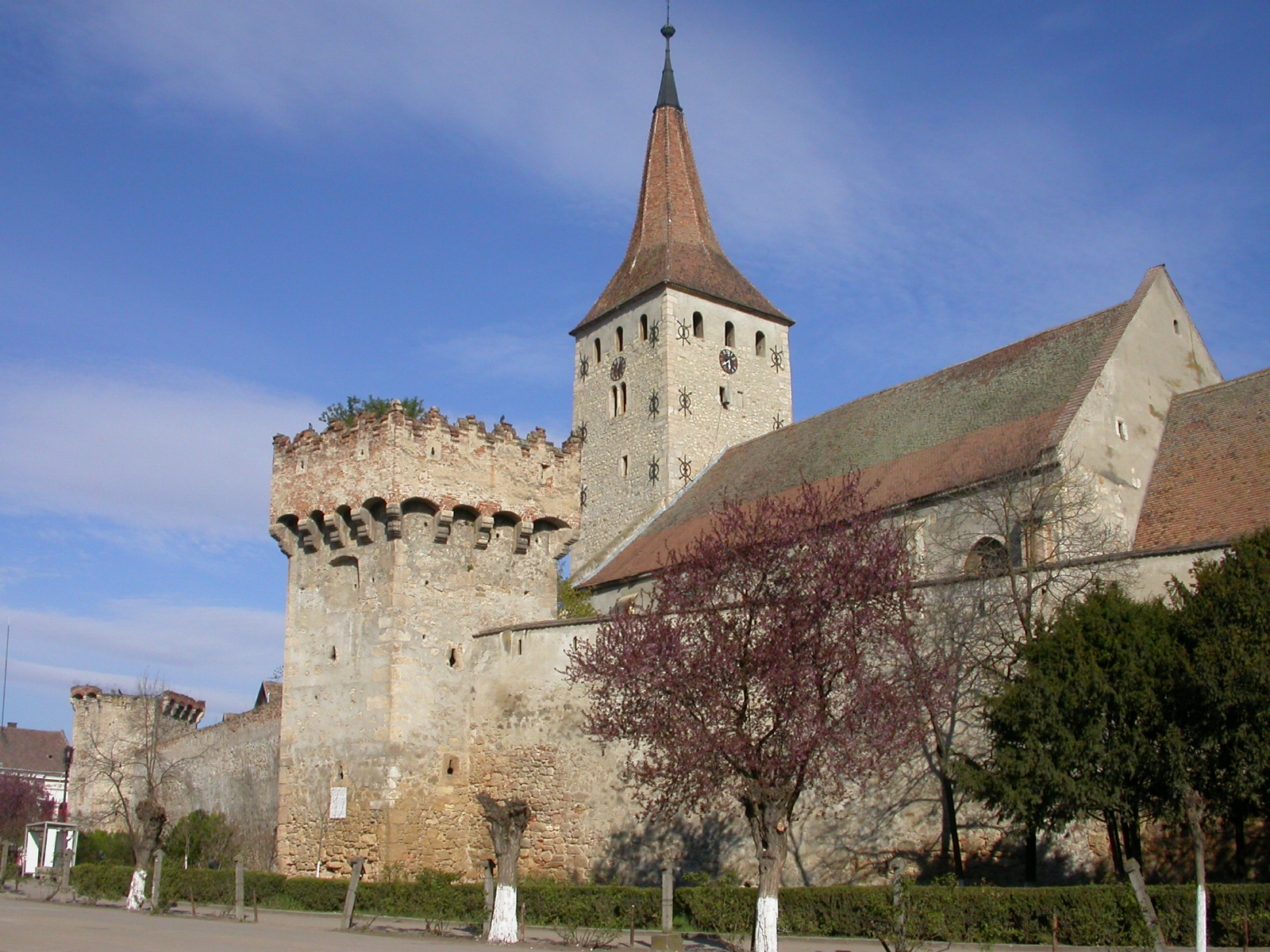
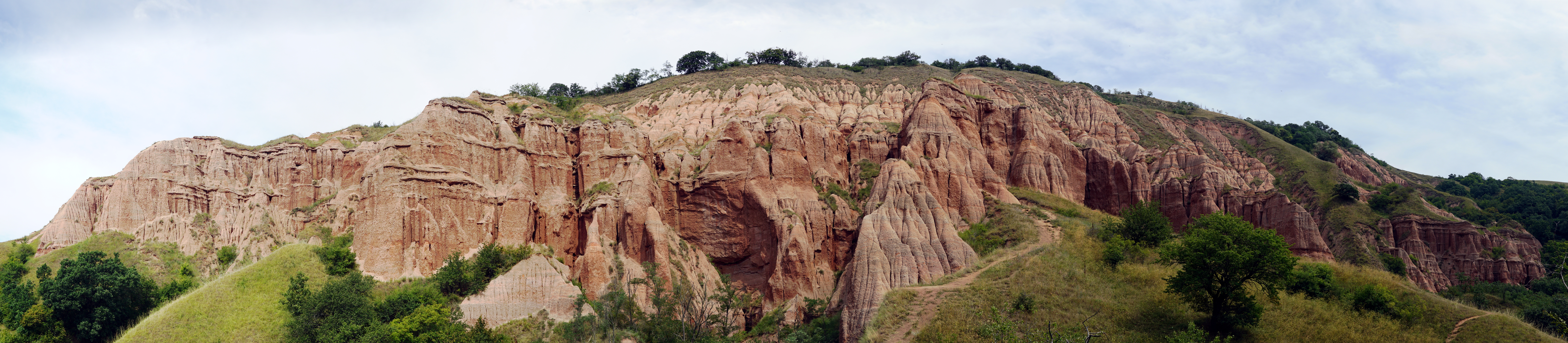
- Oașa Lake and Șureanu Mountains Coronation Cathedral Aiud Citadel Râpa Roșie

- Flag Coat of arms

- Location of Alba County in Romania
- Country: Romania
- Development region^{1}: Centru
- Historic region: Transylvania
- County seat: Alba Iulia

Government
  - Type: County Council
  - President of the County Council: Ion Dumitrel (PNL)
  - Prefect^{2}: Nicolae Albu

Area
  - Total: 6,242 km^{2} (2,410 sq mi)
  - Rank: 16th in Romania

Population (2021-12-01)
  - Total: 325,941
  - Rank: 29th in Romania
  - Density: 52.22/km^{2} (135.2/sq mi)
- Time zone: UTC+2 (EET)
  - Summer (DST): UTC+3 (EEST)
- Postal Code: 51wxyz^{3}
- Area code: +40 x58^{4}
- Car Plates: AB^{5}
- GDP: US$ 6.760 billion (2025)
- GDP per capita: US$ 20,739 (2025)
- Website: County Council; County Prefecture

Alba County (Romanian pronunciation: [ˈalba]) is a county (județ) of Romania located in the historic region of Transylvania. Its capital is Alba Iulia, a city with a population of 63,536.

== Name ==
"Alba", meaning "white" in Latin and Romanian, is derived from the name of the city of Alba Iulia. In Hungarian, the county is known as Fehér megye (fehér also meaning white), and in German as Kreis Karlsburg.

== Geography ==

This county has a total area of 6,242 km^{2} (2,410 sq mi), with mountains occupying about 59% of its surface.

The Apuseni Mountains are in the northwest; the northeastern side of the Parâng Mountains group – the Șureanu and Cindrel mountains – are in the south. In the east there is the Transylvanian Plateau with deep but wide valleys. The three main elements are separated by the Mureș River valley.

The main rivers are the Mureș River and its tributaries, the Târnava, the Sebeș, and the Arieș.

=== Neighbors ===
- Sibiu County and Mureș County to the east.
- Bihor County and Arad County to the west.
- Cluj County to the north.
- Hunedoara County to the southwest.
- Vâlcea County to the south.

== Economy ==
The predominant industries in the county are:

- Food industry
- Textile industry
- Wood industry
- Mechanical components
- Paper and packaging materials industry
- Chemical industry

The mineral resources exploited in Alba county are metals (gold, silver, copper), salt, and construction materials, including marble and granite.

== Tourist attractions ==
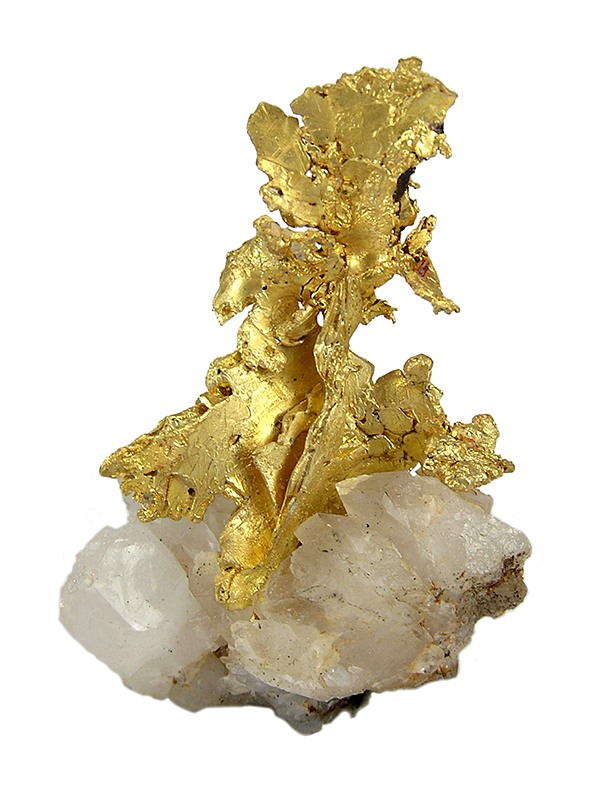
Gold in quartz, Roșia Montană. Size 4.3 × 2.7 × 1.3 cm.

The main tourist attractions in the county are:

- The city of Alba Iulia
- The Apuseni Mountains
  - Scărișoara karst complex
  - Maidens' Fair on the Găina Mountain
  - The Dealul cu melci ("Snail Hill") west of Vidra
  - Barren Detunata and Shaggy Detunata (Detunatele)
- The Câlnic Citadel and the castle of Gârbova
- The towns and churches of Sebeș and Aiud
- The Ocna Mureș resort
- The Țara Moților ethnographical area. Situated in the Apuseni Mountains, Țara Moților is a region with strong and distinct Romanian traditions.
- Roșia Montană Mining Cultural Landscape - Mining began 2000 years ago on Mt. Kirnik (Cârnic), with well-preserved Roman galleries. A Canadian company attempted an open-pit mine, but abandoned the project around 2007. Roșia Montană is a famous locality among mineral collectors for fine native gold specimens.
- The Via Transilvanica hiking and biking trail

== Demographics ==
According to the 2021 census, the county had a population of 325,941 and the population density was 52.2/km^{2} (135.2/sq mi).

Ethnic composition of Alba County (2021)
1. Romanians (91.4%)
2. Romani (4.43%)
3. Hungarians (3.91%)
4. Germans (Transylvanian Saxons) (0.18%)
5. Others (0.11%)

Year	County population
1948	361,062
1956	370,800 ▲
1966	382,786 ▲
1977	409,634 ▲
1992	414,227 ▲
2002	382,747 ▼
2011	327,224 ▼
2021	325,941 ▼

== Politics ==
The Alba County Council, renewed at the 2024 local elections, consists of 32 county councillors, with the following party composition:

Party	Seats	Current County Council
National Liberal Party (PNL)	17	
Social Democratic Party (PSD)	10	
Alliance for the Union of Romanians (AUR)	5	

== Administrative divisions ==
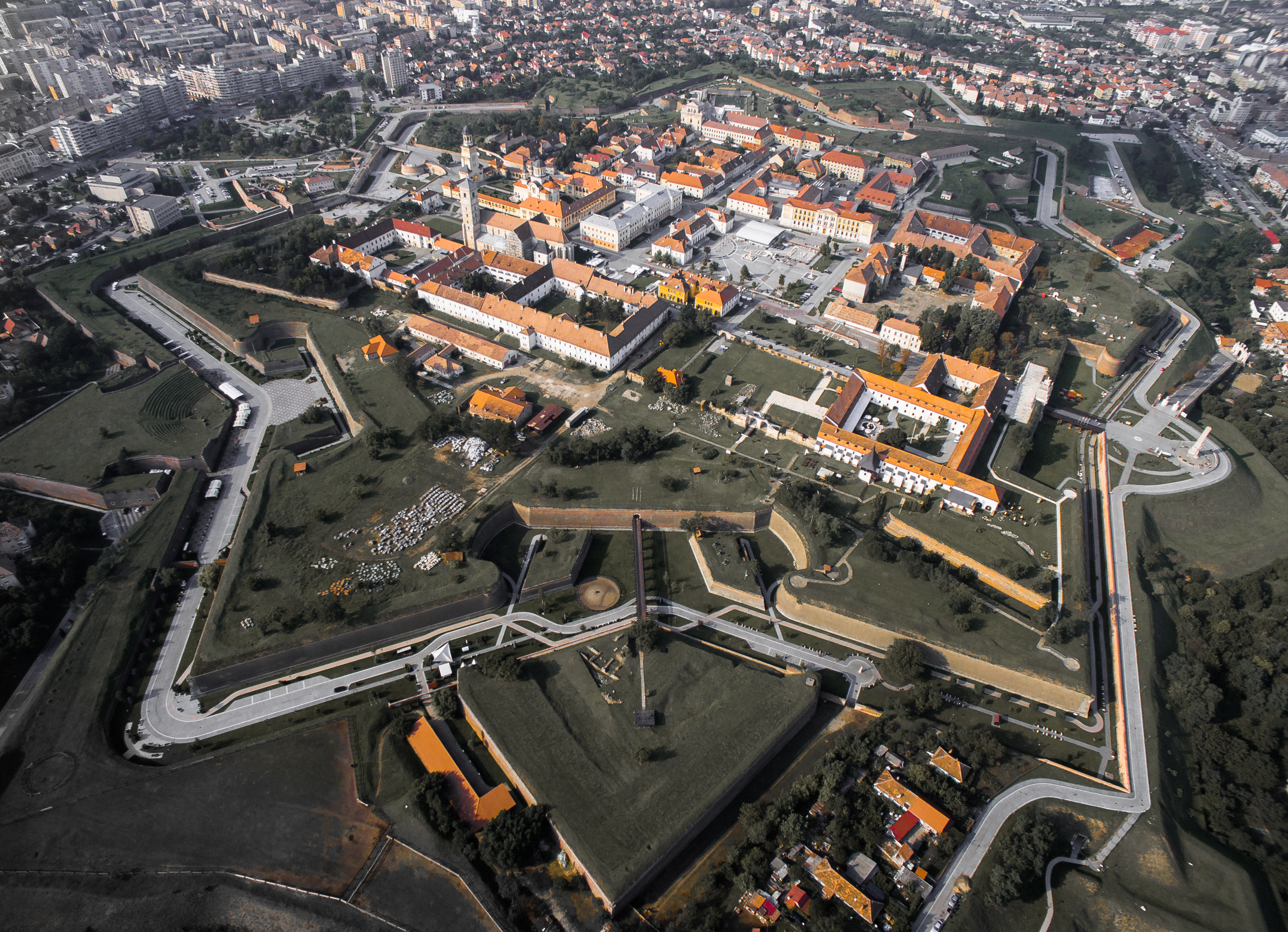
Alba Iulia (German: Karlsburg/Weißenburg)

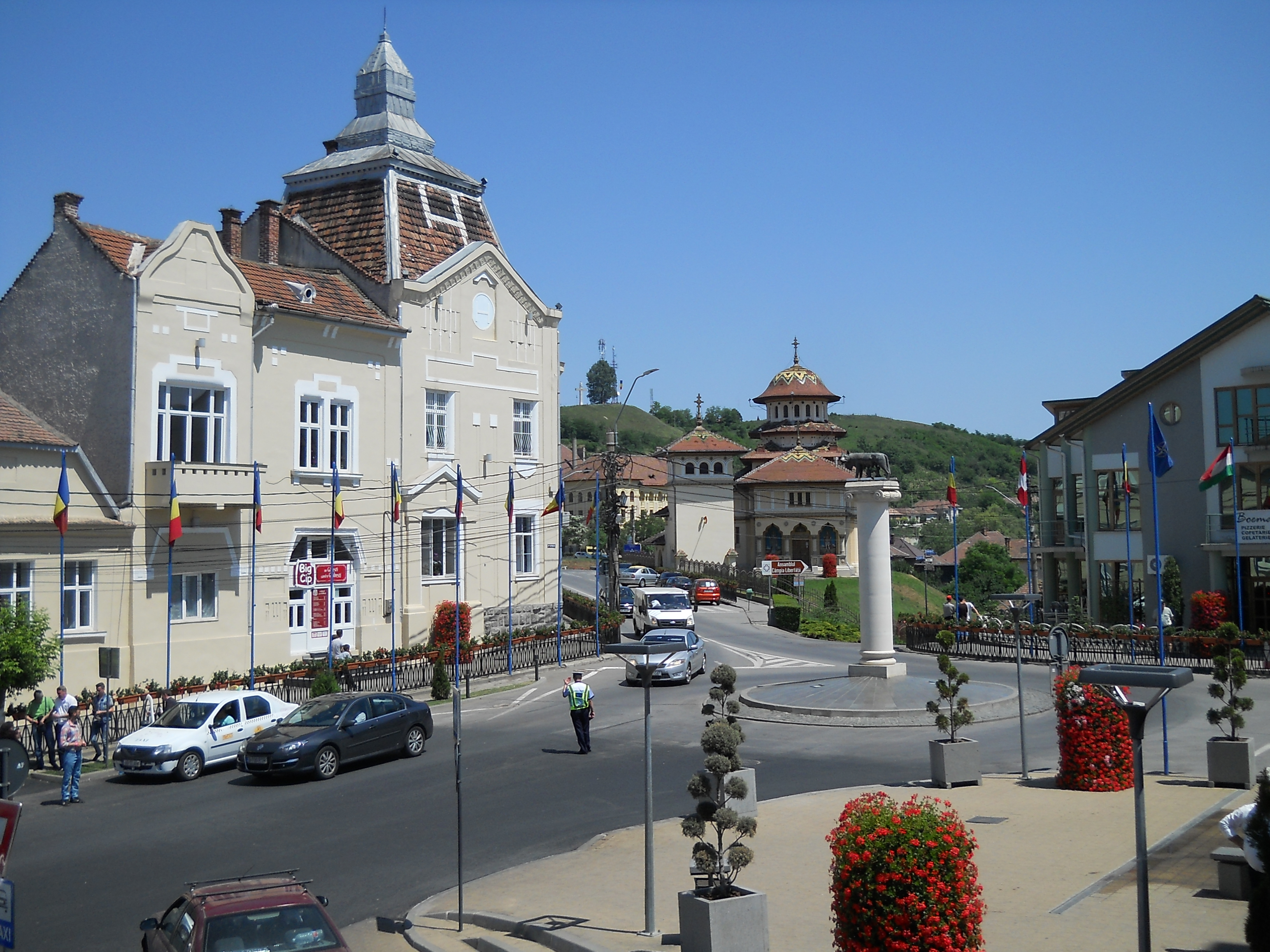
Blaj

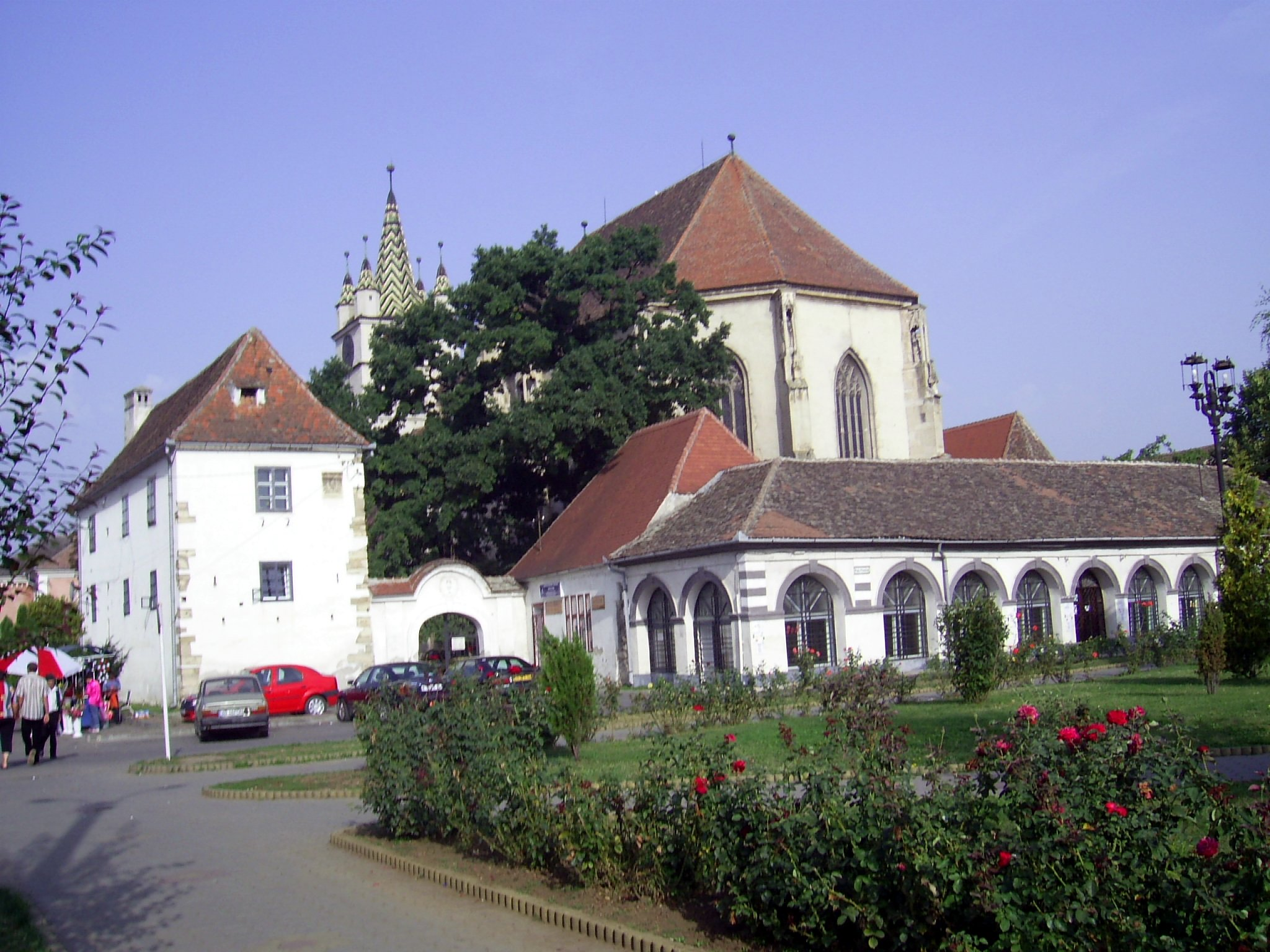
Sebeș (German: Mühlbach)

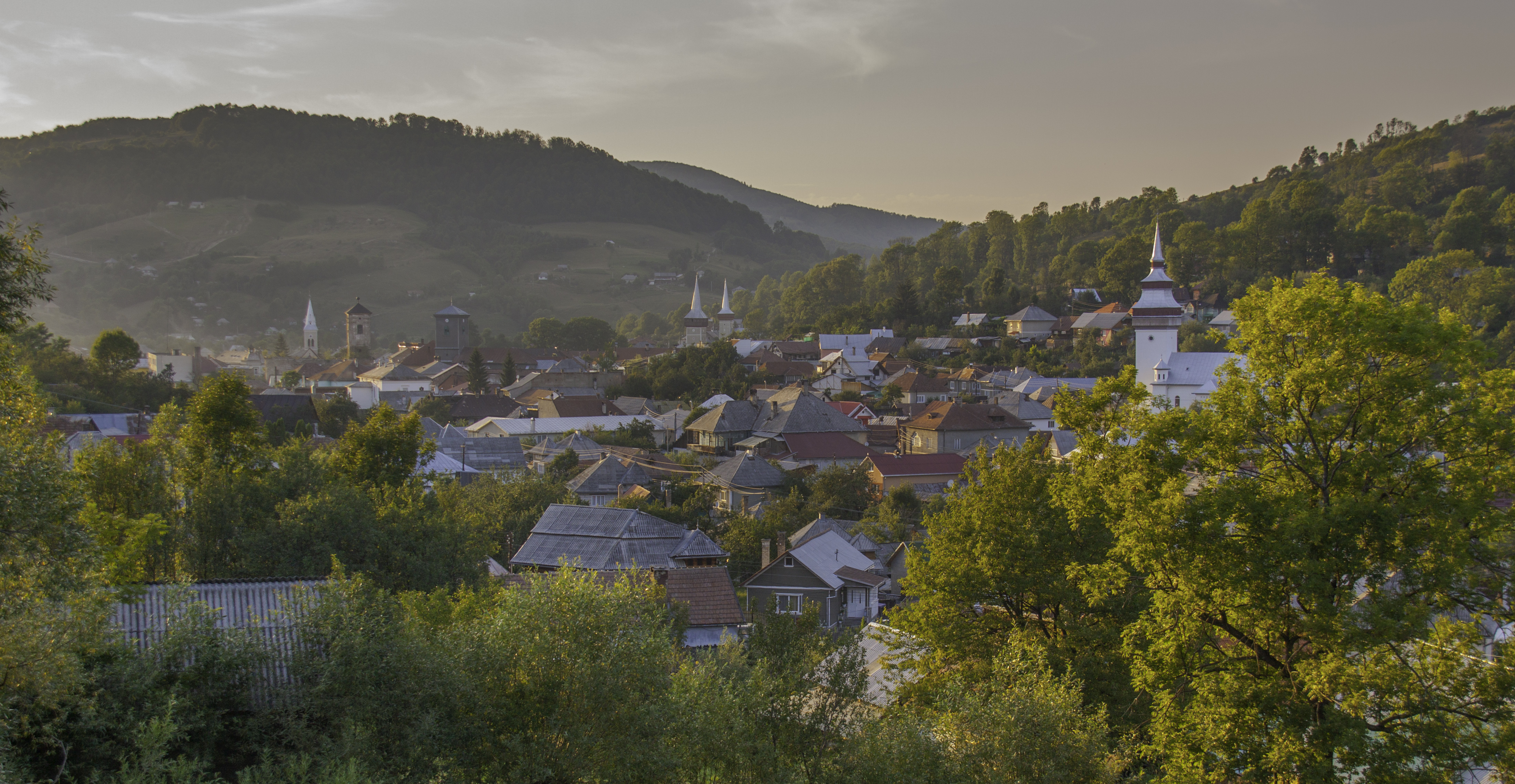
Abrud

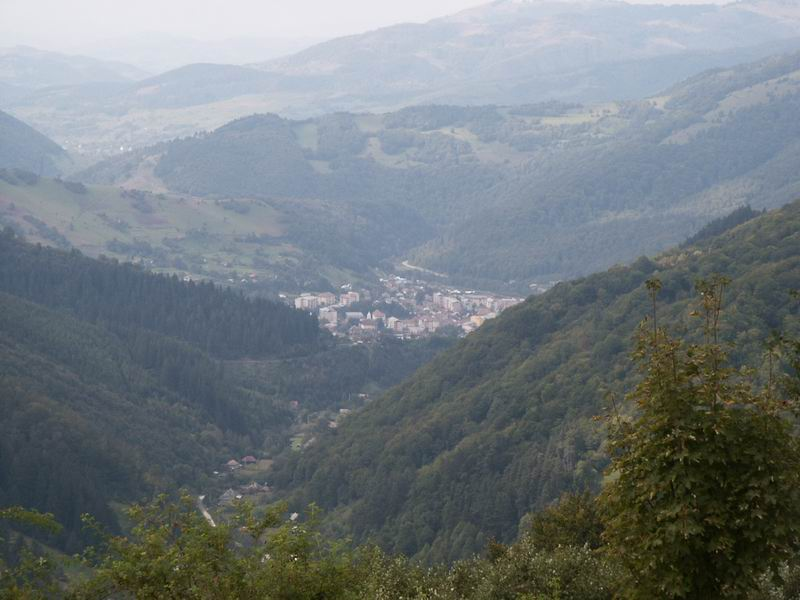
Baia de Arieș

Alba County has 4 municipalities, 7 towns, and 67 communes.

- Municipalities:
  - Aiud
  - Alba Iulia – county seat; pop. 58,761 (as of 2011)
  - Blaj
  - Sebeș
- Towns:
  - Abrud
  - Baia de Arieș
  - Câmpeni
  - Cugir
  - Ocna Mureș
  - Teiuș
  - Zlatna
- Communes:
  - Albac
  - Almașu Mare
  - Arieșeni
  - Avram Iancu
  - Berghin
  - Bistra
  - Blandiana
  - Bucerdea Grânoasă
  - Bucium
  - Câlnic
  - Cenade
  - Cergău
  - Ceru-Băcăinți
  - Cetatea de Baltă
  - Ciugud
  - Ciuruleasa
  - Crăciunelu de Jos
  - Cricău
  - Cut
  - Daia Româna
  - Doștat
  - Fărău
  - Galda de Jos
  - Gârbova
  - Gârda de Sus
  - Hopârta
  - Horea
  - Ighiu
  - Întregalde
  - Jidvei
  - Livezile
  - Lopadea Nouă
  - Lunca Mureşului
  - Lupșa
  - Meteș
  - Mihalț
  - Mirăslău
  - Mogoș
  - Noșlac
  - Ocoliș
  - Ohaba
  - Pianu
  - Poiana Vadului
  - Ponor
  - Poșaga
  - Rădești
  - Râmeț
  - Rimetea
  - Roșia de Secaș
  - Roșia Montană
  - Sălciua
  - Săliștea
  - Sâncel
  - Sântimbru
  - Săsciori
  - Scărișoara
  - Șibot
  - Sohodol
  - Șona
  - Șpring
  - Stremț
  - Șugag
  - Unirea
  - Vadu Moților
  - Valea Lungă
  - Vidra
  - Vințu de Jos

== Historical county ==
Județul Alba
- County (Județ)
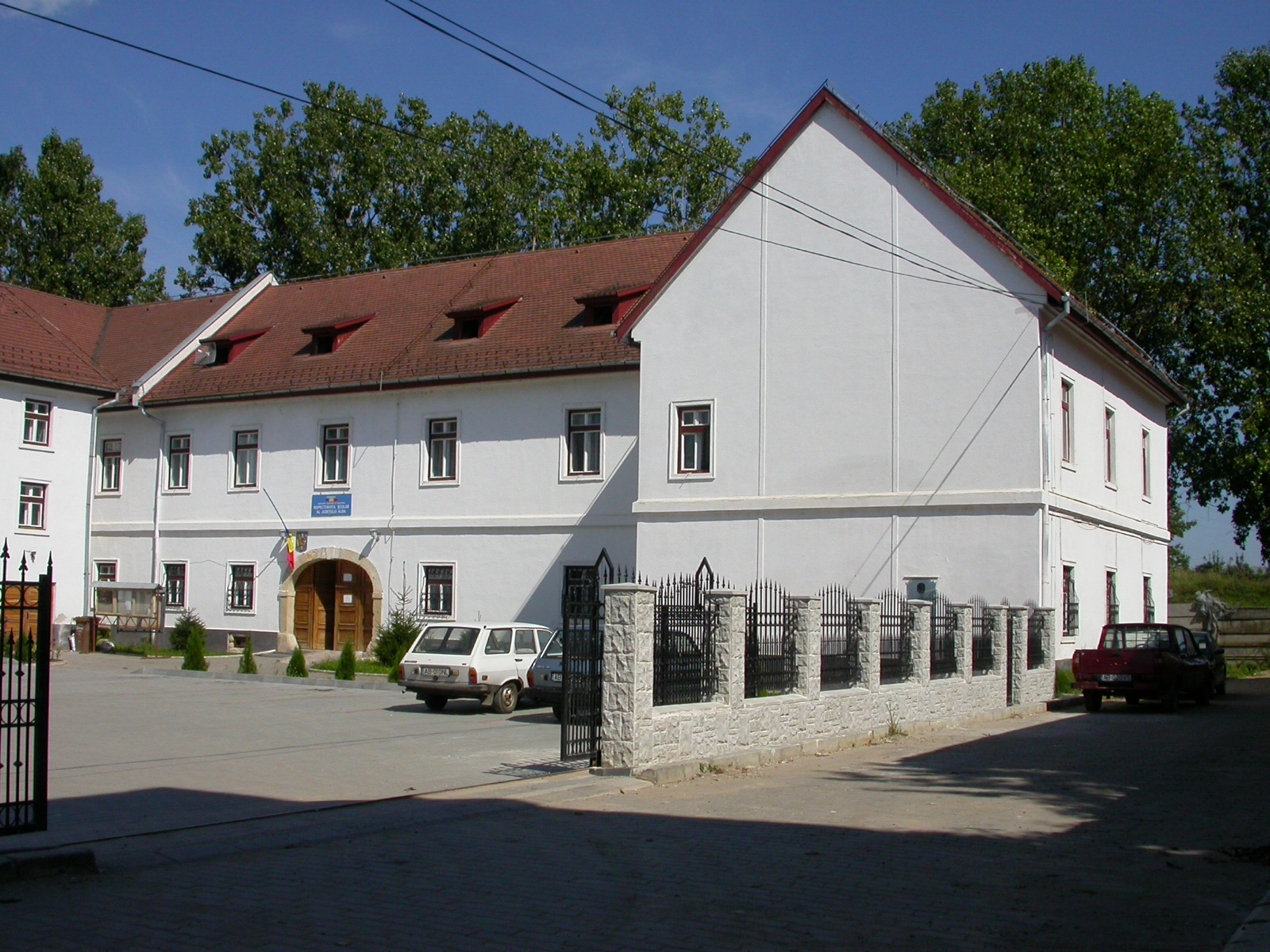
- The Alba County Prefecture building of the interwar period, currently the headquarters of the Alba County Schools Inspectorate.

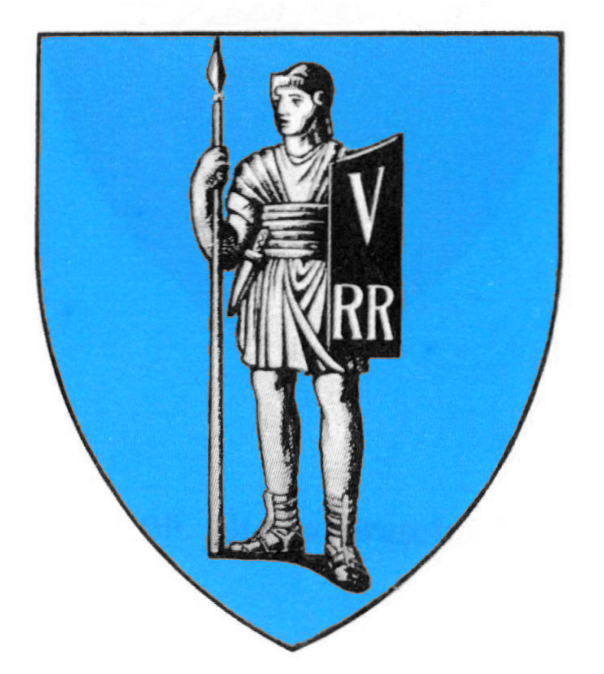
- Coat of arms

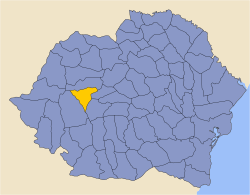
- Country: Romania
- Historic region: Transylvania
- Capital city (Reședință de județ): Alba-Iulia
- Established: 1925

Area
  - Total: 2,433 km^{2} (939 sq mi)

Population (1930)
  - Total: 213,795
  - Density: 87.87/km^{2} (227.6/sq mi)
- Time zone: UTC+2 (EET)
  - Summer (DST): UTC+3 (EEST)

Historically, Alba de Jos County was located in the central-western part of Greater Romania, in the southwestern part of Transylvania, with a territory identical with the old Alsó-Fehér County of Hungary. After the administrative unification law in 1925, the name of the county changed to Alba County and the territory was reorganized. It was bordered on the west by Hunedoara County, to the north by Turda County, and to the east by the counties of Sibiu and Târnava-Mică. Its territory included the central part of the current Alba County.

=== Administration ===
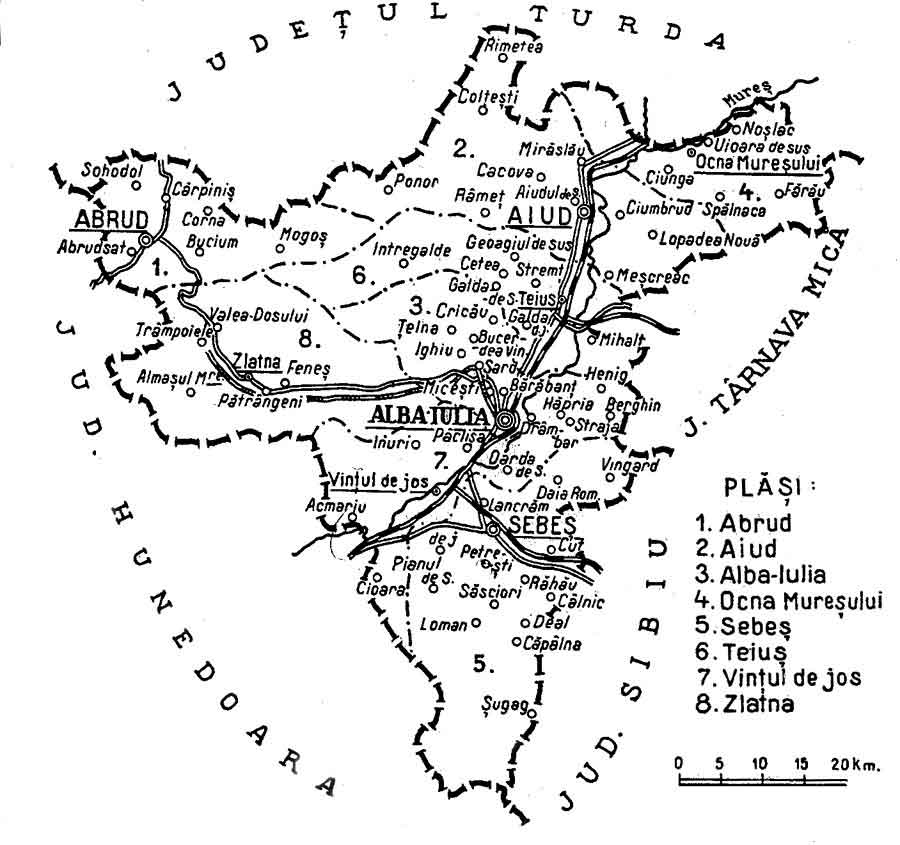
Map of Alba County as constituted in 1938.

The county originally consisted of seven districts (plăși):

1. Plasa Abrud (headquarters at Abrud)
2. Plasa Aiud (headquarters at Aiud)
3. Plasa Ighiu (headquarters at Ighiu)
4. Plasa Ocna Mureș (headquarters at Ocna Mureș)
5. Plasa Sebeș (headquarters at Sebeș)
6. Plasa Teiuș (headquarters at Teiuș)
7. Plasa Vințu de Jos (headquarters at Vințu de Jos)

Subsequently, Plasa Ighiu was abolished and two other districts were established, leaving these:

1. Plasa Abrud (seven villages, headquarters at Abrud)
2. Plasa Aiud (thirty-three villages, headquarters at Aiud)
3. Plasa Alba Iulia (eighteen villages, headquarters at Alba Iulia)
4. Plasa Ocna Mureș (twenty-one villages, headquarters at Ocna Mureș)
5. Plasa Sebeș (twenty-one villages, headquarters at Sebeș)
6. Plasa Teiuș (twenty villages, headquarters at Teiuș)
7. Plasa Vințu de Jos (thirteen villages, headquarters at Vințu de Jos)
8. Plasa Zlatna (eighteen villages, headquarters at Zlatna)

There were four towns: Alba Iulia, Abrud, Aiud, and Sebeș.

=== Population ===
According to the census data of 1930, the county's population was 212,749, of which 81.5% were Romanians, 11.3% Hungarians, 3.6% Germans, 1.8% Romanies, 1.4% Jews, as well as other minorities. In the religious aspect, the population consisted of 50.1% Eastern Orthodox, 31.6% Greek Catholics, 7.5% Reformed (Calvinists), 3.4% Roman Catholics, 3.3% Evangelical (Lutherans), 1.2% Unitarians, and other minorities.

==== Urban population ====
In 1930, the urban population of the county was 33,365, of which 58.8% were Romanians, 23.0% Hungarians, 8.2% Germans, 6.2% Jews, 1.6% Romanies, as well as other minorities. From the religious point of view, the urban population was made up of 38.3% Eastern Orthodox, 21.4% Greek Catholic, 14.7% Reformed (Calvinist), 7.2% Evangelical (Lutheran), 6.5% Jewish, as well as other minorities.

=== After 1938 ===
After the 1938 Administrative and Constitutional Reform, this county merged with the counties of Ciuc, Odorhei, Sibiu, Târnava Mare, and Târnava Mică to form Ținutul Mureș. The county was re-established in 1940, but dissolved again in 1950. It was re-established in 1968 in its current borders.

== People ==
Notable natives include:

- Ion Agârbiceanu
- Lucian Blaga
- Avram Iancu
- Sofronie of Cioara
- Ioan Suciu
