= Apuseni Natural Park =

Romanian protected area

- Parcul Natural Apuseni
- IUCN category V (protected landscape/seascape)
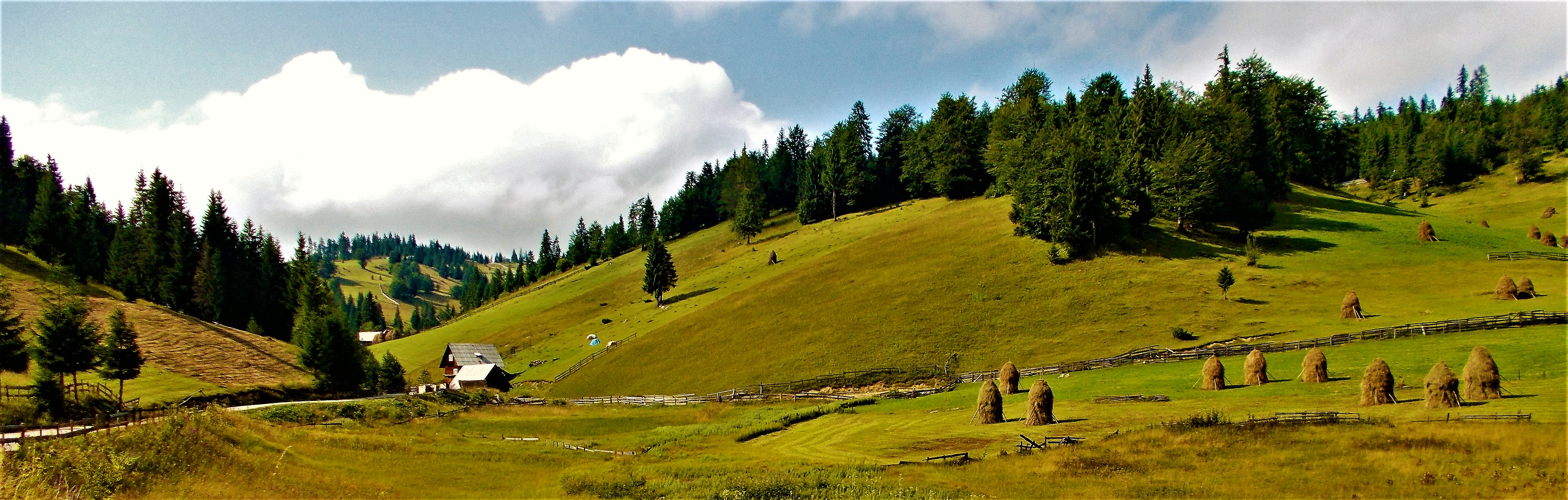
- Gârda de Sus, in the Apuseni Mountains

- Location within Romania
- Location: Romania; Alba County; Bihor County; Cluj County
- Nearest city: Huedin
- Coordinates: 46.604°N 22.810°E
- Area: 75784 hectares (187270 acres)
- Established: 2000, designation 1990
- Website: parcapuseni.ro

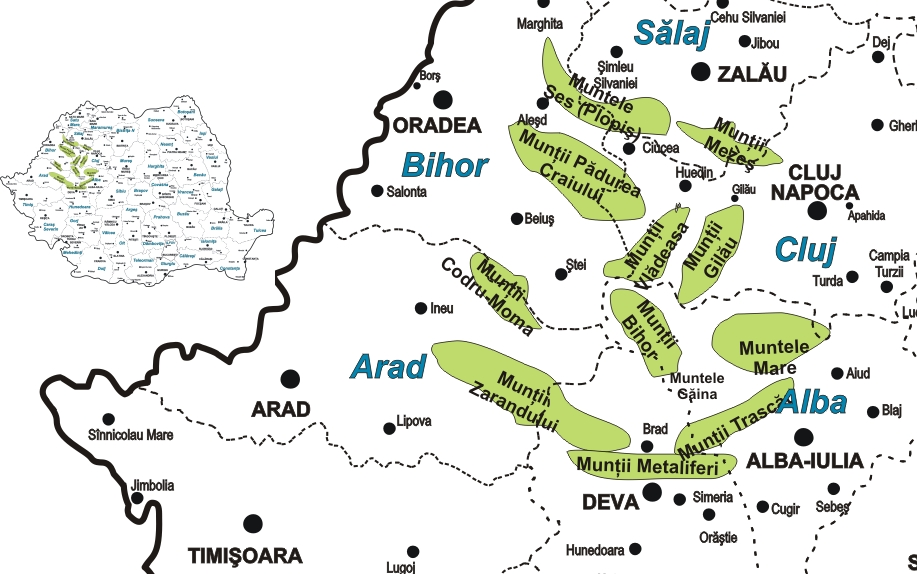
Map of the Apuseni Mountains

The Apuseni Natural Park (Romanian: Parcul Natural Apuseni) is a protected area (natural park category V IUCN) situated in Romania, in the administrative territory of counties Alba (28%), Bihor (32 %), and Cluj (40%).

== Location ==
The Natural Park is located in western Romania in the central-northern side of the Apuseni Mountains, comprising part of the Bihor Mountains to the south and Vlădeasa Mountains to the north. It is situated on the administrative territory of 16 communes, which include 53 localities fully and 8 others partially. The Park features 3 resorts: Boga, Fântânele, and Vârtop.

== Natural reserves ==
The Apuseni Natural Park with an area of 75,784 ha (187,270 acres) was declared natural protected area by the Law Number 5 of March 6, 2000 (published in the Monitorul Oficial of Romania, Number 152 of April 12, 2000) and represents a mountainous area (mountain peaks, cirques, caves, valleys, karst areas, forests, and pastures), with flora and fauna specific to the Western Carpathians.

Natural reserves included in the park:

- Alba County

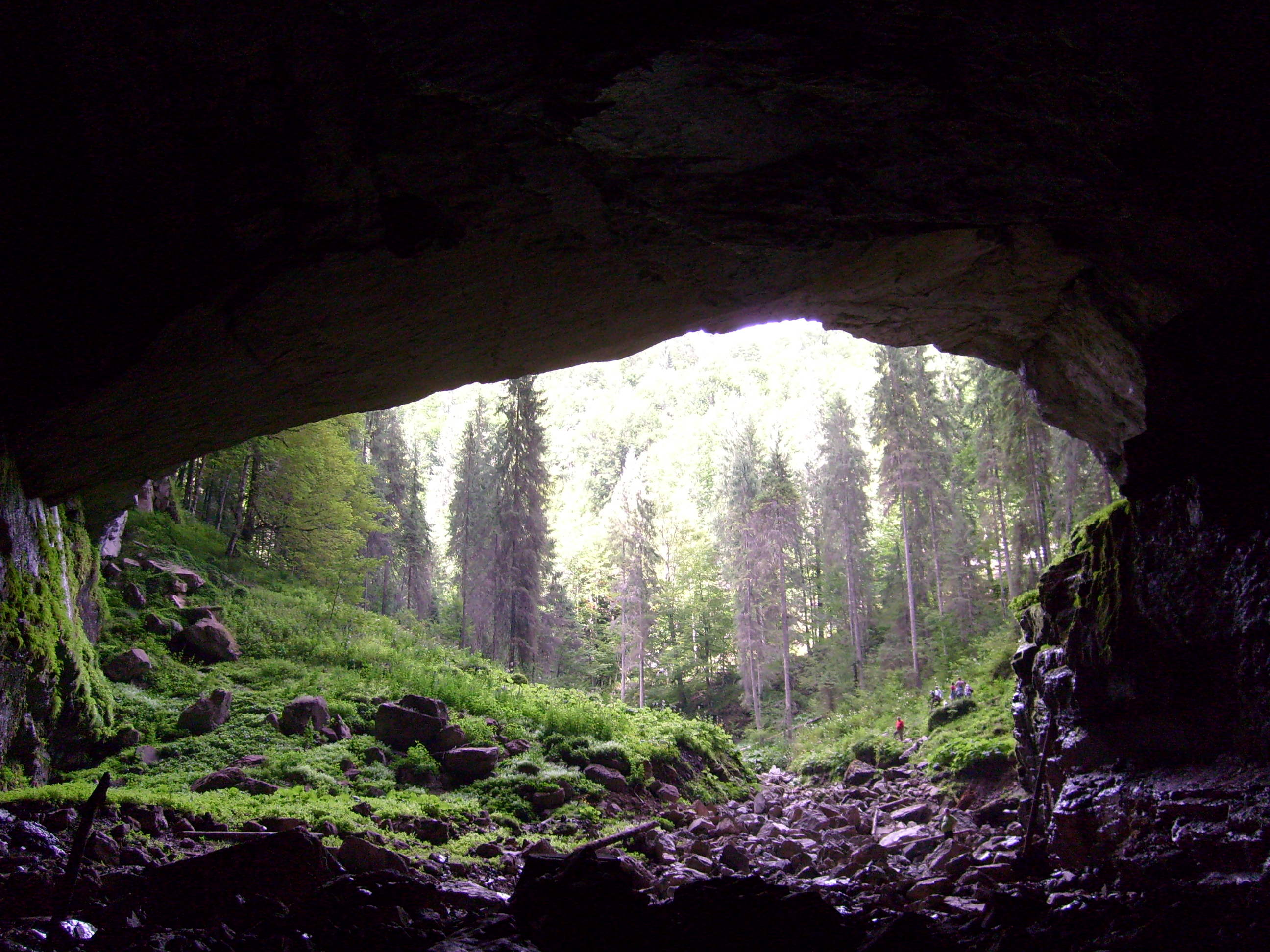
Portal of the Coiba Mare Cave

  - Avenul din Hoanca Urzicarului, 1 ha (2.5 acres)
  - Coiba Mare Cave, 0.5 ha (1.2 acres)
  - Ghețarul de la Vârtop Cave, 1 ha (2.5 acres)
  - Izbucul de la Cotețul Dobreștilor, 0.2 ha (0.49 acres)
  - Izbucul Mătișești, 2 ha (4.9 acres)
  - Izbucul Tăuzului, 1 ha (2.5 acres)
  - Scărișoara Cave, 1 ha (2.5 acres)

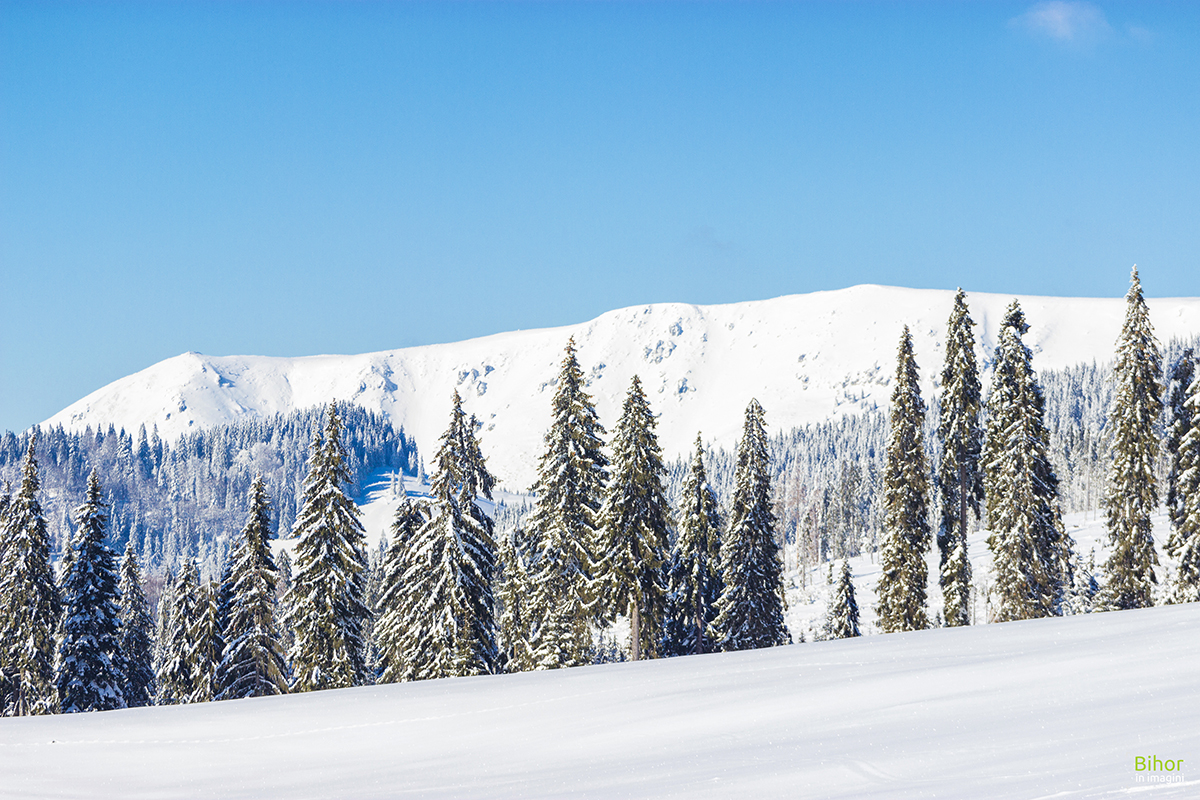
Cârligați Peak

- Bihor County
  - Avenul Borțigului, 0.1 ha (0.25 acres)
  - Bears' Cave, 1 ha (2.5 acres)
  - Cârligați Peak, 10 ha (25 acres)
  - Cerbului Cave - Avenul cu Vacă, 45 ha (110 acres)
  - Cetatea Rădesei Cave, 20 ha (49 acres)
  - Cetățile Ponorului, 14.9 ha (37 acres)
  - Ciur Izbuc Cave, 0.1 ha (0.25 acres)
  - Fâneața Izvoarelor Crișul Pietros, 1 ha (2.5 acres)
  - Ghețarul Focul Viu Cave, 0.1 ha (0.25 acres)
  - Groapa de la Bârsa, 30 ha (74 acres)
  - Groapa Ruginoasa - Valea Seacă, 20.4 ha (50 acres)
  - Micula’s Cave, 0.1 ha (0.25 acres)
  - Pietrele Boghii, 38.4 ha (95 acres)

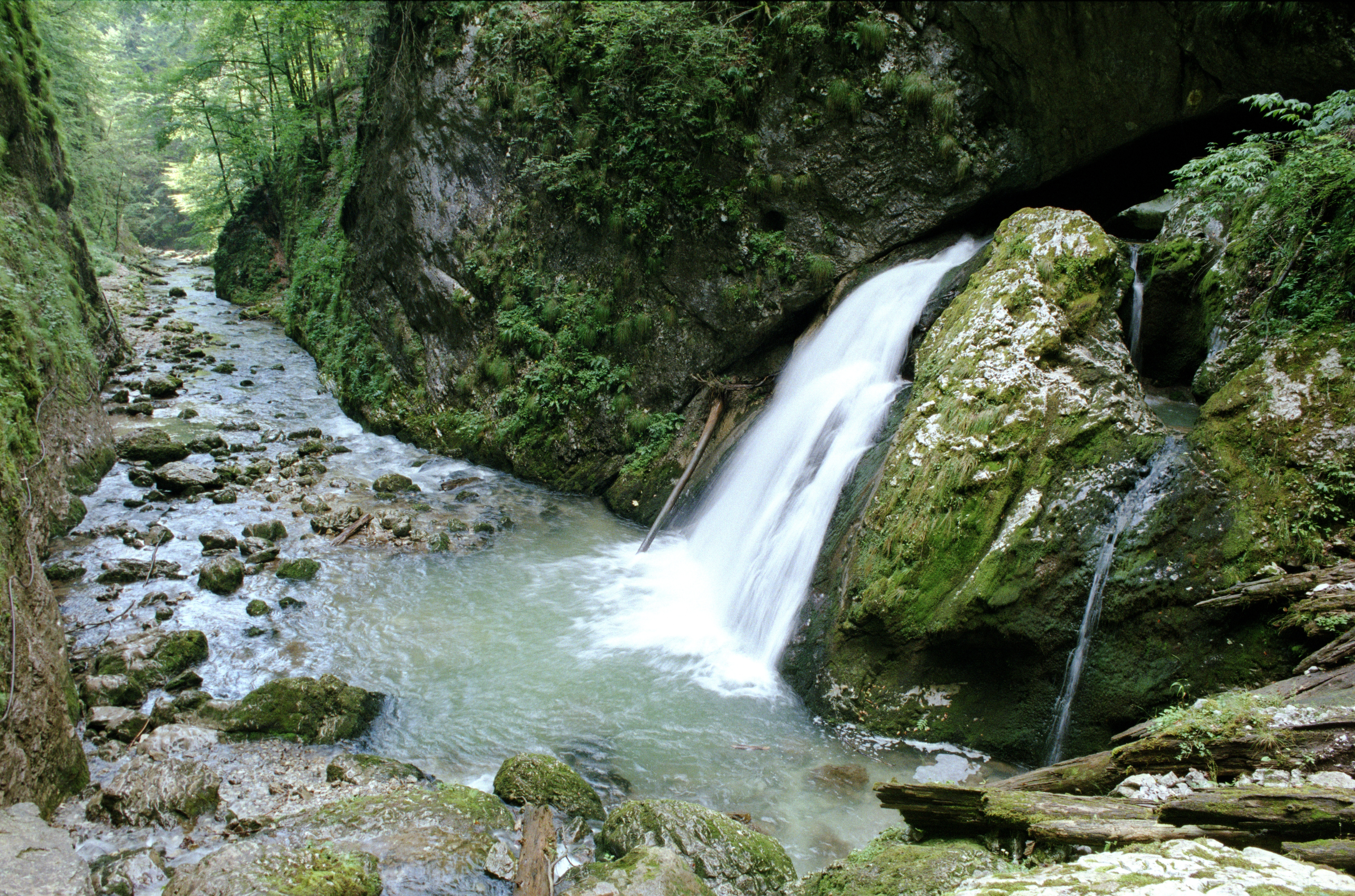
Valea Galbenei

  - Pietrele Galbenei, 6.3 ha (16 acres)
  - Platoul carstic Lumea Pierdută, 39 ha (96 acres)
  - Platoul carstic Padiș, 39 ha (96 acres)
  - Poiana Florilor, 1 ha (2.5 acres)
  - Săritoarea Bohodeiului, 32.9 ha (81 acres)
  - Smeii de la Onceasa Cave, 0.5 ha (1.2 acres)
  - Valea Galbenei, 70.5 ha (174 acres)
  - Valea Sighiștelului, 412.6 ha (1,020 acres)
  - Vârful Biserica Moțului, 3 ha (7.4 acres)
- Cluj County
  - Molhașul Mare de la Izbuc, 8 ha (20 acres)

== Rivers and lakes ==
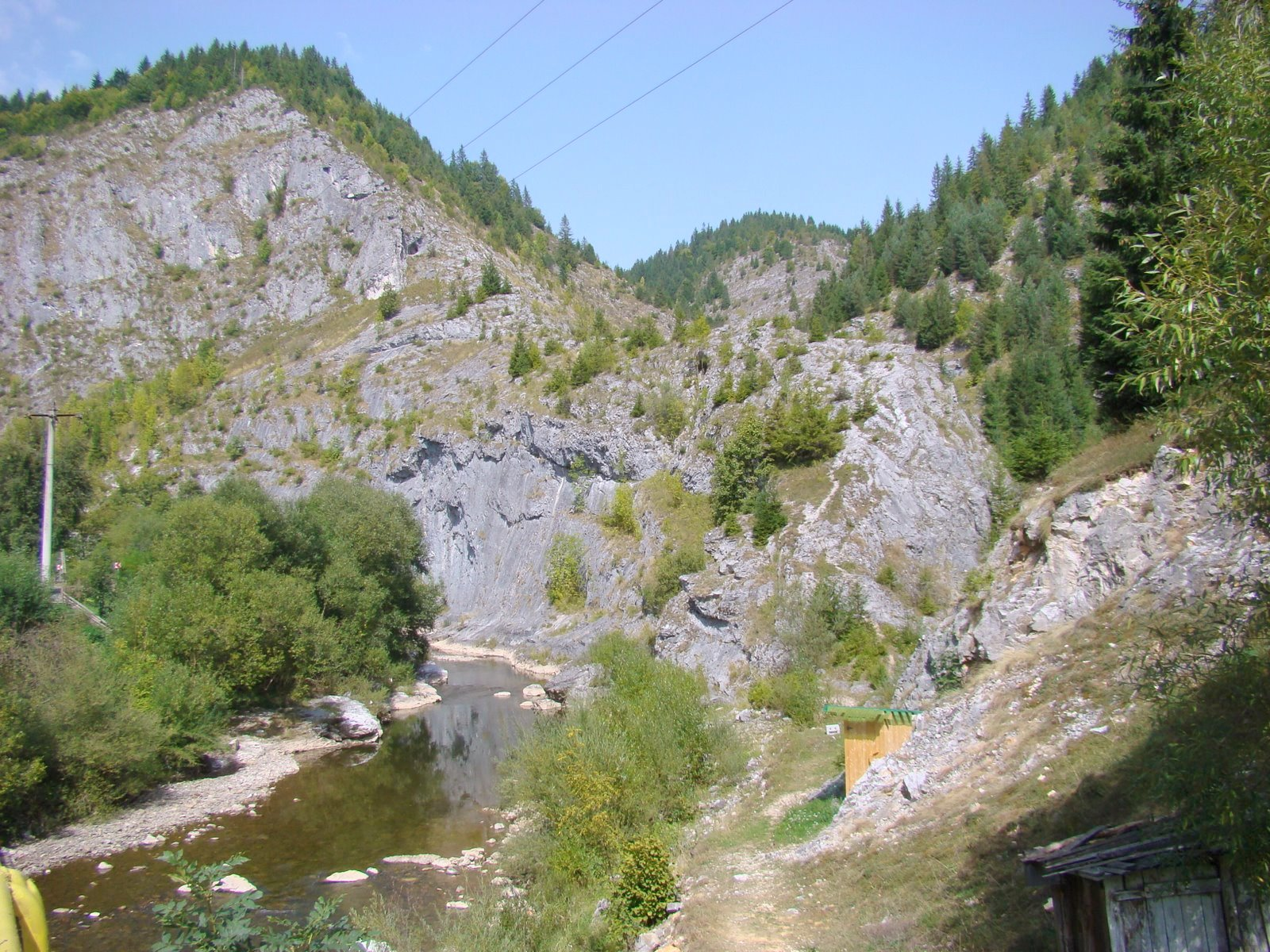
Arieșul Mare near Scărișoara

The surface waters of the Apuseni Natural Park belong to the hydrographic basins of the rivers:

- Arieșul Mare and its tributaries, Gârda Seacă, Popasele, and Cobleș.
- Someșul Mic and its left headwater, the Someșul Cald, together with the latter's tributaries, Alunul Mare, Alunul Mic, Beliș, Ponor, Valea Firii, Barna, Valea Izbucului, and Călineasa.
- Crișul Negru and its tributaries, Crișul Pietros (together with its headwater, Galbena, and its tributaries, Valea Mare Cărpinoasa and Căuși) and Crișul Băița (together with its tributaries, Hoanca Moțului and Sighiștel).

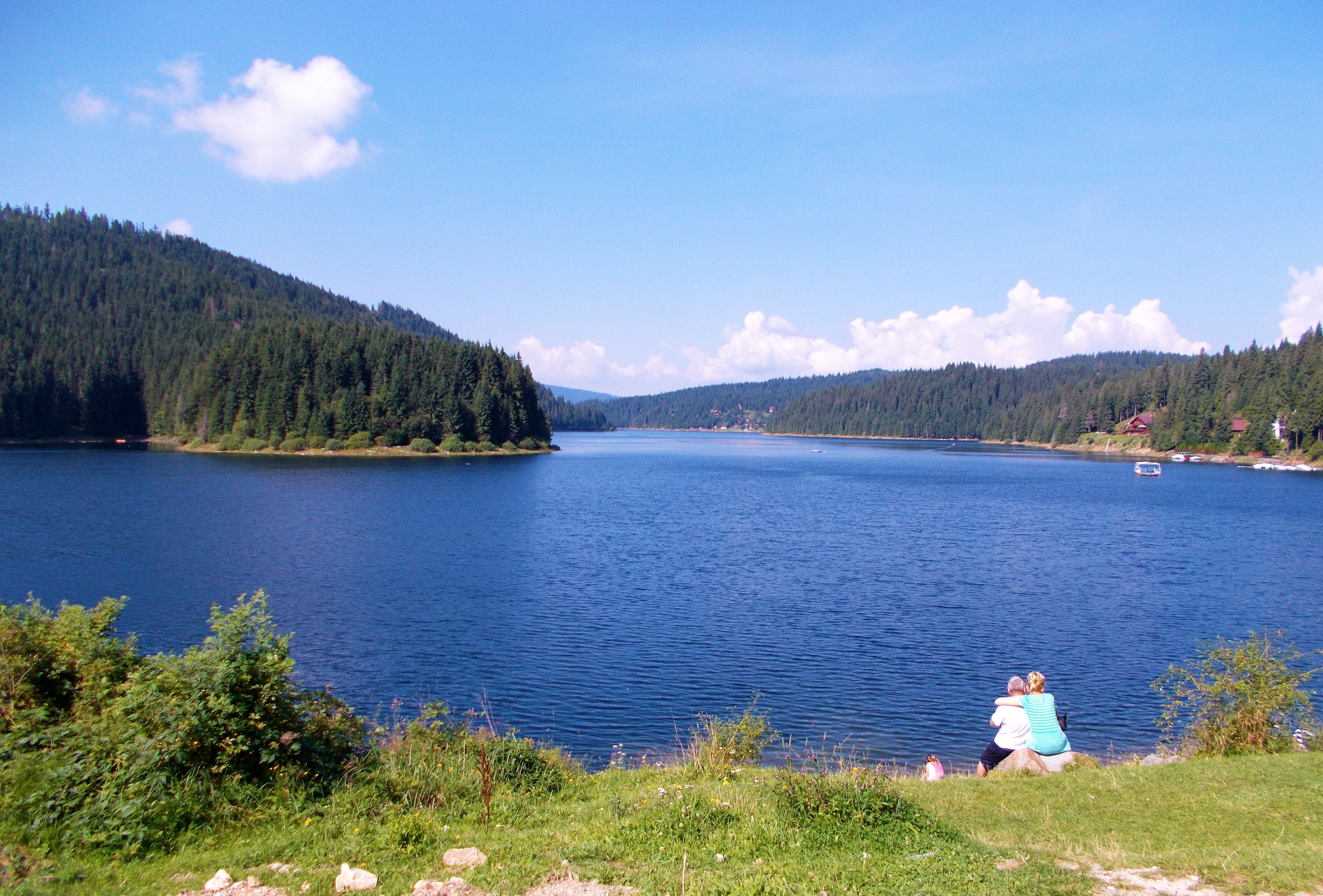
The Beliș-Fântânele Lake

In the northern part of the park, there is the Beliș-Fântânele Lake, a reservoir in the Gilău Mountains, built between 1970 and 1974. Located at an altitude of 1,050 m (3,440 ft), the reservoir covers an area of 826 ha (2,040 acres) and has a volume of 225–250 million cubic metres (0.054–0.060 mi^{3}) of water. It was formed after the damming of the Someșul Cald downstream of its confluence with the Beliș stream; the dam has a height of 92 m (302 ft) and a length of 410 m (1,350 ft). From the reservoir, the water is diverted through a 8.475 km (5.266 mi) tunnel to the turbines of the Mărișelu Hydroelectric Power Station.
