= Someșul Cald Lake =

Lake in Romania

Coordinates: 46°44′00″N 23°19′50″E

Someșul Cald Lake is part of a series of hydroelectric projects in the Someșul Cald Valley, following those located upstream: Fântânele and Tarnița. Its waters are used to drive the Kaplan-type turbine of a hydroelectric unit with an installed capacity of 12 MW, which began operating on 10 March 1983.

== Characteristics ==
Someșul Cald hydroelectric project is the third stage of the Tarnița, Someșul Cald, and Gilău cascade development. From Lake Tarnița, the water, processed by the hydroelectric plant at the base of the dam, flows through a concrete channel and, after a few hundred meters, empties into the tail end of the Someșul Cald reservoir.

The development includes the dam, the reservoir, and the hydroelectric power plant. The Someșul Cald Dam is a concrete gravity dam 33.5 m high and 130 m long at the crest.

The Someșul Cald Reservoir has a volume of 7.5 million cubic meters, a surface area of 78 hectares, and a length of 3.8 km. It serves as a backup source of drinking and industrial water for the Gilău water treatment plant, which supplies the city of Cluj-Napoca. Fish species found in the lake include: roach, perch, chub, grayling, bleak, trout, rudd, and pike.

The Someșul Cald Hydroelectric Power Plant is located at the lower part of the dam, with the hydraulic circuit infrastructure located underground; only the machine room is above ground. It is equipped with a 12 MW vertical-axis Kaplan turbine.

The operating mode depends on that of the Tarnița power plant, as the Someșul Cald Lake has limited attenuation capacity. The water processed by the hydroelectric plant located at the base of the dam flows through a concrete channel for approximately 300 meters before reaching the Gilău reservoir.
