= Mărișel =

- Commune
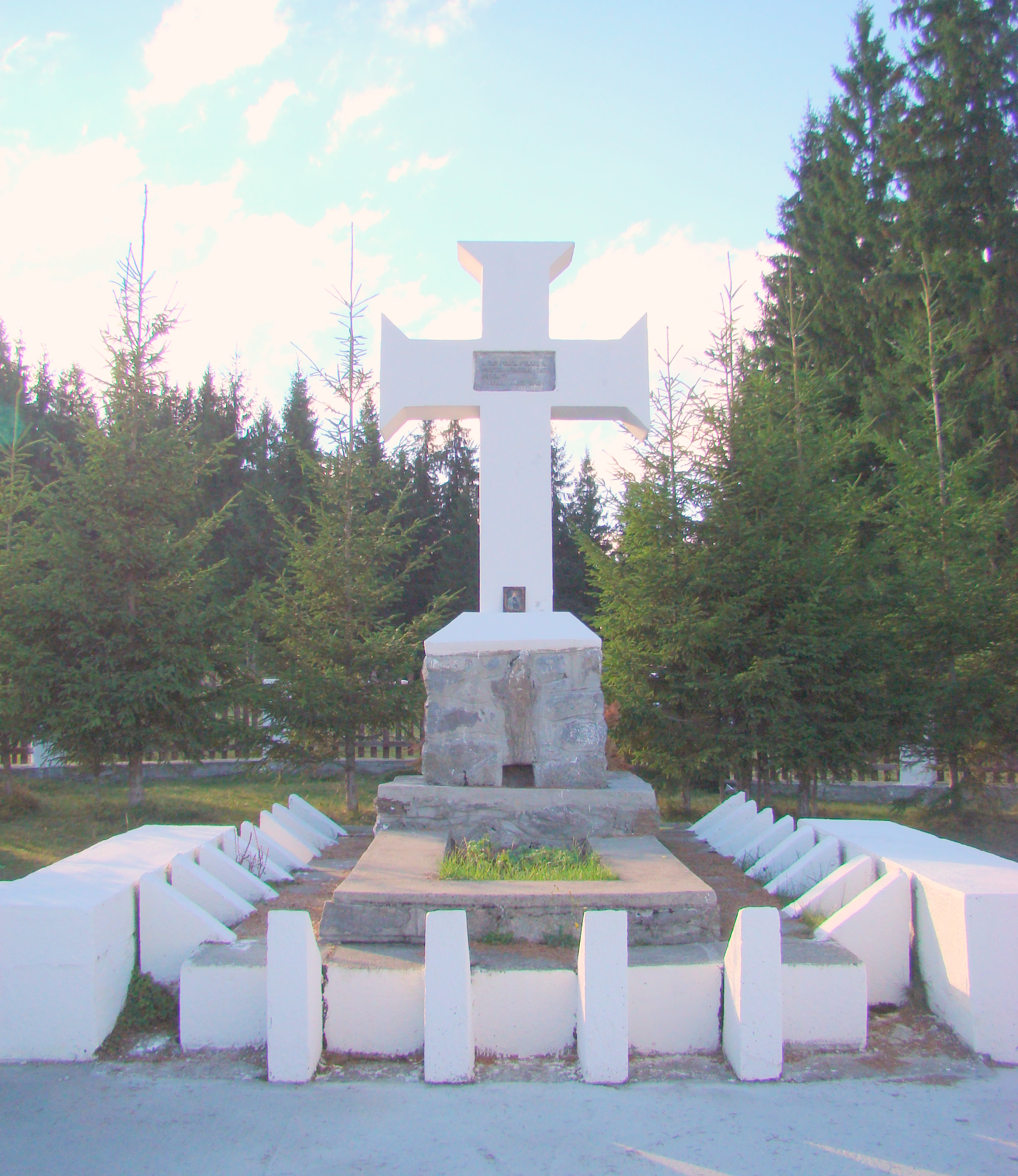
- Cross of Avram Iancu in Mărișel

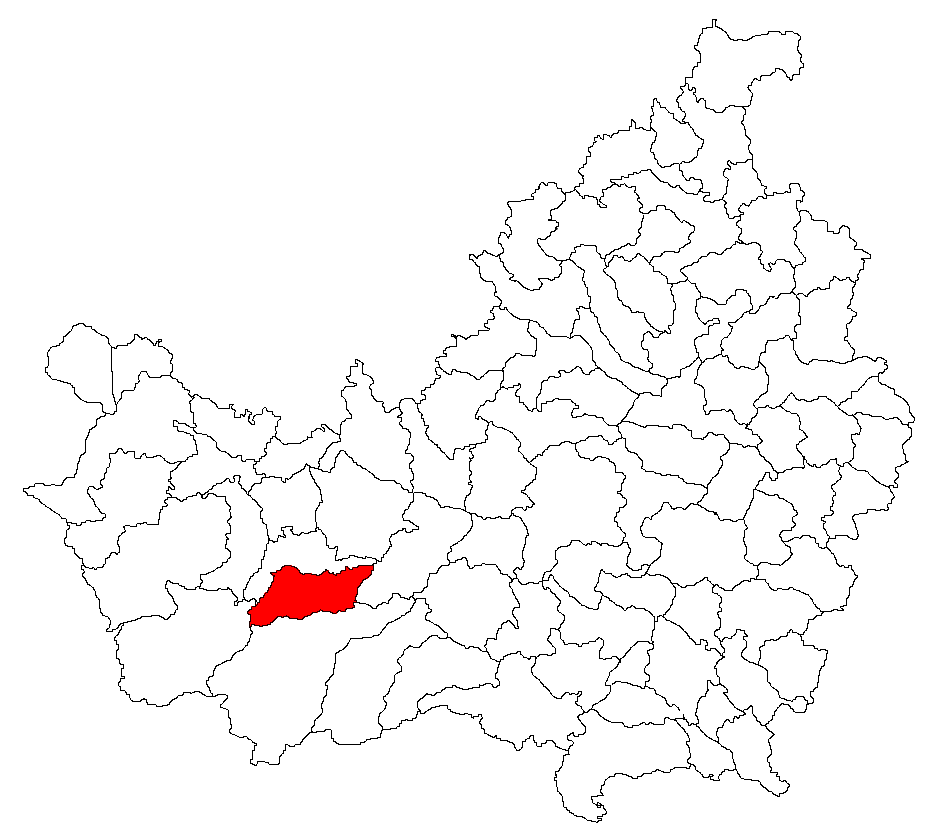
- Location in Cluj County

- Location in Romania
- Coordinates: 46°41′7″N 23°6′31″E
- Country: Romania
- County: Cluj

Government
  - Mayor (2020–2024): Viorel Ghic (PNL)
- Area: 85.94 km^{2} (33.18 sq mi)
- Elevation: 1,197 m (3,927 ft)
- Highest elevation: 1,250 m (4,100 ft)
- Lowest elevation: 1,150 m (3,770 ft)
- Population (2021-12-01): 1,499
  - Density: 17.44/km^{2} (45.18/sq mi)
- Time zone: UTC+02:00 (EET)
  - Summer (DST): UTC+03:00 (EEST)
- Postal code: 407390
- Area code: (+40) 0264
- Vehicle reg.: CJ
- Website: primariamarisel.ro

Mărișel (Hungarian: Havasnagyfalu; German: Marischel) is a commune in Cluj County, Transylvania, Romania. It is composed of a single village, Mărișel.

The commune is situated in the northern reaches of the Apuseni Mountains, at the eastern edge of the Apuseni Natural Park, at an altitude of about 1,200 m (3,900 ft). It is located in the western part of Cluj County, 40 km (25 mi) south of Huedin and 50 km (31 mi) west of the county seat, Cluj-Napoca. Mărișel borders the following communes: Măguri-Răcătău to the south, Râșca to the north, Gilău to the east, and Beliș to the west.

The Mărișelu Hydroelectric Power Station is located on the administrative territory of the commune.

== Demographics ==
Historical population
Year	Pop.	±%
1850	813	—
1880	1,869	+129.9%
1890	2,156	+15.4%
1900	2,076	−3.7%
1910	2,202	+6.1%
1920	2,423	+10.0%
1930	2,430	+0.3%
1941	2,768	+13.9%
1956	2,458	−11.2%
1966	2,473	+0.6%
1977	2,820	+14.0%
1992	1,951	−30.8%
2002	1,670	−14.4%
2011	1,468	−12.1%
2021	1,499	+2.1%
Source: Census data

At the census from 2011 there were 1,468 people living in the commune; of those, 99.99% were ethnic Romanians. According to the 2021 census, the population had increased to 1,499, with 92.26% Romanians.

== Natives ==
- Pelaghia Roșu (1800 – 1870), revolutionary who participated in the Transylvanian Revolution of 1848–1849
