= Tarnița =

Tarnița may refer to:

- Lake Tarnița, a reservoir located between the communes of Râșca, Mărișel, and Gilău, in Cluj County, Romania
  - Tarnița, a river dam and sunken village, with only a small colony left in Gilău Commune, Cluj County
- Tarnița, a village in Oncești Commune, Bacău County
- Tarnița, a village in Pârjol Commune, Bacău County
- Tarnița, a village in Buceș Commune, Hunedoara County
- Tarnița, a village in Dagâța Commune, Iași County
- Tarnița, a tributary of the Haita in Suceava County, Romania
- Tarnița, a tributary of the Sădurel in Sibiu County, Romania
- Tarnița – Lăpuștești Hydroelectric Power Station, a large hydroelectric pumped-storage project on the Someșul Cald River in Cluj County, Romania
