= Apa Caldă =

- Location within Romania

Location
- Country: Romania
- Counties: Cluj County

Physical characteristics
- Source: Apuseni Mountains
- Mouth: Beliș
  - coordinates: 46.5914°N 22.9138°E
- Length: 8 km (5.0 mi)
- Basin size: 31 km^{2} (12 sq mi)

Basin features
- Progression: Beliș→ Someșul Cald→ Someșul Mic→ Someș→ Tisza→ Danube→ Black Sea
- Tributaries
  - right: Pietroasa

The Apa Caldă is a right tributary of the river Beliș in Romania. It flows into the Beliș in Poiana Horea. Its length is 8 km (5.0 mi) and its basin size is 31 km^{2} (12 sq mi).
