= Râșca (Someș) =

- Location within Romania

Location
- Country: Romania
- Counties: Cluj County
- Villages: Râșca

Physical characteristics
- Source: Gilău Mountains
- Mouth: Someșul Cald
  - location: Lake Tarnița
  - coordinates: 46.7182°N 23.2680°E
- Length: 20 km (12 mi)
- Basin size: 59 km^{2} (23 sq mi)

Basin features
- Progression: Someșul Cald→ Someșul Mic→ Someș→ Tisza→ Danube→ Black Sea

The Râșca is a left tributary of the river Someșul Cald in Romania. It discharges into the Lake Tarnița, which is drained by the Someșul Cald. Its length is 20 km (12 mi) and its basin size is 59 km^{2} (23 sq mi).
