= Agârbiciu =

Agârbiciu may refer to several places in Romania:

- Agârbiciu, a village in Căpușu Mare Commune, Cluj County
- Agârbiciu, a village in Axente Sever Commune, Sibiu County
- Agârbiciu (river), a tributary of the Someșul Cald in Cluj County
