= Alunul Mic Cave =

Coordinates: 46.6383°N 22.7727°E

The Alunul Mic Cave (Romanian: Peștera Alunul Mic) is a cave of national importance in Apuseni Natural Park, Bihor County, Romania. It is the source of the Alunul Mic, a tributary of the Someșul Cald.
