= Avram Iancu =

Transylvanian lawyer and revolutionary (1824–1872)

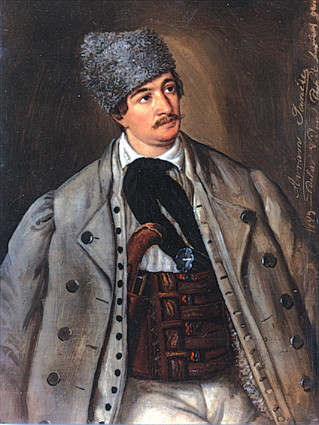

Personal details
- Born: 1824 Vidra de Sus, Grand Principality of Transylvania
- Died: 10 September 1872 (aged 48) Baia de Criș, Lands of the Crown of Saint Stephen
- Profession: Lawyer
- Known for: Transylvanian Revolution
- Nickname: Crăișorul Munților ("The Prince of the Mountains")

Military service
- Allegiance: Transylvanian Romanians; Austrian Empire
- Battles/wars: Transylvanian Revolution

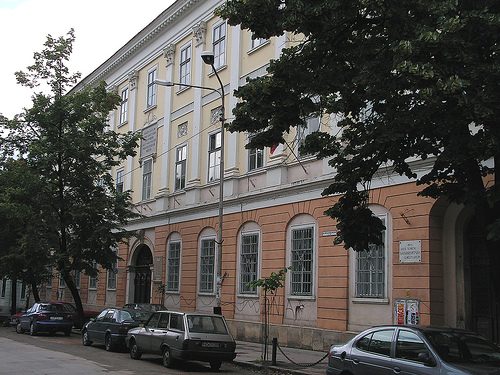
The former Piarist College of Cluj, today the Báthory István Líceum

Avram Iancu (Romanian: [aˈvram ˈjaŋku]; 1824 – 10 September 1872) was a Transylvanian Romanian lawyer who played an important role in the local chapter of the Austrian Empire Revolutions of 1848–1849. He was especially active in the Țara Moților region and the Apuseni Mountains. The rallying of peasants around him, as well as the allegiance he paid to the Habsburg monarchy, earned him the moniker Crăișorul Munților ("The Prince of the Mountains").

== Early life ==
Avram Iancu was born in Vidra de Sus (currently Avram Iancu, Alba County), Transylvania, then part of the Austrian Empire, into a family of peasants that had been emancipated from serfdom. His father was Alisandru Iancu (1787–1855) and his mother was Maria Gligor. He had one elder brother, Ion (born 1822), who became a priest.

Iancu's grandfather was Gheorghe Iancu (deceased before 1812), who had four girls and three boys, including Alisandru. Little is known about Iancu's childhood. Local tradition holds that he had a typical moț character, joyful and witty, and that he had a musical talent, playing the leaf, alphorn, flute, and violin.

Iancu attended primary school in his village, in the Târsa hamlet, and then at Neagra (now Poiana Vadului). He later attended school in Câmpeni, Alba County, from where he graduated at age 13.

After this, he went to Zlatna, where he studied in a Hungarian school, in the Latin language, as there were no Romanian schools in this area. His teachers were Iozephus Stanken (1837–1838), Gregorius Iakabus (1838–1839) and Ludovicus Kovács (1839–1840 and 1840–1841). He graduated at age 17. He studied humanities from 1841, in the Piarist College of Cluj, graduating law school. Although he came from an Eastern Orthodox family, Iancu joined the Romanian Greek Catholic Church during his high school years.

== Initial stages of 1848 Revolutions ==
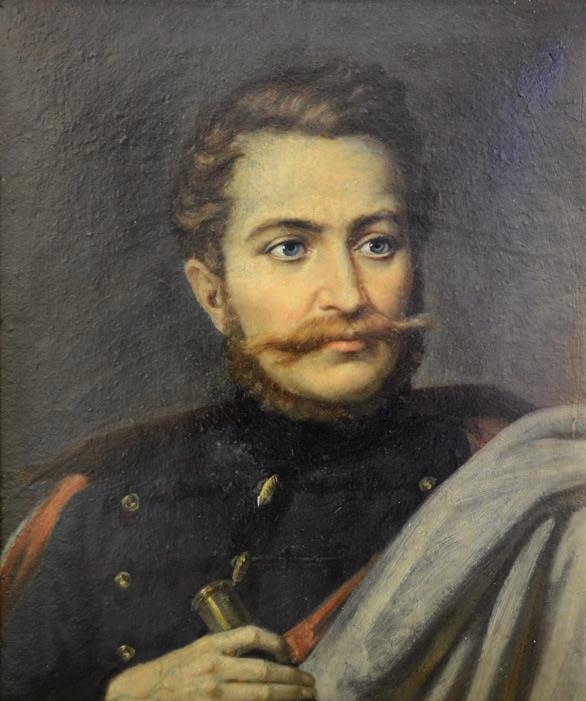
Portrait of Iancu by Mișu Popp, undated

Iancu became a law clerk in Târgu Mureș, and it was there that he learned about the events of March 1848 in Vienna and Pest. His attitude at the time showed the nature of the conflict that was to engulf Transylvania: while Iancu welcomed the transition, he was indignant that Hungarian revolutionaries (many of whom were landowners) refused to debate the abolition of serfdom (which at the time was the state of the majority of the Romanian population in Transylvania).

In the Apuseni Mountains, he started rallying peasants in Câmpeni. The protests he organized were recognized as peaceful by the authorities, but nevertheless worried them. Iancu and his associate Ioan Buteanu quickly became the main figures of the Romanian-led actions in the area, especially after they took part in the Blaj Assemblies starting in April, where over 40,000 Romanians met to protest against Transylvania becoming part of Hungary. In Blaj (Hungarian: Balázsfalva; German: Blasendorf) both opted for the main, radical wing of the movement. Centered on Alexandru Papiu Ilarian, the group opposed the Hungarian revolutionary option of uniting Transylvania and Hungary. It got into conflict with the minority wing around Greek-Catholic Bishop Ioan Lemeni, which chose not to boycott the elections for the Hungarian Parliament.

While the union was carried of on 30 May 1848, the majority of Romanian activists looked towards Vienna and Emperor Ferdinand, sharing the cause of the Transylvanian Saxons. Things became heated after 11 July, when Hungary declared its independence. Austria started to open itself to the Romanian demands, while bloody conflicts ensued between the Hungarian nobles and their Romanian serfs. The last Assembly in Blaj saw the Habsburg governor, Anton Freiherr von Puchner, approve of the arming of National Guards for Romanians and Saxons. On 27 September, the lynching of Austrian plenipotentiary Count Lamberg by a Pest crowd cut off any dialogue between the two centers. The new Emperor Franz Joseph and the Austrian government granted the Romanians numerous liberties and rights; although Lajos Kossuth's government abolished serfdom, this was no longer a match for the Imperial offer.

== Conflict ==
Transylvanian Revolution
- Part of the Hungarian Revolution of 1848 and the 1848–1849 massacres in Transylvania
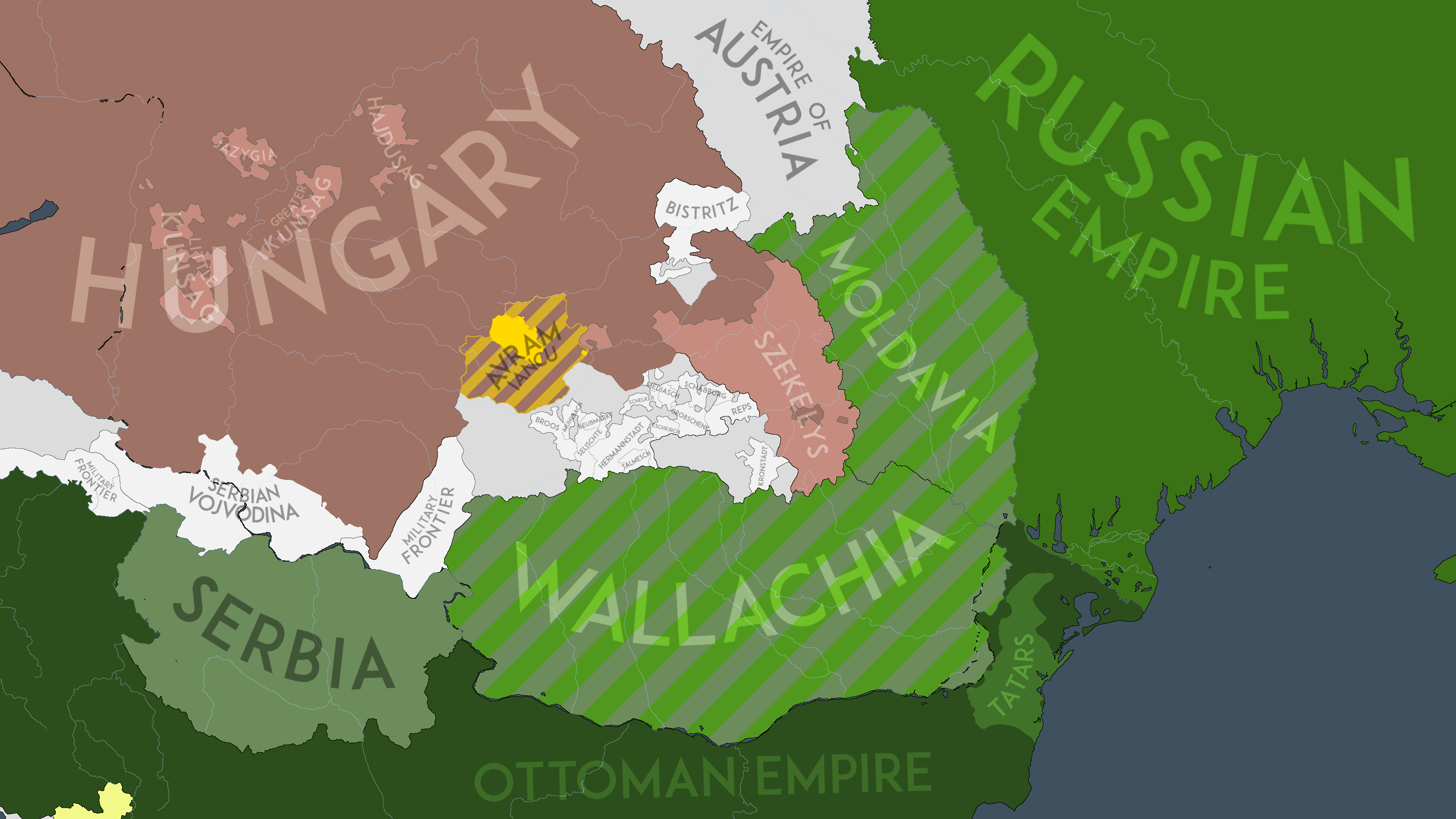
Date	8 November 1848 – 29 July 1849
Location	Grand Principality of Transylvania, Austrian Empire, now Transylvania, Romania
Result	Austro-Romanian victory

Belligerents
Transylvanian Romanians Supported by: Russian Empire; Austrian Empire	Hungarian State; Polish volunteers

Commanders and leaders
Avram Iancu; Alexander von Lüders	Imre Hatvany; Józef Bem

Strength
4,000 troops of the "Auraria Gemina" Legion 10,000 Russians	10,000–32,000

Casualties and losses
Unknown, but minimal	5,500(can be higher)

=== Outbreak ===
The Austrians clearly rejected the October demand that ethnic criteria become the basis for internal borders, with the goal of creating a province for Romanians (Transylvania grouped alongside Banat and Bukovina), as they did not want to replace the threat of Hungarian nationalism with the potential of Romanian separatism. Yet they did not declare themselves hostile to the rapid creation of Romanian administrative offices within Transylvania.

The territory was organized in prefecturi ("prefectures"), with Iancu and Buteanu as two prefects in the Apuseni. Iancu's prefecture, the Auraria Gemina (a name charged with Latin symbolism), became the most important one as it took over from bordering areas that were never fully organized.

In the same month, the administrative efforts were halted, as Hungarians under Józef Bem carried out a sweeping offensive through Transylvania. With the discreet assistance of Imperial Russian troops, the Austrian army (except for the garrisons at Alba Iulia and Deva) and the Austrian-Romanian administration retreated to Wallachia and Wallachian Oltenia (both were, at the time, under Russia's occupation).

=== Attrition ===
On 8 November, Iancu, along with his 4,000 combatants of the "Auraria Gemina" Legion, took part in joint military actions with Austrian forces. The Legion reached Turda, and the city surrendered without a fight on 20 November. Then, he and his troops returned to the mountains. On 29 November, Iancu had another 1,500 troops mobilized for action. On 4 December, he reached Săcuieu, and on 6–7 December, he and his men were ordered to attack the enemy lines by surprise. However, the attack failed due to the incompetence of an Austrian officer, and the Romanians were forced to withdraw by 10 December. By early January 1849, the control over Transylvania was almost entirely regained by the Hungarian army. The Romanian fighters holding out in their mountain stronghold were running low on supplies, having only 800 rifles to arm a few thousand men, and were completely surrounded by Hungarian troops by the end of March.

By February and March 1849, numerous attacks launched by the Hungarians ended in failure. Among these were the two battles of Mărișel, the first one fought in February and the second one in March. The first, fought against a Hungarian detachment of 600 soldiers, ended in their defeat. Their losses amounted to 13 dead and many wounded, who had to be loaded onto 4 carts and brought to Gilău, while the Romanians lost 6 dead. Wanting to wash away the shame brought by this defeat, the Hungarian military commander of the Gilău garrison sent an even larger force in March, made up of 1,600 soldiers. The Romanians under Iancu received support from the women of Mărișel, led by Pelaghia Roșu. With their combined help, the Hungarians were routed. They lost 30 dead on the battlefield, including a captain and a sergeant major, and another 100 drowned in the Someș River, while their many wounded were loaded onto 6 carts. The Romanians only had 2–3 men wounded.

In April 1849, Iancu was approached by the Hungarian envoy Ioan Dragoș (in fact, a Romanian deputy in the Hungarian Parliament). Dragoș appeared to have been acting out of his own desire for peace, since Iancu's troops were tying down too many Hungarian troops: about 10,000, a third of its army in Transylvania, according to Hungarian general János Czetz. He worked hard to get the Romanian leaders to meet him in Abrud and listen to the Hungarian demands. Iancu's direct adversary, Hungarian commander Imre Hatvany, seems to have taken advantage of the provisional armistice to attack the Romanians in Abrud. He did not, however, benefit from a surprise, as Iancu and his men retreated and then encircled him. Meanwhile, Dragoș was lynched by the Abrud crowds, in the belief that he was part of Hatvany's ruse.

Hatvany also angered the Romanians by having Buteanu captured and murdered. While his position became weaker, he was permanently attacked by Iancu's men until the major defeat of 22 May. Hatvany and most of his armed group were massacred by their adversaries, as Iancu captured their cannons, switching the tactical advantage for the next months. Hatvany's troops lost 5,000 soldiers and all of their artillery. Kossuth was angered by Hatvany's gesture (an inspection of the time dismissed all of Hatvany's close collaborators), especially since it made future negotiations unlikely.

On 8 June, the Romanian stronghold in the mountains was attacked by the largest Hungarian force yet: 4,000 men supported by 19 cannons led by General Farkas Kemény. The battle lasted between 11 and 17 June and ended in a crushing victory for the Romanians, the Hungarians having at least 500 troops killed during the battle. The Hungarian historian and philosopher Pál Vasvári, with a force of 3,000 men and 5 cannons, was killed on 6 July 1849 during an engagement with Romanian forces under the tribunes Nicolau Corcheș and Iacob Olteanu, and local forces of Mărișel under the centurion Indrei (Andrei) Roșu, the son of Pelaghia Roșu. They had 440–500 men under their command, only 123 of whom had rifles, in the Apuseni Mountains, in the area between present-day Mărișel and Fântânele, Cluj County. The battle cost the Hungarians between 800 and 850 dead soldiers and many wounded, with many of their officers and Vasvári himself killed. The Romanians captured 1 cannon, a lot of ammunition, and a considerable number of different weapons. Their losses were 4 dead and 12 wounded. The exact location of his death remains disputed among historical sources.

The Russian intervention in June precipitated events, especially since Poles fighting in the Hungarian revolutionary contingents wanted to see an all-out resistance to the Tsarist armies. People like Henryk Dembiński mediated for an understanding between Kossuth and the Wallachian émigré revolutionaries. The latter, understandably close to Avram Iancu (especially Nicolae Bălcescu, Gheorghe Magheru, Alexandru G. Golescu, and Ion Ghica), were also keen to inflict a defeat on the Russian armies that had crushed their movement in September 1848. Fighting also continued in July, during the peace negotiations, on 2, 4, and 22 July, all Hungarian attacks being repulsed yet again. Finally, the conflict ended on 29 July, as Iancu offered a guarantee to the Hungarian troops that he would not attack them, allowing them to withdraw in front of the Austro-Russian offensive.

=== Negotiations ===
Bălcescu and Kossuth met in May 1849, in Debrecen. The contact has long been celebrated by Romanian Marxist historians and politicians: Karl Marx's condemnation of everything opposing Kossuth had led to any Romanian initiative being automatically considered "reactionary". In fact, it appears that the agreement was in no way a pact: Kossuth meant to flatter the Wallachians by getting them to champion the idea of Iancu's armies leaving Transylvania for good, in order to help Bălcescu in Bucharest. While agreeing to mediate for peace, Bălcescu never presented these terms to the fighters in the Apuseni Mountains. His personal documents (commented by Liviu Maior) show that the unrealistic assumptions of Kossuth had made him view the Hungarian leader as a demagogue.

Even more contradictory, the only thing Iancu agreed to (and which no party had asked for) was his forces' neutrality in the conflict between Russia and Hungary. Thus, he secured his position as the Hungarian armies suffered defeats in July, culminating in the Battle of Segesvár (Sighișoara), and then the capitulation of 13 August.

== Later years ==
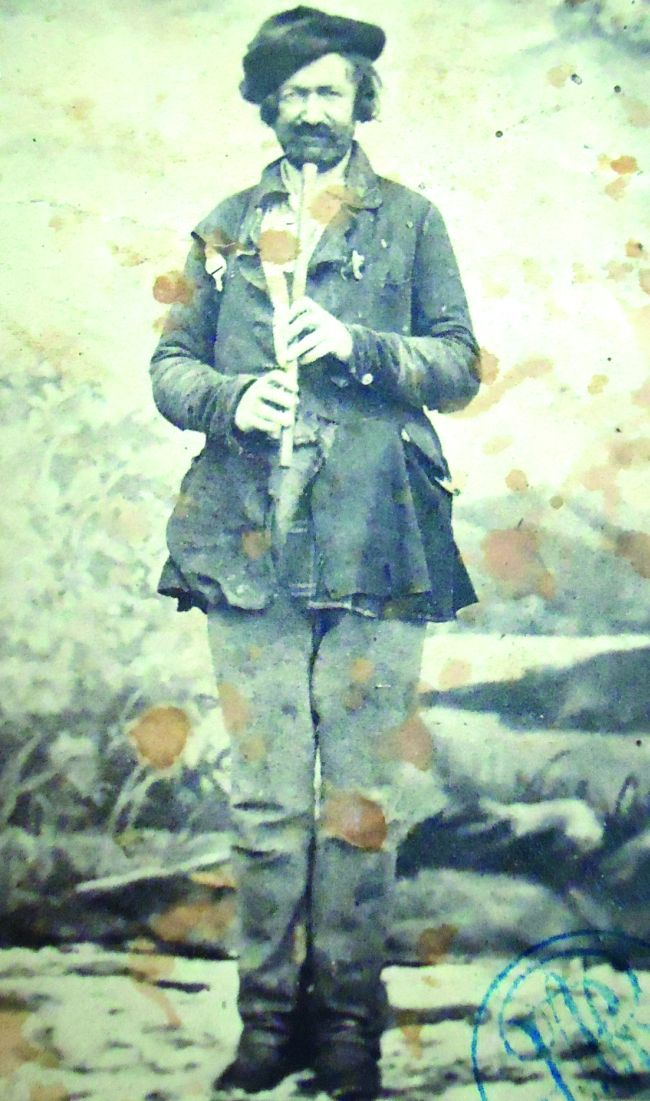
Iancu in his later years, after his nervous breakdown

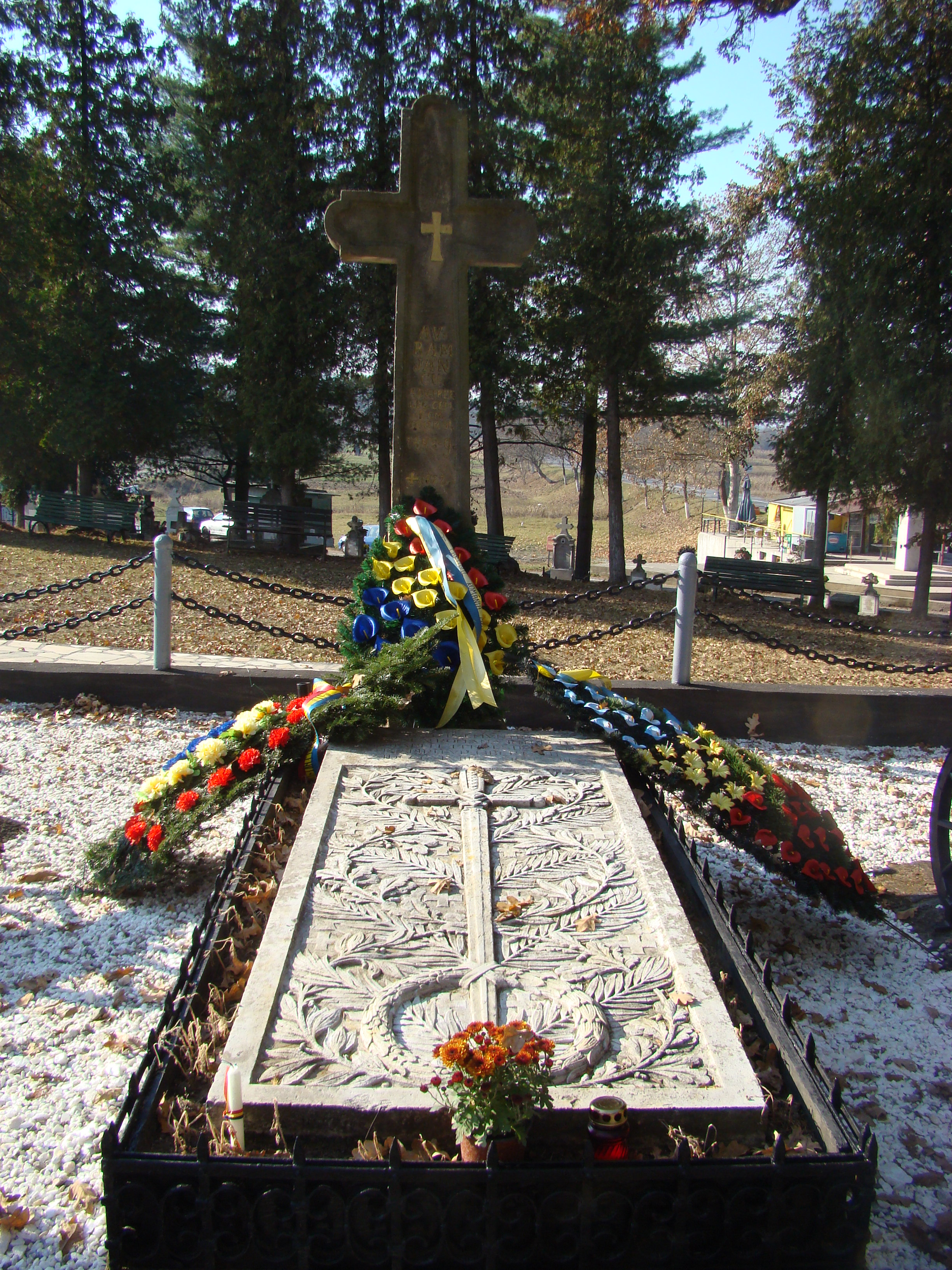
Iancu's tomb in Țebea

Iancu agreed to disarm as soon as the Austrians took over, and in 1850, he wrote a detailed report to the new Governor of Transylvania, General Ludwig von Wohlgemuth. In order to avoid suspicion of Romanian separatism, the document does not mention the contacts with the Wallachians. As the Austrians granted the abolition of serfdom, they also forbade all representative institutions in Transylvania. While Hungarian nationalism was slowly fitting in the pattern that would make the Ausgleich acceptable for both sides involved, the Romanian option caused increasing irritation. The revolutionary zeal it had found under Iancu, although profiting the monarchy, could also prove to be a weapon used for very different goals (the Austrians were especially fearful that the Orthodox faith of the Romanians would accommodate itself with Pan-Slavism, completing the gap between Serbia and the Russian Empire).

It is very possible that Iancu was not able to properly observe the new status quo. While the decision for his initial arrest (in December 1849) was quickly overturned after local protests (and explained as an abuse), he was censored throughout his life, had his library confiscated, and was placed under surveillance. He was arrested a second time, in 1852, after it was presumed that his presence alone served to inflame local sentiments. Local traditions hold that the emperor Franz Joseph was visiting Transylvania and on 21 July 1852, he was in the Apuseni Mountains area, purportedly to attend The Maidens' Fair on Găina Mountain but also hoping that Iancu would agree to meet him. Allegedly, Iancu refused, uttering his famous line "It's all for naught, a madman and a liar can't by any means come to understand each other". Soon after his release, Iancu visited Vienna and attempted to petition the Emperor. He was prevented to do so by the police, a public humiliation which provoked a nervous breakdown that had an impact on the rest of his life. He was marginalized by the authorities who did not allow Romanians to have their own say in Transylvania about their autonomy. Being treated as peripheral by the people in power, he spent the rest of his life traveling the Apuseni Mountains, as a half-mad vagrant, living out of whatever alms that the impoverished moți population could spare for him, singing sad Romanian doina songs on his flute.

Iancu died on 10 September 1872, at Baia de Criș. His body was buried, according to his wish, under Horea's tree in Țebea (by tradition, the place where the Revolt of Horea, Cloșca, and Crișan had started). The sobor of 36 priests at his funeral was led by the Orthodox archpriest Nicolae Mihaltanu of Baia Criș, together with Simion Balint, the Greek Catholic archpriest of Roșia Montană.

Avram Iancu was officially declared a Hero of the Romanian Nation in November 2016 by the Parliament of Romania and President Klaus Iohannis. The international airport serving the city of Cluj-Napoca has been named in his honor.

== See also ==
- List of revolutions and rebellions
- List of rebellions in the Habsburg monarchy
