= Gilău =

Gilău may refer to:

- Gilău, Cluj, a commune in Cluj County, Romania
- Gilău Mountains, a portion of the Bihor Massif, a mountain range in the Apuseni Mountains in Transylvania, Romania, belonging to the Western Romanian Carpathians
