= Tarnița – Lăpuștești Hydroelectric Power Station =

Tarnița–Lăpuștești Hydroelectric Power Station
- Location within Romania
- Country: Romania
- Location: Lăpuștești, Râșca, Cluj County
- Coordinates: 46°43′16″N 23°15′21″E
- Status: project
- Construction cost: Estimated €1.3 billion (US$1.5 billion)

Dam and spillways
- Impounds: Someșul Cald River
- Website www.hidrotarnita.ro

The Tarnița–Lăpuștești Hydropower Plant is a proposed hydroelectric pumped-storage project on the Someșul Cald River in Cluj County, Romania. If built it would be the largest hydro-electric load balancing system in Romania. During the night, when the demand is low and electricity is cheap because of powerplants which generate electricity continuously, such as the Cernavodă nuclear power plant, it will use electricity to pump water up the hill, while during the day, it will use the hydro energy to generate electricity.

== Location ==
The Tarnița–Lăpuștești power station will be located 35 km (22 mi) from Cluj Napoca, on the left bank of the Someşul Cald River valley in the area of the existing Lake Tarnița and the Lăpuștești village, in Râșca commune.

== Power generation ==
The power station will have four turbines, each capable of producing 250 megawatts, for a total of 1000 megawatts.

== Schedule ==
Construction has not started. The Romanian state is looking for investors. The strategic environmental assessment (SEA) procedure is at the beginning, the environmental impact assessment (EIA) procedure did not start yet, as the project consultants admitted publicly on 17 November 2010. In 2016 the Romanian government stated that several smaller projects were being considered instead. In 2019, Romania’s Forecast and Strategy National Committee (CNSP) started a procedure for finding a private partner for the Tarnița–Lăpuștești pumped-storage hydropower plant.

== See also ==
- Hydro-electricity
- Iron Gate I Hydro Power Plant
- Lotru-Ciunget Hydropower Plant
