= Bătrâna (Someșul Cald) =

- Location within Romania

Location
- Country: Romania
- Counties: Bihor County, Cluj County

Physical characteristics
- Source
  - location: Bihor Mountains
- Mouth: Someșul Cald
  - coordinates: 46.6182°N 22.8015°E
- Length: 8 km (5.0 mi)
- Basin size: 37 km^{2} (14 sq mi)

Basin features
- Progression: Someșul Cald→ Someșul Mic→ Someș→ Tisza→ Danube→ Black Sea
- Tributaries
  - right: Călineasa

The Bătrâna is a right tributary of the river Someșul Cald in Romania. It flows into the Someșul Cald near Smida. Its length is 8 km (5.0 mi) and its basin size is 37 km^{2} (14 sq mi).
