= Beliș (river) =

- Location within Romania

Location
- Country: Romania
- Counties: Cluj County
- Villages: Poiana Horea

Physical characteristics
- Source: Apuseni Mountains
- Mouth: Someșul Cald
  - location: Lake Fântânele
  - coordinates: 46.658°N 23.023°E

Basin features
- Progression: Someșul Cald→ Someșul Mic→ Someș→ Tisza→ Danube→ Black Sea
- Tributaries
  - left: Țiclău
  - right: Apa Caldă

The Beliș is a right tributary of the river Someșul Cald in Romania. Near the village Beliș it discharges into the Lake Fântânele, which is drained by the Someșul Cald. Its length is 14 km (8.7 mi) and its basin size is 88 km^{2} (34 sq mi). Its main tributaries are the Apa Caldă and the Țiclău. Other tributaries are the Pârâul Roșu, Valea Călineasa, Fulgerata, Ciurtuci, Pârâul Potrii, Valea Vijanului, Olteanu and Monoșel.
