= Pelaghia Roșu =

Romanian revolutionary

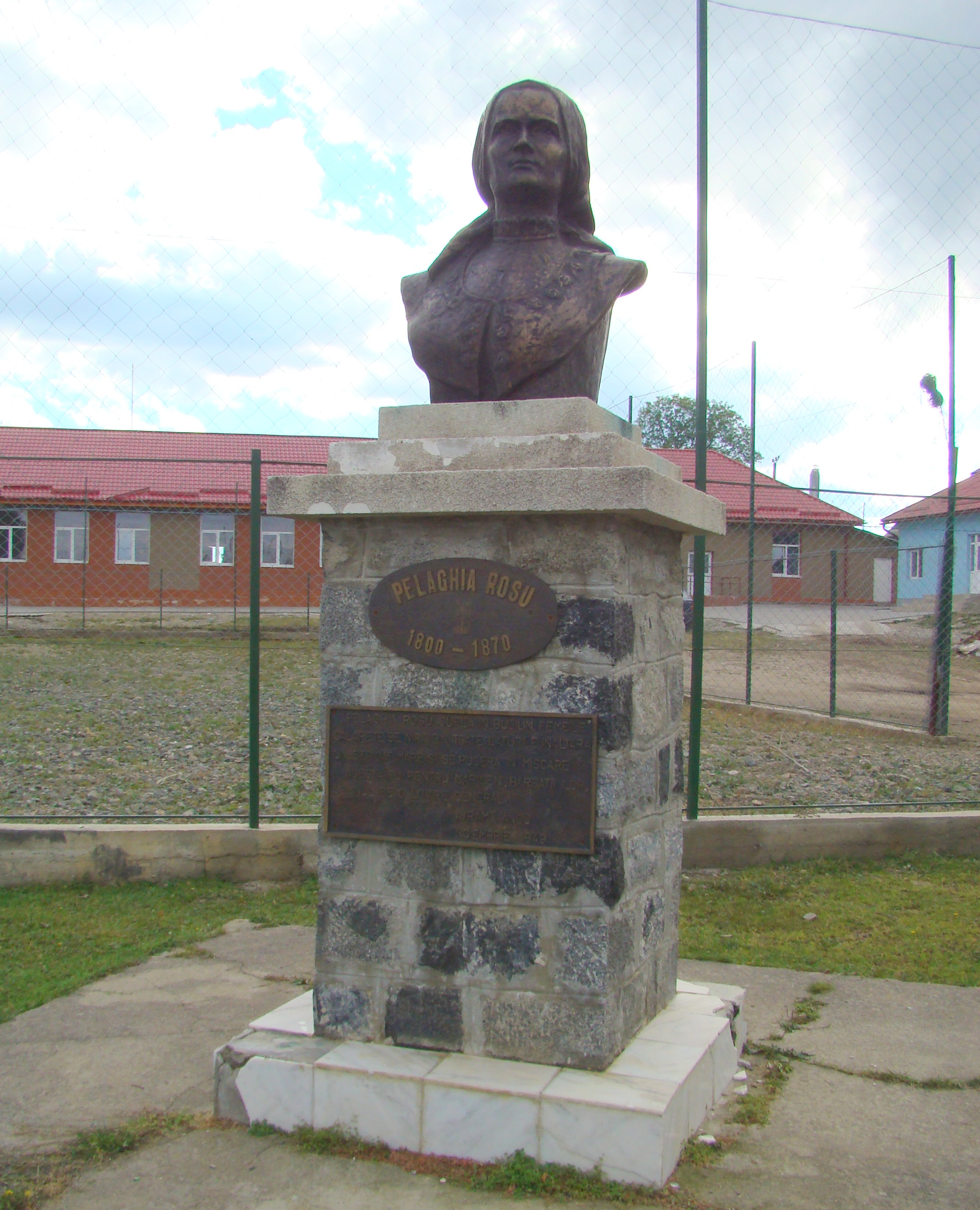
Bust of Pelaghia Roșu in Mărișel

Pelaghia Roșu (1800 – 10 June 1870) was a Romanian revolutionary who participated in the Transylvanian Revolution of 1848–1849. In March 1849, she commanded a battalion of women in defense of her village.

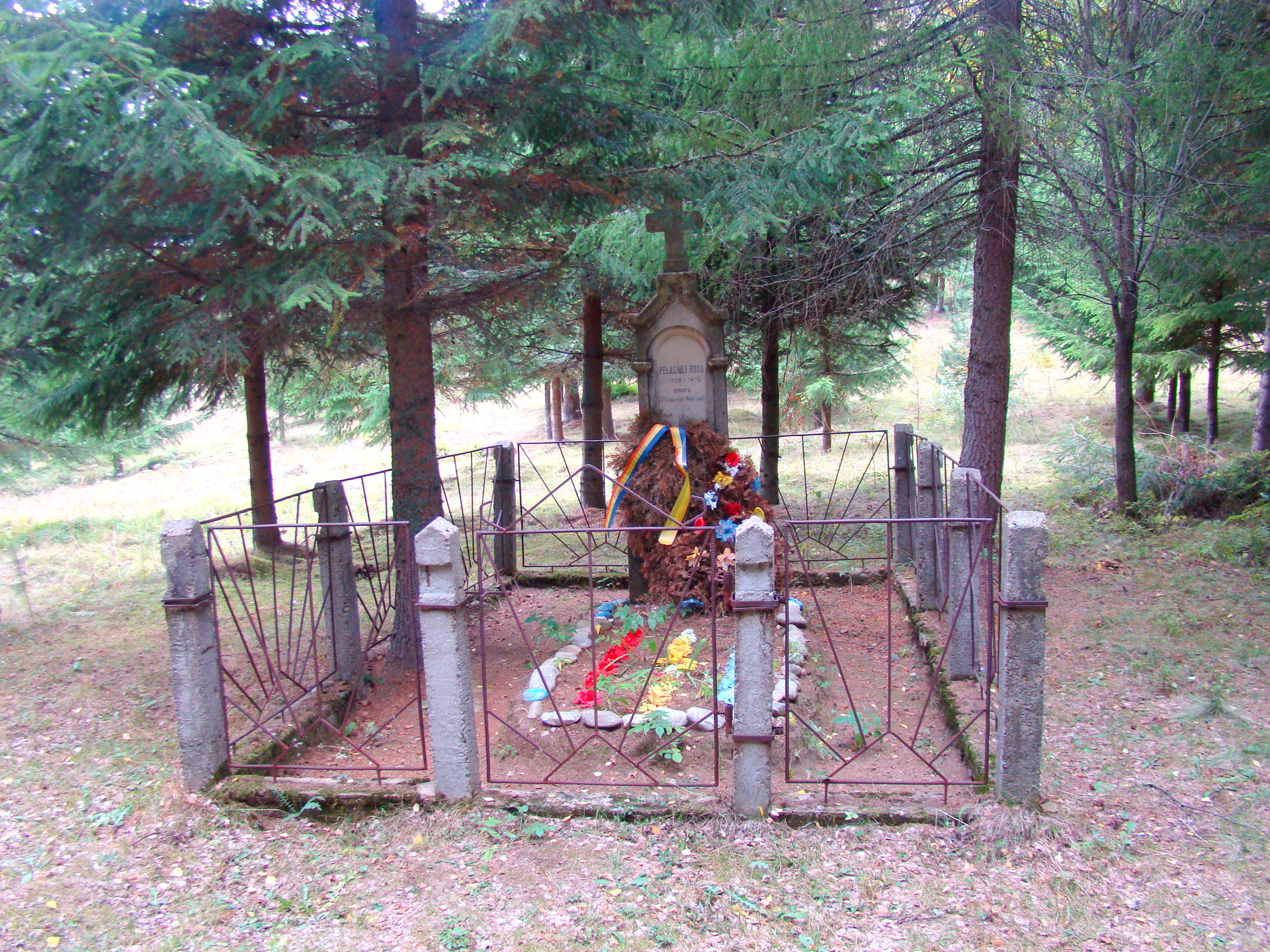
Roșu's grave in Mărișel

She was born in Mărișel, a small village near Cluj-Napoca. Her father, Ioan Dufle, provided homeschooling, using Romanian textbooks, after which she went to study for 3 years in Budapest. She was married to Ioan Roșu and had one child, named Indrei (Andrei), who later fought with Avram Iancu's army during the Transylvanian Revolution.

After the defeat in the first battle of Mărișel in February 1849, the Hungarians tried again in March, this time with a force of 1,600 soldiers. The Romanians under Iancu received support from the women of Mărișel, led by Pelaghia Roșu. With their combined help, the Hungarians were routed. They lost 30 dead on the battlefield, including a captain and a sergeant major, and another 100 drowned in the Someș River, while their many wounded were loaded onto 6 carts. The Romanians had only 2–3 men wounded.
