= Agârbiciu (river) =

River in Cluj, Romania

- Location within Romania

Location
- Country: Romania
- Counties: Cluj County
- Villages: Agârbiciu

Physical characteristics
- Mouth: Someșul Cald
  - location: Someșul Cald Reservoir
  - coordinates: 46.735°N 23.329°E

Basin features
- Progression: Someșul Cald→ Someșul Mic→ Someș→ Tisza→ Danube→ Black Sea

The Agârbiciu is a left tributary of the Someșul Cald in Romania. It discharges into the Someșul Cald Reservoir near the village Someșu Cald. Its length is 13 km (8.1 mi) and its basin size is 26 km^{2} (10 sq mi).
