= Mărișelu Hydroelectric Power Station =

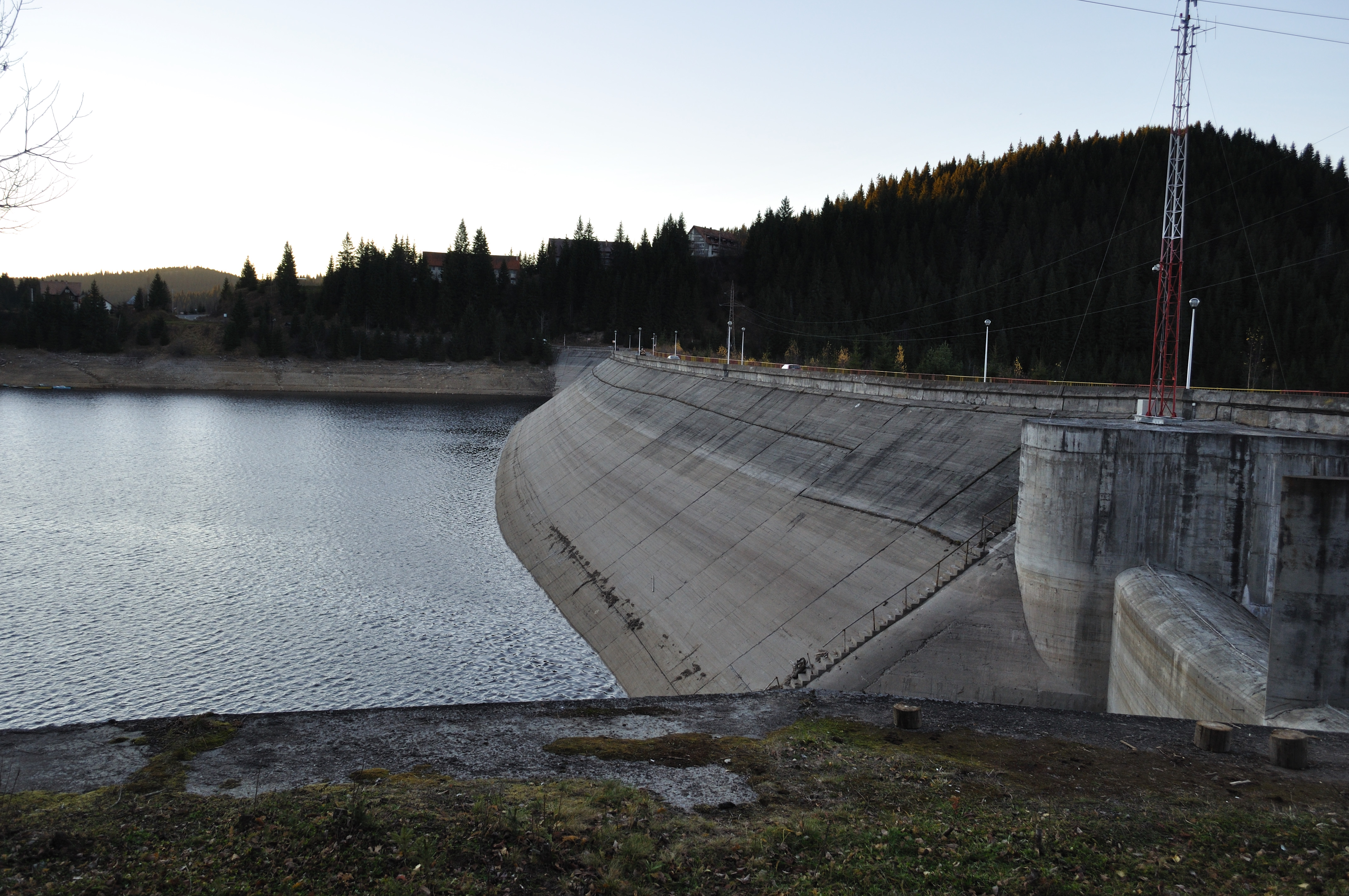
- The Fântânele dam
- Interactive map of Mărișelu Hydroelectric Power Station
- Country: Romania
- Location: Mărișel, Cluj County
- Construction began: 1970

Reservoir
- Creates: Beliș-Fântânele Lake
- Total capacity: 256 million cubic metres (208,000 acre⋅ft)
- Surface area: 2.4 km^{2} (0.93 sq mi)

Mărișelu Hydroelectric Power Station
- Coordinates: 46°43′55.8″N 23°21′2.9″E
- Installed capacity: 221 MW

Mărişelu Hydro Power Plant is a large power plant on the Someșul Cald river situated in Romania.

The project was started and finished in the 1970s and it was made up by the construction of a rockfill dam 92 metres (302 ft) high and 410 m (1,350 ft) long at the top. From the reservoir, the water is diverted through a 8.475 km (5.266 mi) tunnel to the plant. The project was equipped with three hydrounits, the hydropower plant having an installed capacity of 221 MW.

The power plant generates 560 GWh of electricity per year.

== See also ==
- Porţile de Fier I
- Porţile de Fier II
