= Lake Tarnița =

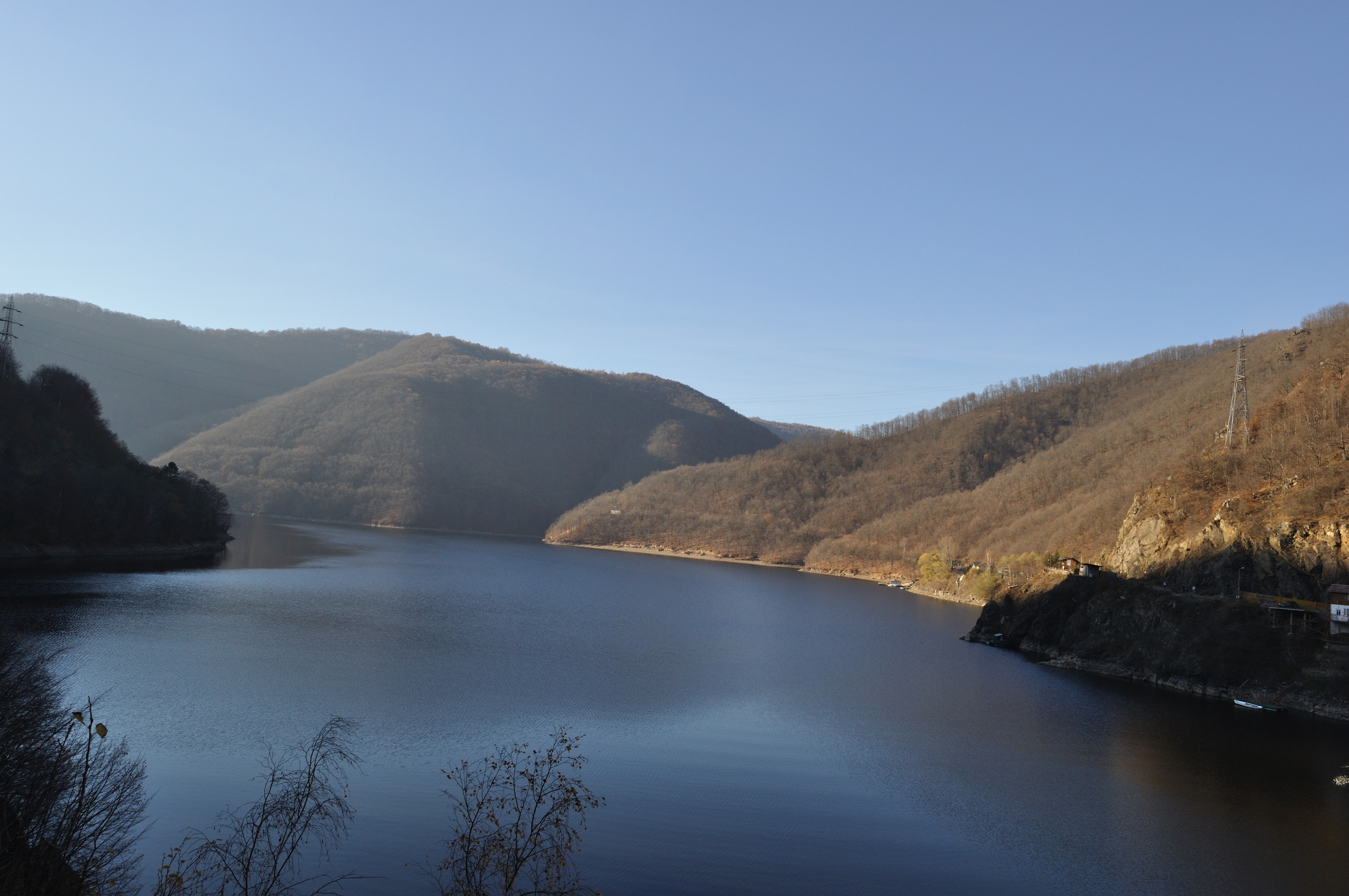

- Location within Romania
- Location: Romania
- Coordinates: 46°43′16″N 23°16′41″E
- Type: artificial lake
- Primary inflows: Someșul Cald River
- Primary outflows: Someșul Cald River
- Basin countries: Romania
- Max. length: 9 km (5.6 mi)
- Surface area: 2.15 km^{2} (0.83 sq mi)
- Max. depth: 70 m (230 ft)
- Water volume: 0.074 km^{3} (60,000 acre⋅ft)
- Surface elevation: 620 m (2,030 ft)

Lake Tarnița (Romanian: Lacul Tarnița) is a reservoir located in Cluj County, Romania, between the communes of Râșca, Mărișel, and Gilău, west of Cluj-Napoca. Covering some 215 ha (530 acres), with a length of close to 9 km (5.6 mi) and a maximum depth of over 70 m (230 ft), it is a popular tourist destination. Water from the Someșul Cald River flows into the reservoir. A 97 m (318 ft) high dam was completed in 1974.

== Notes ==
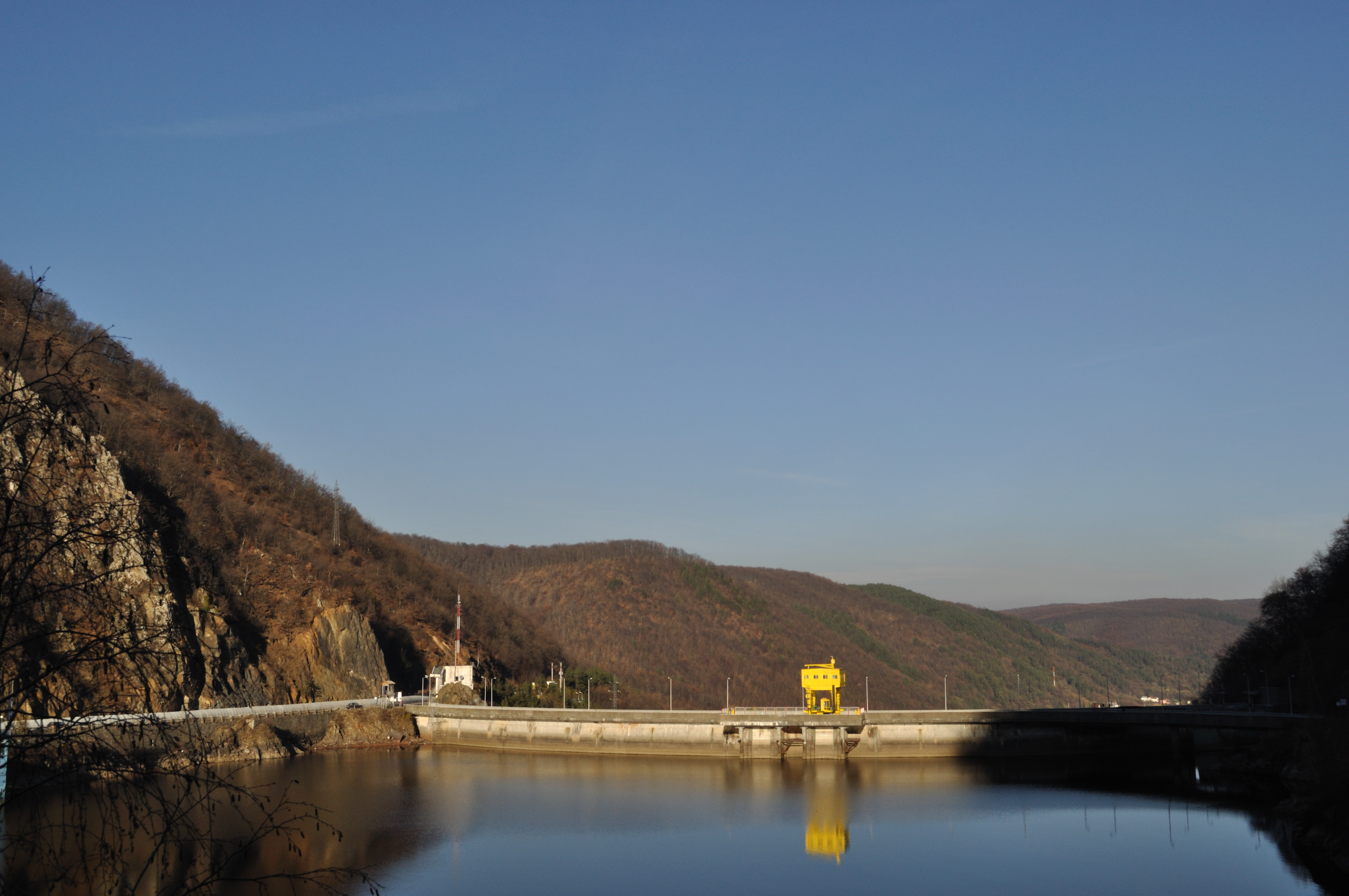
Tarnița Dam
