= Someșul Cald =

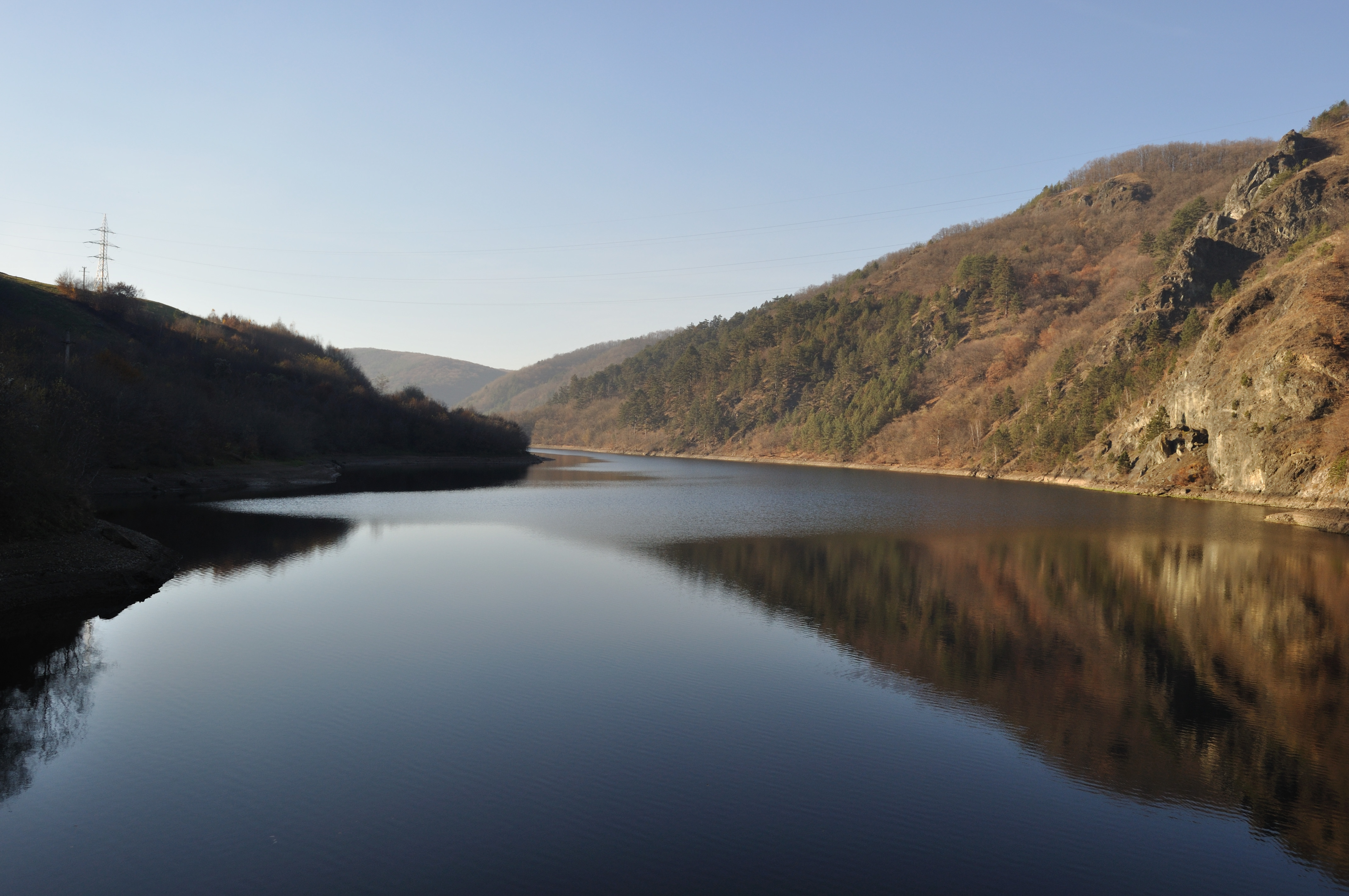

- Location within Romania

Location
- Country: Romania
- Counties: Bihor County, Cluj County
- Villages: Dealu Botii, Beliș, Râșca

Physical characteristics
- Source: Mount Piatra Grăitoare-Cârligatele
  - location: Apuseni Mountains
- Mouth: Someșul Mic
  - location: Gilău
  - coordinates: 46.739°N 23.362°E

Basin features
- Progression: Someșul Mic→ Someș→ Tisza→ Danube→ Black Sea
- Tributaries
  - left: Râșca
  - right: Beliș

The Someșul Cald (Hungarian: Meleg-Szamos; literally "Warm Someș") is the left headwater of the river Someșul Mic in Romania. It joins the Someșul Rece in Lake Gilău, a reservoir near Gilău.

The reservoirs Mărișelu, Tarnița and Someșul Cald are located on this river.

Construction of the Tarnița – Lăpuștești Hydroelectric Power Station on the river began on June 15, 2008.

== Tributaries ==
The following rivers are the main tributaries to the river Someșul Cald:

- Left: Ponor, Pârâul Firei, Râșca, Agârbiciu
- Right: Bătrâna, Giurcuța, Beliș, Leșul

Other tributaries and sub-tributaries are Alunul Mare, Alunul Mic, Valea Izbucului, Tomnatec, Valea Călineasa, Barna, Terpeș, Pârâul Porcului and Răchițele.
