= Căpușu Mare =

Căpușu Mare Magyarkapus
- Commune
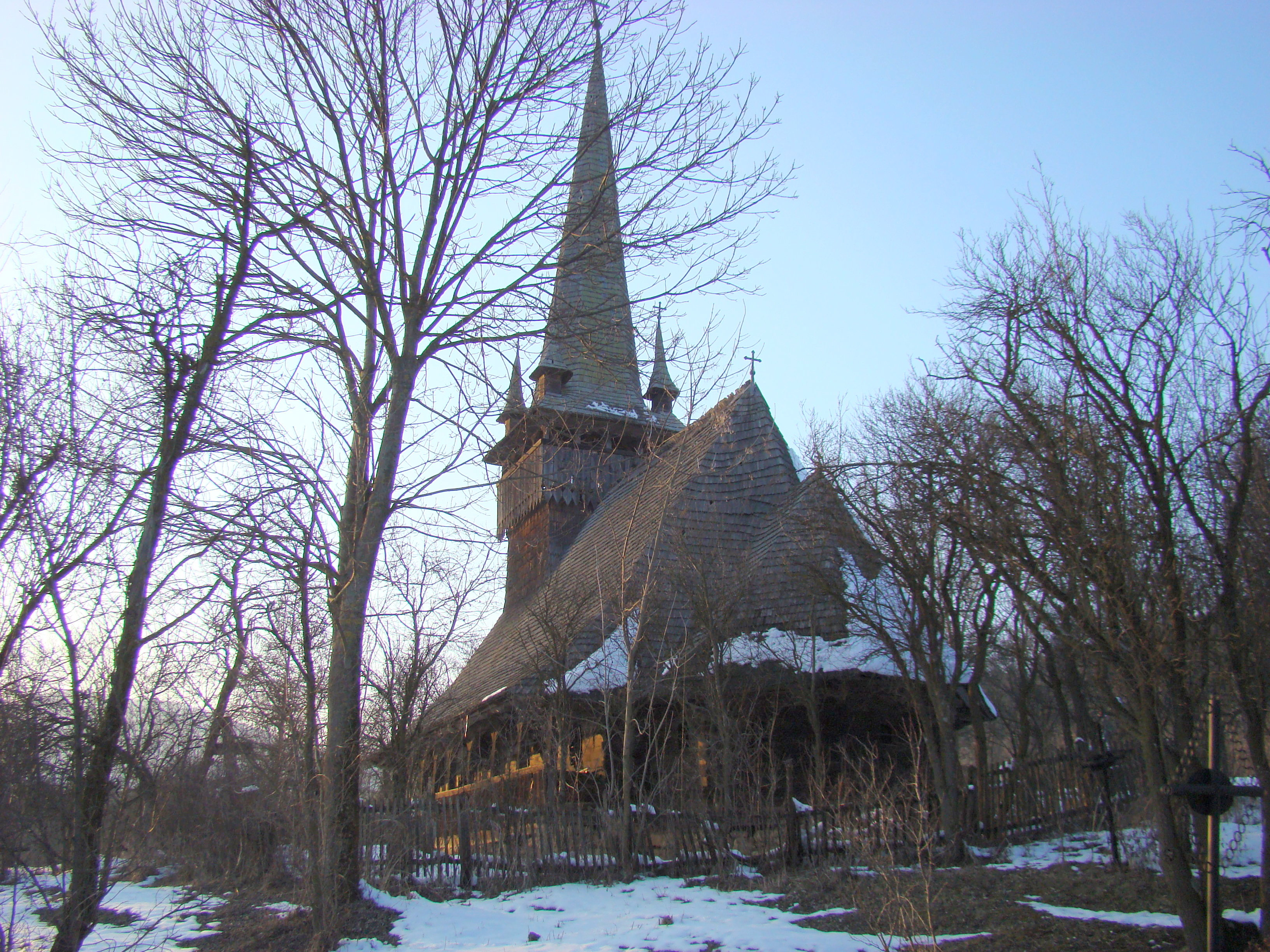
- Wooden church in Agârbiciu

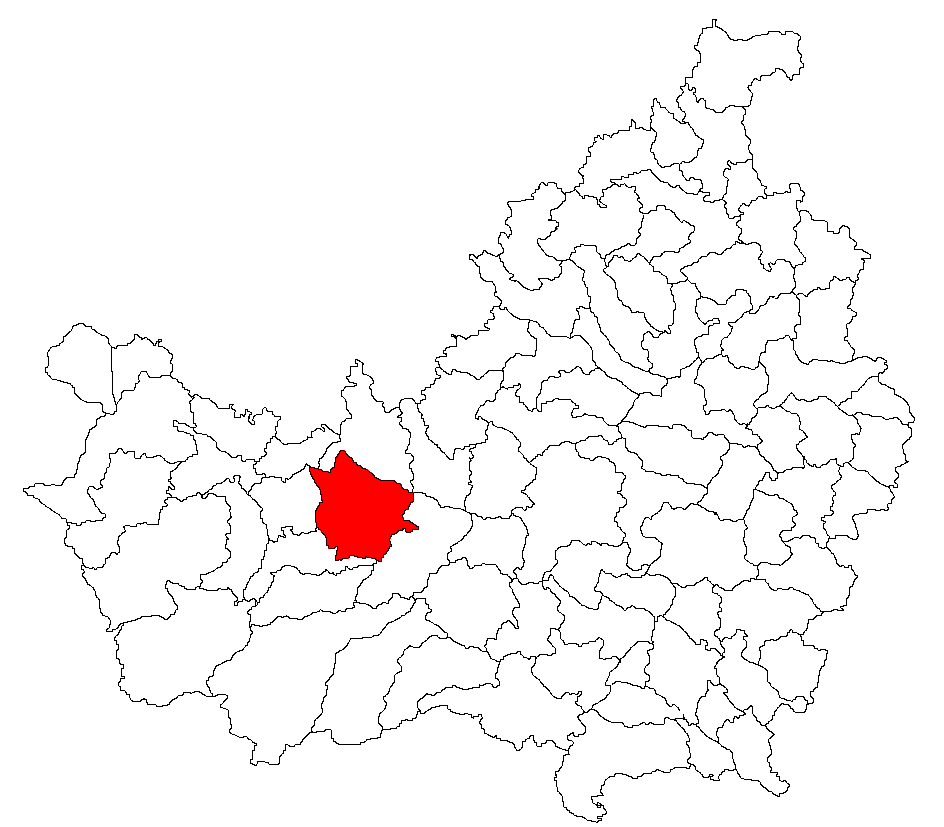
- Location in Cluj County

- Location in Romania
- Coordinates: 46°47′20″N 23°17′30″E
- Country: Romania
- County: Cluj
- Established: 1282
- Subdivisions: Agârbiciu, Bălcești, Căpușu Mare, Căpușu Mic, Dângău Mare, Dângău Mic, Dumbrava, Păniceni, Straja

Government
  - Mayor (2020–2024): Gheorghe Iancu (PNL)
- Area: 58.4 km^{2} (22.5 sq mi)
- Elevation: 469 m (1,539 ft)
- Population (2021-12-01): 3,451
  - Density: 59.1/km^{2} (153/sq mi)
- Time zone: UTC+02:00 (EET)
  - Summer (DST): UTC+03:00 (EEST)
- Postal code: 407145
- Area code: +(40) x64
- Vehicle reg.: CJ
- Website: www.primaria-capusumare.ro

Căpușu Mare (Hungarian: Magyarkapus; German: Grossthoren) is a commune in Cluj County, Transylvania, Romania, located 27 km (17 mi) west of the city of Cluj-Napoca. It is composed of nine villages: Agârbiciu (Egerbegy), Bălcești (Balkujtelep), Căpușu Mare, Căpușu Mic (Magyarkiskapus), Dângău Mare (Bánffydongó), Dângău Mic (Gyerőfidongó), Dumbrava (Gyerővásárhely), Păniceni (Gyerőfalva), and Straja (Gesztrágy).

== Geography ==
The commune is situated in the northern foothills of the Apuseni Mountains, at an altitude of 469 m (1,539 ft), on the banks of the rivers Căpuș and Agârbiciu. It is located in the central-west part of the county, 24 km (15 mi) east of Huedin and 28 km (17 mi) west of the county seat, Cluj-Napoca. Căpușu Mare is crossed by national road DN1, which links Bucharest with the northwestern part of the country and the border with Hungary.

== Economy ==
The main industry is an iron ore extraction facility. It is a tourist destination, with many new motels built in recent years.

== Demographics ==
According to the 2011 census, Romanians made up 55.2% of the population, Hungarians made up 37.3%, and Roma made up 5.6%. At the 2021 census, Căpușu Mare had a population of 3,451; of those, 59.95% were Romanians, 30.8% Hungarians, and 6.49% Roma.
