= Gilău, Cluj =

Gilău
- Commune
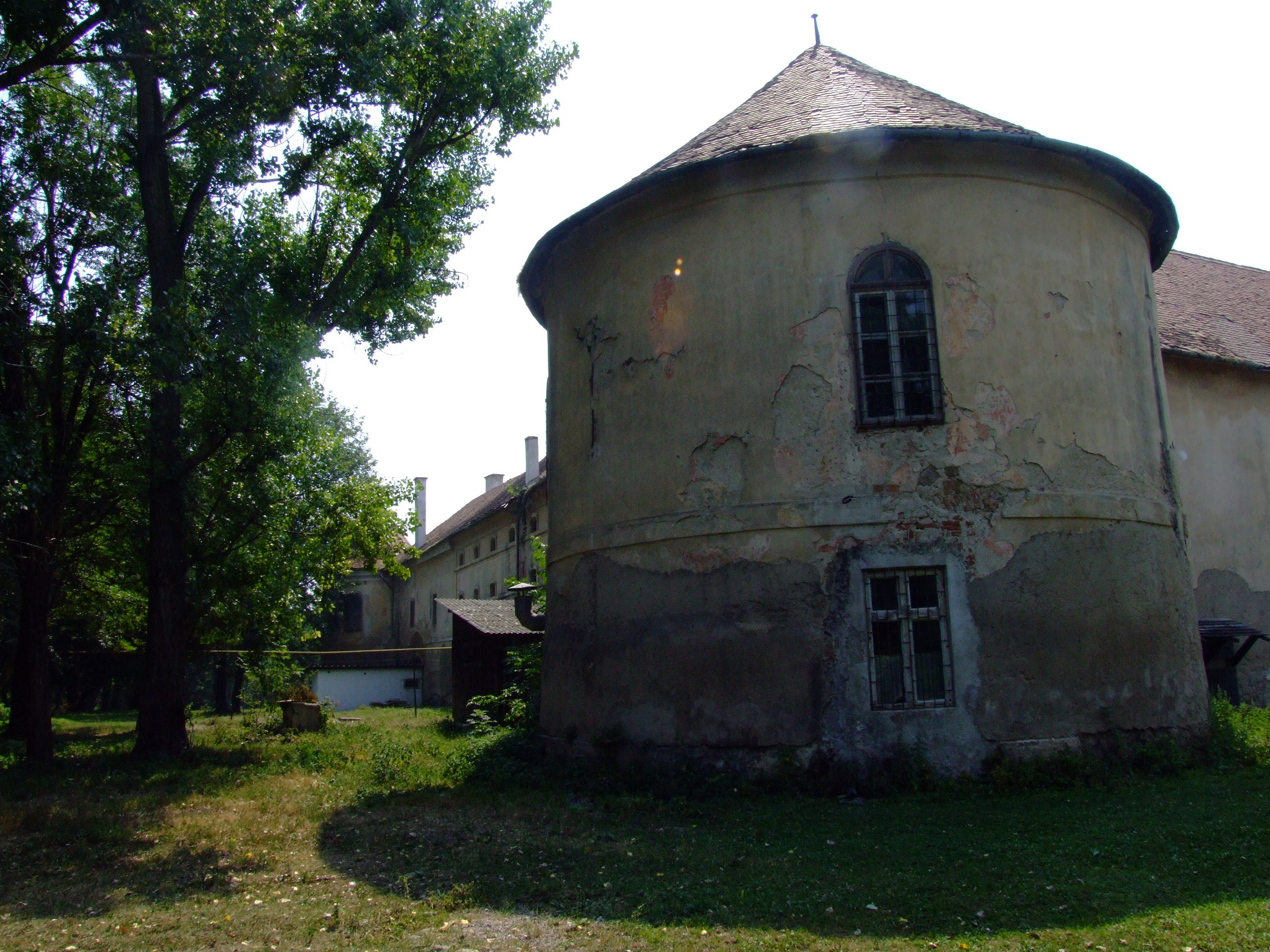
- Wass-Bánffy castle in Gilău

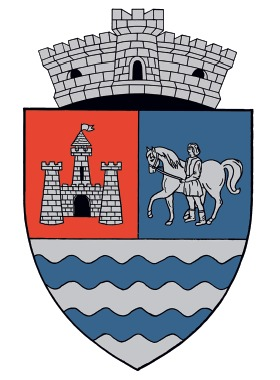
- Coat of arms

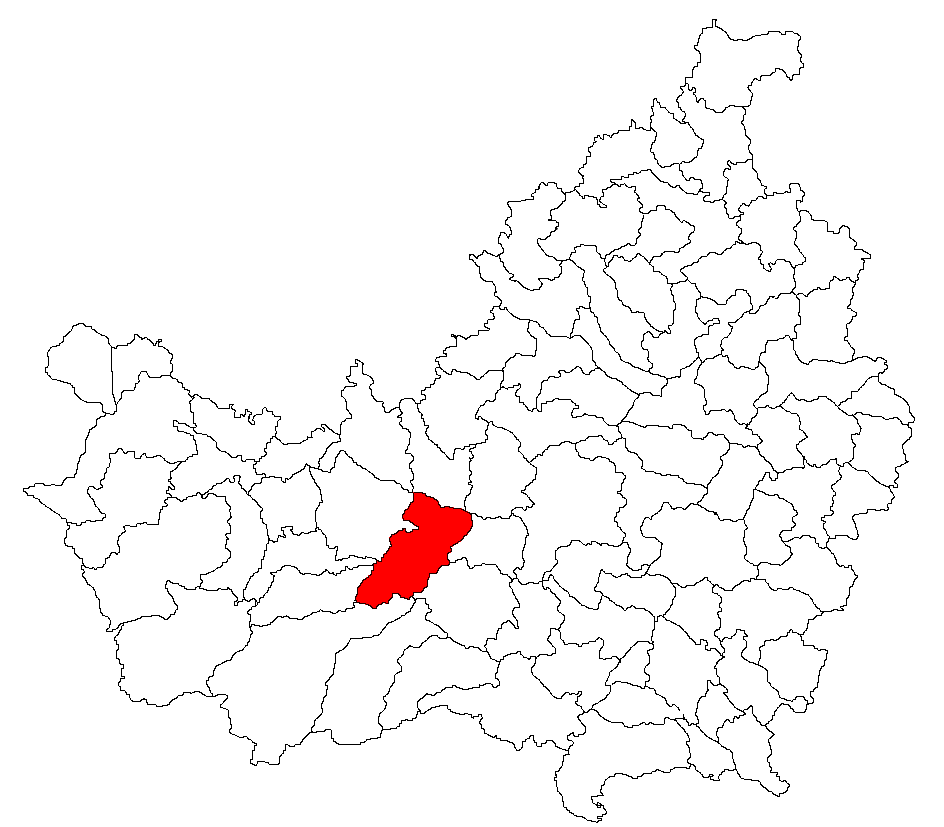
- Location in Cluj County

- Location in Romania
- Coordinates: 46°45′N 23°23′E
- Country: Romania
- County: Cluj
- Established: 1246
- Subdivisions: Gilău, Someșu Cald, Someșu Rece

Government
  - Mayor (2020–2024): Gelu-Vasile Topan (PNL)
- Area: 116.82 km^{2} (45.10 sq mi)
- Elevation: 420 m (1,380 ft)
- Population (2021-12-01): 8,980
  - Density: 76.9/km^{2} (199/sq mi)
- Time zone: UTC+02:00 (EET)
  - Summer (DST): UTC+03:00 (EEST)
- Postal code: 407310
- Area code: +40 x64
- Vehicle reg.: CJ
- Website: comunagilau.ro

Gilău (Hungarian: Gyalu; German: Julmarkt or Gela) is a commune in Cluj County, Transylvania, Romania. It is made up of three villages: Gilău, Someșu Cald (Melegszamos), and Someșu Rece (Hidegszamos).

== Geography ==
The commune lies in the northeastern foothills of the Apuseni Mountains. It is located in the central part of Cluj County, about 15 km (9.3 mi) west of the county seat, Cluj-Napoca.

Gilău borders the communes of Baciu and Gârbău to the north, Florești to the east, Săvădisla to the southeast, Măguri-Răcătău and Mărișel to the south and southwest, and Căpușu Mare to the west.

== Demographics ==
According to the census from 2002, the commune had a population of 7,861, of which 83.43% were ethnic Romanians, 9.45% ethnic Hungarians, and 7.08% ethnic Romani. At the 2021 census, Gilău had a population of 8,980; of those, 73.63% were Romanians, 9.13% Roma, and 6.43% Hungarians.

== Natives ==
- Frederic Littman (1907–1979), sculptor
