= Beliș =

- Commune
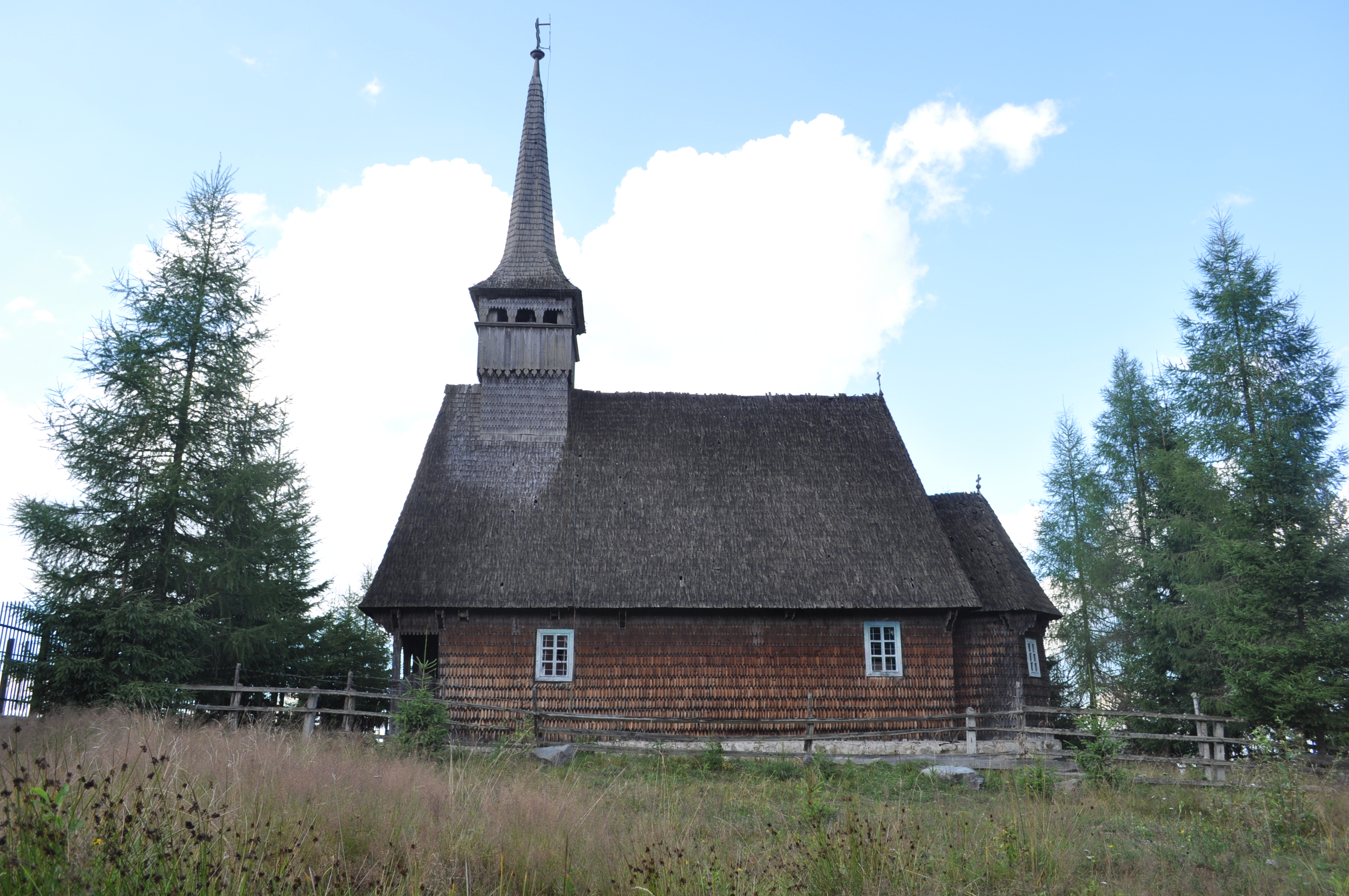
- Wooden church in Beliș

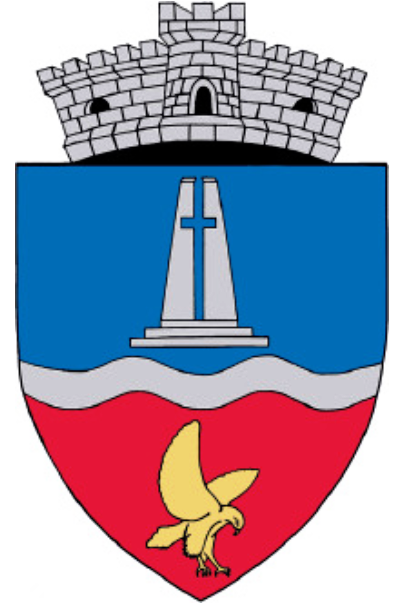
- Coat of arms

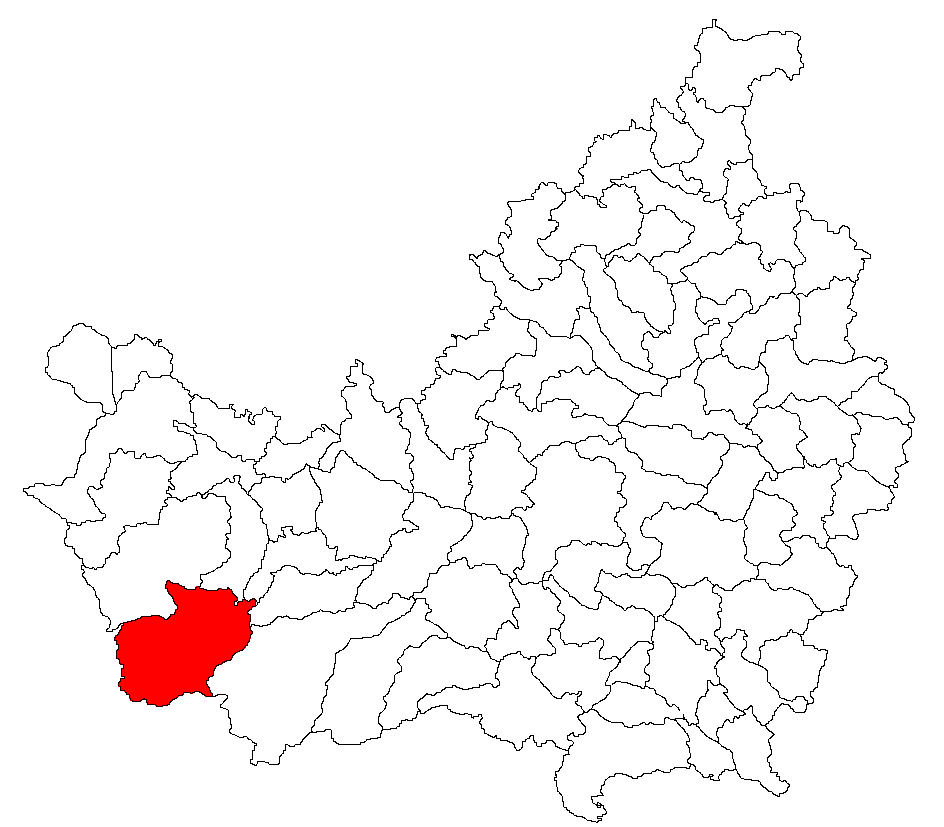
- Location in Cluj County

- Location in Romania
- Coordinates: 46°41′4″N 23°1′45″E
- Country: Romania
- County: Cluj
- Established: 1770
- Subdivisions: Bălcești, Beliș, Dealu Botii, Giurcuța de Jos, Giurcuța de Sus, Poiana Horea, Smida

Government
  - Mayor (2020–2024): Viorel Matiș (PSD)
- Area: 206.49 km^{2} (79.73 sq mi)
- Elevation: 1,162 m (3,812 ft)
- Population (2021-12-01): 1,008
  - Density: 4.882/km^{2} (12.64/sq mi)
- Time zone: UTC+02:00 (EET)
  - Summer (DST): UTC+03:00 (EEST)
- Postal code: 407075
- Area code: +(40) x64
- Vehicle reg.: CJ
- Website: primariabelis.ro

Beliș (Hungarian: Jósikafalva; German: Seedorf) is a commune in Cluj County, Transylvania, Romania. It is composed of seven villages: Bălcești (Balktelep), Beliș, Dealu Botii (Kerekhegy), Giurcuța de Jos (Alsógyurkuca), Giurcuța de Sus (Felsőgyurkuca), Poiana Horea (Dealul Calului until 1941 and in 1954–1956; Gyálukaluluj), and Smida.

== Demographics ==
According to the census from 2011, there was a total population of 1,164 people living in the commune; of those, 99.14% were ethnic Romanians and 0.34% ethnic Hungarians. At the 2021 census, Beliș had a population of 1,008, of which 84.82% were Romanians.

== Tourism ==
- Horea's tree from Scorușet forest
- Beliș Lake and Beliș-Fântânele tourist facility
- Wooden church (1764) of Dealu Negru
