= Râșca, Cluj =

Râșca
- Commune
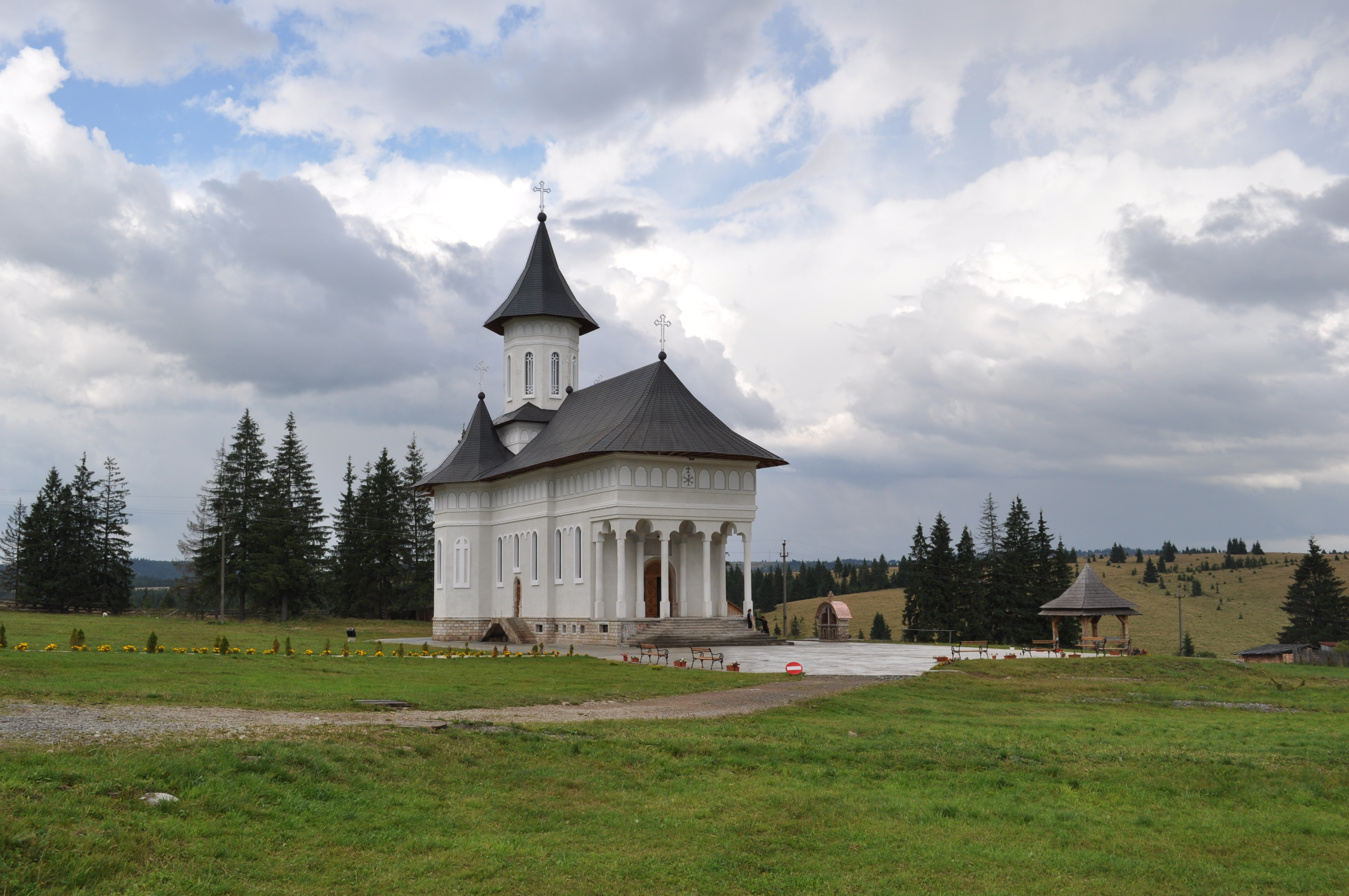
- Râșca Transilvană Monastery

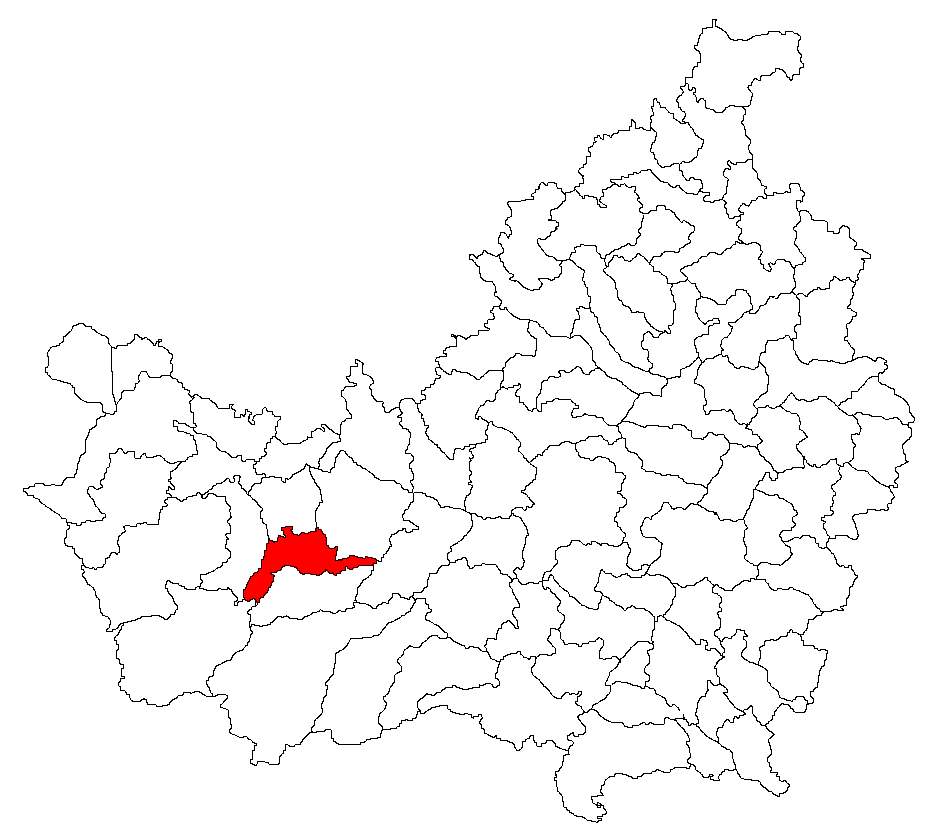
- Location in Cluj County

- Location in Romania
- Coordinates: 46°44′37.32″N 23°6′28.08″E
- Country: Romania
- County: Cluj
- Subdivisions: Dealu Mare, Lăpuștești, Mărcești, Râșca, Stațiunea Fântânele

Government
  - Mayor (2020–2024): Alin Florin Abrudan (PSD)
- Area: 65.65 km^{2} (25.35 sq mi)
- Elevation: 930 m (3,050 ft)
- Population (2021-12-01): 1,180
  - Density: 18.0/km^{2} (46.6/sq mi)
- Time zone: UTC+02:00 (EET)
  - Summer (DST): UTC+03:00 (EEST)
- Postal code: 407490
- Area code: (+40) 0264
- Vehicle reg.: CJ
- Website: www.primariarisca.ro

Râșca (Hungarian: Roska) is a commune in Cluj County, Transylvania, Romania. It is composed of five villages: Dealu Mare, Lăpuștești (Felsőszamos), Mărcești, Râșca, and Stațiunea Fântânele.

Historical population
| Year | Pop. | ±% |
|---|---|---|
| 1850 | 155 | — |
| 1880 | 238 | +53.5% |
| 1900 | 327 | +37.4% |
| 1910 | 345 | +5.5% |
| 1920 | 351 | +1.7% |
| 1930 | 1,813 | +416.5% |
| 1941 | 2,491 | +37.4% |
| 1956 | 2,551 | +2.4% |
| 1966 | 2,572 | +0.8% |
| 1977 | 2,664 | +3.6% |
| 1992 | 2,109 | −20.8% |
| 2002 | 1,814 | −14.0% |
| 2011 | 1,446 | −20.3% |
| 2021 | 1,180 | −18.4% |
Source: Census data

At the 2021 census, the commune had a population of 1,180, of which 92.71% were Romanians.
