= Scărișoara =

Scărișoara may refer to several entities in Romania:

- Scărișoara, Alba, a commune in Alba County
- Scărișoara, Olt, a commune in Olt County
- Scărișoara, a village in Corbasca Commune, Bacău County
- Scărișoara, a village in Cislău Commune, Buzău County
- Scărișoara, a village in Cornereva Commune, Caraș-Severin County
- Scărișoara, a village in Mihăești Commune, Vâlcea County
- Scărișoara Cave, an ice cave in the Apuseni Mountains
