= Lăzești =

Lăzești may refer to the following places in Romania:

- Lăzești, a village in Scărișoara Commune, Alba County
- Lăzești, a village in Vadu Moților Commune, Alba County
- Lăzești (river), a tributary of the Neagra in Alba County
