= Lăzești (river) =

- Location within Romania

Location
- Country: Romania
- Counties: Alba County
- Villages: Bârlești, Totești

Physical characteristics
- Source: Mount Negri
  - location: Bihor Mountains
  - coordinates: 46°25′37″N 22°50′50″E
  - elevation: 1,162 m (3,812 ft)
- Mouth: Neagra
  - coordinates: 46°24′14″N 22°56′22″E
  - elevation: 630 m (2,070 ft)
- Length: 9 km (5.6 mi)
- Basin size: 19 km^{2} (7.3 sq mi)

Basin features
- Progression: Neagra→ Arieșul Mare→ Arieș→ Mureș→ Tisza→ Danube→ Black Sea

The Lăzești is a left tributary of the river Neagra in Romania. It discharges into the Neagra near Popeștii de Jos. Its length is 9 km (5.6 mi) and its basin size is 19 km^{2} (7.3 sq mi).
