= Cobles =

Cobles may mean:

- Coble(s), traditional wooden Yorkshire fishing boats
- Cobleș, a river in Alba County, Romania
- Cobleș, a village in the commune Arieșeni, Alba County, Romania
