= Ordâncușa =

Ordâncușa Ordencușa
- Location within Romania

Location
- Country: Romania
- Counties: Alba County

Physical characteristics
- Source: Mount Cluj
  - location: Bihor Mountains
  - coordinates: 46°31′45″N 22°50′18″E
  - elevation: 1,314 m (4,311 ft)
- Mouth: Gârda Seacă
  - location: Gârda de Sus
  - coordinates: 46°27′40″N 22°49′33″E
  - elevation: 741 m (2,431 ft)
- Length: 10 km (6.2 mi)
- Basin size: 22 km^{2} (8.5 sq mi)

Basin features
- Progression: Gârda Seacă→ Arieșul Mare→ Arieș→ Mureș→ Tisza→ Danube→ Black Sea

The Ordâncușa (also: Ordencușa) is a left tributary of the river Gârda Seacă in Romania. It discharges into the Gârda Seacă near Gârda de Sus. Its length is 10 km (6.2 mi) and its basin size is 22 km^{2} (8.5 sq mi).
