= Avrămești (disambiguation) =

Avrămeşti may refer to several villages in Romania:

- Avrămeşti, a commune in Harghita County
- Avrămeşti, a village in Arieșeni Commune, Alba County
- Avrămeşti, a village in Avram Iancu Commune, Alba County
- Avrămeşti, a village in Luduş town, Mureș County
- Avrămeşti, a village in Voineşti Commune, Vaslui County
- Avrămeşti, a village in Scundu Commune, Vâlcea County
