= Dealu Frumos =

Dealu Frumos ("pretty hill") may refer to several villages in Romania:

- Dealu Frumos, a village in Gârda de Sus Commune, Alba County
- Dealu Frumos, a village in Vadu Moţilor Commune, Alba County
- Dealu Frumos, a village in Stâlpeni Commune, Argeș County
- Dealu Frumos, a village in Pietroșița Commune, Dâmboviţa County
- Dealu Frumos, a village in Merghindeal Commune, Sibiu County
