= Arieșul Mic =

- Location within Romania

Location
- Country: Romania
- Counties: Alba County
- Villages: Avram Iancu, Vidra

Physical characteristics
- Source: Mount Curcubăta Mare
  - location: Bihor Mountains
  - coordinates: 46°25′48″N 22°41′37″E
  - elevation: 1,494 m (4,902 ft)
- Mouth: Arieș
  - location: Lake Mihoești near Câmpeni
  - coordinates: 46°22′20″N 23°01′01″E
  - elevation: 570 m (1,870 ft)
- Length: 34 km (21 mi)
- Basin size: 160 km^{2} (62 sq mi)

Basin features
- Progression: Arieș→ Mureș→ Tisza→ Danube→ Black Sea

The Arieșul Mic (Hungarian: Kis-Aranyos) is a river in the Apuseni Mountains, Alba County, western Romania. It is the right headwater of the river Arieș. It flows through the villages Avram Iancu and Vidra, and joins the Arieșul Mare (the other headwater) in Mihoești near Câmpeni. Its length is 34 km (21 mi) and its basin size is 160 km^{2} (62 sq mi).

== Tributaries ==
The following rivers are tributaries to the river Arieșul Mic (from source to mouth):

- Left: Micoaia, Libărțana, Valea Boului, Drăghița, Slatina and Valea Lungă
- Right: Divaia, Cioha, Păltiniș, Dobrani, Vidrișoara and Valea Dolii
