= Avramescu =

Avramescu is a Romanian surname. Notable people with the surname include:

- Gheorghe Avramescu (1888–1945), Romanian Lieutenant-General during World War II

== See also ==
- Avrămeşti (disambiguation)
