= Mătișești =

Mătişeşti may refer to several places in Romania:

- Mătişeşti, a village in Ciuruleasa Commune, Alba County
- Mătişeşti, a village in Horea Commune, Alba County
- Mătișești River, a tributary of the Ploștini River in Romania
