= Ghizghiț =

- Location within Romania

Location
- Country: Romania
- Counties: Alba County
- Villages: Biharia, Sucești, Gârda de Sus

Physical characteristics
- Mouth: Arieșul Mare
  - location: Gârda de Sus
  - coordinates: 46.4520°N 22.8205°E
- Length: 9 km (5.6 mi)
- Basin size: 18 km^{2} (6.9 sq mi)

Basin features
- Progression: Arieșul Mare→ Arieș→ Mureș→ Tisza→ Danube→ Black Sea

The Ghizghiț is a right tributary of the river Arieșul Mare in Romania. It flows into the Arieșul Mare in Gârda de Sus. Its length is 9 km (5.6 mi) and its basin size is 18 km^{2} (6.9 sq mi).
