= Albac (Arieș) =

- Location within Romania

Location
- Country: Romania
- Counties: Alba County
- Villages: Horea, Albac

Physical characteristics
- Source: Mount Cluj
  - location: Bihor Mountains
  - coordinates: 46°32′27″N 22°51′19″E
  - elevation: 1,281 m (4,203 ft)
- Mouth: Arieșul Mare
  - location: Albac
  - coordinates: 46°26′51″N 22°57′44″E
  - elevation: 628 m (2,060 ft)
- Length: 19 km (12 mi)
- Basin size: 95 km^{2} (37 sq mi)

Basin features
- Progression: Arieșul Mare→ Arieș→ Mureș→ Tisza→ Danube→ Black Sea
- Tributaries
  - left: Ploștini, Arada, Lămășoaia

The Albac is a left tributary of the river Arieșul Mare in Romania. It discharges into the Arieșul Mare in the village Albac. Its length is 19 km (12 mi) and its basin size is 95 km^{2} (37 sq mi).
