= Bucegi Natural Park =

- Parcul Natural Bucegi
- IUCN category V (protected landscape/seascape)
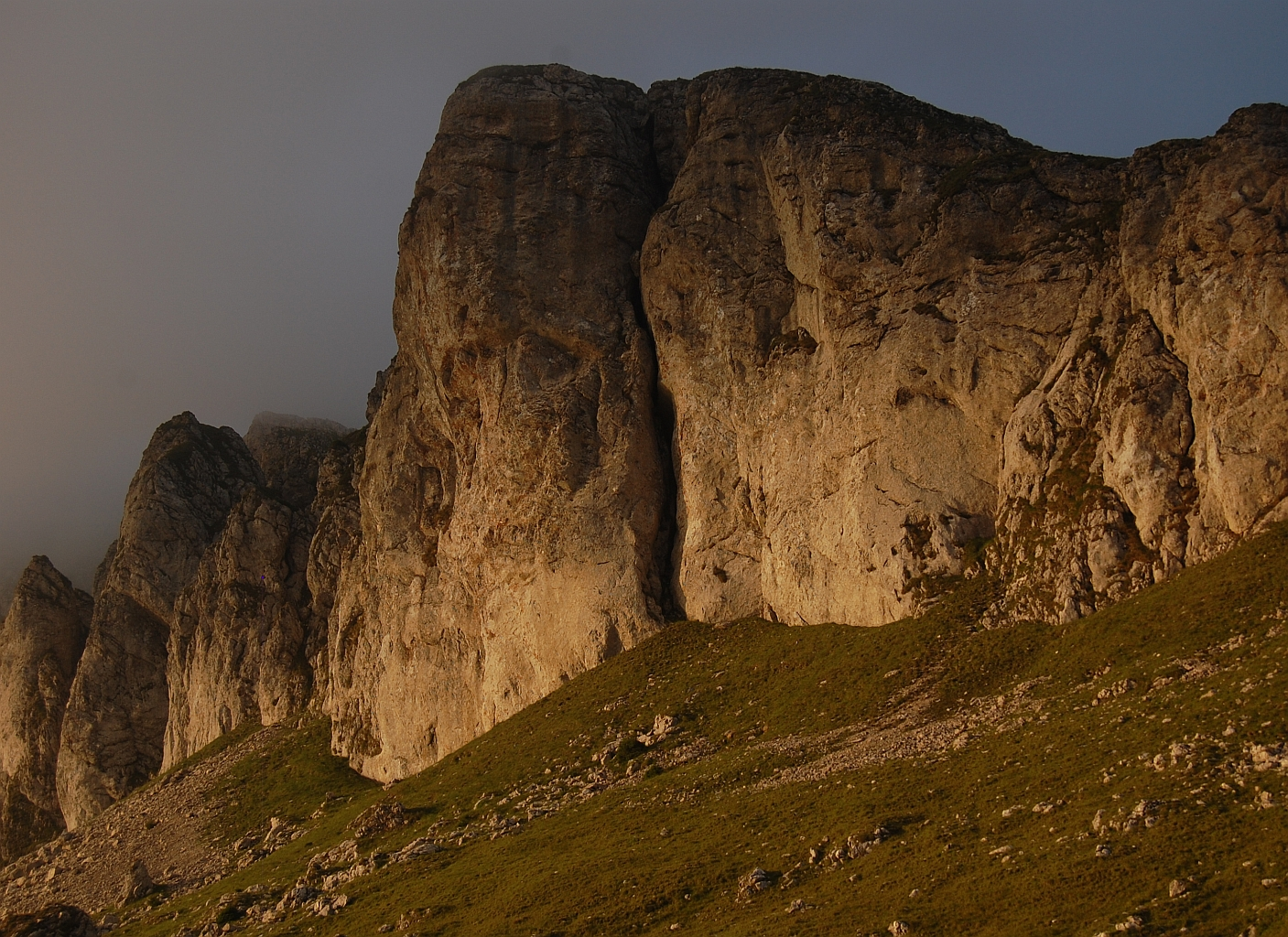
- The Bucegi Mountains (scenery)

- Location within Romania
- Location: Romania; In the administrative territory of counties: Brașov; Dâmbovița; Prahova
- Nearest city: Sinaia
- Coordinates: 45.377°N 25.445°E
- Area: 32.663 hectares (80.71 acres)
- Established: 1974, declared in 2000
- Website: www.bucegipark.ro

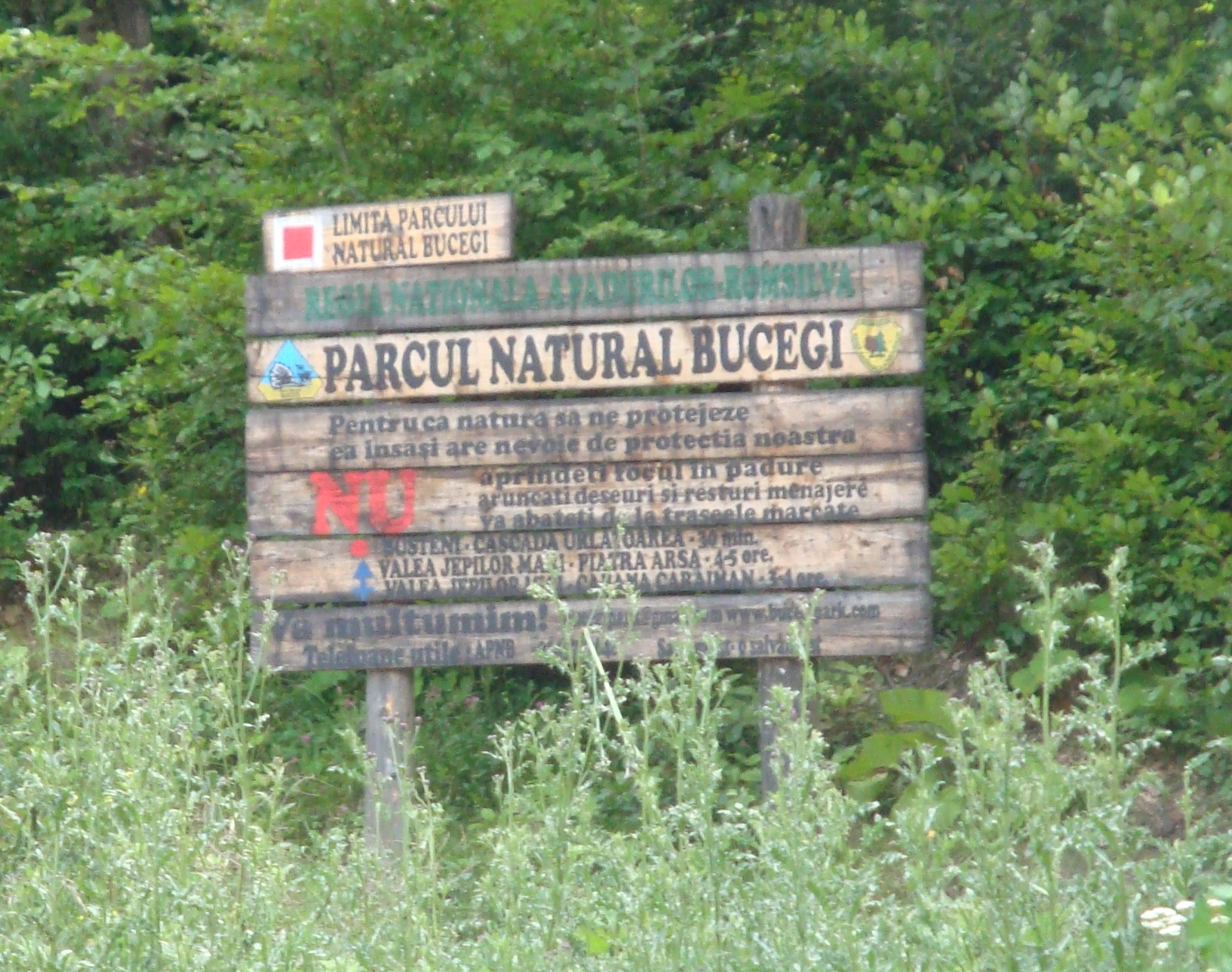

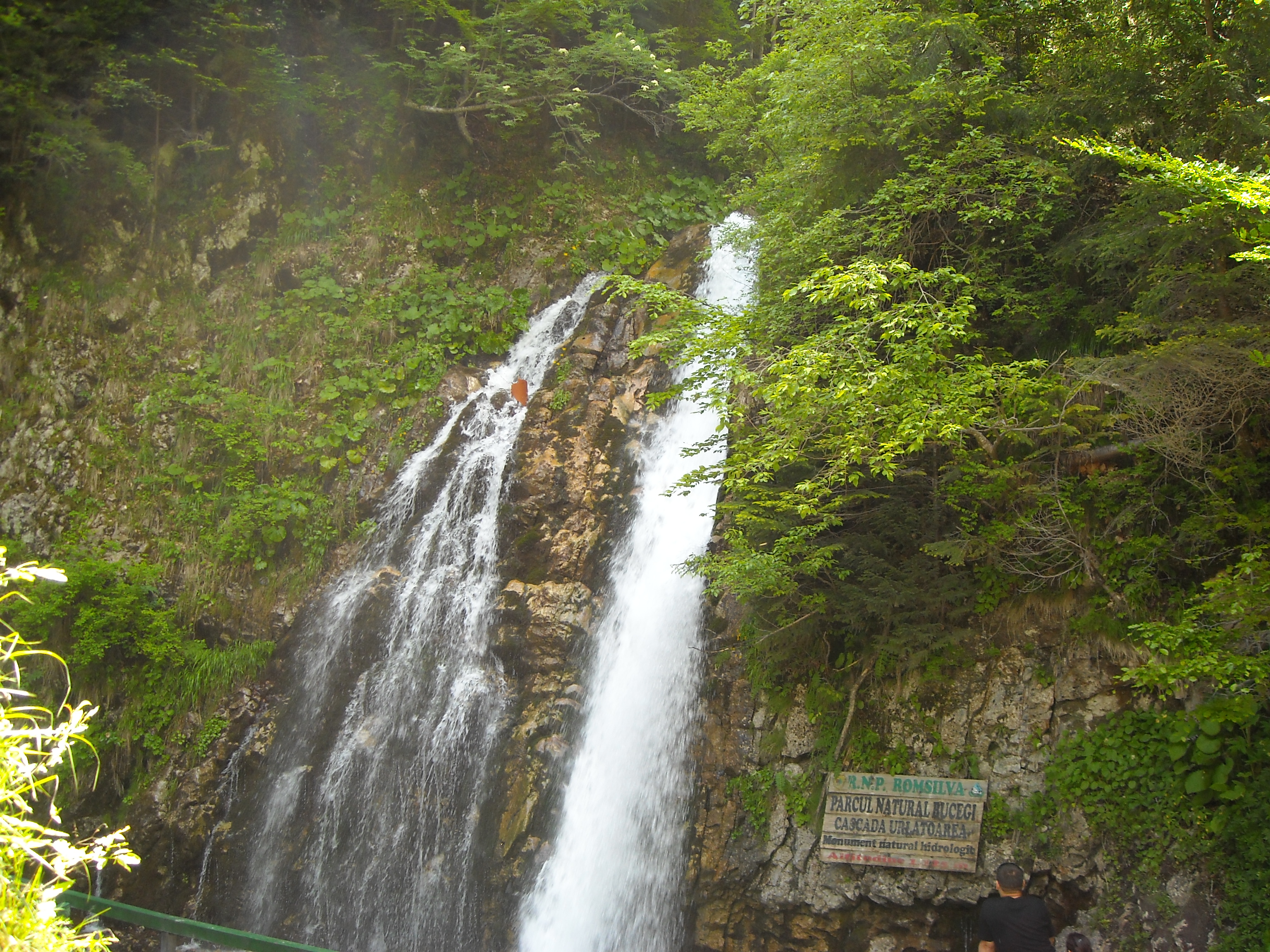
Urlătoarea Waterfall

The Bucegi Natural Park (Romanian: Parcul Natural Bucegi) is a protected area (natural park category V IUCN) situated in Romania, in the administrative territory of counties Brașov, Dâmbovița and Prahova.

== Location ==
The Natural Park is located in the south-central part of Romania, in the Bucegi Mountains of the Southern Carpathians.

== Description ==
The Bucegi Natural Park with an area of 32.663 ha was declared a protected area by Law Number 5 of March 6, 2000 (published in Monitorul Oficial Number 152 of April 12, 2000) and represents a mountainous area (caves, pit caves, canyons, ridges, sinkholes, valleys, waterfalls, pastures and forests), that shelters a variety of flora and fauna. The park is famous for its Babele and Sphinx features.

=== Habitats ===
Beech forests, bushes, alpine limestone grasslands, alpine rivers and herbaceous vegetation, mountain hay meadows, springs, limestone rocky slopes and seminatural dry grasslands.

=== Natural reserves ===
Protected areas included in the park: Abruptul Mălăiești - Bucșoiu - Gaura (1.634 ha) and Locul fosilifer Vama Strunga in Brașov County; Cocora Cave and Cheile Urșilor (307 ha) in Dâmbovița County; and Abruptul Prahovean Bucegi (3.478 ha) and Colții lui Barbeș Mountains (1.513 ha) in Prahova County.
