= Haiducești =

Haiducești may refer to:

- A village in commune Vidra, Alba
- A type of doina (Romanian ballad)
