= Botesbánya =

Botesbánya is the Hungarian name for three villages in Romania:

- Boteşti village, Câmpeni Town, Alba County
- Boteşti village, Zlatna Town, Alba County
- Boteşti village, Scărișoara Commune, Alba County
