= Marvila =

Marvila may refer to:

- Marvila, Lisbon, a parish of the city of Lisbon, Portugal
- Marvila, a village in the municipality of Corbasca, Romania
