= Padina Plateau =

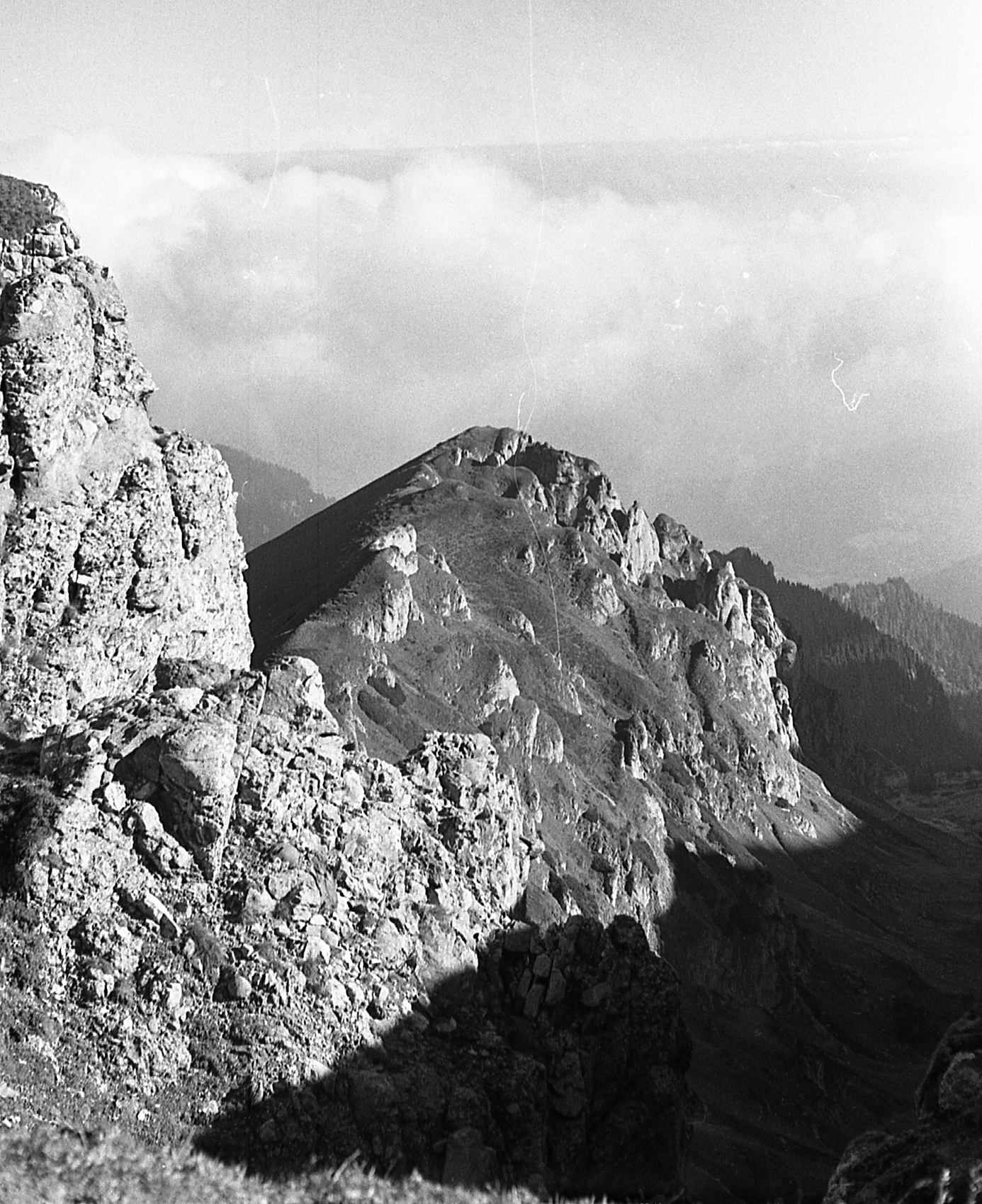
A Padina Crucii gerinc, jobbra a Malaiesti-völgy

The Padina Plateau is high-altitude region in the Bucegi Mountains situated at 1500m above sea level. Among the plateau's attractions is the Bolboci Lake. Also on the plateau is the Padina National Mountain Rescue Centre. Nearby is the Babele area of rock formation and the Omu Peak (2505m), the 11th highest point in Romania. The Padina Plateau and Chalet is a camping location in the Bucegi mountains of Romania. It is located next to the Tatarului Gorges, which were carved out by the Lalomita river.
