= Blejani =

Blejani may refer to several villages in Romania:

- Blejani, a village in the commune of Vedea, Argeș
- Blejani, a village in Scundu Commune, Vâlcea County
