= Gârda Seacă =

- Location within Romania

Location
- Country: Romania
- Counties: Alba County
- Villages: Gârda de Sus

Physical characteristics
- Source: Mount Fața Muntelui
  - location: Bihor Mountains
  - coordinates: 46°34′20″N 22°45′30″E
  - elevation: 1,264 m (4,147 ft)
- Mouth: Arieșul Mare
  - location: Gârda de Sus
  - coordinates: 46°27′18″N 22°49′44″E
  - elevation: 726 m (2,382 ft)
- Length: 17 km (11 mi)
- Basin size: 72 km^{2} (28 sq mi)

Basin features
- Progression: Arieșul Mare→ Arieș→ Mureș→ Tisza→ Danube→ Black Sea
- Tributaries
  - left: Ordâncușa

The Gârda Seacă is a left tributary of the river Arieșul Mare in Romania. It discharges into the Arieșul Mare in Gârda de Sus. Its length is 17 km (11 mi) and its basin size is 72 km^{2} (28 sq mi).
