= Valea Dolii =

- Location within Romania

Location
- Country: Romania
- Counties: Alba County
- Villages: Pleșcuța

Physical characteristics
- Source
  - elevation: 1,100 m (3,600 ft)
- Mouth: Arieșul Mic
  - location: Ponorel
  - coordinates: 46°22′05″N 22°57′48″E
  - elevation: 590 m (1,940 ft)
- Length: 5 km (3.1 mi)
- Basin size: 19 km^{2} (7.3 sq mi)

Basin features
- Progression: Arieșul Mic→ Arieș→ Mureș→ Tisza→ Danube→ Black Sea
- Tributaries
  - left: Pleșcuța

The Valea Dolii is a right tributary of the river Arieșul Mic in Romania. It discharges into the Arieșul Mic in Ponorel. Its length is 5 km (3.1 mi) and its basin size is 19 km^{2} (7.3 sq mi).
