= Ploștini =

- Location within Romania

Location
- Country: Romania
- Counties: Alba County

Physical characteristics
- Source: Bihor Mountains
  - coordinates: 46°32′46″N 22°57′10″E
  - elevation: 1,298 m (4,259 ft)
- Mouth: Albac
  - coordinates: 46°30′26″N 22°55′50″E
  - elevation: 752 m (2,467 ft)
- Length: 6 km (3.7 mi)
- Basin size: 21 km^{2} (8.1 sq mi)

Basin features
- Progression: Albac→ Arieșul Mare→ Arieș→ Mureș→ Tisza→ Danube→ Black Sea
- Tributaries
  - right: Mătișești

The Ploștini is a left tributary of the river Albac in Romania. It discharges into the Albac in Horea. Its length is 6 km (3.7 mi) and its basin size is 21 km^{2} (8.1 sq mi).
