= Cobleș =

- Location within Romania

Location
- Country: Romania
- Counties: Alba County
- Villages: Cobleș, Fața Cristesei

Physical characteristics
- Source: Mount Vârtop
  - location: Bihor Mountains
  - coordinates: 46°32′25″N 22°45′23″E
  - elevation: 1,194 m (3,917 ft)
- Mouth: Arieșul Mare
  - location: Arieșeni
  - coordinates: 46°28′34″N 22°45′39″E
  - elevation: 835 m (2,740 ft)
- Length: 9 km (5.6 mi)
- Basin size: 28 km^{2} (11 sq mi)

Basin features
- Progression: Arieșul Mare→ Arieș→ Mureș→ Tisza→ Danube→ Black Sea

The Cobleș is a left tributary of the river Arieșul Mare in Romania. It discharges into the Arieșul Mare in Arieșeni. Its length is 9 km (5.6 mi) and its basin size is 28 km^{2} (11 sq mi).
