= Sphinx (Romania) =

Rock formation in the Bucegi Mountains

Coordinates: 45.4083°N 25.4703°E

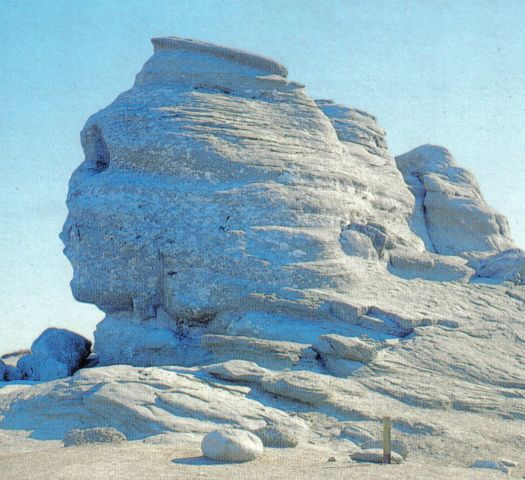

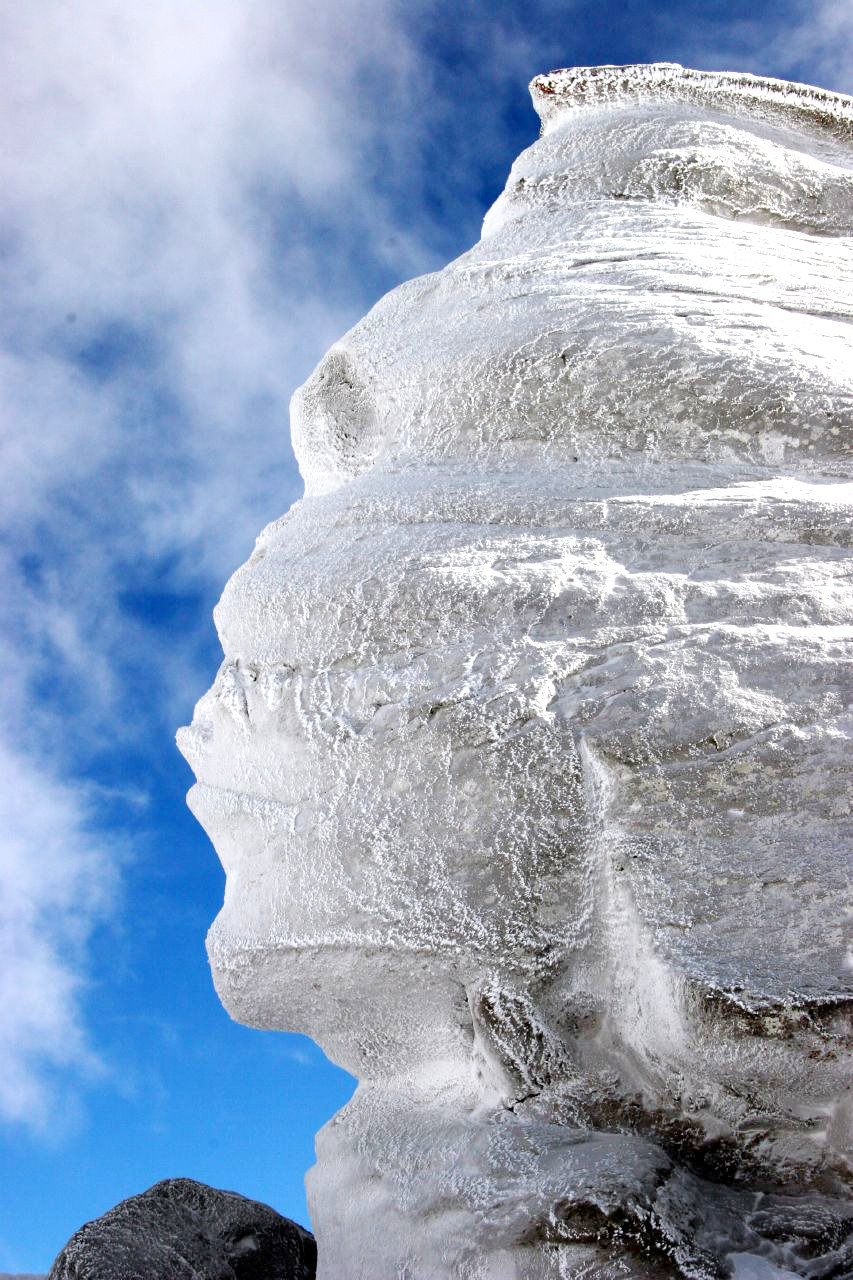
Sphinx from Bucegi

The Sphinx (Romanian: Sfinxul) is a natural rock formation in the Bucegi Natural Park which is in the Bucegi Mountains of Romania. It is located at an altitude of 2,216 metres (7,270 ft) within the Babele complex of rock formations.

The first photo of the Great Bucegi Sphinx was probably taken in about the year 1900. This photograph was taken from a front position, not from a lateral one, as it usually appears in modern pictures. It only acquired its nickname, referring to the Great Sphinx of Giza, in the year 1936. The image of the sphinx appears when the rock, having an 8 m height and a 12 m width, is observed from a certain angle. The megalith has its clearest outline on 21 November, at the time the sun goes down.

== In Romanian film ==
The Sphinx features in the 1967 film The Dacians, in which it is a place of sacrifice to the god Zalmoxis. It also plays a significant role in the 1980 film Burebista, in which it is equated with the eponymous ancient Dacian king and the eternity of Romanian identity.

== Geology and formation ==
The Bucegi Sphinx is the remnant of a once-continuous sedimentary layer of sandstone and conglomerate that once blanketed the north-central Bucegi plateau. Over hundreds of thousands of years, successive glacial and interglacial phases during the Pleistocene exposed the rock to rainfall, wind and marked freeze-thaw cycles. Water running over the gently sloping plateau exploited natural bedding planes, carving narrow grooves and hollows; when temperatures dropped below freezing, seeped water turned to ice and expanded, gradually prising apart rock fragments. Meanwhile, wind abrasion and thermal variation worked in concert to detach softer material, isolating the Sphinx's compact core from its surroundings.

The alternating bands of more resistant conglomerate and finer sandstone give the Sphinx its characteristic layered hues—ranging from pale grey and buff to deeper browns—and govern how quickly different parts of the formation erode. Its overall surface area (over 100 square metres) and height (exceeding 10 metres) are the greatest among the cluster of ten similar erosional "micro-landforms" in the area, making it both a visually striking and pedagogically useful example of differential weathering on the Bucegi plateau. These processes—sheet and rill erosion by water, wind deflation and cyclical freeze–thaw wedging—operate over long timescales to shape the plateau's bedrock. The Sphinx, as the most prominent residual feature, exemplifies how variations in sediment composition and weathering rates preserve a record of past environmental conditions and is often cited in studies of geotourism.

== See also ==
- Pareidolia
- Seven Natural Wonders of Romania
