= Neagra (Arieș) =

River in Romania

- Location within Romania

Location
- Country: Romania
- Counties: Alba County
- Villages: Poiana Vadului, Vadu Moților

Physical characteristics
- Source: Mount Târsii
  - location: Bihor Mountains
  - coordinates: 46°24′18″N 22°49′06″E
  - elevation: 1,095 m (3,593 ft)
- Mouth: Arieșul Mare
  - location: Vadu Moților
  - coordinates: 46°23′58″N 22°57′47″E
  - elevation: 591 m (1,939 ft)
- Length: 12 km (7.5 mi)
- Basin size: 52 km^{2} (20 sq mi)

Basin features
- Progression: Arieșul Mare→ Arieș→ Mureș→ Tisza→ Danube→ Black Sea
- Tributaries
  - left: Măgura, Lăzești

The Neagra is a right tributary of the river Arieșul Mare in Romania. It discharges into the Arieșul Mare in Popeștii de Jos. Its length is 12 km (7.5 mi) and its basin size is 52 km^{2} (20 sq mi).
