= Seven Natural Wonders of Romania =

The Seven Natural Wonders of Romania (Romanian: Cele Şapte Minuni Naturale ale României) are the seven natural wonders of Romania, which were chosen in the Seven Natural Wonders of Romania contest held in July, 2008. It was the second stage of the Seven Wonders of Romania program started in 2007. The voting consisted of two parts: experts in Romania voted for their seven best sites, and internet users voted for their seven favorite sites on the official website.

The internet voting on the 16 possible candidates was opened on July 1, 2008 at the program's web-site. A total of around 60,000 internet users voted in the campaign. The voting was closed on July 24, 2008 and the results were officially announced two days later on July 26. The whole campaign was initiated in 2008 by the Evenimentul Zilei newspaper in an effort to teach Romanians about the beauty of the natural surroundings of their country. The same newspaper underwent in 2007 a similar national campaign to vote for the Seven Wonders of Romania that were exclusively manmade.

An interesting fact is the final table of the campaign because the winner, the Danube Delta, received 11.34% of the total votes. The Cheile Bicazului-Hăşmaş was the natural wonder that came just outside the top seven wonders, and needed only six more votes to topple the Sphinx and Babele. Initially there were only fourteen natural wonders on the list but at public demand two more have been added: the Cetăţile Ponorului and the Olt Defile.

== Nominations ==
Three objects from the nomination list needed a special nomination:

- the Berca Mud Volcanoes, the only of their kind in Romania;
- the Iron Gates, one of the largest gorge in Romania;
- the Vânători-Neamț Natural Park.

== Winners ==
| Place | Wonder | Image |
|---|---|---|
| 1st | Danube Delta in Tulcea County | Danube Delta |
| 2nd | Retezat National Park in Hunedoara County | Retezat National Park |
| 3rd | Scărișoara Cave in Alba County | Scărișoara Cave |
| 4th | Cheile Nerei-Beușnița National Park in Caraș-Severin County | |
| 5th | Ceahlău Massif in Neamț County | Ceahlău Massif |
| 6th | Piatra Craiului Mountains in Brașov County/Argeș County | Piatra Craiului Mountains |
| 7th | Sphinx and Babele in Dâmbovița County | |

== See also ==
- Seven Wonders of the World
- Seven Wonders of Romania
