= Albac =

- Commune
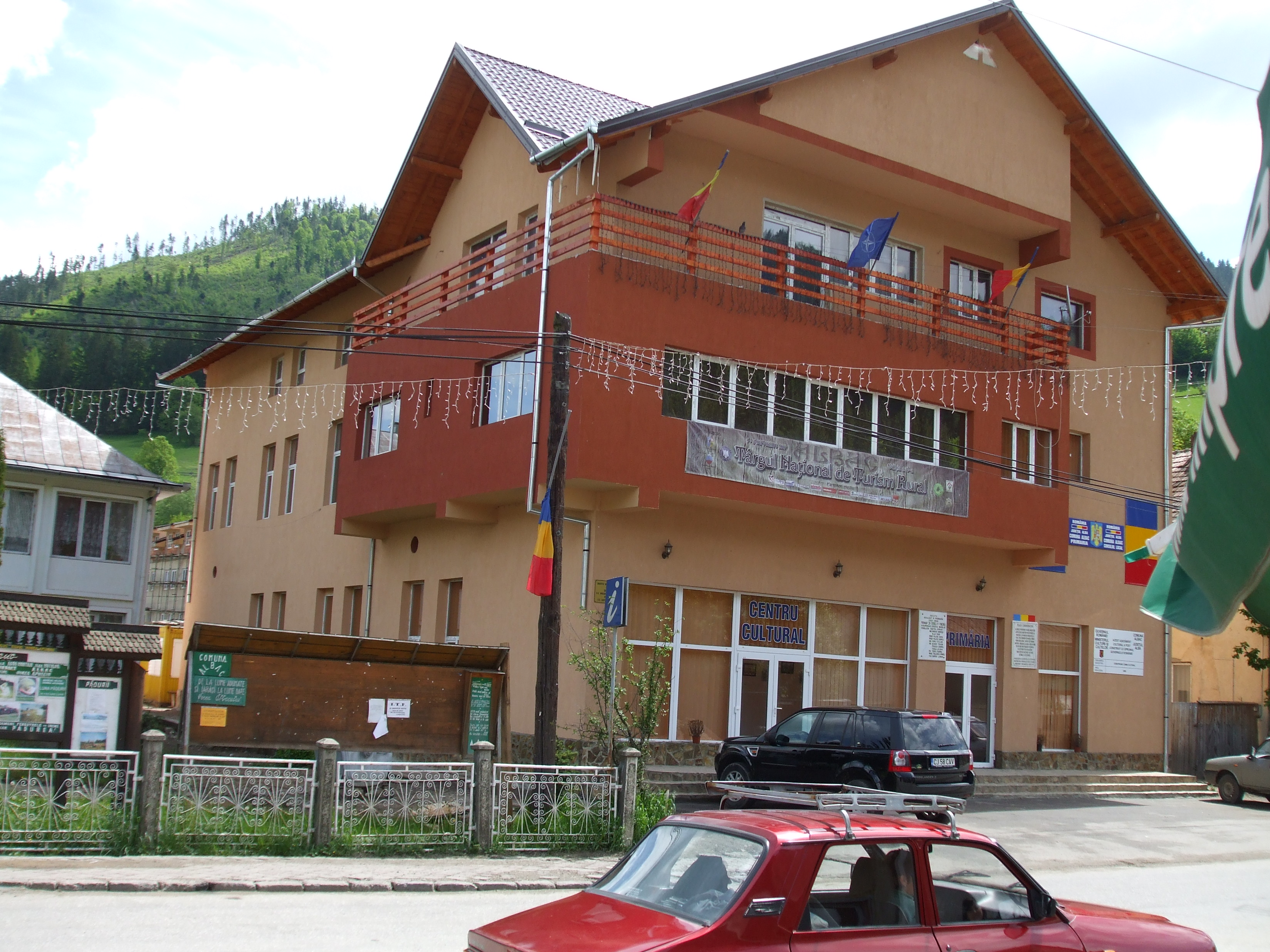
- Albac town hall

- Coat of arms

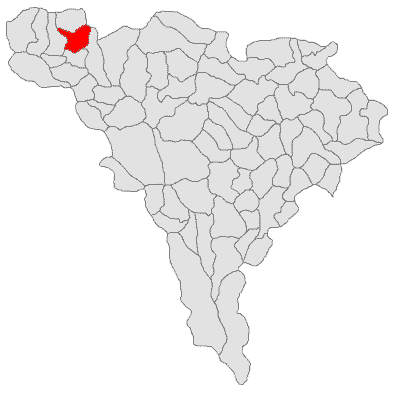
- Location in Alba County

- Location in Romania
- Coordinates: 46°27′N 22°58′E
- Country: Romania
- County: Alba

Government
  - Mayor (2020–2024): Petru Tiberiu Todea (PNL)
- Area: 53.89 km^{2} (20.81 sq mi)
- Highest elevation: 932 m (3,058 ft)
- Lowest elevation: 620 m (2,030 ft)
- Population (2021-12-01): 1,846
  - Density: 34.25/km^{2} (88.72/sq mi)
- Time zone: UTC+02:00 (EET)
  - Summer (DST): UTC+03:00 (EEST)
- Postal code: 517005
- Area code: (+40) 02 58
- Vehicle reg.: AB
- Website: www.primariaalbac.ro

Albac (Hungarian: Fehérvölgy) is a commune located in Alba County, Transylvania, Romania. It has a population of 1,846 (as of 2021), and is composed of sixteen villages: Albac, Bărăști, Budăiești, Cionești, Costești, Dealu Lămășoi, Deve, După Pleșe, Fața, Pleșești, Potionci, Rogoz, Roșești, Rusești, Sohodol, and Tamborești.

Historical population
Year	Pop.	±%
1850	3,547	—
1900	5,805	+63.7%
1930	3,099	−46.6%
1966	3,539	+14.2%
2002	2,220	−37.3%
2011	2,089	−5.9%
2021	1,846	−11.6%
Source: INS, Census data

The administrative center of the commune is Albac village, which is located on the DN75 road, 17 km (11 mi) from Câmpeni, and is traversed by the Arieșul Mare River.
