= Arieșul Mare =

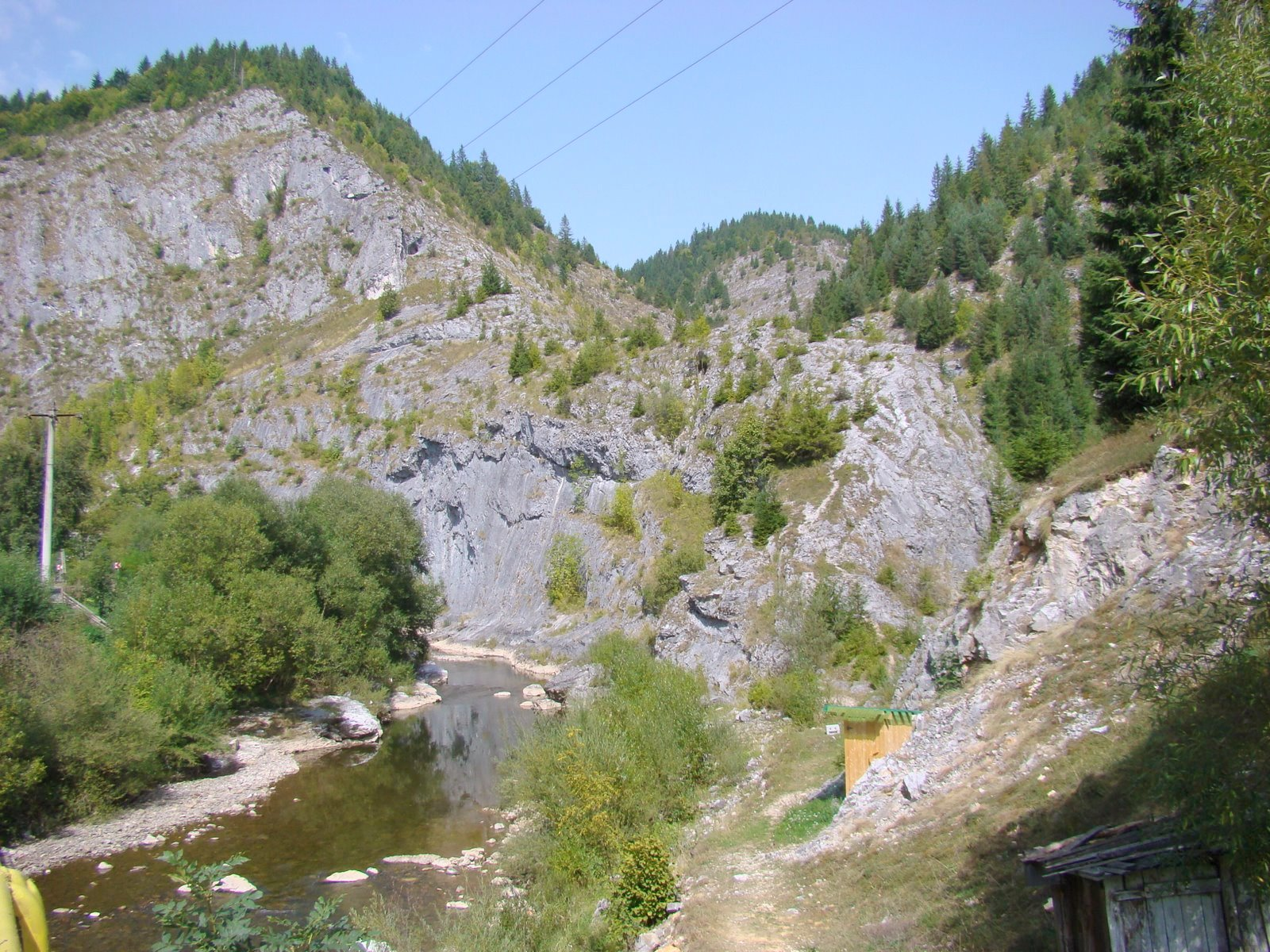

- Location within Romania

Location
- Country: Romania
- Counties: Alba County
- Villages: Arieșeni, Scărișoara, Albac

Physical characteristics
- Source: Mount Vârtopul
  - location: Bihor Mountains
  - coordinates: 46°30′23″N 22°40′53″E
  - elevation: 1,260 m (4,130 ft)
- Mouth: Arieș
  - location: Lake Mihoești near Câmpeni
  - coordinates: 46°22′20″N 23°01′01″E
  - elevation: 570 m (1,870 ft)

Basin features
- Progression: Arieș→ Mureș→ Tisza→ Danube→ Black Sea
- Tributaries
  - left: Gârda Seacă, Albac
  - right: Neagra

The Arieșul Mare (Hungarian: Nagy-Aranyos) is a river in the Apuseni Mountains, Alba County, western Romania. It is the left headwater of the river Arieș. It flows through the villages Arieșeni, Gârda de Sus, Scărișoara, Albac and Vadu Moților, and joins the Arieșul Mic (the other headwater) in Mihoești near Câmpeni. Its length is about 43 km (27 mi) and its basin size is about 400 km^{2} (150 sq mi).

== Tributaries ==
The following rivers are tributaries to the river Arieșul Mare (from source to mouth):

- Left: Cobleș, Gârda Seacă, Valea Starpă and Albac
- Right: Vârciorog, Valea Cepelor, Bucura, Ghizghiț and Neagra
