= Arieșeni =

- Commune
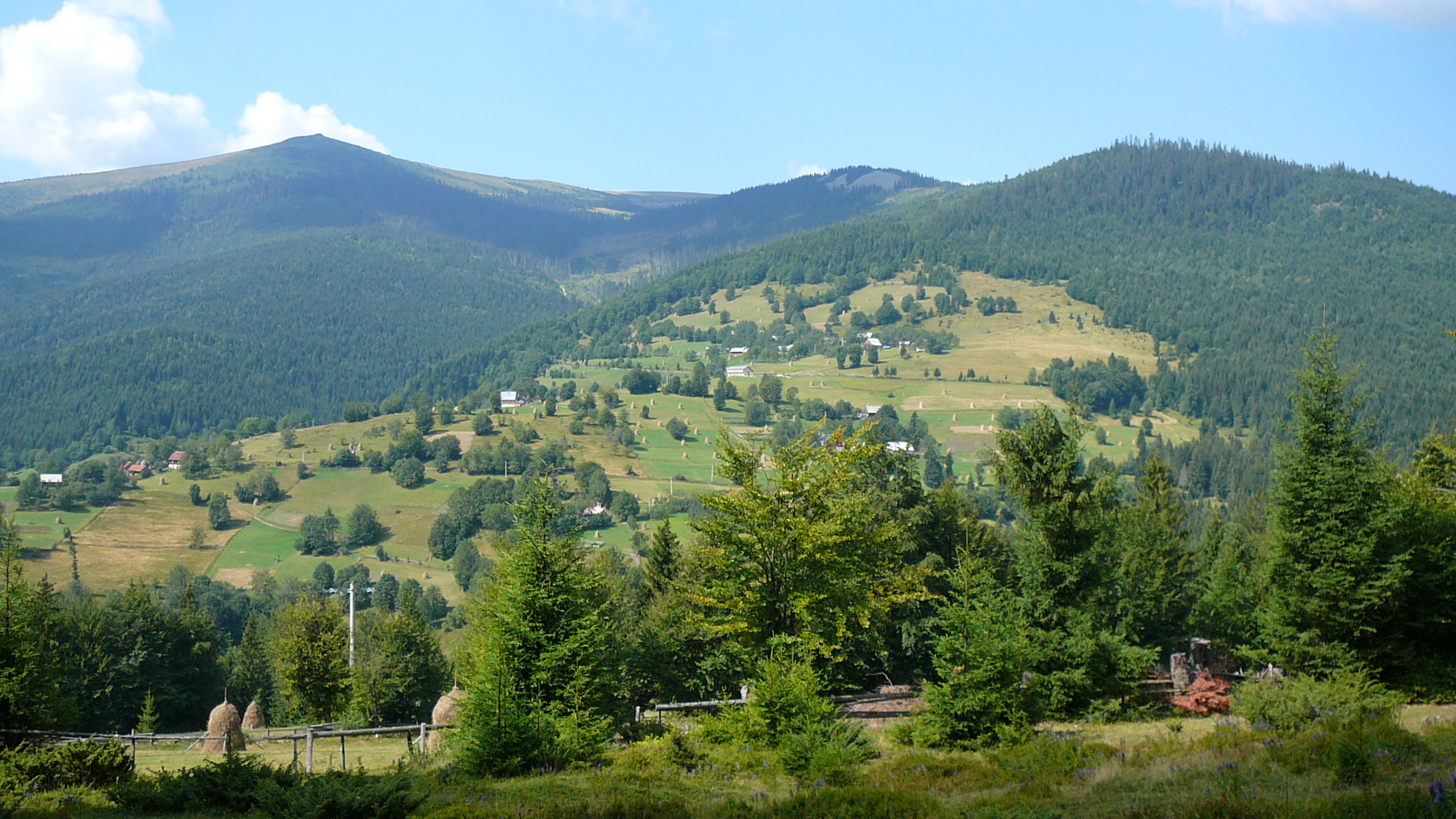

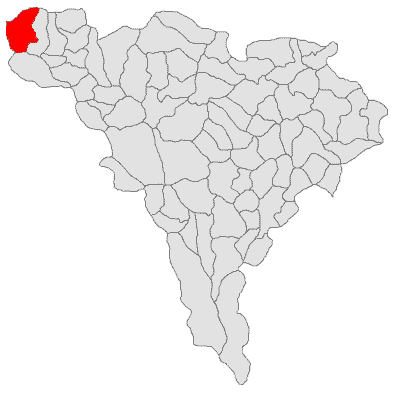
- Location in Alba County

- Location in Romania
- Coordinates: 46°29′N 22°46′E
- Country: Romania
- County: Alba

Government
  - Mayor (2020–2024): Gheorghe Pantea (PNL)
- Area: 33.22 km^{2} (12.83 sq mi)
- Elevation: 830 m (2,720 ft)
- Population (2021-12-01): 1,464
  - Density: 44.07/km^{2} (114.1/sq mi)
- Time zone: UTC+02:00 (EET)
  - Summer (DST): UTC+03:00 (EEST)
- Postal code: 517040
- Area code: +40 x58
- Vehicle reg.: AB
- Website: comuna-arieseni.ro

Arieșeni (German: Leppusch; Hungarian: Lepus) is a commune located in Alba County, Transylvania, Romania. It has a population of 1,464 as of 2021. The commune is composed of eighteen villages: Arieșeni, Avrămești, Bubești, Casa de Piatră, Cobleș, Dealu Bajului, Fața Cristesei, Fața Lăpușului, Galbena, Hodobana, Izlaz, Păntești, Pătrăhăițești, Poienița, Ravicești, Ștei-Arieșeni, Sturu, and Vanvucești.

Historical population
Year	Pop.	±%
1930	2,020	—
1966	2,990	+48.0%
2002	1,921	−35.8%
2011	1,765	−8.1%
2021	1,464	−17.1%
Source: INS, Census data

== Geography ==
The commune is located in the ethnogeographical region Țara Moților, in the northwestern corner of Alba County, on the border with Bihor County. It is crossed by national road DN75, which starts near Ștei, 39 km (24 mi) to the west, and runs to Câmpeni (the capital of Țara Moților), 41 km (25 mi) to the east, and on to Turda, where it joins DN1. The county seat, Alba Iulia, is 120 km (75 mi) to the southeast.

Arieșeni is nestled in the Apuseni Mountains, within the Bihor Massif, at the foot of the Cucurbăta Mare, which, at 1,849 m (6,066 ft), is the highest peak in the Apuseni Mountains. The river Arieșul Mare, which has its source in the nearby Mount Vârtopul, flows through Arieșeni.

== Tourism ==
Arieșeni is a very popular ski resort among the people of Bihor and Alba counties, having 3 ski slopes: the old one is about 500 metres (1,600 feet) long, the second about 1,000 m (3,300 ft) and the third one, opened in January 2011 is the longest, having 1,600 m (5,200 ft) in length. The first ski lift in Romania was installed in Arieșeni and with the opening of the new slope, the resort has also got a brand new funicular.

There are several other notable natural tourist sites in the area, including the Vârciorog Waterfall, the Scărișoara Cave, Groapa Ruginoasă, Piatra Grăitoare, Pătrăhăițești village, and the Cucurbăta Mare, also known as the Bihor Peak.
