= Scărișoara Cave =

Cave in Romania

- Scărișoara Glacier
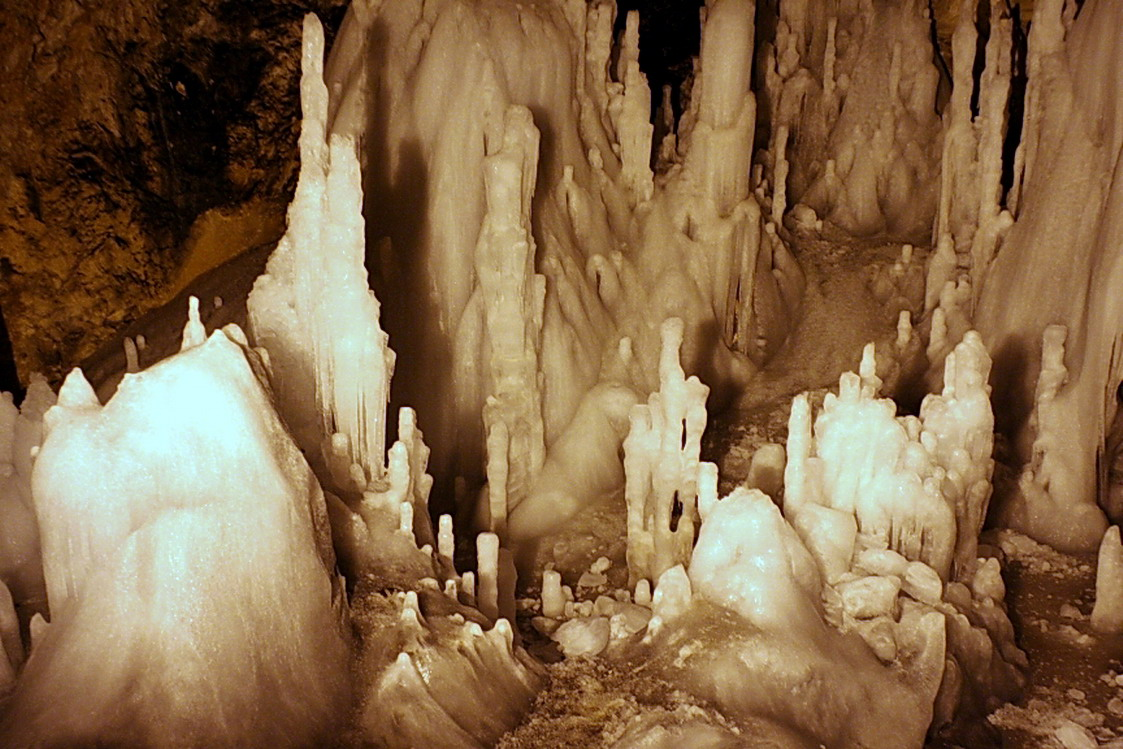
- The Church
- Interactive map of Scărișoara Cave
- Location: Gârda de Sus, Alba County, Romania
- Coordinates: 46°29′23″N 22°48′35″E
- Depth: 105 m
- Length: 720 m
- Elevation: 1,150 m (3,770 ft)
- Discovery: 1847
- Geology: Limestone
- Entrances: 1
- Access: Public
- Features: Stalactites, stalagmites, columns, parietal hangings, corallites, speleothems

Scărișoara Cave (Romanian: Peștera Scărișoara, Hungarian: Aranyosfői-jégbarlang), is one of the biggest ice caves in the Apuseni Mountains of Romania, in the western part of the Romanian Carpathians. It is considered a show cave and one of the natural wonders of Romania. It has also been described as a glacier cave.

== History ==
First mentioned in 1863 by the Austrian geographer Arnold Schmidl, who made some observations and the first map of the cave, it was later explored by the Romanian scientist and speleologist Emil Racoviță between 1921 and 1923, who mentioned it and its origin in his 1927 work Speologia (Speleology). The ice cave was formed 3,500 years ago, during the glaciations, when these mountains were covered by snow and ice. The exact date when the cave was first discovered by humans is unknown.

== Description ==
Stalagmite from The Church.

The cave is located at an altitude of approximately 1,150 m (3,770 ft) above sea level. It is 120 m (390 ft) deep and 720 m (2,360 ft) long. The entrance shaft, which is 60 m (200 ft) in diameter and 50 m (160 ft) in depth, gives access through metal stairs to a large chamber, the Great Hall, which is approximately 108 m (354 ft) long and 78 m (256 ft) wide. The Great Hall includes an ice cliff nearly 18 m (59 ft) tall, which overlooks a pool called the Pool of Ice.

From the Great Hall, passages lead into several other named rooms: the Church, which features over 100 ice stalagmites, the Great Reservation, Coman Gallery to the left, and Little Reservation to the right.

The ice within the cave has an estimated volume of 75,000 cubic metres (98,000 cubic yards) and in some places can be as thick as 20 m (66 ft). The temperature is up to +1 °C in the summer and down to -7 °C in the winter. In the part for tourists the average temperature is around 0 °C. Bats live in the ice cave, as do small beetles (2–3 mm long) called Pholeuon prozerpinae glaciale. In the Big Reservation a skeleton of an alpine chamois was discovered.

== Cave formation ==
The cave is part of the Ghețar–Ocoale–Dobrești karst system. It is composed of Upper Jurassic limestone, which lies monoclinally in a NW–SE direction, on the edge of the Ghețari–Ocoale karst plateau. Once, the water in the Ocoale Valley flowed entirely on the surface, but with the formation of the karst network (including Scărișoara Cave), streams and precipitation infiltrated underground. The water flowed to the surface through Pojarul Poliței Cave. As dissolution continued, the water descended into the Avenul din Șesuri Sinkhole, emerging on the surface at Izbucul Poliței Nature Reserve. The remaining dry void of Scărișoara, following the collapse of the entrance sinkhole, fills with ice during glaciations.

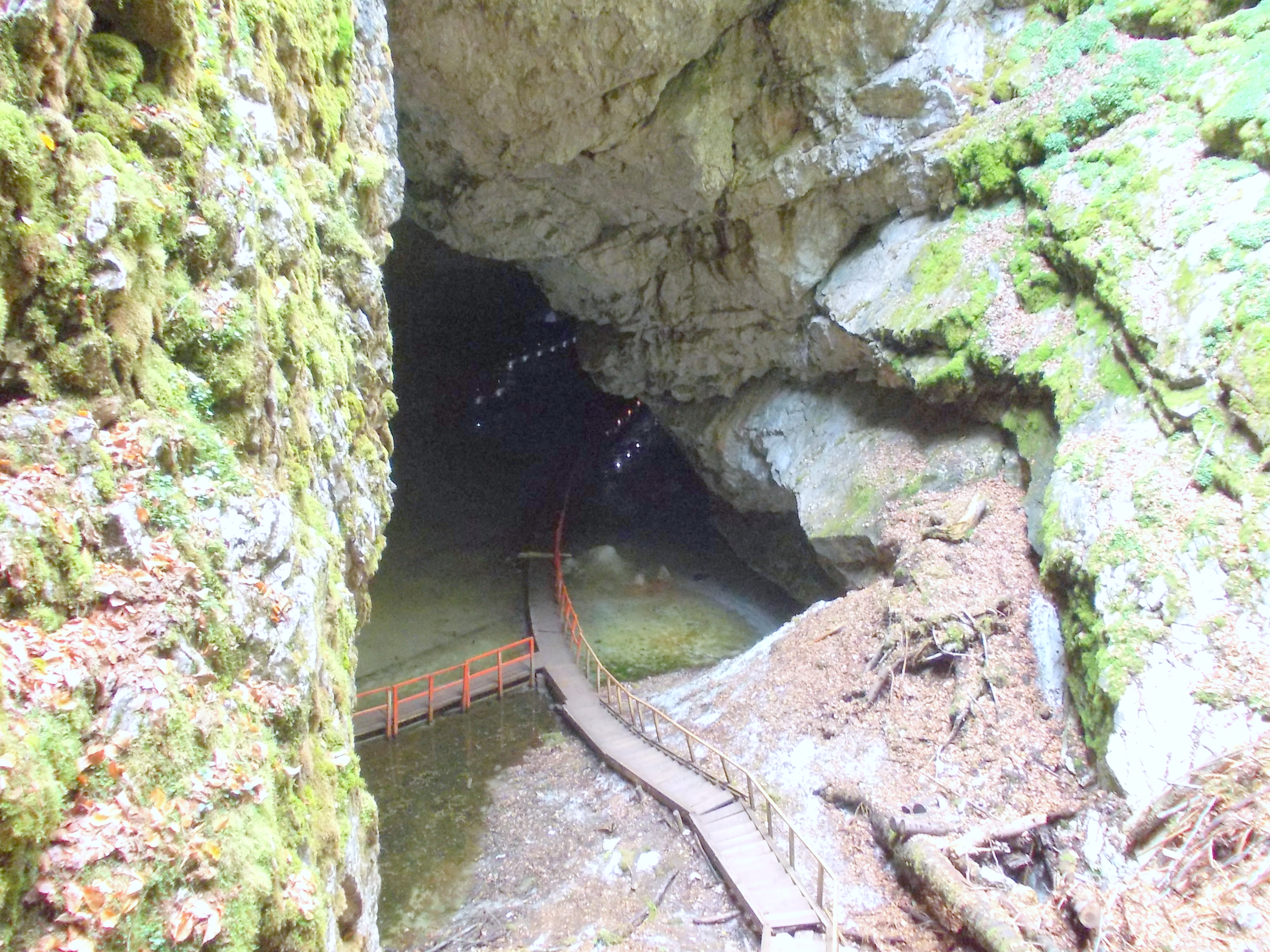
Scărișoara Cave

== Access ==
The portion of the cave open to tourists includes the entrance shaft, The Big Hall and The Church. Access to the other chambers is reserved for scientific research by the agreement of the Speological Institute of Cluj-Napoca.

== See also ==
- List of caves in Romania
- Apuseni Natural Park
- Seven Natural Wonders of Romania
