= Corbasca =

- Commune
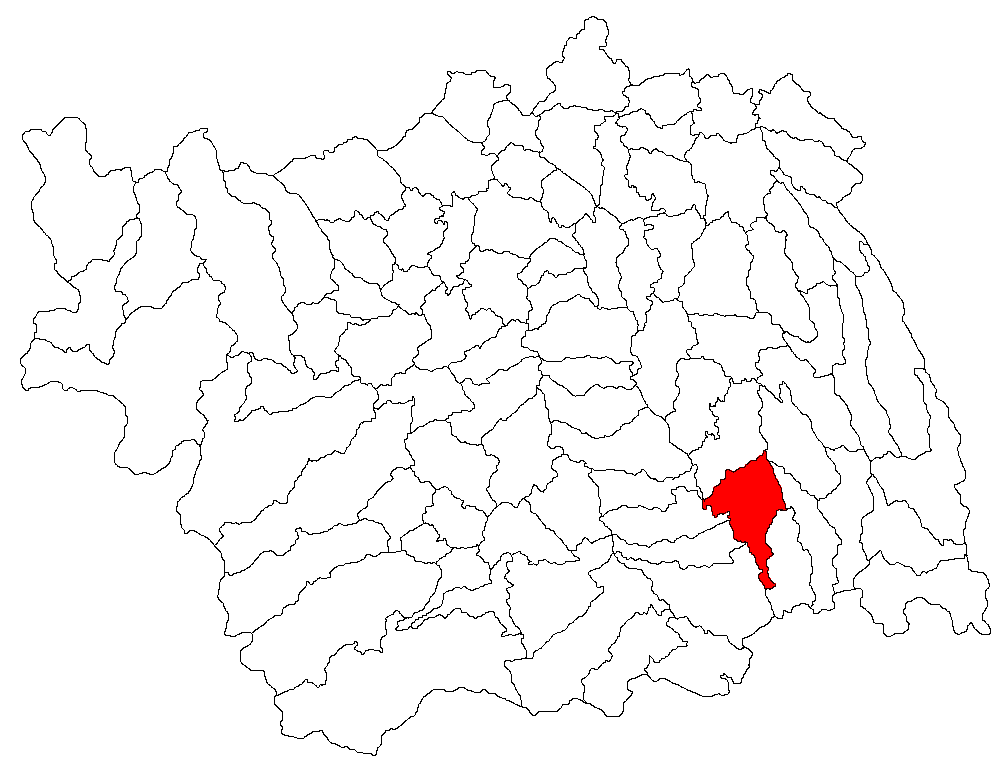
- Location in Bacău County

- Location in Romania
- Coordinates: 46°17′N 27°10′E
- Country: Romania
- County: Bacău

Government
  - Mayor (2020–2024): Nicușor Pușcașu-Andone (PSD)
- Area: 62.62 km^{2} (24.18 sq mi)
- Elevation: 186 m (610 ft)
- Population (2021-12-01): 4,811
  - Density: 77/km^{2} (200/sq mi)
- Time zone: EET/EEST (UTC+2/+3)
- Postal code: 607120
- Area code: +(40) 234
- Vehicle reg.: BC
- Website: www.primariacorbasca.ro

Corbasca (Hungarian: Korbászka) is a commune in Bacău County, Western Moldavia, Romania. It is composed of seven villages: Băcioiu, Corbasca, Marvila, Pogleț, Rogoaza, Scărișoara, and Vâlcele.

Historical population
Year	Pop.	±%
2002	5,365	—
2011	4,914	−8.4%
2021	4,811	−2.1%
Source: Census data

At the 2011 census, the commune had 4,914 inhabitants, of which 64.5% were Romanians and 35.4% Roma. At the 2021 census, Corbasca had a population of 4,811; of those, 46.1% were Romanians and 44.27% Roma.
