= Babele =

Rock formation in Romania

Coordinates: 45.406576°N 25.4715989°E

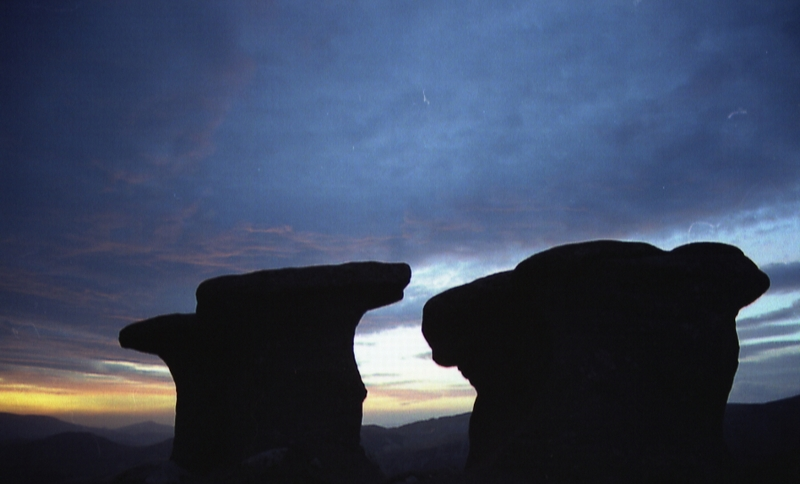
Babele

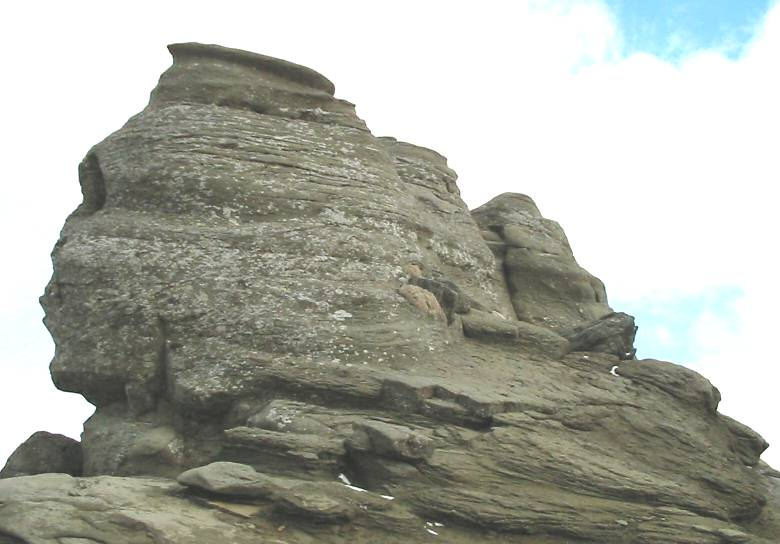
The Sphinx

Babele (meaning The old women) is the name for an area on the Bucegi Mountains plateau in Romania, within the Southern Carpathians.

Babele is one of the most popular tourist destinations in the country. The name comes from some mushroom shaped rock formations, the result of erosion and varying hardness of the rock layers.

The Bucegi Sphinx is another rock formation in the same area, named for its sphinx-like appearance.

The Babele chalet is accessible either by cable car from Bușteni or by road. It can also be reached by foot, coming from Bușteni through Valea Jepilor (Juniper Valley), or from the crest of the Bucegi Mountains, coming from the Piatra Arsă (The Burned Rock) chalet.

== See also ==
- Baba Dochia – Romanian mythical figure
- Seven Natural Wonders of Romania
