= Scundu =

- Commune
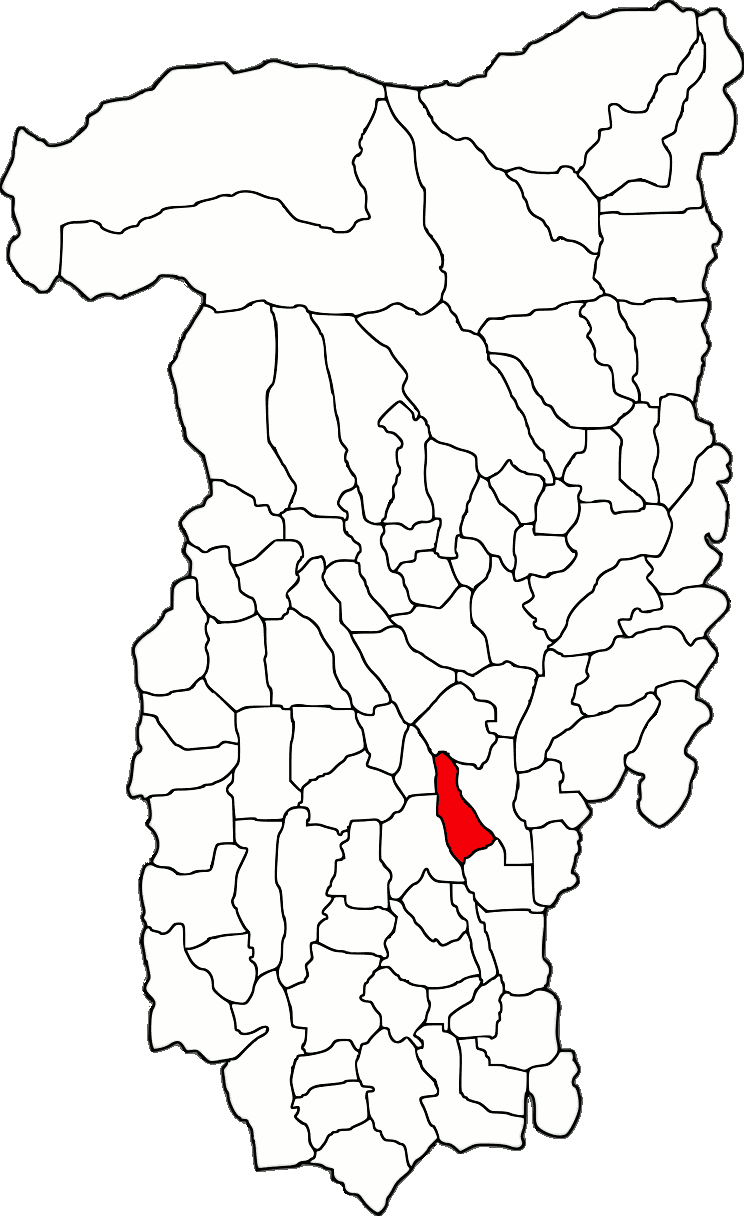
- Location in Vâlcea County

- Location in Romania
- Coordinates: 44°50′N 24°12′E
- Country: Romania
- County: Vâlcea

Government
  - Mayor (2021–2024): Mihăiță-George Blejan
- Area: 34.99 km^{2} (13.51 sq mi)
- Population (2021-12-01): 1,723
  - Density: 49.24/km^{2} (127.5/sq mi)
- Time zone: UTC+02:00 (EET)
  - Summer (DST): UTC+03:00 (EEST)
- Vehicle reg.: VL

Scundu is a commune located in Vâlcea County, Oltenia, Romania. It is composed of four villages: Avrămești, Blejani, Crângu and Scundu.
