= Avram Iancu, Alba =

Avram Iancu
- Commune
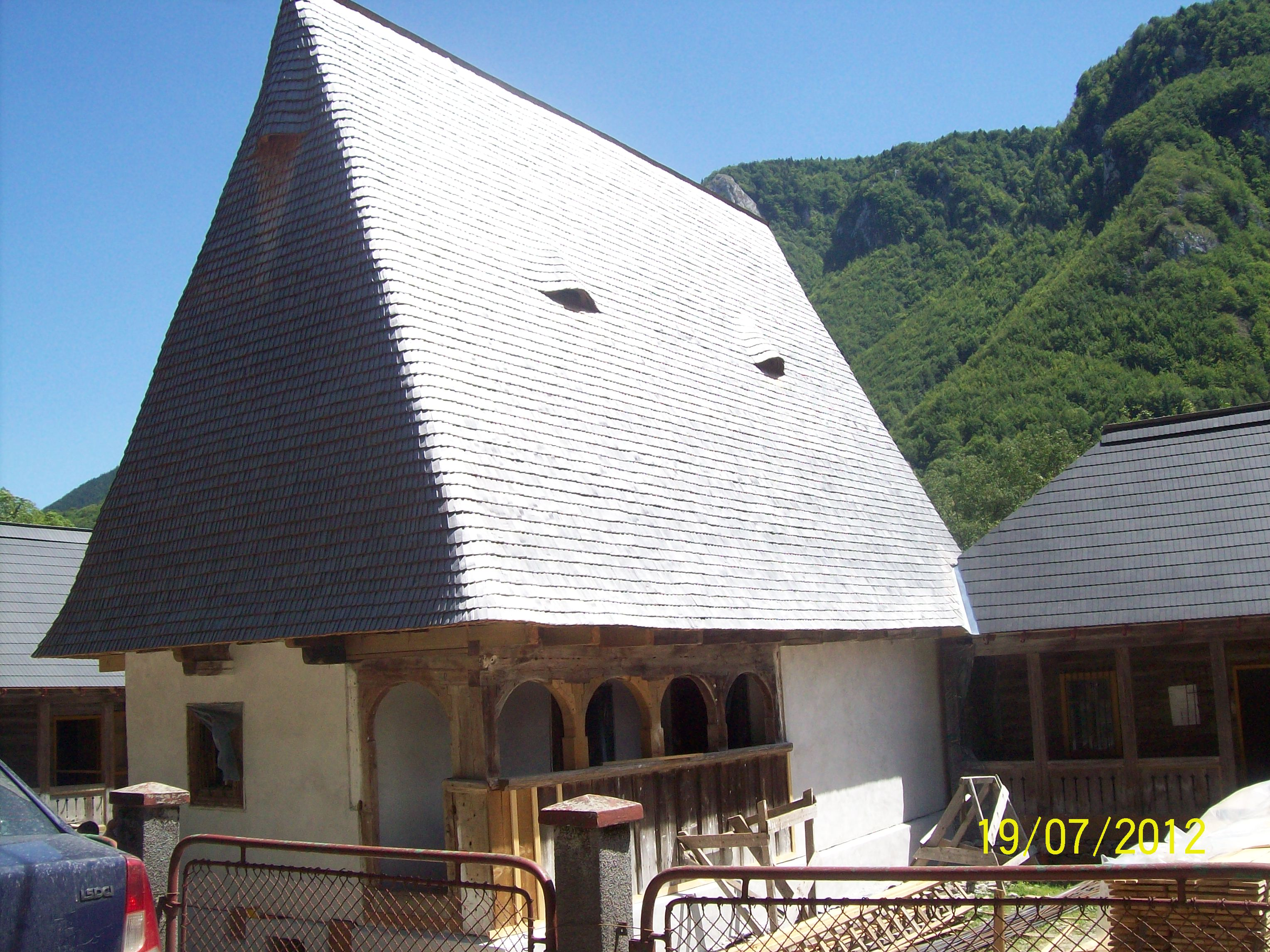
- Avram Iancu memorial house

- Coat of arms

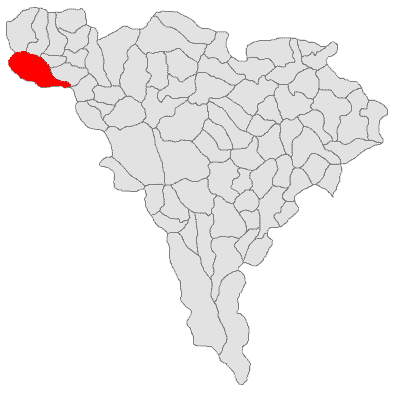
- Location in Alba County

- Location in Romania
- Coordinates: 46°23′N 22°47′E
- Country: Romania
- County: Alba

Government
  - Mayor (2020–2024): Sandu Heler (PNL)
- Area: 97.19 km^{2} (37.53 sq mi)
- Elevation: 780 m (2,560 ft)
- Population (2021-12-01): 1,271
  - Density: 13.08/km^{2} (33.87/sq mi)
- Time zone: UTC+02:00 (EET)
  - Summer (DST): UTC+03:00 (EEST)
- Postal code: 517065
- Area code: +(40) x58
- Vehicle reg.: AB
- Website: www.primariaavramiancu.ro

Avram Iancu (Hungarian: Felsővidra, German: Ober-Wider) is a commune located in Alba County, Transylvania, Romania. It is composed of thirty-three villages: Achimețești, Avram Iancu, Avrămești, Bădăi, Boldești, Călugărești, Cârăști, Cârțulești, Căsoaia, Cândești, Cocești, Cocoșești, Coroiești, Dealu Crișului, Dolești, Dumăcești, Gojeiești, Helerești, Incești, Jojei, Mărtești, Orgești, Pătruțești, Plai, Pușelești, Șoicești, Ștertești, Târsa, Târsa-Plai, Valea Maciului, Valea Uțului, Verdești, and Vidrișoara.

Part of Vidra Commune and called Vidra de Sus until 1924, the commune was renamed after Avram Iancu, a national hero of Romania born here. The principal tourist attractions are the Avram Iancu Memorial House and the extensive network of alpine guest houses maintained by the local inhabitants. The area is famous for its scenic alpine landscapes and for organic gourmet foods. The main economic activities in the community are: agriculture (mainly animal husbandry), logging and since the 2000s, the fast-growing alpine agro-tourism attracting people from all over Europe.

Historical population
Year	Pop.	±%
1850	1,953	—
1912	3,112	+59.3%
1930	3,880	+24.7%
1966	4,020	+3.6%
2002	1,865	−53.6%
2011	1,636	−12.3%
2021	1,271	−22.3%
Source: INS, Census data

Its mayor as of 2021 is Sandu Heler. At the 2021 census, Avram Iancu had a population of 1,271. According to the census from 2011, the commune had a total population of 1,636; of those, 86.37% were ethnic Romanians and 10.09% ethnic Romani.
