= Vidra, Alba =

Vidra
- Commune
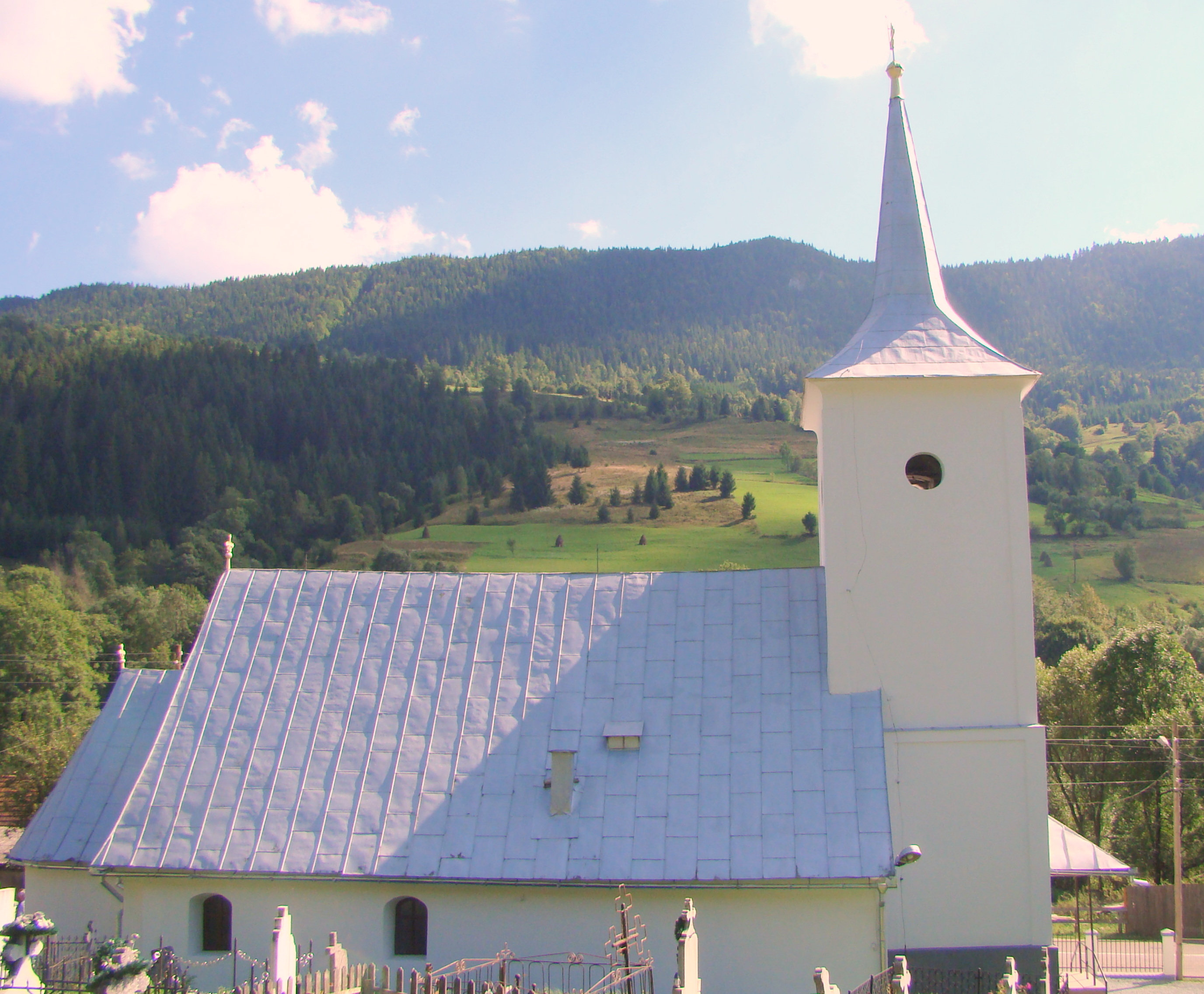
- Archangels' church in Vidra

- Location in Alba County

- Location in Romania
- Coordinates: 46°22′02″N 22°52′57″E
- Country: Romania
- County: Alba

Government
  - Mayor (2020–2024): Doru Petricele (PSD)
- Area: 60.2 km^{2} (23.2 sq mi)
- Elevation: 645 m (2,116 ft)
- Highest elevation: 1,298 m (4,259 ft)
- Lowest elevation: 600 m (2,000 ft)
- Population (2021-12-01): 1,367
  - Density: 22.7/km^{2} (58.8/sq mi)
- Time zone: UTC+02:00 (EET)
  - Summer (DST): UTC+03:00 (EEST)
- Postal code: 517825
- Area code: (+40) 0258
- Vehicle reg.: AB
- Website: primariavidra-ab.ro

Vidra (Hungarian: Alsóvidra or Kisaranyos) is a commune, located in Alba County, Transylvania, Romania. It is the commune with the second highest number of villages (39) in Romania. These are: Băi, Bobărești, Bogdănești, Bordeștii Poieni, Culdești, Dealu Goiești, Dos, Dosu Luncii, Dosu Văsești, Drăgoiești-Luncă, Ficărești, Gligorești, Goiești, Haiducești, Hărăști, Hoancă, Jeflești, Lunca, Lunca Bisericii, Lunca de Jos, Lunca Goiești, Lunca Vesești, Modolești, Nemeși, Oidești, Pitărcești, Pleșcuța, Poieni, Ponorel (Aranyosponor), Puiulețești, Runc, Segaj, Urdeș, Vâlcăneasa, Vâlcești, Valea Morii, Vârtănești, Văsești and Vidra. It also included Vidra de Sus and other villages until 1924, when they were split off to form Avram Iancu Commune.

The commune, and the area surrounding it (Țara Vidrelor), is named after the otter, a semiaquatic mammal which lives around there. The area has been inhabited since the Dacians and the Roman conquest, due to its proximity to the gold mining sites of the Apuseni Mountains.

Its current mayor is Doru Petricele, elected in 2020. The previous mayor, Ioan Alexandru Resiga, was in office from 2004 until 2020.

Historical population
Year	Pop.	±%
1850	3,531	—
1880	4,141	+17.3%
1900	4,426	+6.9%
1920	4,421	−0.1%
1956	4,641	+5.0%
1977	3,653	−21.3%
1992	2,444	−33.1%
2002	1,964	−19.6%
2011	1,691	−13.9%
2021	1,367	−19.2%
Source: Census data
