= Scărișoara, Alba =

Scărișoara
- Commune
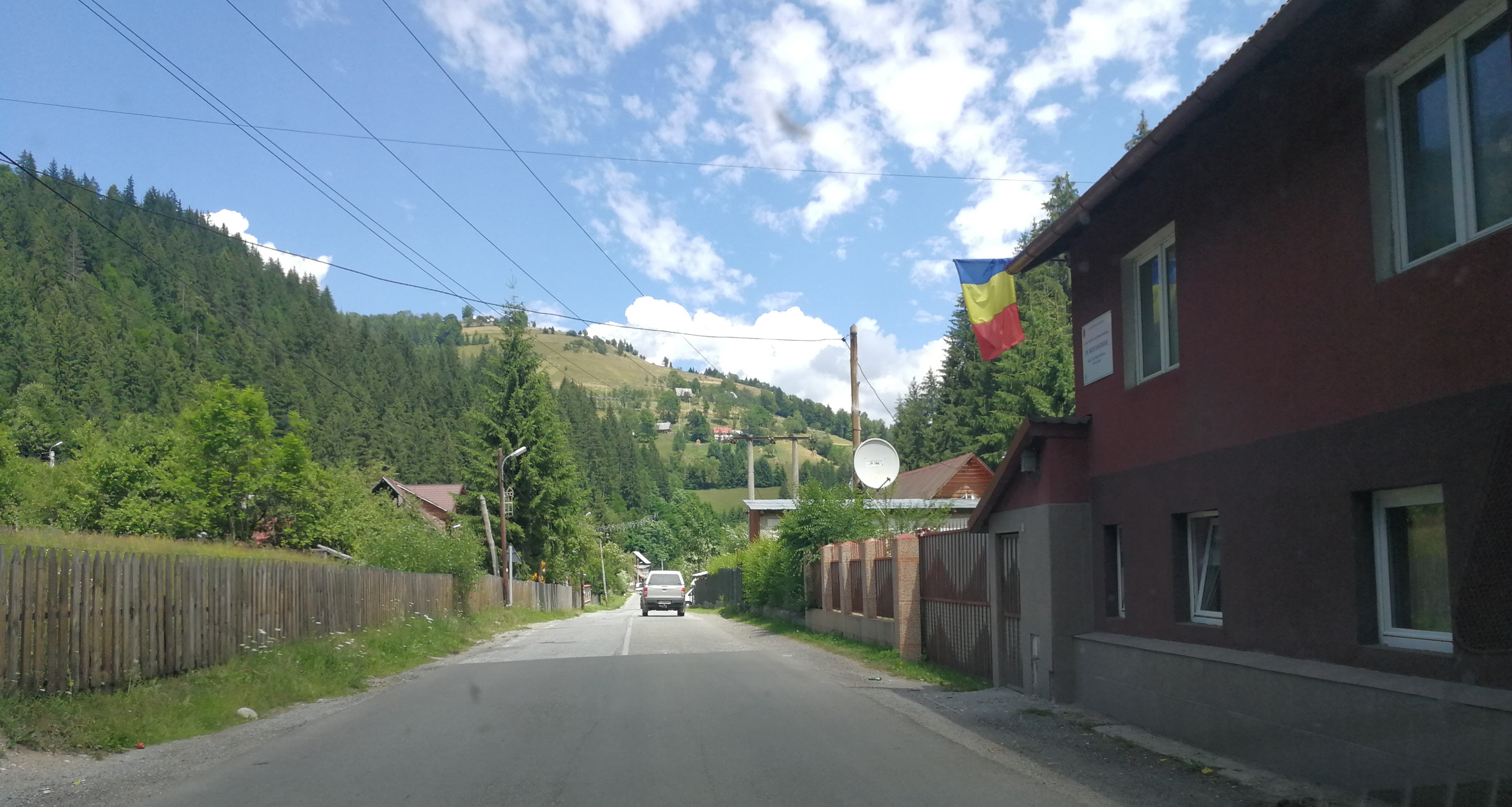
- View of Scărișoara

- Location in Alba County

- Location in Romania
- Coordinates: 46°27′24″N 22°52′26″E
- Country: Romania
- County: Alba

Government
  - Mayor (2020–2024): Cristian-Vasile Costea (PNL)
- Area: 94.41 km^{2} (36.45 sq mi)
- Elevation: 700 m (2,300 ft)
- Highest elevation: 1,399 m (4,590 ft)
- Population (2021-12-01): 1,391
  - Density: 14.73/km^{2} (38.16/sq mi)
- Time zone: UTC+02:00 (EET)
  - Summer (DST): UTC+03:00 (EEST)
- Postal code: 517680
- Area code: (+40) 02 58
- Vehicle reg.: AB
- Website: www.scarisoara.ro

Scărișoara (Hungarian: Aranyosfő) is a commune located in Alba County, Transylvania, Romania. It is composed of fourteen villages: Bârlești, Botești (Botesbánya), Fața-Lăzești, Florești, Lăzești (Lezest), Lespezea, Maței, Negești, Preluca, Runc, Scărișoara, Sfoartea, Știuleți, and Trâncești.

== Geography ==
The commune is situated in the Țara Moților ethnogeographical region of the Apuseni Mountains, at the foot of the Bihor Massif. Most of the component villages lie at an altitude of over 1,000 m (3,300 ft), with Preluca at 1,300 m (4,300 ft) and Runc at 1,340 m (4,400 ft). The surface area is 9,441 ha (23,330 acres), with about 75% forested land and 20% agricultural land.

Scărișoara is located in the northwestern corner of Alba County, on the border with Cluj County and near the border with Bihor County. The nearest town is Câmpeni, 29 km (18 mi) to the southeast; the county capital, Alba Iulia is some further 80 km (50 mi) away, in the same general direction.

The commune is crossed by national road DN17, which runs from a major junction in Turda, Cluj County, through Câmpeni and Scărișoara, and on to Ștei, Bihor County, where it connects to European route E79.

The Scărișoara Cave is some 9 km (5.6 mi) to the northwest, on the territory of the neighboring commune of Gârda de Sus.

== Demographics ==
Historical population
Year	Pop.	±%
2002	1,850	—
2011	1,661	−10.2%
2021	1,391	−16.3%
Source: Census data

At the 2011 census, the commune had a population of 1,661, of which 82% were ethnic Romanians and 15.29% Roma. As of the 2021 census, the population had decreased to 1,391, of which 85.48% were ethnic Romanians and 10.28% Roma.
