= Vadu Moților =

- Commune
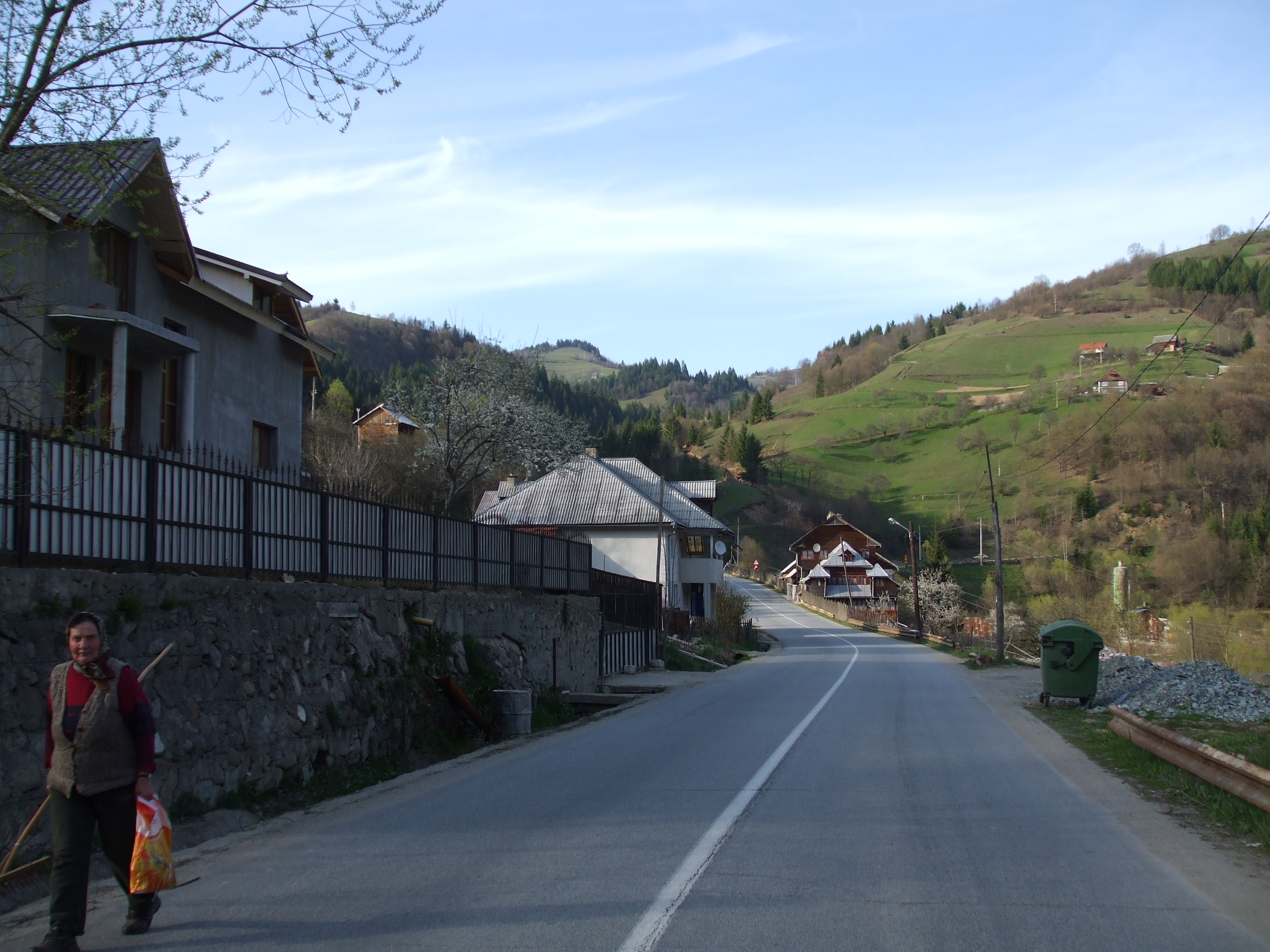
- Vadu Moților village

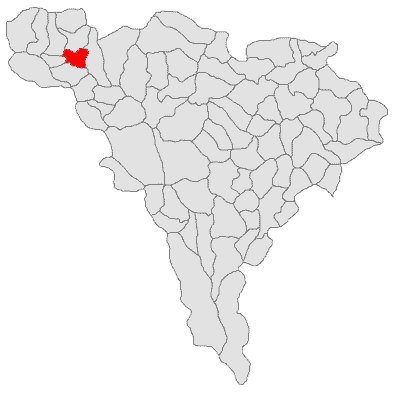
- Location in Alba County

- Location in Romania
- Coordinates: 46°24′N 22°58′E
- Country: Romania
- County: Alba

Government
  - Mayor (2020–2024): Nicolae Lazea (PNL)
- Area: 32.14 km^{2} (12.41 sq mi)
- Elevation: 731 m (2,398 ft)
- Highest elevation: 1,400 m (4,600 ft)
- Population (2021-12-01): 1,187
  - Density: 36.93/km^{2} (95.65/sq mi)
- Time zone: UTC+02:00 (EET)
  - Summer (DST): UTC+03:00 (EEST)
- Postal code: 517795
- Area code: (+40) 0258
- Vehicle reg.: AB
- Website: vadumotilor.ro

Vadu Moților (German: Goldenau; Hungarian: Aranyosvágás) is a commune located in Alba County, Transylvania, Romania. It is composed of twelve villages: Bodești, Burzești, Dealu Frumos, Lăzești, Necșești, Poduri-Bricești, Popeștii de Jos, Popeștii de Sus, Tomuțești, Toțești, Vadu Moților, and Vâltori. Until January 1, 1965, both the commune and the village of Vadu Moților were named Secătura.

The commune belongs to the Țara Moților ethnogeographical region. It is nestled within the Apuseni Mountains, between the Bihor Mountains to the west and Muntele Mare to the east.

Vadu Moților lies on the banks of the river Arieșul Mare, at the confluence with its tributary, the river Neagra. It is located in the northwestern corner of Alba County, at a distance of 12 km (7.5 mi) from the town of Câmpeni and 92 km (57 mi) from the county seat, Alba Iulia.

Historical population
Year	Pop.	±%
1850	1,339	—
1880	1,795	+34.1%
1900	1,845	+2.8%
1920	1,889	+2.4%
1941	2,270	+20.2%
1977	2,031	−10.5%
1992	1,634	−19.5%
2002	1,558	−4.7%
2011	1,348	−13.5%
2021	1,187	−11.9%
Source: INS, Census data

At the 2021 census, the commune had a population of 1,187; of those, 97.05% were Romanians.
