= Gârda de Sus =

- Commune
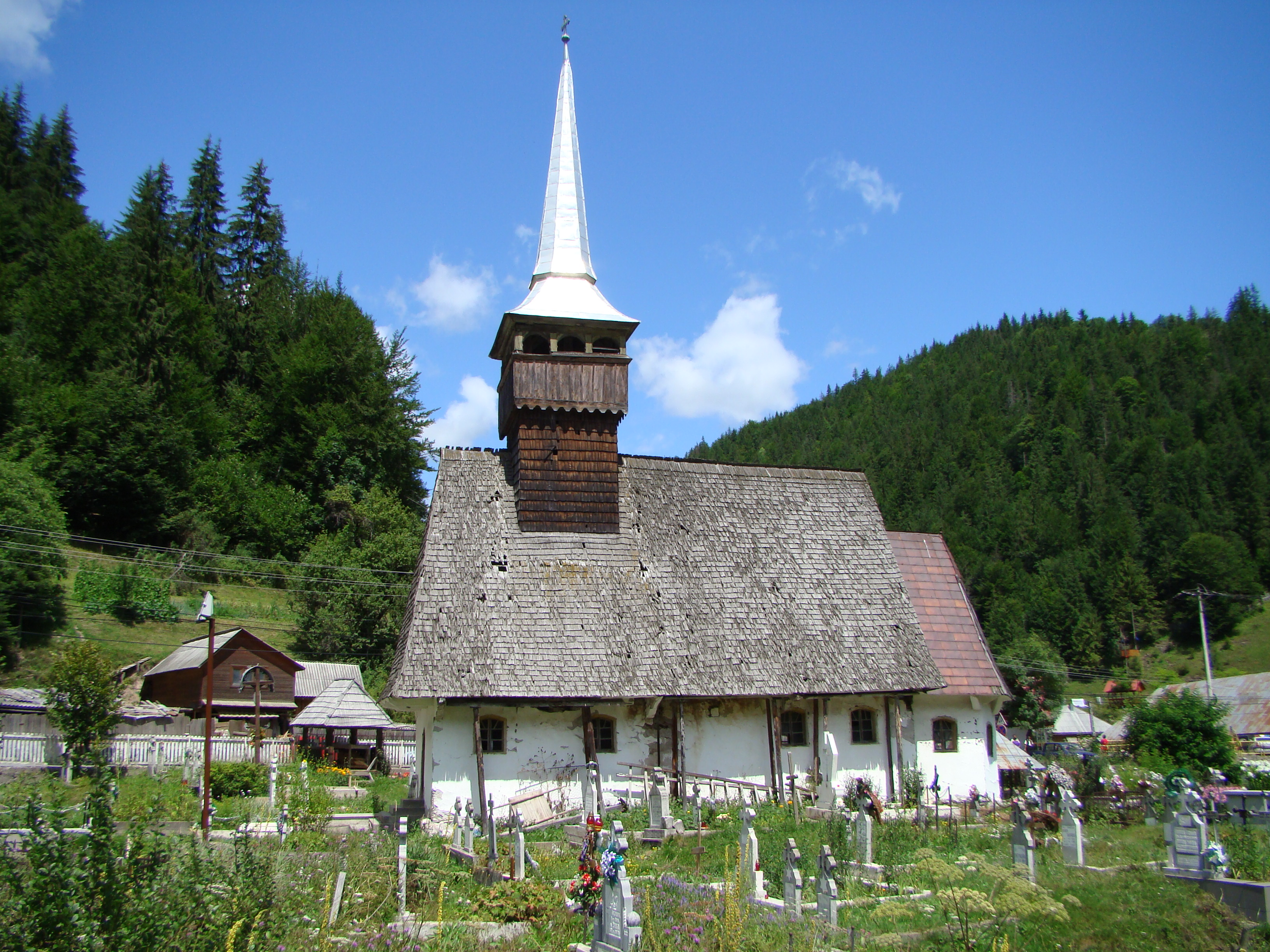
- Wooden church in Gârda de Sus

- Coat of arms

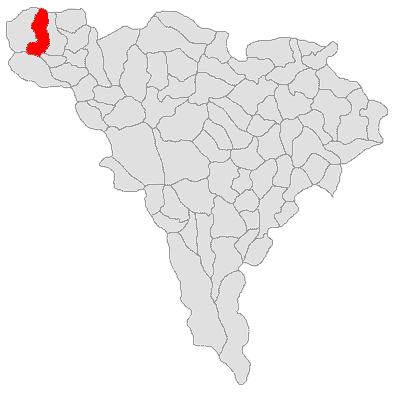
- Location in Alba County

- Location in Romania
- Coordinates: 46°27′N 22°49′E
- Country: Romania
- County: Alba

Government
  - Mayor (2020–2024): Marin Vârciu (PNL)
- Area: 82.11 km^{2} (31.70 sq mi)
- Elevation: 729 m (2,392 ft)
- Population (2021-12-01): 1,415
  - Density: 17.23/km^{2} (44.63/sq mi)
- Time zone: UTC+02:00 (EET)
  - Summer (DST): UTC+03:00 (EEST)
- Postal code: 517310
- Area code: (+40) 02 58
- Vehicle reg.: AB
- Website: comunagardadesus.ro

Gârda de Sus (Hungarian: Felsőgirda; German: Obergierd) is a commune located in Alba County, Transylvania, Romania. It has a population of 1,415 as of 2021, and is composed of seventeen villages: Biharia, Dealu Frumos, Dealu Ordâncușii, Dobrești, Gârda de Sus, Gârda Seacă (Alsógirda), Ghețari (Jégbarlang), Hănășești, Huzărești, Izvoarele, Munună, Ocoale, Plai, Pliști, Scoarța, Snide, and Sucești.

The main village of the commune is located 30 kilometres (19 mi) northwest of Câmpeni. It houses a wooded church built in 1792 with naive paintings inside. It is also the starting point for the hikes to the Ordâncușa gorges, the glacier of Scărișoara and the Padiș plateau.
