= Valea Negrileștilor =

- Location within Romania

Location
- Country: Romania
- Counties: Cluj County, Bistrița-Năsăud County
- Villages: Huta, Negrilești

Physical characteristics
- Mouth: Valea Mare
  - location: Negrilești
  - coordinates: 47.2699°N 24.0474°E
- Length: 11 km (6.8 mi)
- Basin size: 24 km^{2} (9.3 sq mi)

Basin features
- Progression: Valea Mare→ Someșul Mare→ Someș→ Tisza→ Danube→ Black Sea

The Valea Negrileștilor is a right tributary of the Valea Mare in Romania. It flows into the Valea Mare in Negrilești. Its length is 11 km (6.8 mi) and its basin size is 24 km^{2} (9.3 sq mi).
