= Măria =

- Location within Romania

Location
- Country: Romania
- Counties: Bistrița-Năsăud County

Physical characteristics
- Source: Suhard Mountains
- Mouth: Someșul Mare
  - coordinates: 47°28′18″N 24°57′36″E
  - elevation: 697 m (2,287 ft)
- Length: 12 km (7.5 mi)
- Basin size: 48 km^{2} (19 sq mi)

Basin features
- Progression: Someșul Mare→ Someș→ Tisza→ Danube→ Black Sea
- Tributaries
  - left: Măria Mică

The Măria (in its upper course: Măria Mare) is a left tributary of the Someșul Mare in Romania. It discharges into the Someșul Mare near Valea Mare. Its length is 12 km (7.5 mi) and its basin size is 48 km^{2} (19 sq mi).
