= Anies =

Anies may refer to:

- Anies Baswedan, an Indonesian politician
- Anieș, a river in Bistrița-Năsăud County, Romania
- Anieș, a village in the commune Maieru, Bistrița-Năsăud County, Romania

== See also ==
- Antes (name)
