= Feldrișel =

- Location within Romania

Location
- Country: Romania
- Counties: Bistrița-Năsăud County

Physical characteristics
- Source: Rodna Mountains
- Mouth: Someșul Mare
  - location: Feldru
  - coordinates: 47.2748°N 24.5974°E
- Length: 15 km (9.3 mi)
- Basin size: 30 km^{2} (12 sq mi)

Basin features
- Progression: Someșul Mare→ Someș→ Tisza→ Danube→ Black Sea
- Tributaries
  - right: Dumni

The Feldrișel is a right tributary of the river Someșul Mare in Romania. It discharges into the Someșul Mare in Feldru. Its length is 15 km (9.3 mi) and its basin size is 30 km^{2} (12 sq mi).
