= Runc (Someșul Mare) =

Runc Idieș
- Location within Romania

Location
- Country: Romania
- Counties: Bistrița-Năsăud County
- Villages: Runcu Salvei

Physical characteristics
- Mouth: Someșul Mare
  - location: Mititei
  - coordinates: 47.2891°N 24.3294°E
- Length: 19 km (12 mi)
- Basin size: 51 km^{2} (20 sq mi)

Basin features
- Progression: Someșul Mare→ Someș→ Tisza→ Danube→ Black Sea
- Tributaries
  - left: Valea Socilor

The Runc or Idieș is a right tributary of the river Someșul Mare in Romania. It discharges into the Someșul Mare in Mititei. Its length is 19 km (12 mi) and its basin size is 51 km^{2} (20 sq mi).
