= Rebra (river) =

- Location within Romania

Location
- Country: Romania
- Counties: Bistrița-Năsăud County
- Villages: Parva, Rebra

Physical characteristics
- Source: Rodna Mountains
- Mouth: Someșul Mare
  - location: Upstream of Rebrișoara
  - coordinates: 47.2857°N 24.4771°E
- Length: 44 km (27 mi)
- Basin size: 199 km^{2} (77 sq mi)

Basin features
- Progression: Someșul Mare→ Someș→ Tisza→ Danube→ Black Sea
- Tributaries
  - left: Gușatul Mare, Valea Satului

The Rebra is a right tributary of the river Someșul Mare in Romania. Its source is in the Rodna Mountains. It discharges into the Someșul Mare near Rebrișoara. Its length is 44 km (27 mi) and its basin size is 199 km^{2} (77 sq mi). The upper reach of the river, upstream from the confluence with the Gușatul Mare at Gura Rebra, is also known as Rebrișoara.
