= Valea Mare (Someșul Mare) =

- Location within Romania

Location
- Country: Romania
- Counties: Bistrița-Năsăud County
- Communes: Negrilești, Ciceu-Giurgești, Petru Rareș

Physical characteristics
- Mouth: Someșul Mare
  - location: Reteag
  - coordinates: 47.1771°N 24.0187°E

Basin features
- Progression: Someșul Mare→ Someș→ Tisza→ Danube→ Black Sea
- Tributaries
  - right: Valea Negrileștilor, Canciu

The Valea Mare is a right tributary of the river Someșul Mare in Romania. It discharges into the Someșul Mare in Reteag. Its length is 26 km (16 mi) and its basin size is 155 km^{2} (60 sq mi).
