= Purcăreț =

Purcăreț may refer to several villages in Romania:

- Purcăreți, a village in Pianu Commune, Alba County
- Purcărete, a village in Negrilești Commune, Bistrița-Năsăud County
- Purcăreț, a village in Letca Commune, Sălaj County
