= Cobășel =

Cobășel Cobățel
- Location within Romania

Location
- Country: Romania
- Counties: Bistrița-Năsăud County
- Villages: Șanț

Physical characteristics
- Source: Rodna Mountains, Mount Ineuț
  - coordinates: 47°30′37″N 24°53′58″E
  - elevation: 1,702 m (5,584 ft)
- Mouth: Someșul Mare
  - location: Șanț
  - coordinates: 47°26′17″N 24°53′19″E
  - elevation: 585 m (1,919 ft)
- Length: 9 km (5.6 mi)
- Basin size: 20 km^{2} (7.7 sq mi)

Basin features
- Progression: Someșul Mare→ Someș→ Tisza→ Danube→ Black Sea

The Cobășel or Cobățel is a right tributary of the river Someșul Mare in Romania. It discharges into the Someșul Mare in Șanț. Its length is 9 km (5.6 mi) and its basin size is 20 km^{2} (7.7 sq mi).
