= Preluci (river) =

- Location within Romania

Location
- Country: Romania
- Counties: Bistriţa-Năsăud County

Physical characteristics
- Source: Poiana Rotundă
  - location: Suhard Mountains
  - coordinates: 47°32′11″N 25°01′26″E
  - elevation: 1,258 m (4,127 ft)
- Mouth: Someșul Mare
  - coordinates: 47°30′31″N 24°59′43″E
  - elevation: 890 m (2,920 ft)

Basin features
- Progression: Someșul Mare→ Someș→ Tisza→ Danube→ Black Sea
- Tributaries
  - left: Corbu

The Preluci is a headwater of the river Someșul Mare in Romania. Its source is on Poiana Rotundă, in the western part of the Suhard Mountains. It forms part of the western delimitation of the Suhard Mountains.
