= Cârțibavul Mare =

- Location within Romania

Location
- Country: Romania
- Counties: Bistrița-Năsăud County
- Villages and towns: Șanț

Physical characteristics
- Source: Bârgău Mountains
  - coordinates: 47°25′44″N 24°57′05″E
  - elevation: 985 m (3,232 ft)
- Mouth: Someșul Mare
  - location: Șanț
  - coordinates: 47°26′17″N 24°53′24″E
  - elevation: 584 m (1,916 ft)
- Length: 8 km (5.0 mi)
- Basin size: 29 km^{2} (11 sq mi)

Basin features
- Progression: Someșul Mare→ Someș→ Tisza→ Danube→ Black Sea

The Cârțibavul Mare is a left tributary of the Someșul Mare river in Romania. It discharges into the Someșul Mare at Șanț. Its length is 8 km (5.0 mi), and its basin size is 29 km^{2} (11 sq mi).
