= Gersa =

- Location within Romania

Location
- Country: Romania
- Counties: Bistrița-Năsăud County
- Villages: Gersa II, Gersa I, Rebrișoara

Physical characteristics
- Source: Rodna Mountains
- Mouth: Someșul Mare
  - location: Rebrișoara
  - coordinates: 47.2817°N 24.4374°E
- Length: 21 km (13 mi)
- Basin size: 66 km^{2} (25 sq mi)

Basin features
- Progression: Someșul Mare→ Someș→ Tisza→ Danube→ Black Sea

The Gersa is a right tributary of the river Someșul Mare in Romania. It discharges into the Someșul Mare in Rebrișoara. Its length is 21 km (13 mi) and its basin size is 66 km^{2} (25 sq mi).
