= Anieș =

- Location within Romania

Location
- Country: Romania
- Counties: Bistrița-Năsăud County

Physical characteristics
- Mouth: Someșul Mare
  - location: Anieș
  - coordinates: 47°24′44″N 24°46′08″E
  - elevation: 489 m (1,604 ft)
- Length: 20 km (12 mi)
- Basin size: 136 km^{2} (53 sq mi)

Basin features
- Progression: Someșul Mare→ Someș→ Tisza→ Danube→ Black Sea
- Tributaries
  - right: Izvorul Mare, Anieșul Mic

The Anieș (Hungarian: Anyes-patak) is a right tributary of the river Someșul Mare in Romania. Upstream from its confluence with the Anieșul Mic, it is also referred to as Anieșul Mare. It discharges into the Someșul Mare in the village Anieș. Its length is 20 km (12 mi) and its basin size is 136 km^{2} (53 sq mi).
