= Gârbăul Dejului =

- Location within Romania

Location
- Country: Romania
- Counties: Cluj County
- Villages: Gârbău Dejului, Valea Gârboului

Physical characteristics
- Mouth: Someșul Mare
  - location: Mănășturel
  - coordinates: 47.1576°N 23.9353°E
- Length: 10 km (6.2 mi)
- Basin size: 19 km^{2} (7.3 sq mi)

Basin features
- Progression: Someșul Mare→ Someș→ Tisza→ Danube→ Black Sea

The Gârbăul Dejului is a right tributary of the river Someșul Mare in Romania. It discharges into the Someșul Mare in Mănășturel near Dej. Its length is 10 km (6.2 mi) and its basin size is 19 km^{2} (7.3 sq mi).
