= Valea lui Dan =

- Location within Romania

Location
- Country: Romania
- Counties: Bistrița-Năsăud County
- Villages: Feldru

Physical characteristics
- Source: Rodna Mountains
- Mouth: Someșul Mare
  - location: Feldru
  - coordinates: 47.2796°N 24.5826°E
- Length: 13 km (8.1 mi)
- Basin size: 19 km^{2} (7.3 sq mi)

Basin features
- Progression: Someșul Mare→ Someș→ Tisza→ Danube→ Black Sea

The Valea lui Dan is a right tributary of the river Someșul Mare in Romania. It discharges into the Someșul Mare near Feldru. Its length is 13 km (8.1 mi) and its basin size is 19 km^{2} (7.3 sq mi).
