= Dacian fortress of Monor =

- Location within Romania
- 46.934°N 24.698°E
- Location: Cetate, Monor, Bistrița-Năsăud, Romania

Site notes
- Condition: Ruined

Monument istoric
- Reference no.: BN-I-s-B-01367

It was a Dacian fortified town.
