= Someșul Mare =

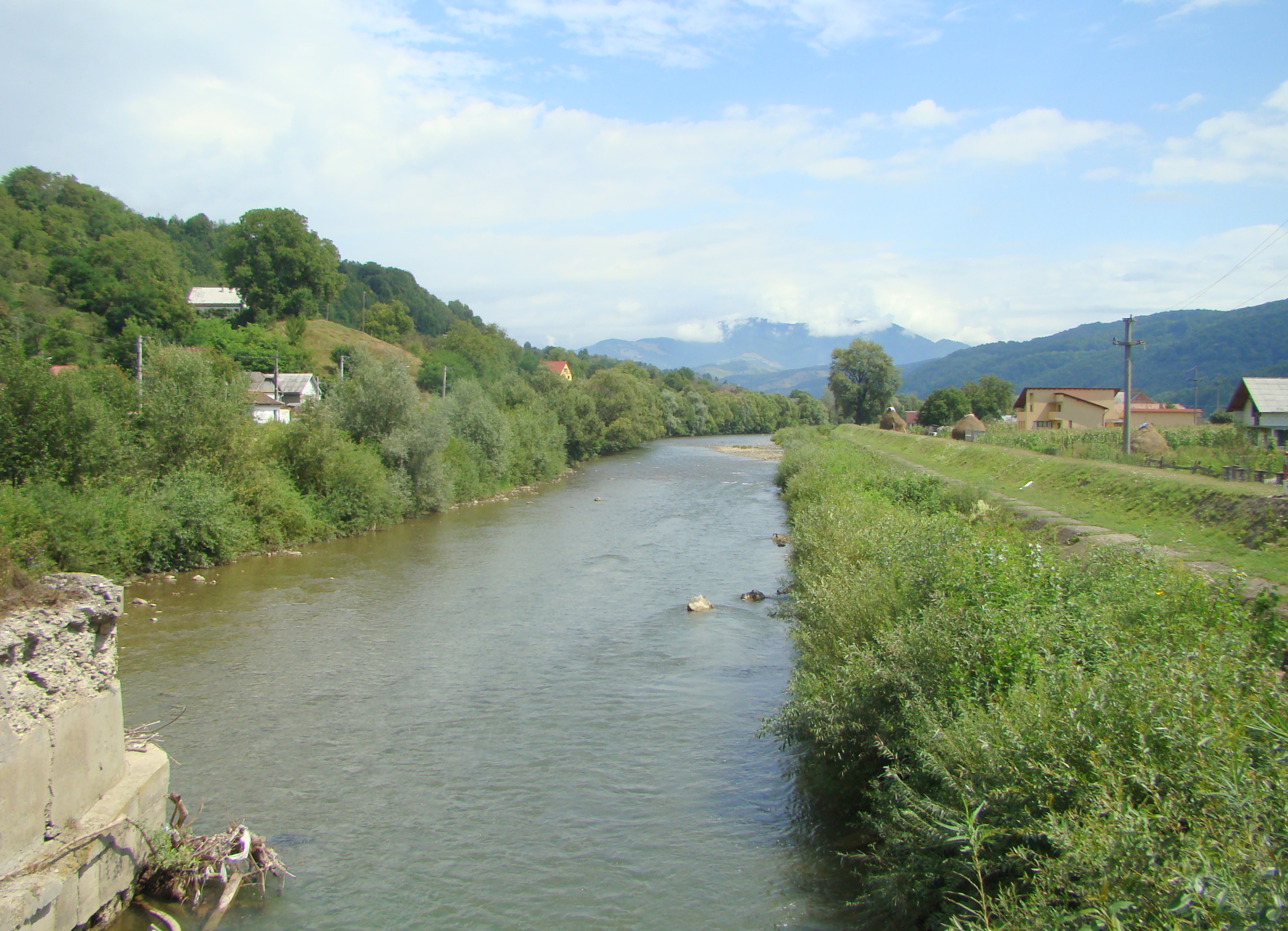

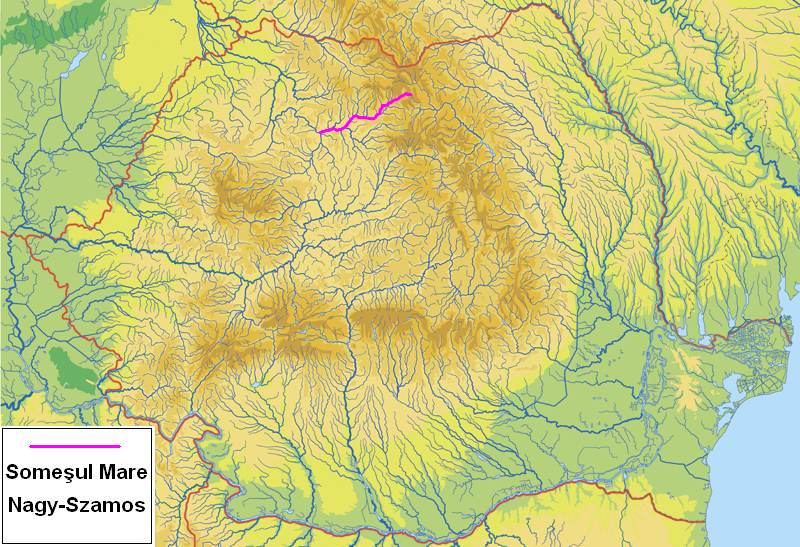

Location
- Country: Romania
- Counties: Bistrița-Năsăud, Cluj
- Towns: Sângeorz-Băi, Năsăud, Beclean

Physical characteristics
- Source: Rodna Mountains
- Mouth: Someș
  - location: Mica
  - coordinates: 47°8′41″N 23°54′48″E
- Length: 130 km (81 mi)
- Basin size: 5,033 km^{2} (1,943 sq mi)

Basin features
- Progression: Someș→ Tisza→ Danube→ Black Sea
- Tributaries
  - left: Șieu

The Someșul Mare (Great Someș, Hungarian: Nagy-Szamos) is a river in north-western Romania, originating in the Bistrița-Năsăud County in the Rodna Mountains at the confluence of two headwaters — the Preluci and the Zmeu. The Someșul Mare flows west through Rodna, Năsăud and Beclean, until it meets the Someșul Mic at Mica, upstream of Dej. Its length is 130 km (81 mi) and its basin size is 5,033 km^{2} (1,943 sq mi). Downstream from its confluence with the Someșul Mic, the river is called Someș.

== Towns and villages ==
The following towns and villages are situated along the river Someșul Mare, from source to mouth: Șanț, Rodna, Maieru, Sângeorz-Băi, Ilva Mică, Feldru, Nepos, Năsăud, Salva, Nimigea, Chiuza, Beclean, Petru Rareș, Mica.

== Tributaries ==
The following rivers are tributaries to the river Someșul Mare:

Left: Măria, Valea Mare, Cârțibavul Mare, Ilva, Târgul, Frâu, Valea Carelor, Bratoșa, Șieu, Meleș, Valea Viilor

Right: Gagi, Cobășel, Pârâul Băilor, Anieș, Maieru, Cormaia, Borcut, Feldrișel, Valea lui Dan, Rebra, Gersa, Valea Caselor, Valea Podului, Sălăuța, Runc, Țibleș, Între Hotare, Rituria, Ilișua, Valea Mare, Lelești, Gârbăul Dejului
