= Porkerec =

Porkerec is the Hungarian name for two villages in Romania:

- Purcărete village, Negrileşti Commune, Bistriţa-Năsăud County
- Purcăreţ village, Letca Commune, Sălaj County (Pórkerec)
