= Ciocan =

Ciocan is a Romanian surname, literally meaning 'hammer'. It can refer to:

- Constantin Ciocan (born 1943), Romanian cyclist
- Cristian Ciocan (born 1974), Romanian philosopher
- Ieremia Ciocan (born 1867–1941), Romanian priest and politician
- Ilie Ciocan (1913–2026), Romanian soldier and supercentenarian
- Ion Ciocan (1850–1915), Romanian politician and professor
- Iurie Ciocan (born 1971), Moldovan politician and professor
- Christian Hammer (né Cristian Ciocan, born 1987), Romanian-German professional boxer

== See also ==
- Ciocanu
- Ciocana, a sector in Chișinău
- Emil Cioran (1911–1995), Romanian philosopher, aphorist and essayist
