= Vasile Rus =

Romania international rugby union player

Vasile Sorin Rus
- Born: Vasile Sorin Rus; 21 October 1983 (age 43) Feldru (Bistrița-Năsăud), Romania
- Height: 6 ft 4 in (1.93 m)
- Weight: 17 st 2.3 lb (240.3 lb; 109.0 kg)

Rugby union career
- Position: Number 8
Senior career
Years	Team	Apps	(Points)
- RC Timişoara
International career
Years	Team	Apps	(Points)
2007–16	Romania	14	(5)
- Correct as of 12 November 2016

Vasile Sorin Rus (born 21 October 1983 in Feldru (Bistrița-Năsăud), Romania) is a retired Romanian rugby union footballer. He played as number eight.

He was formed as a player at the U Cluj rugby club. He won the Romanian Rugby Cup once while at U Cluj and was twice runner-up with CSA Steaua București. He was also runner-up with CSA Steaua București in the Romanian Rugby Championship and won the title of player of the year of 2009 in Romania. He is currently playing for RC Timişoara in the Romanian Rugby Championship.

He has 13 caps for Romania, since his first game at the 12–22 loss to Russia, in Bucharest, at 4 November 2007, for the Six Nations B, with 1 try scored, 5 points on aggregate. He missed the 2011 Rugby World Cup.
