= Bratoșa =

- Location within Romania

Location
- Country: Romania
- Counties: Bistrița-Năsăud County
- Villages: Mintiu, Florești

Physical characteristics
- Mouth: Someșul Mare
  - coordinates: 47.2267°N 24.2620°E
- Length: 13 km (8.1 mi)
- Basin size: 48 km^{2} (19 sq mi)

Basin features
- Progression: Someșul Mare→ Someș→ Tisza→ Danube→ Black Sea
- Tributaries
  - left: Tău

The Bratoșa (Hungarian: Bratósá) is a left tributary of the river Someșul Mare in Romania. It discharges into the Someșul Mare in Florești. Its length is 13 km (8.1 mi) and its basin size is 48 km^{2} (19 sq mi).
