= Ciceu-Giurgești =

- Commune
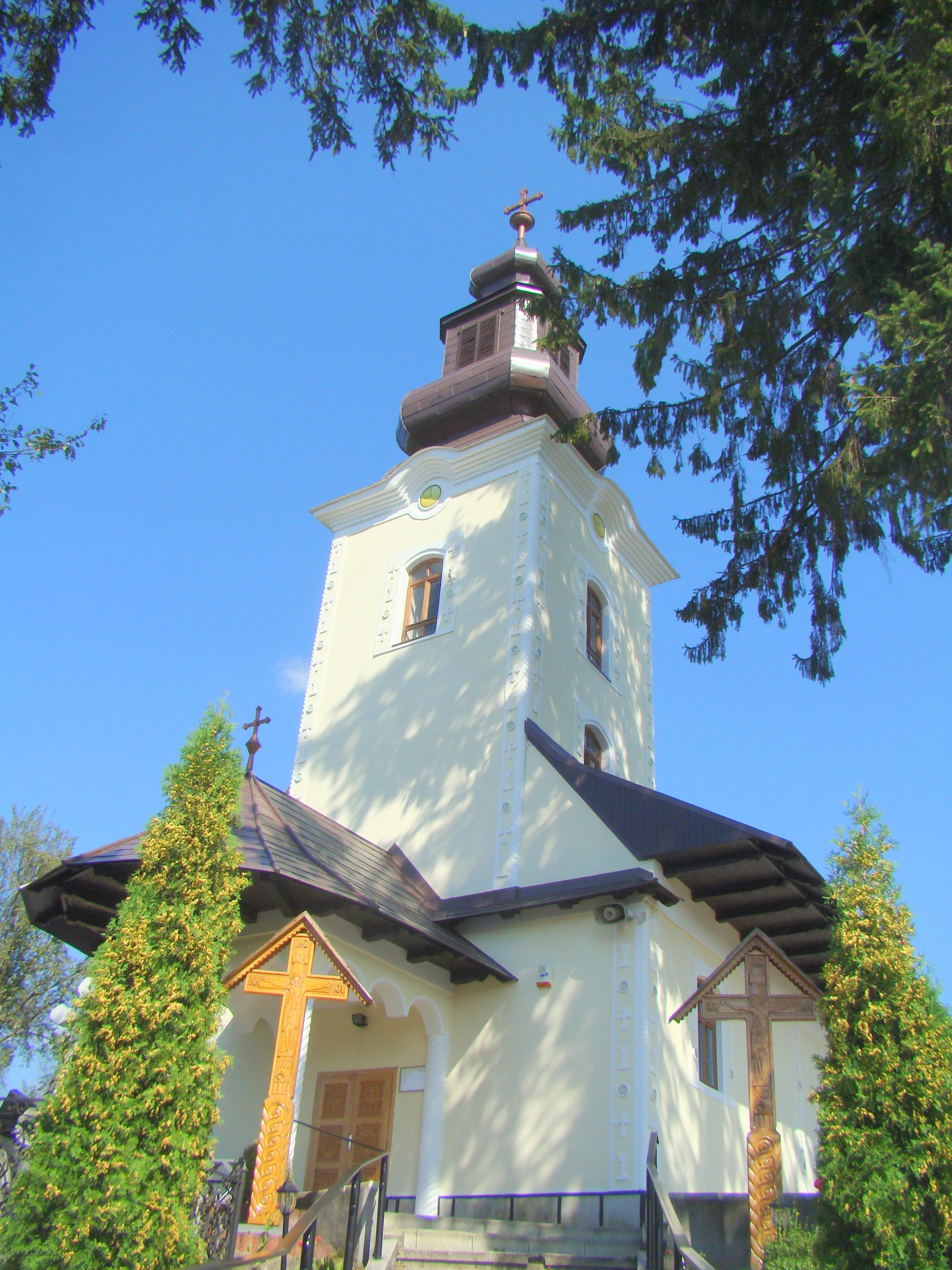
- Archangels' church in Ciceu-Giurgești village

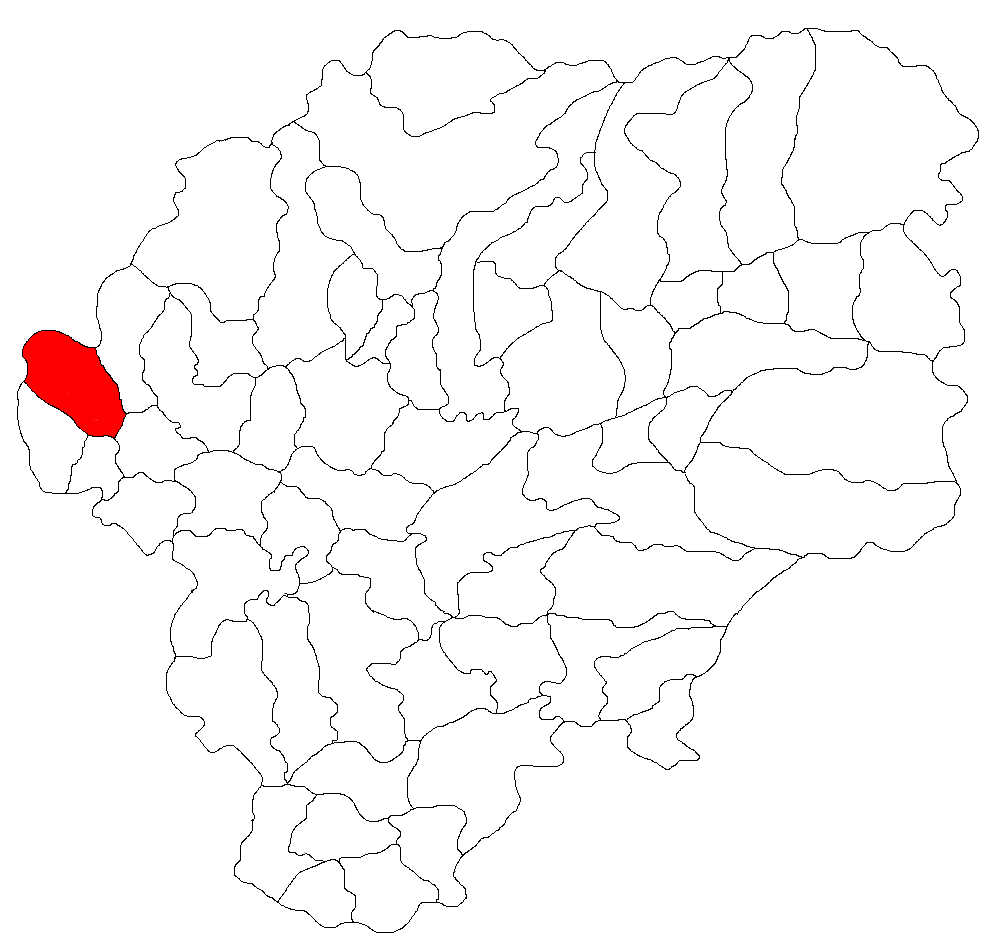
- Location in Bistrița-Năsăud County

- Location in Romania
- Coordinates: 47°15′N 24°1′E
- Country: Romania
- County: Bistrița-Năsăud

Government
  - Mayor (2020–2024): Vasile Iuga (PSD)
- Area: 53.01 km^{2} (20.47 sq mi)
- Elevation: 285 m (935 ft)
- Population (2021-12-01): 1,335
  - Density: 25.18/km^{2} (65.23/sq mi)
- Time zone: UTC+02:00 (EET)
  - Summer (DST): UTC+03:00 (EEST)
- Postal code: 427065
- Area code: +(40) 263
- Vehicle reg.: BN
- Website: www.primariaciceugiurgesti.ro

Ciceu-Giurgești (Hungarian: Csicsógyörgyfalva; German: Gergesdorf) is a commune in Bistrița-Năsăud County, Transylvania, Romania. It is composed of two villages, Ciceu-Giurgești and Dumbrăveni (Gáncs). It also included three other villages until 2002, when they were split off to form Negrilești Commune.

== Geography ==
The commune is located in the eastern part of the county, on the border with Cluj County. It lies on the banks of the river Valea Mare.

== Demographics ==
At the 2021 census, the commune had a population of 1,335, of which 91.46% were Romanians and 3.6% Roma.

== Gallery ==
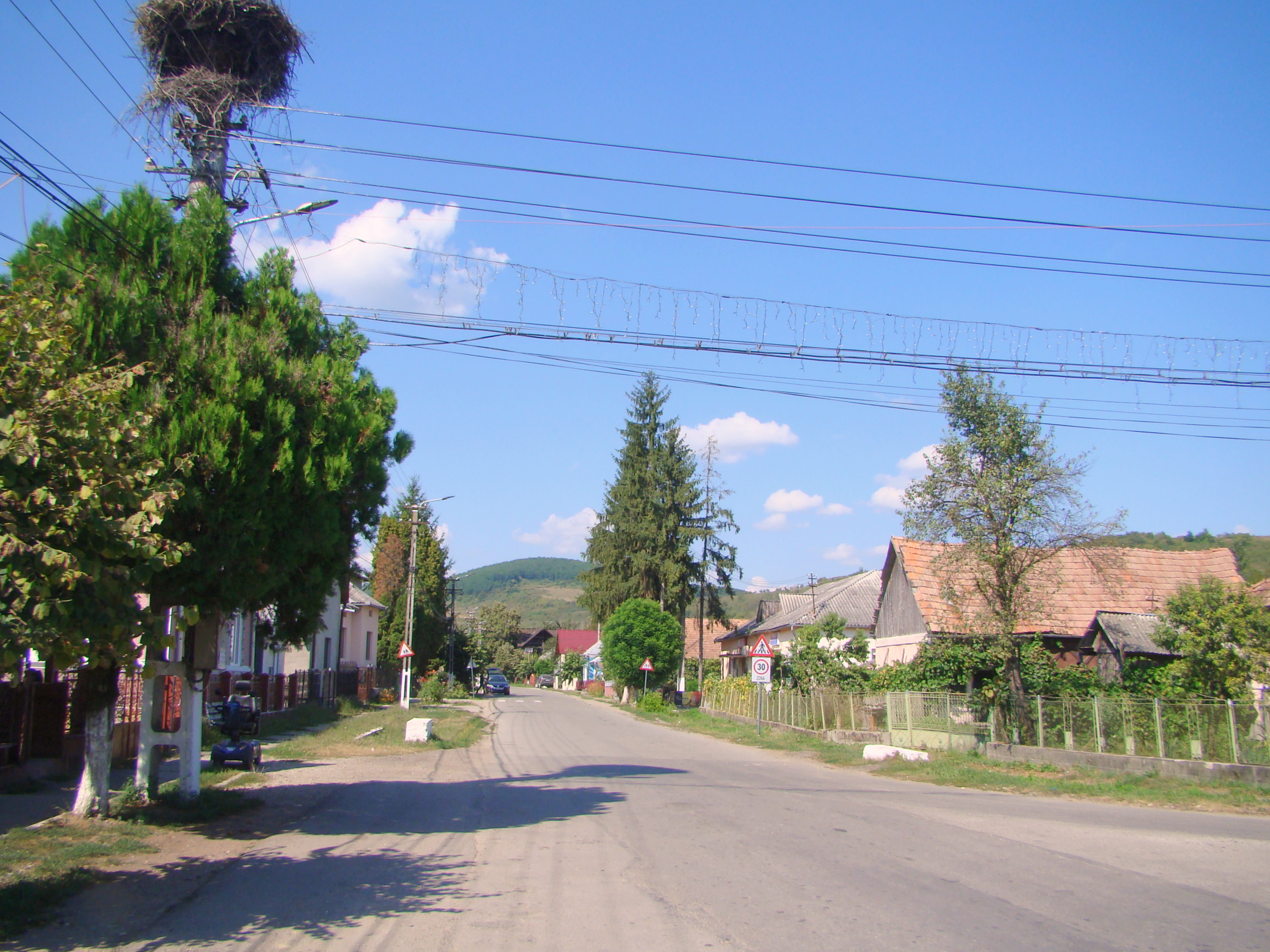
Ciceu-Giurgești village

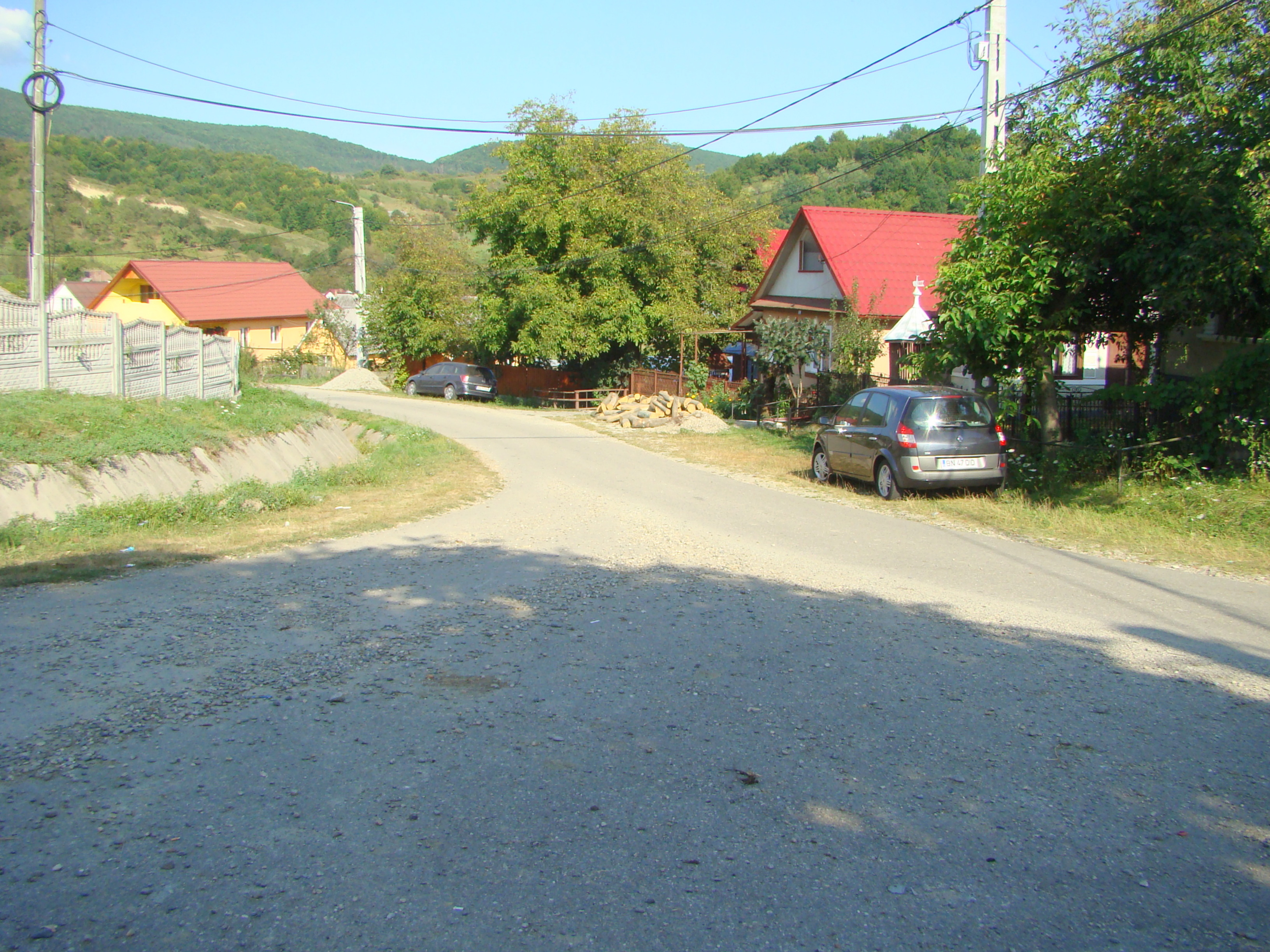
Dumbrăveni village

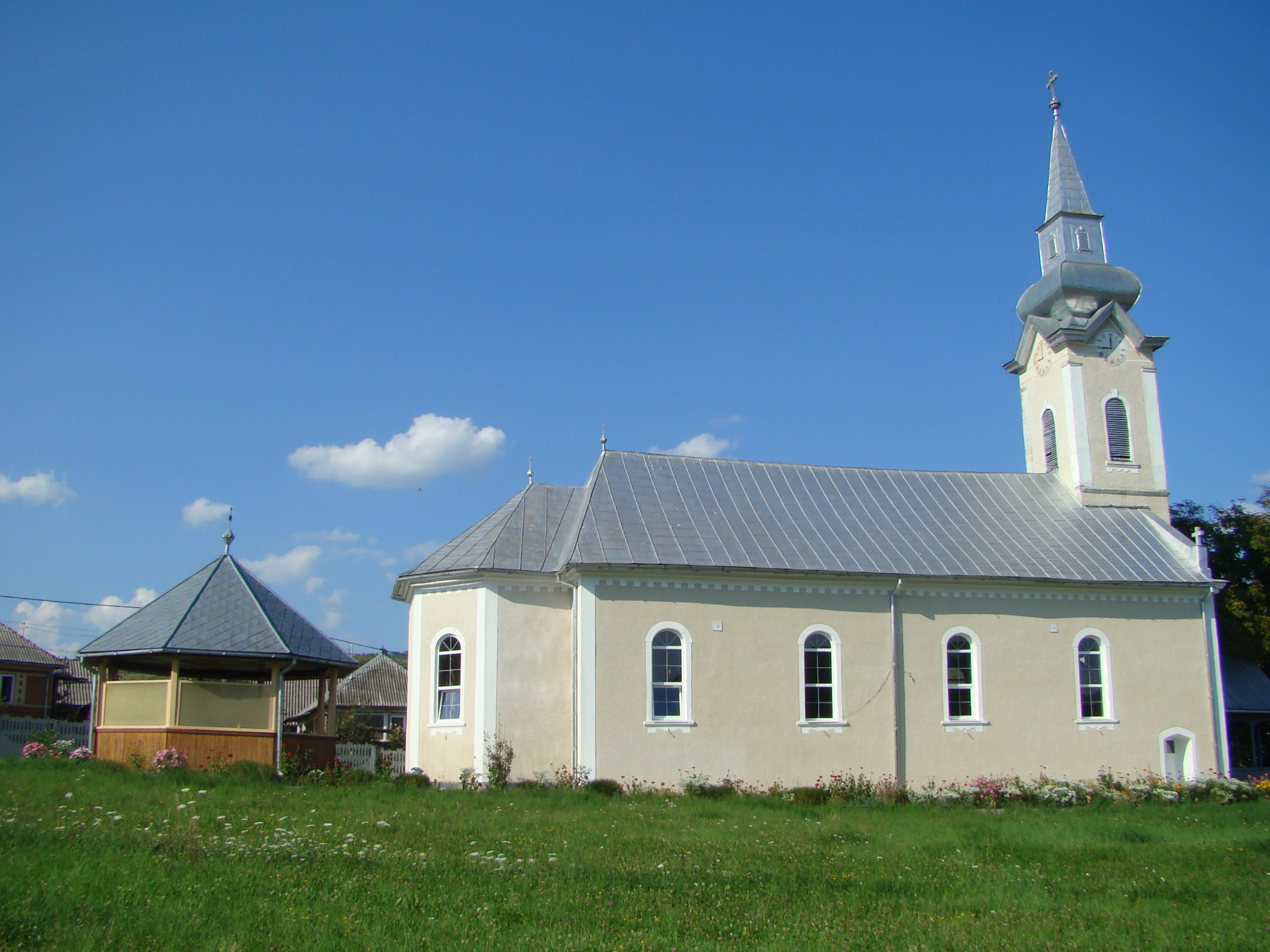
Archangels' church in Dumbrăveni village
