= Rebra =

- Commune
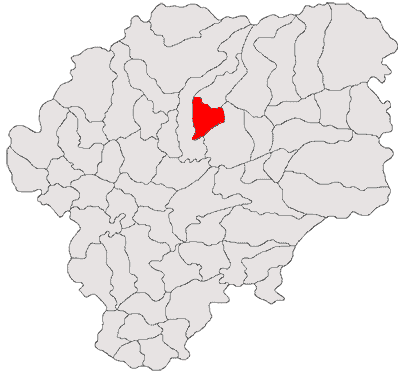
- Location in Bistrița-Năsăud County

- Location in Romania
- Coordinates: 47°19′N 24°30′E
- Country: Romania
- County: Bistrița-Năsăud

Government
  - Mayor (2020–2024): Ștefan Danci (PSD)
- Area: 45.81 km^{2} (17.69 sq mi)
- Elevation: 383 m (1,257 ft)
- Population (2021-12-01): 2,785
  - Density: 61/km^{2} (160/sq mi)
- Time zone: EET/EEST (UTC+2/+3)
- Postal code: 427235
- Area code: +40 263
- Vehicle reg.: BN
- Website: www.primariarebra.ro

Rebra (Hungarian: Nagyrebra) is a commune in Bistrița-Năsăud County, Transylvania, Romania. It is composed of a single village, Rebra. The river Rebra passes through the commune.
