= Parva, Bistrița-Năsăud =

Parva
- Commune
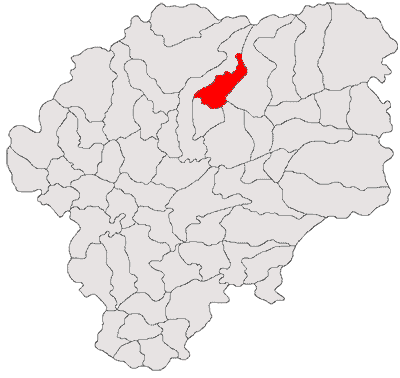
- Location in Bistrița-Năsăud County

- Location in Romania
- Coordinates: 47°24′N 24°33′E
- Country: Romania
- County: Bistrița-Năsăud

Government
  - Mayor (2020–2024): Ioan Strugari (PSD)
- Area: 70.65 km^{2} (27.28 sq mi)
- Elevation: 530 m (1,740 ft)
- Population (2021-12-01): 2,476
  - Density: 35/km^{2} (91/sq mi)
- Time zone: EET/EEST (UTC+2/+3)
- Postal code: 427210
- Area code: +(40) x59
- Vehicle reg.: BN
- Website: www.primariaparva.ro

Parva (Hungarian: Párva) is a commune in Bistrița-Năsăud County, Transylvania, Romania. It is composed of a single village, Parva.

The commune is situated at the northern edge of the Transylvanian Plateau, at an altitude of 530 m (1,740 ft), on the banks of the river Rebra.
