= Miceștii de Câmpie =

Miceștii de Câmpie Mezőkecsed
- Commune
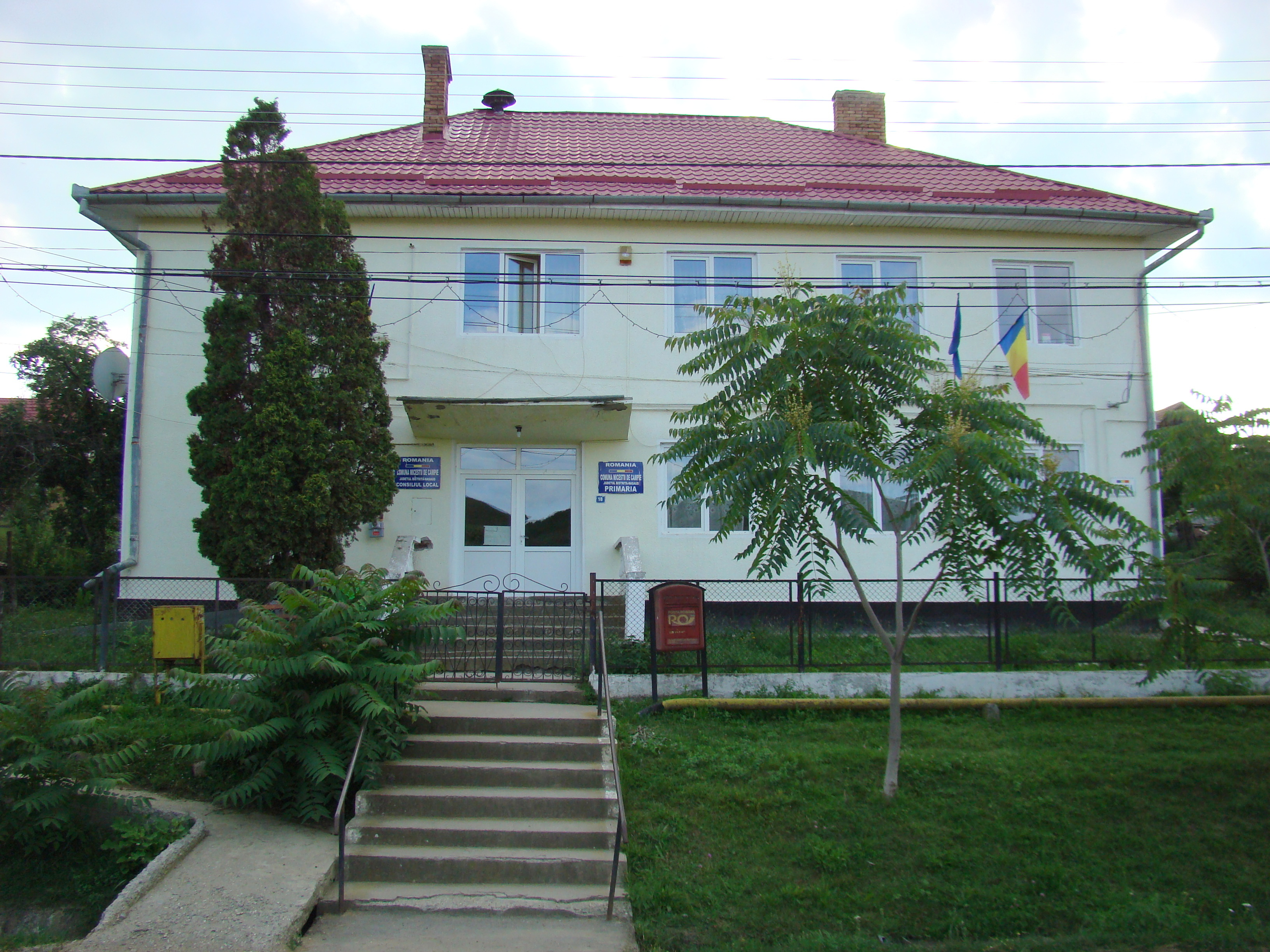
- Miceștii de Câmpie town hall

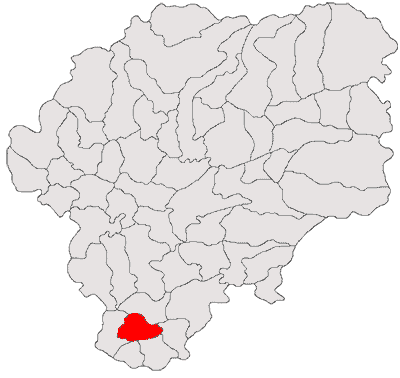
- Location in Bistrița-Năsăud County

- Location in Romania
- Coordinates: 46°52′N 24°19′E
- Country: Romania
- County: Bistrița-Năsăud

Government
  - Mayor (2020–2024): Ioan Becan (PNL)
- Area: 42.73 km^{2} (16.50 sq mi)
- Elevation: 356 m (1,168 ft)
- Population (2021-12-01): 915
  - Density: 21.4/km^{2} (55.5/sq mi)
- Time zone: UTC+02:00 (EET)
  - Summer (DST): UTC+03:00 (EEST)
- Postal code: 427160
- Area code: +(40) x59
- Vehicle reg.: BN
- Website: micestiidecampie.ro

Miceștii de Câmpie (Hungarian: Mezőkecsed) is a commune in Bistrița-Năsăud County, Transylvania, Romania. It is composed of three villages: Fântânița (Mezőköbölkút), Miceștii de Câmpie, and Visuia (Mezőviszolya).

At the 2021 census, the commune had 915 inhabitants; of those, 70.27% were Romanians, 21.09% Hungarians, and 3.17% Roma.
