= Ciocanu =

Ciocanu is a Romanian proper name. It can refer to:

Places

- Ciocanu, a village in Dâmbovicioara Commune, Argeș County, Romania
- Ciocanu Monastery, a monastery in Bughea de Jos Commune, Argeș County, Romania

People

- Anatol Ciocanu (1940–2012), Moldovan and Romanian poet and publicist
- Ion Ciocanu (1940–2021), Moldovan and Romanian literary critic, philologist, pedagogue and writer
- Vasile Ciocanu (1942–2003), Romanian literary historian and philologist

== See also ==
- Ciocan
