= Chiuza =

- Commune
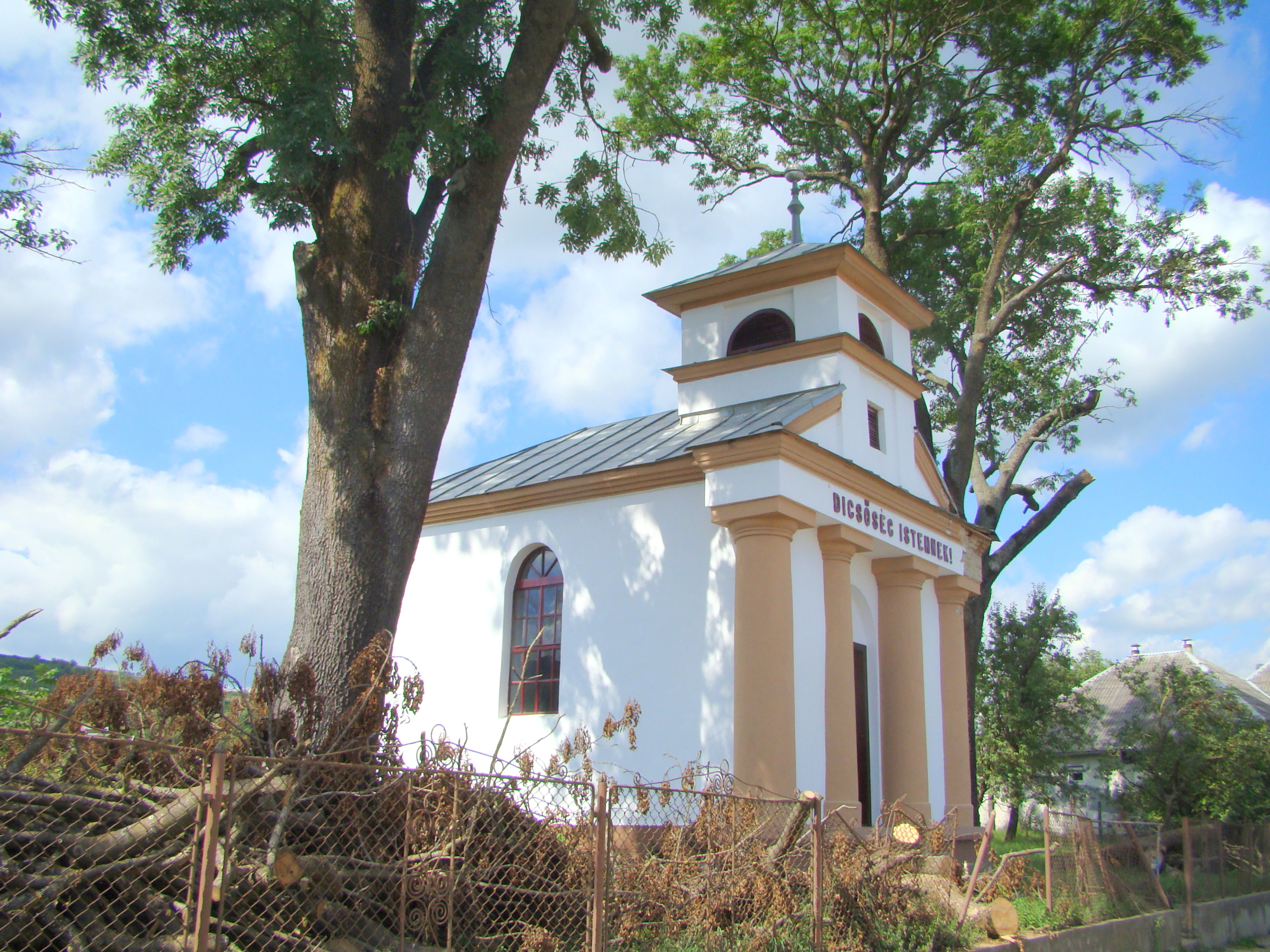
- Reformed church in Săsarm

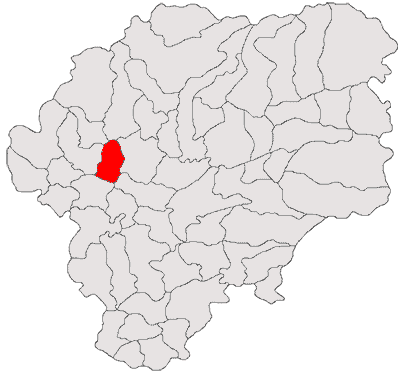
- Location in Bistrița-Năsăud County

- Location in Romania
- Coordinates: 47°14′N 24°15′E
- Country: Romania
- County: Bistrița-Năsăud

Government
  - Mayor (2020–2024): Grigore Bradea (PSD)
- Area: 44.21 km^{2} (17.07 sq mi)
- Elevation: 277 m (909 ft)
- Population (2021-12-01): 2,067
  - Density: 46.75/km^{2} (121.1/sq mi)
- Time zone: UTC+02:00 (EET)
  - Summer (DST): UTC+03:00 (EEST)
- Postal code: 427060
- Area code: +(40) x59
- Vehicle reg.: BN
- Website: chiuza.ro

Chiuza (Hungarian: Középfalva or Középfalu; German: Mitteldorf) is a commune in Bistrița-Năsăud County, Transylvania, Romania. It is composed of four villages: Chiuza, Mireș (Diófás), Piatra (Kőfarka), and Săsarm (Szészárma; German: Weisshorn).

The commune is situated on the Transylvanian Plateau, at an altitude of 277 m (909 ft), on the banks of the Someșul Mare River.

According to statistics from 1760–1762, Piatra village had 58 families, three priests, and a church. At the 2021 census, Chiuza commune had a population of 2,067; of those, 93.95% were Romanians and 1.06% Roma.
