= Monor, Bistrița-Năsăud =

Monor
- Commune
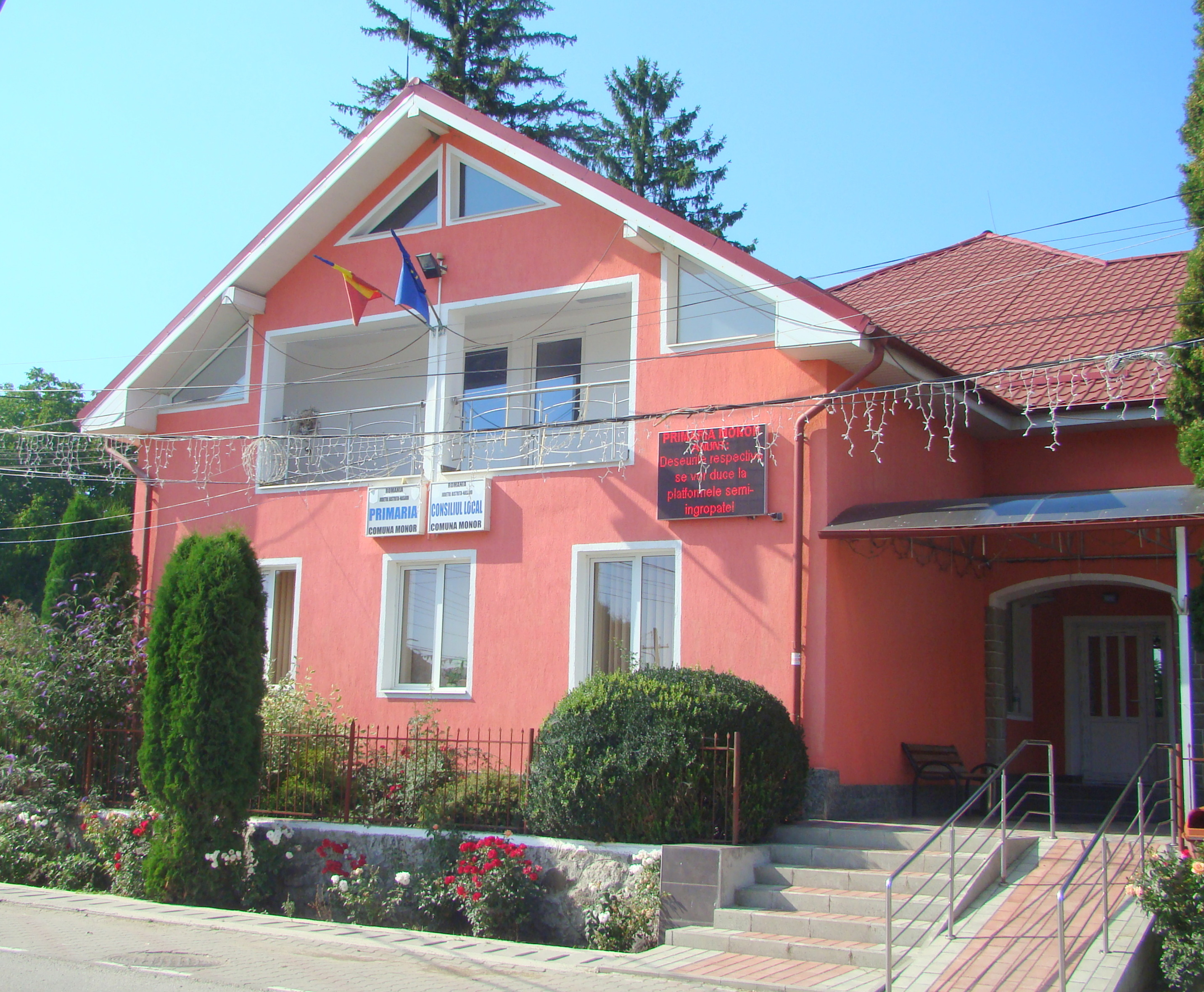
- Monor town hall

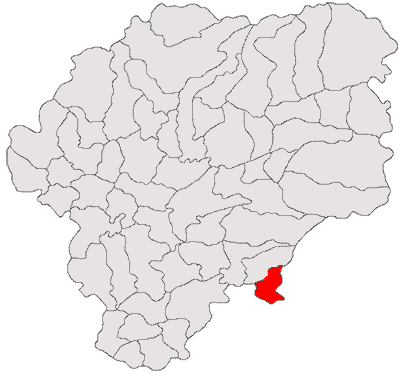
- Location in Bistrița-Năsăud County

- Location in Romania
- Coordinates: 46°58′N 24°42′E
- Country: Romania
- County: Bistrița-Năsăud

Government
  - Mayor (2020–2024): Ioan Cira (PSD)
- Area: 52.98 km^{2} (20.46 sq mi)
- Elevation: 453 m (1,486 ft)
- Population (2021-12-01): 1,231
  - Density: 23.24/km^{2} (60.18/sq mi)
- Time zone: UTC+02:00 (EET)
  - Summer (DST): UTC+03:00 (EEST)
- Postal code: 427175
- Vehicle reg.: BN
- Website: www.comunamonor.ro

Monor (Hungarian: Monorfalva; German: Mindendorf or Mindorf) is a commune in Bistrița-Năsăud County, Transylvania, Romania. It is composed of two villages, Gledin (Hungarian: Gledény; German: Gladein) and Monor.

The commune is situated on the Transylvanian Plateau, at an altitude of 453 m (1,486 ft). It is located in the southern part of the county, 31 km (19 mi) southeast of the county seat, Bistrița, on the border with Mureș County.

Monor is crossed by county road DJ154, which starts in Bistrița and ends in Reghin. The route of the Via Transilvanica long-distance trail passes through both villages.

== See also ==
- Dacian fortress of Monor
