= Ion Ciocan =

Austro-Hungarian politician and academic

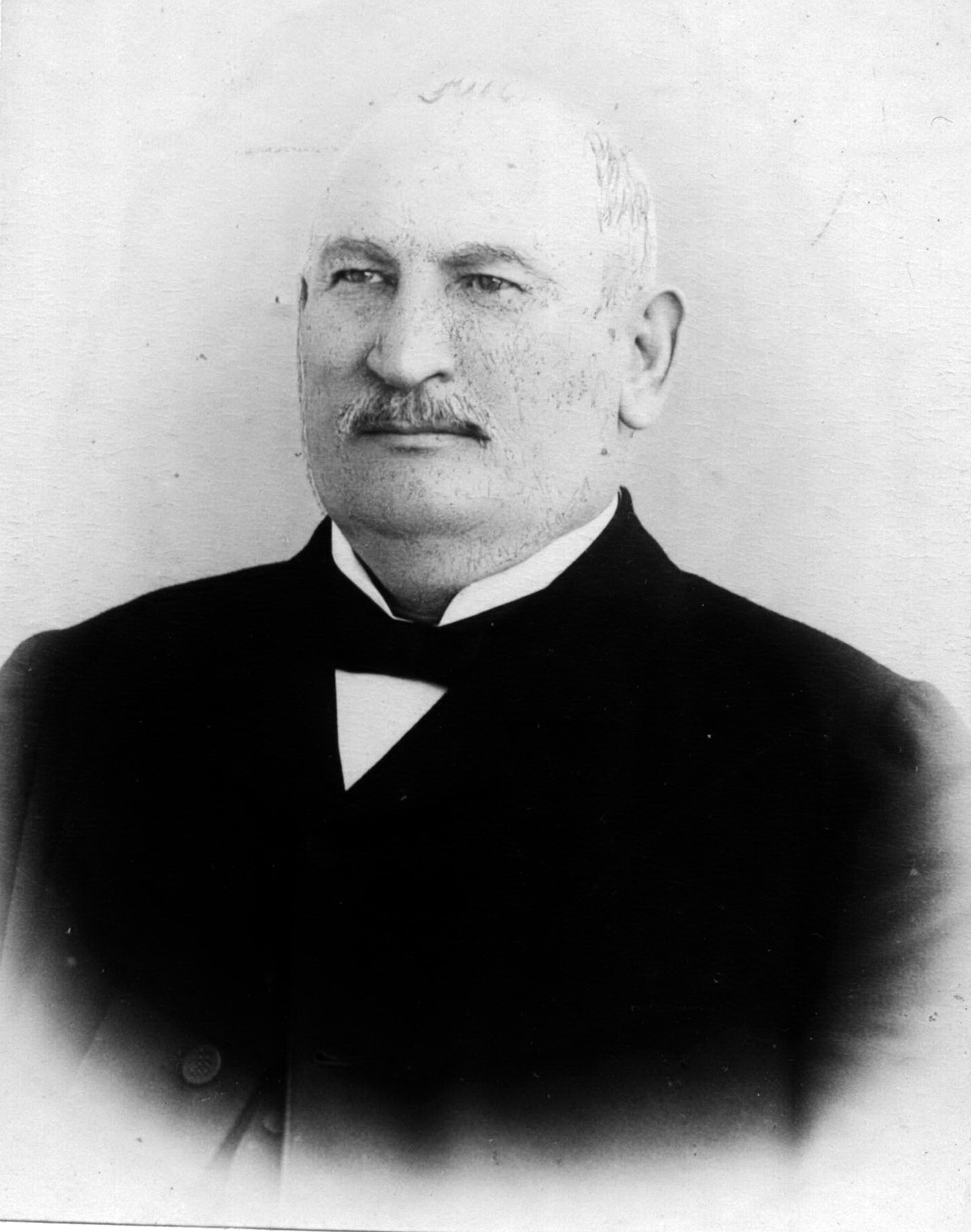
- Born: February 19, 1850; Mocod
- Died: September 6, 1915 (aged 65); Budapest
- Education: University of Budapest
- Employer: University of Budapest
- Spouse: Amalia Piciu
- Parent: Andrei Ciocan
- Awards: Order of Franz Joseph

Ion Ciocan (born February 19, 1850, Mocod – September 6, 1915, Budapest) was a Romanian politician and professor from Austro-Hungary. He served as member of the Parliament of Hungary (1896–1901, 1903–1915).

== Biography ==
Ion Ciocan was born on February 19, 1850, Mocod, then in the Austrian Empire. He graduated from the University of Budapest in 1874. He worked for Albina in Budapest (1874–1878) and after 1878 for a school from Năsăud. In 1886 became the president of the Fondurile şcolare năsăudene. He was a member of the Parliament of Hungary (1896–1901, 1903–1915). He also taught Romanian language at the University of Budapest (1898–1909).

== Awards ==
- He received the cross of the Knights of the Order of Franz Joseph, 1890

== Bibliography ==
- Gavrilă Tomi, „Ion Ciocan. La 90 de ani de la trecerea sa în nefiinţă” în Arhiva Someşană, nr.4/2005
- Ioan Păcurariu, „Ion Ciocan. Viaţa, caracteristica, moartea şi funerariile lui”, în Raportul al LIII-lea despre gimnaziul superior fundaţional din Naszód-Năsăud pentru annul şcolar 1915–1916, publicat de: Ioan Gheţie, director gimnazial
- Katalin Kese, „Istoricul catedrei de Filologie română din Budapesta” in Tribuna, nr 17/1995
