= Feldru =

- Commune
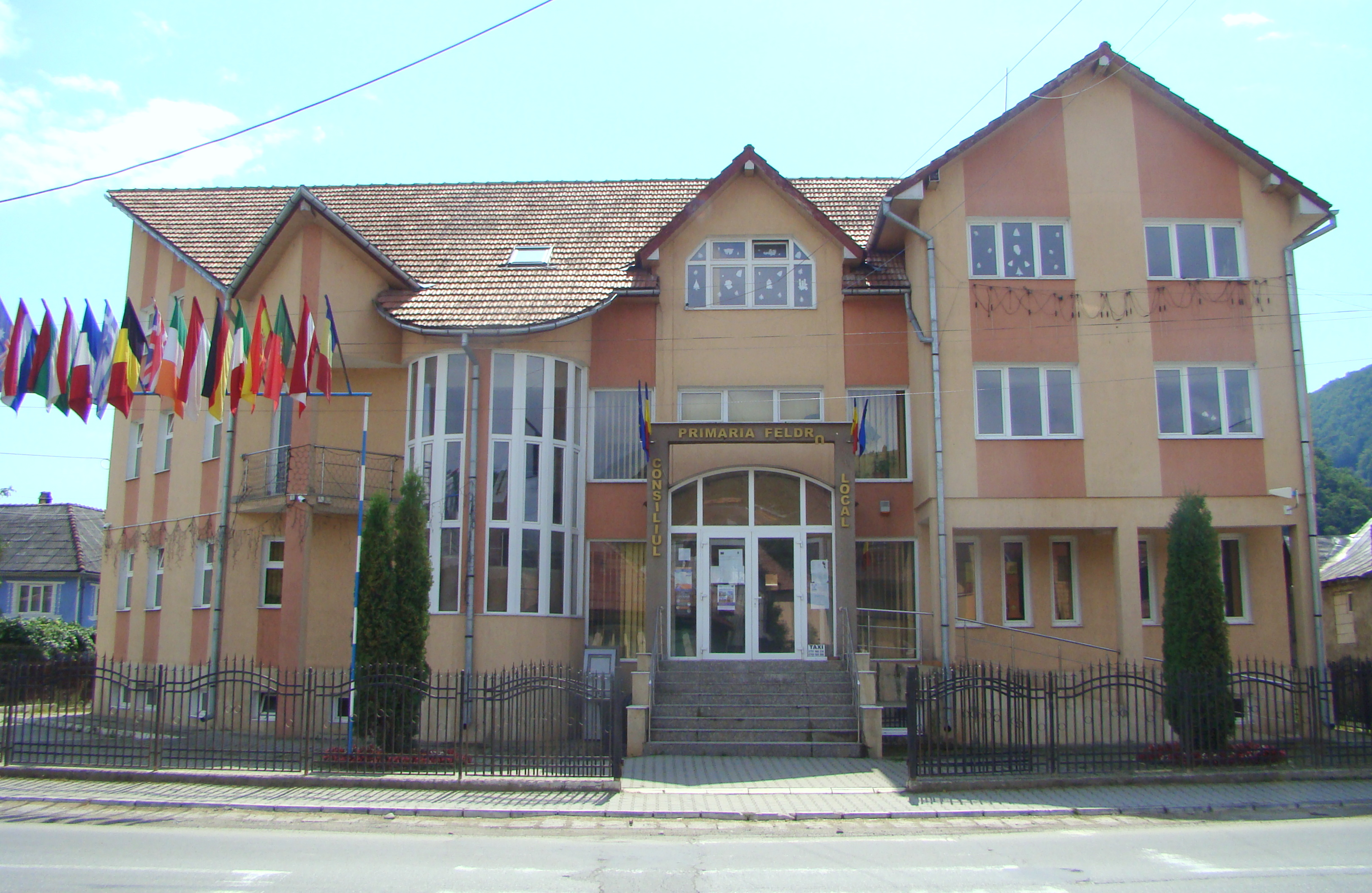
- Feldru town hall

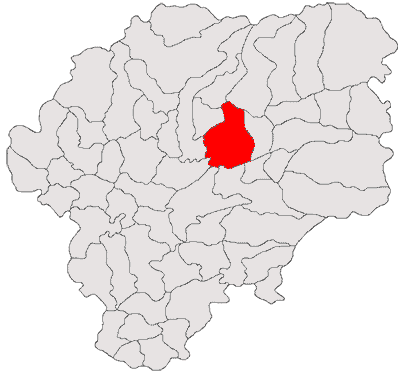
- Location in Bistrița-Năsăud County

- Location in Romania
- Coordinates: 47°17′N 24°36′E
- Country: Romania
- County: Bistrița-Năsăud

Government
  - Mayor (2020–2024): Grigore Țiolan (PNL)
- Area: 119.75 km^{2} (46.24 sq mi)
- Elevation: 380 m (1,250 ft)
- Population (2021-12-01): 7,378
  - Density: 61.61/km^{2} (159.6/sq mi)
- Time zone: UTC+02:00 (EET)
  - Summer (DST): UTC+03:00 (EEST)
- Postal code: 427080
- Area code: (+40) 02 63
- Vehicle reg.: BN
- Website: feldru.ro

Feldru (formerly Feldra; Hungarian: Földra; German: Felden, Felddorf, Birkenau, Waltersdorf) is a commune in Bistrița-Năsăud County, Transylvania, Romania. It is composed of two villages, Feldru and Nepos (colloquially Vărarea; Hungarian: Várorja; German: Werare).

The commune is located in the central part of the county, 36 km (22 mi) north of the county seat, Bistrița. It lies on the banks of the Someșul Mare River and its right tributary, Valea lui Dan, and it is crossed by the national road DN17D.

== Natives ==
- Vasile Nașcu (1816–1867), schoolteacher
- Vasile Rus (born 1983), rugby union player
