= Cuzdrioara =

- Commune
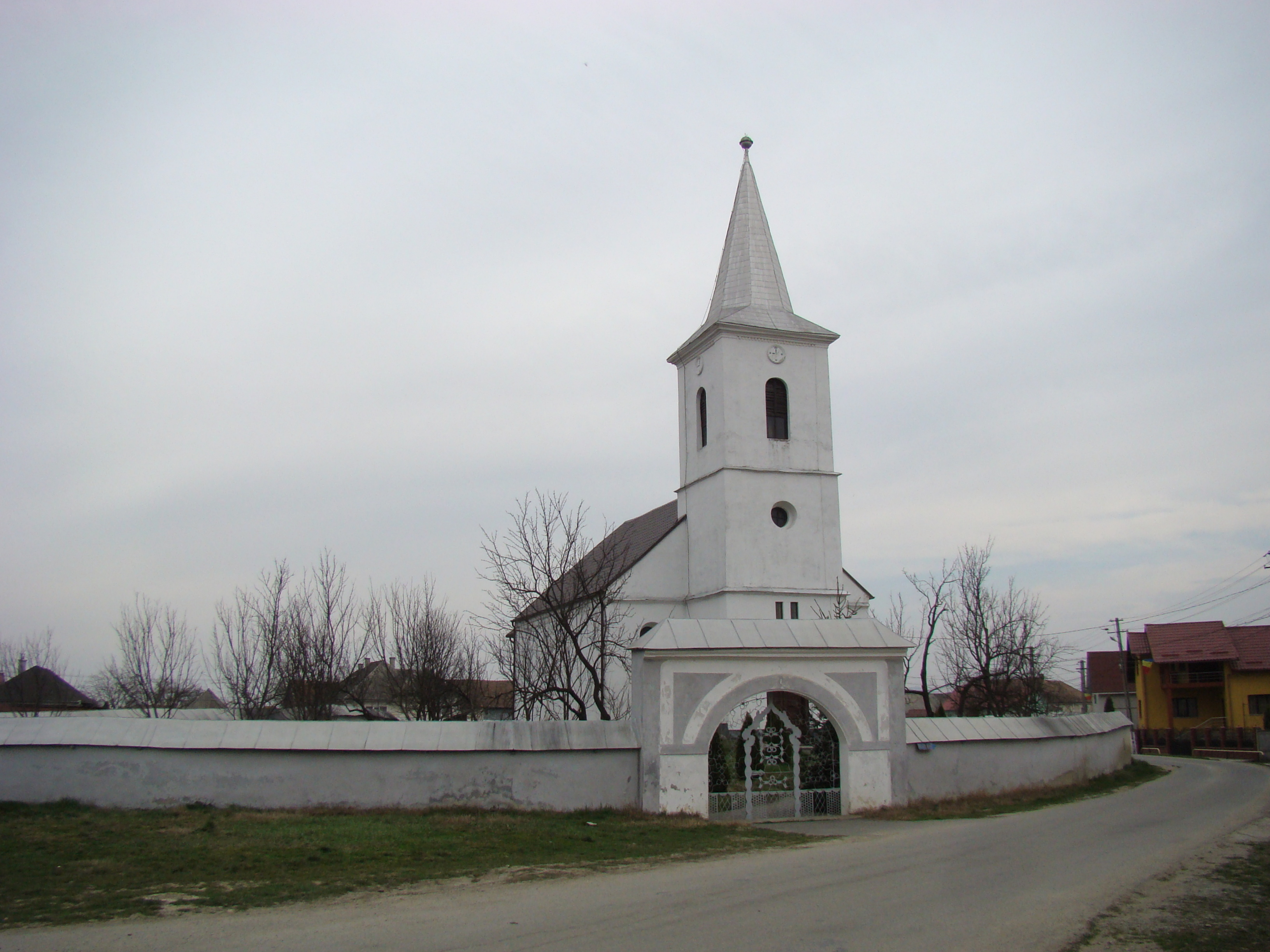
- Reformed church in Cuzdrioara (15th century)

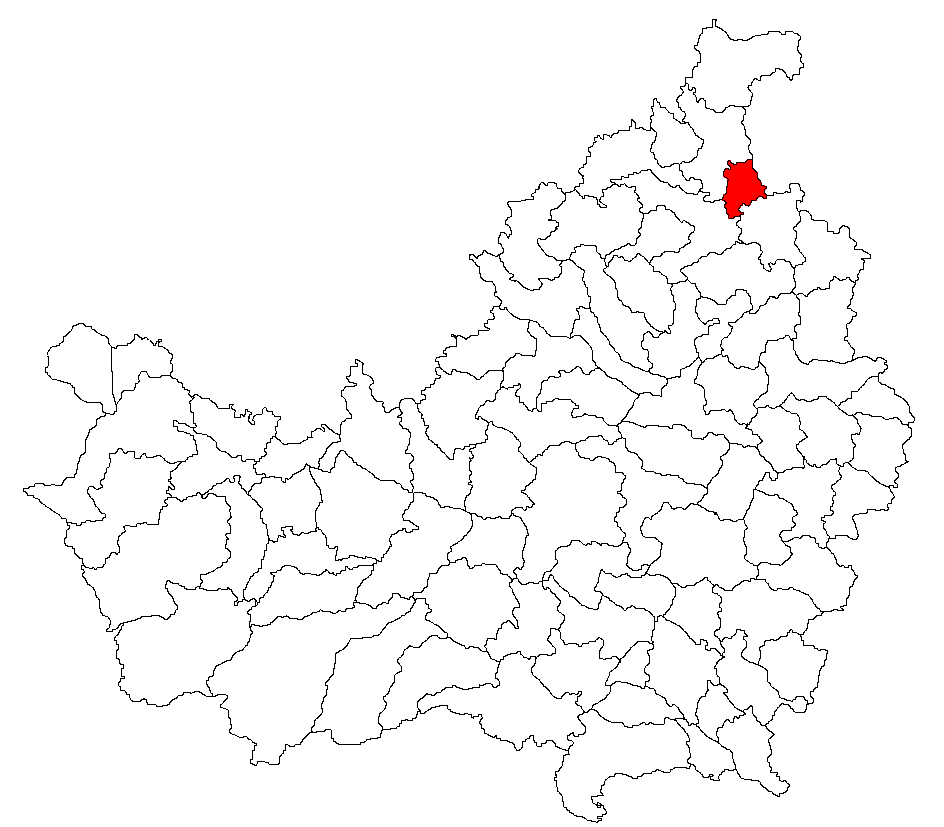
- Location in Cluj County

- Location in Romania
- Coordinates: 47°10′N 23°54′E
- Country: Romania
- County: Cluj
- Established: 1234
- Subdivisions: Cuzdrioara, Mănășturel, Valea Gârboului

Government
  - Mayor (2020–2024): Simion-Casian Rus (PNL)
- Area: 23.98 km^{2} (9.26 sq mi)
- Elevation: 342 m (1,122 ft)
- Population (2021-12-01): 3,001
  - Density: 125.1/km^{2} (324.1/sq mi)
- Time zone: UTC+02:00 (EET)
  - Summer (DST): UTC+03:00 (EEST)
- Postal code: 407260
- Area code: +(40) x64
- Vehicle reg.: CJ
- Website: www.primaria-cuzdrioara.ro

Cuzdrioara (Hungarian: Kozárvár; German: Altenburg/Kutzerwaar) is a commune in Cluj County, Transylvania, Romania. It is composed of three villages: Cuzdrioara, Mănășturel (Kismonostorszeg), and Valea Gârboului (Gorbóvölgye).

== Demographics ==
Historical population
Year	Pop.	±%
1850	1,448	—
1880	1,504	+3.9%
1890	1,705	+13.4%
1900	2,073	+21.6%
1910	2,163	+4.3%
1920	2,237	+3.4%
1930	2,564	+14.6%
1941	2,735	+6.7%
1956	2,891	+5.7%
1966	3,167	+9.5%
1977	3,305	+4.4%
1992	2,861	−13.4%
2002	2,975	+4.0%
2011	2,733	−8.1%
2021	3,001	+9.8%
Source: Census data

According to the census from 2002 there was a total population of 2,975 people living in this commune; of this population, 82.38% were ethnic Romanians, 11.36% ethnic Roma, and 6.18% ethnic Hungarians. At the 2021 census, Cuzdrioara had a population of 3,001, of which 80.71% were Romanians, 10.9% Roma, and 2.43% Hungarians.

== Notes ==
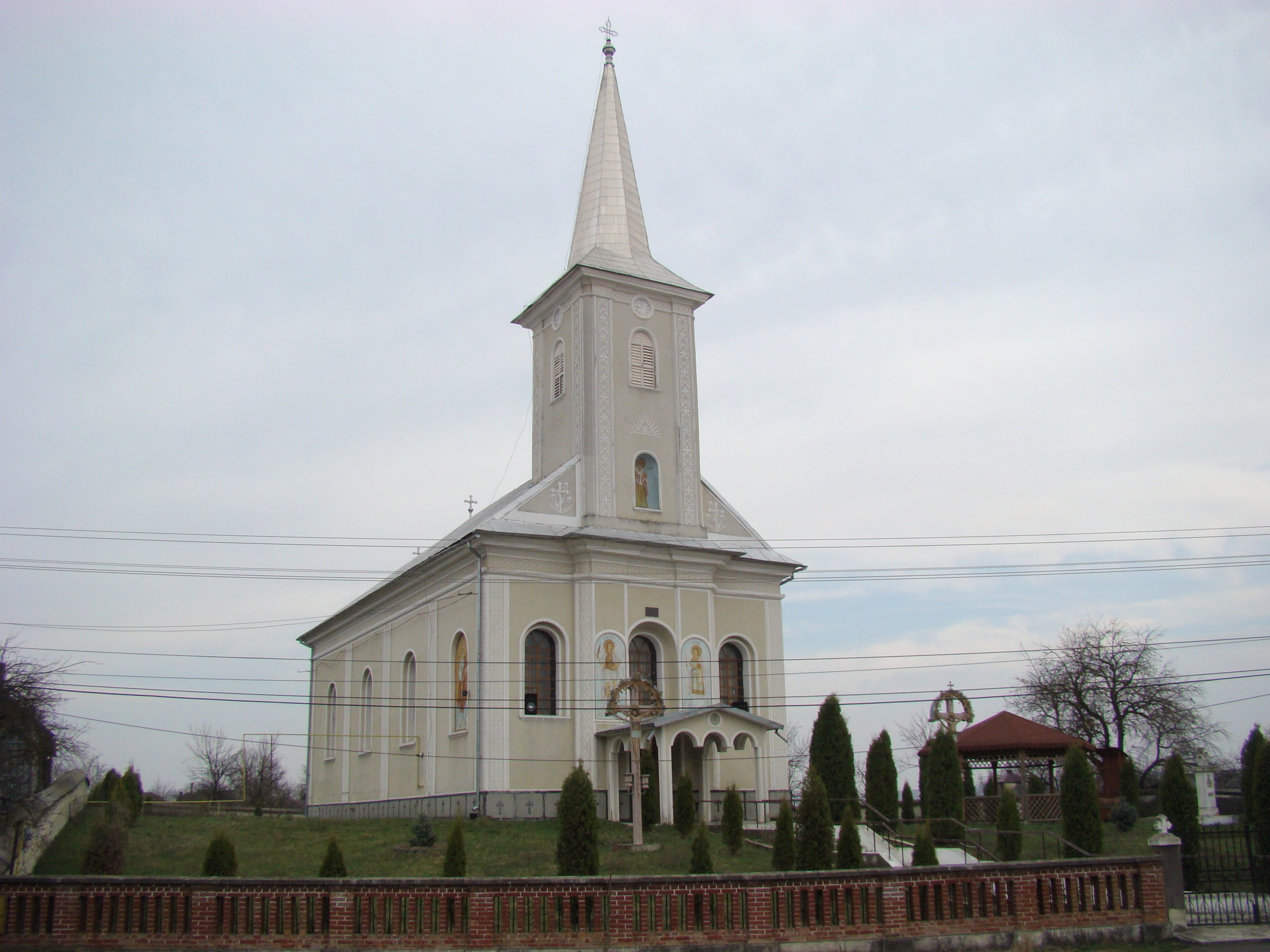
Orthodox church of Cuzdrioara

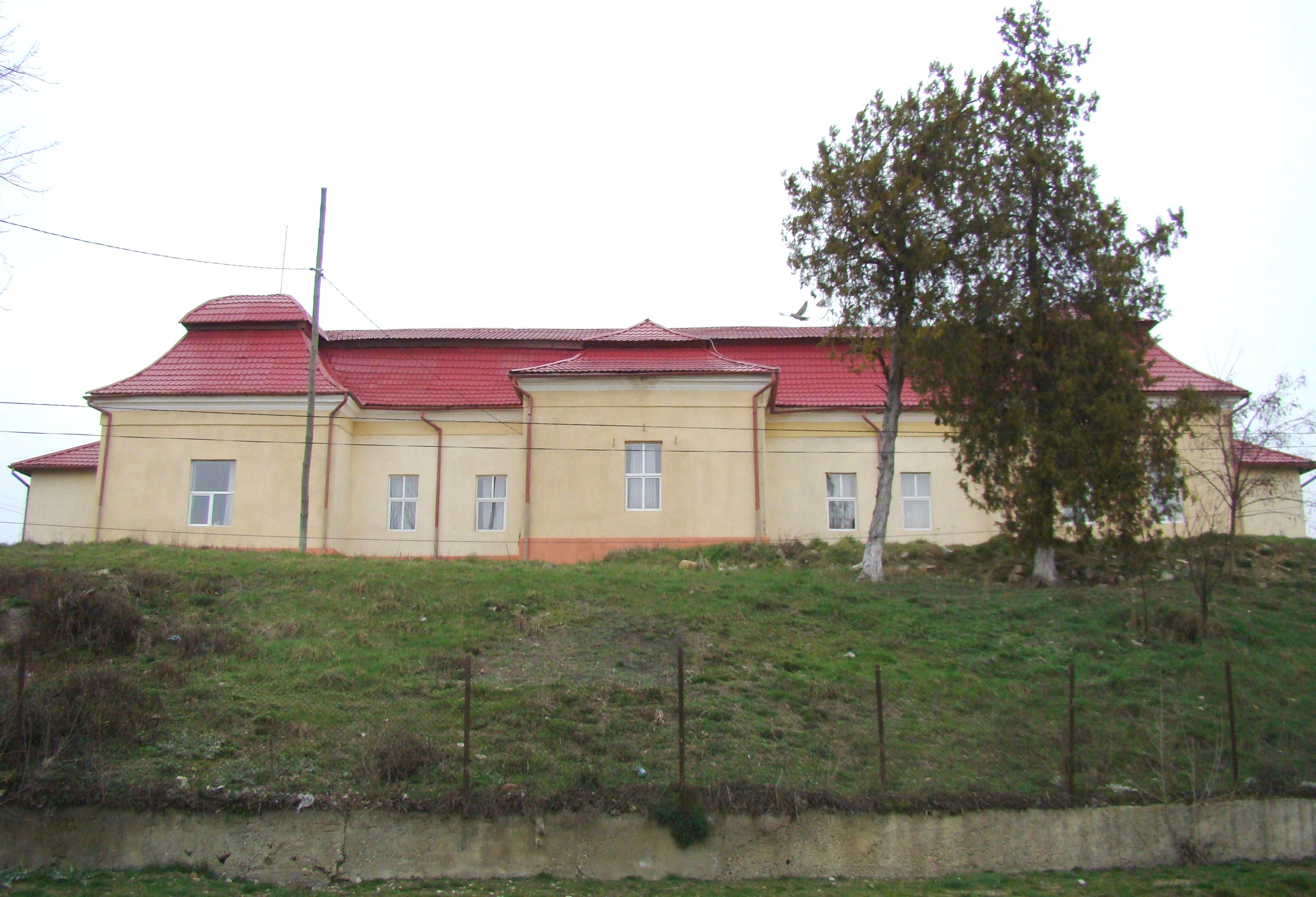
Teleki mansion in Cuzdrioara

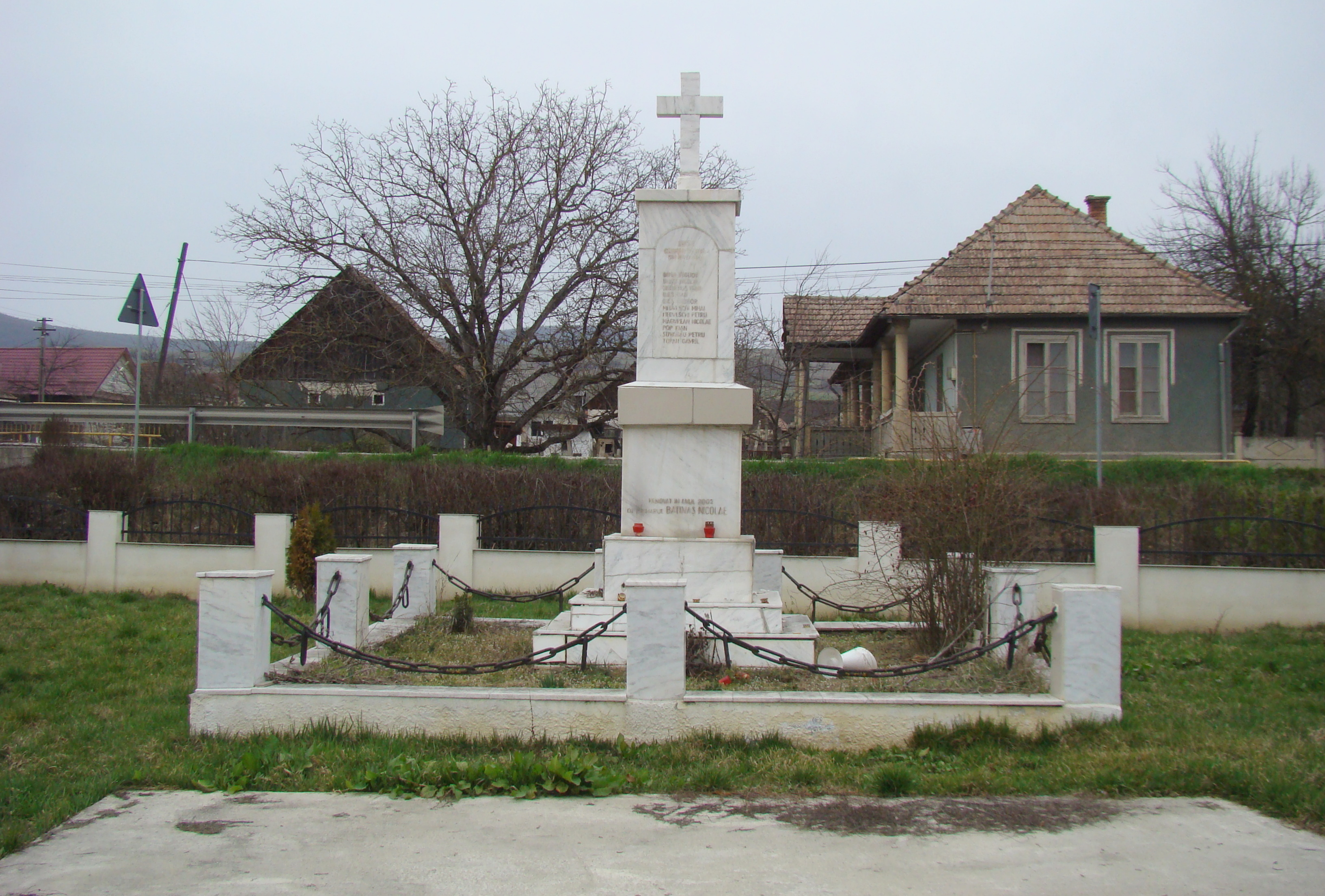
World War II memorial in Cuzdrioara
