= Nimigea =

- Commune
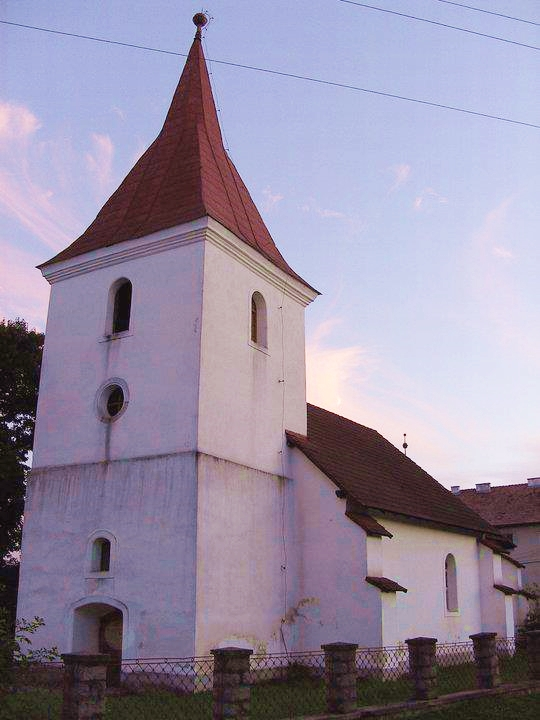
- Reformed church in Nimigea de Jos

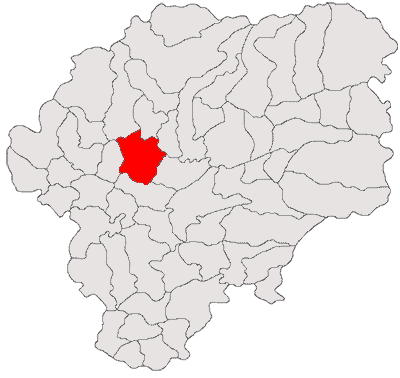
- Location in Bistrița-Năsăud County

- Location in Romania
- Coordinates: 47°15′9″N 24°18′3″E
- Country: Romania
- County: Bistrița-Năsăud
- Subdivisions: Florești, Mintiu, Mititei, Mocod, Mogoșeni, Nimigea de Jos, Nimigea de Sus, Tăure

Government
  - Mayor (2020–2024): Mircea-Gavrila Runcan (PSD)
- Area: 98.36 km^{2} (37.98 sq mi)
- Elevation: 287 m (942 ft)
- Population (2021-12-01): 5,434
  - Density: 55.25/km^{2} (143.1/sq mi)
- Time zone: UTC+02:00 (EET)
  - Summer (DST): UTC+03:00 (EEST)
- Postal code: 427190
- Area code: +40 x59
- Vehicle reg.: BN
- Website: nimigea.bistrita.ro

Nimigea (Hungarian: Nemegye; German: Nindorf; Transylvanian Saxon: Nindref) is a commune in Bistrița-Năsăud County, Transylvania, Romania, with 5,324 residents.

It is composed of eight villages: Florești (formerly Vireag; Virágosberek), Mintiu (Oláhnémeti; German: Rumänisch-Baierdorf), Mititei (Mittye), Mocod (Makód or Szamosmakód; German: Mokod or Makendorf or Malkendorf), Mogoșeni (formerly Mogoșmort; Magasmart or Szamosmagasmart), Nimigea de Jos (the commune center; Magyarnemegye), Nimigea de Sus (Oláhnemegye or Szásznémeti), and Tăure (Tóhát).

The commune lies on the Transylvanian Plateau, at the confluence of the river Someșul Mare with its left tributary, the Bratoșa. It is located in the central-west part of the county, at a distance of 17 km (11 mi) from the town of Beclean and 28 km (17 mi) from the county seat, Bistrița.

At the 2011 census, 78% of inhabitants were Romanians, 13% Hungarians, and 6.6% Roma. 77.7% were Romanian Orthodox, 13.3% Reformed, and 5.5% Pentecostal.

== Notable people ==
- Ion Ciocan
