= Rebrișoara =

- Commune
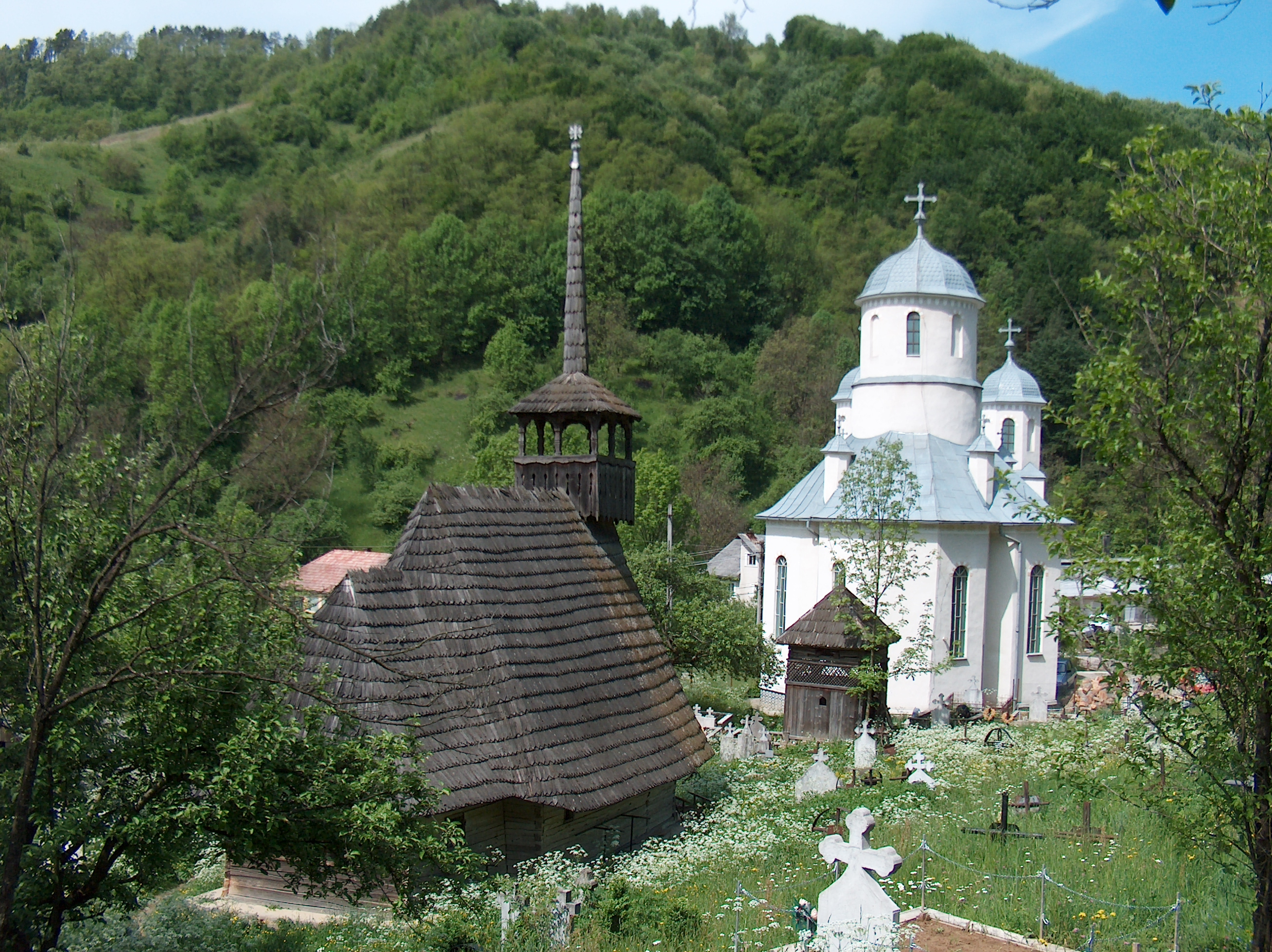
- Churches in Gersa

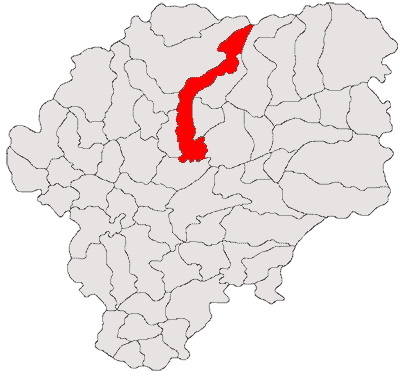
- Location in Bistrița-Năsăud County

- Location in Romania
- Coordinates: 47°17′N 24°27′E
- Country: Romania
- County: Bistrița-Năsăud

Government
  - Mayor (2020–2024): Viorel Clapău (PNL)
- Area: 136.87 km^{2} (52.85 sq mi)
- Elevation: 338 m (1,109 ft)
- Population (2021-12-01): 4,209
  - Density: 30.75/km^{2} (79.65/sq mi)
- Time zone: UTC+02:00 (EET)
  - Summer (DST): UTC+03:00 (EEST)
- Postal code: 427240
- Area code: +(40) x59
- Vehicle reg.: BN
- Website: www.primariarebrisoara.ro

Rebrișoara (Hungarian: Kisrebra; German: Kleinrebra) is a commune in Bistrița-Năsăud County, Transylvania, Romania. It is composed of four villages: Gersa I, Gersa II (both Gertia), Poderei (Szamosontuli), and Rebrișoara. The existence of the main village was first mentioned in 1440.
