= Suhard Mountains =

Mountain range in Romania

Coordinates: 47°30′N 25°06′E

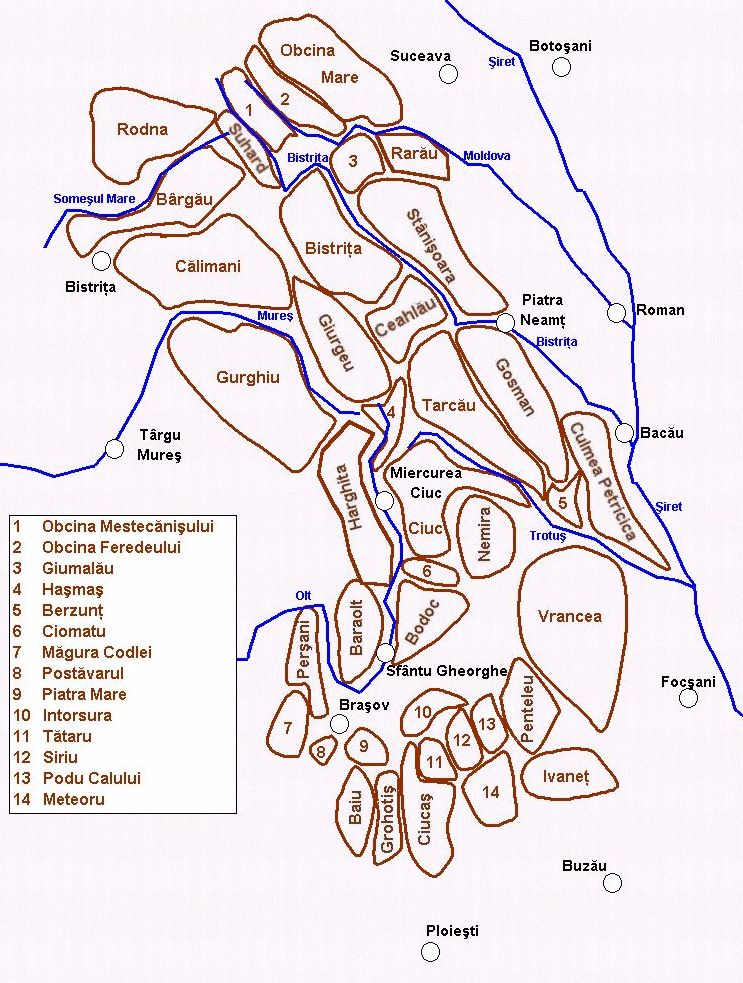
Map of the Eastern Carpathians, with the Suhard Mountains in the north

The Suhard Mountains (Romanian: Munții Suhard) are a mountain range located in Romania, part of the Eastern Carpathian Mountains. They are bordered by the Rodna Mountains to the northwest, the river Bistrița Aurie to the northeast, the river Dorna to the southeast, and the Bârgău Mountains to the southwest. The highest peak is Vârful Omu, at 1,931 m (6,335 ft).
