= Maieru =

- Commune
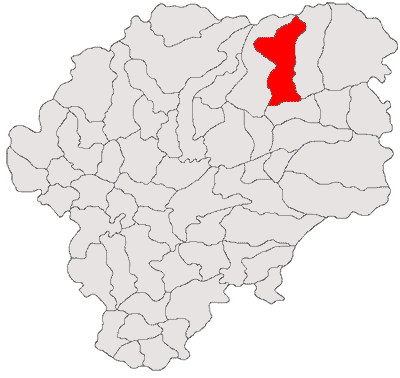
- Location in Bistrița-Năsăud County

- Location in Romania
- Coordinates: 47°24′N 24°45′E
- Country: Romania
- County: Bistrița-Năsăud

Government
  - Mayor (2024–2028): Vasile Borș
- Area: 130.16 km^{2} (50.26 sq mi)
- Elevation: 480 m (1,570 ft)
- Population (2021-12-01): 7,579
  - Density: 58/km^{2} (150/sq mi)
- Time zone: EET/EEST (UTC+2/+3)
- Postal code: 427130
- Area code: +(40) x63
- Vehicle reg.: BN
- Website: primariamaieru.ro

Maieru (Hungarian: Major; German: Meierhof) is a commune in Bistrița-Năsăud County, Transylvania, Romania. It is composed of two villages, Anieș (Dombhát) and Maieru.

== People ==
- Emil Rebreanu (1891–1917), Austro-Hungarian Romanian military officer executed during World War I
- Maria Cioncan (1977-2007), middle distance runner
- Octavian Utalea (1868–1932), mayor of Cluj (1923–1926)
