= Șanț =

- Commune
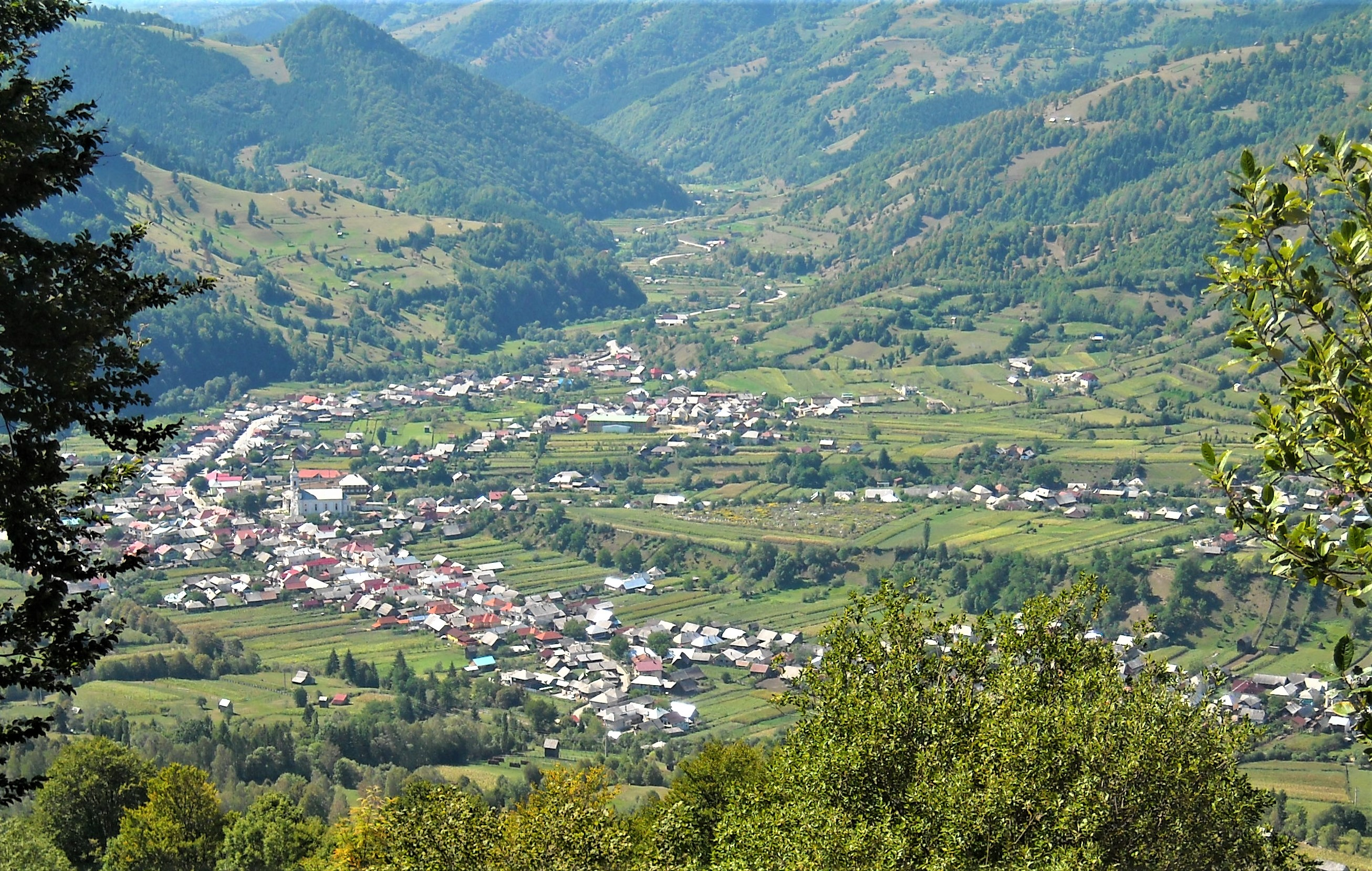

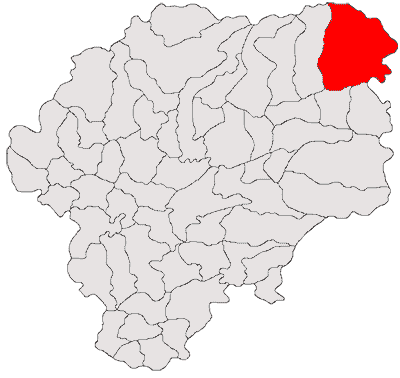
- Location in Bistrița-Năsăud County

- Location in Romania
- Coordinates: 47°27′N 24°54′E
- Country: Romania
- County: Bistrița-Năsăud

Government
  - Mayor (2020–2024): Marian-Viorel Forogău (PNL)
- Area: 209.04 km^{2} (80.71 sq mi)
- Elevation: 600 m (2,000 ft)
- Population (2021-12-01): 3,247
  - Density: 15.53/km^{2} (40.23/sq mi)
- Time zone: UTC+02:00 (EET)
  - Summer (DST): UTC+03:00 (EEST)
- Postal code: 427285
- Vehicle reg.: BN
- Website: www.comunasant.ro

Șanț (Hungarian: Újradna; German: Neurodna or Neu-Rodna) is a commune in Bistrița-Năsăud County, Transylvania, Romania. It is composed of two villages, Șanț and Valea Mare (Hungarian: Máriavölgy; German: Sankt Maria).

The commune is located in the northeastern corner of the county, at the foot of the Rodna Mountains. It surrounded by several peaks, including Ineu (2,279 m (7,477 ft)) and Ineuț (2,202 m (7,224 ft)) to the north, Omu (2,010 m (6,590 ft)) and Cucureasa (1,778 m (5,833 ft)) to the east, and Cornu (1,300 m (4,300 ft)) to the southwest.

Șanț was founded around the year 1600, initially as a hamlet within Rodna Veche commune. Since 1773 it has been documented as an independent commune, under the name of Rodna Nouă; its name was changed to Șanț in 1925.

The main occupations of the inhabitants are wood exploitation and processing, forest care and regeneration activities, agriculture, animal husbandry, animal products, and traditional crafts.

== Natives ==
- Louis Dolivet (1908–1989), American writer, magazine editor, film producer, and alleged Soviet spy
- Enea Grapini (1893–1980), engineer and politician
- Grigore Moisil (1814–1891), cleric
