= Negrilești, Bistrița-Năsăud =

Negrilești
- Commune
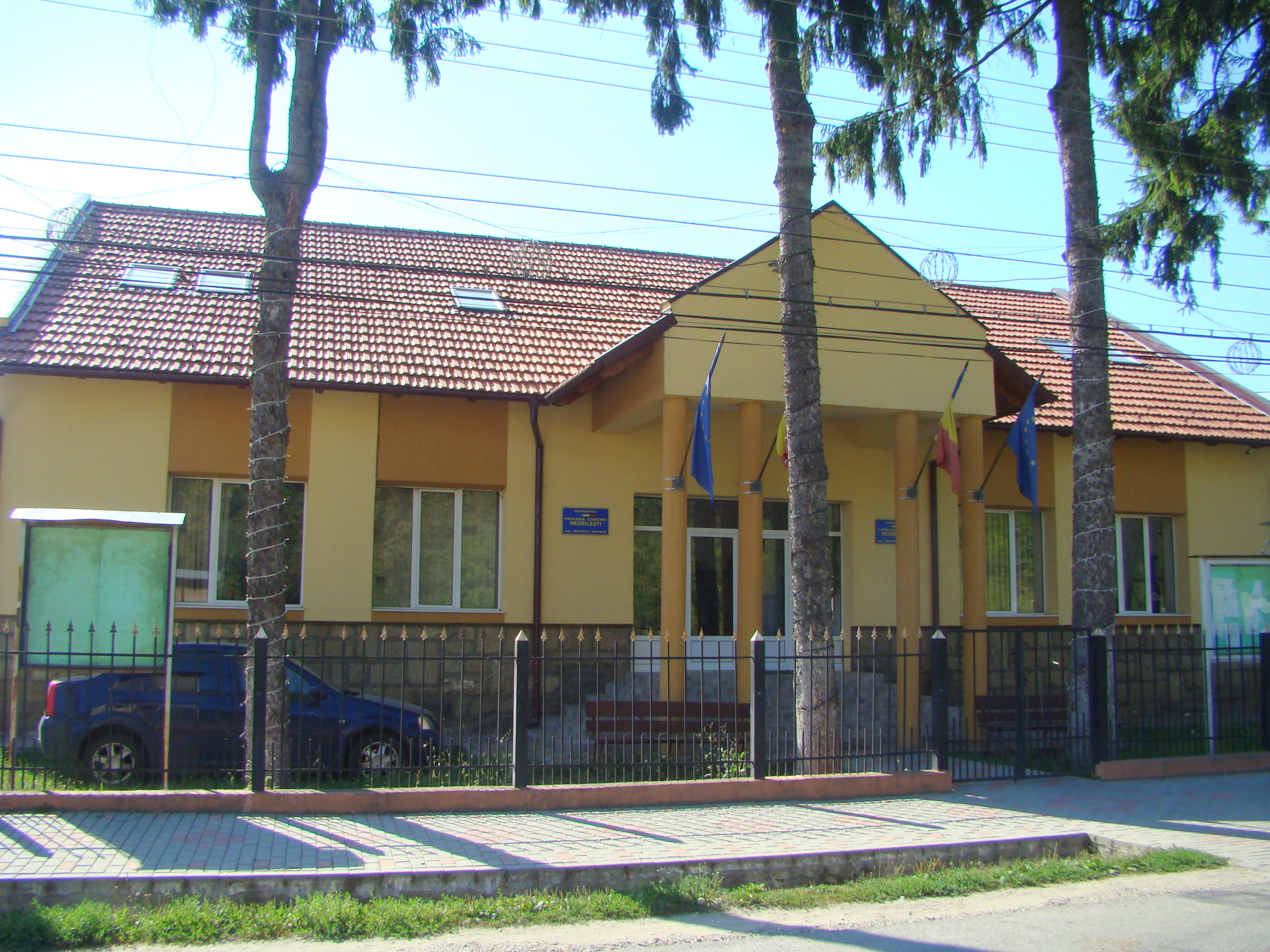
- Negrilești town hall

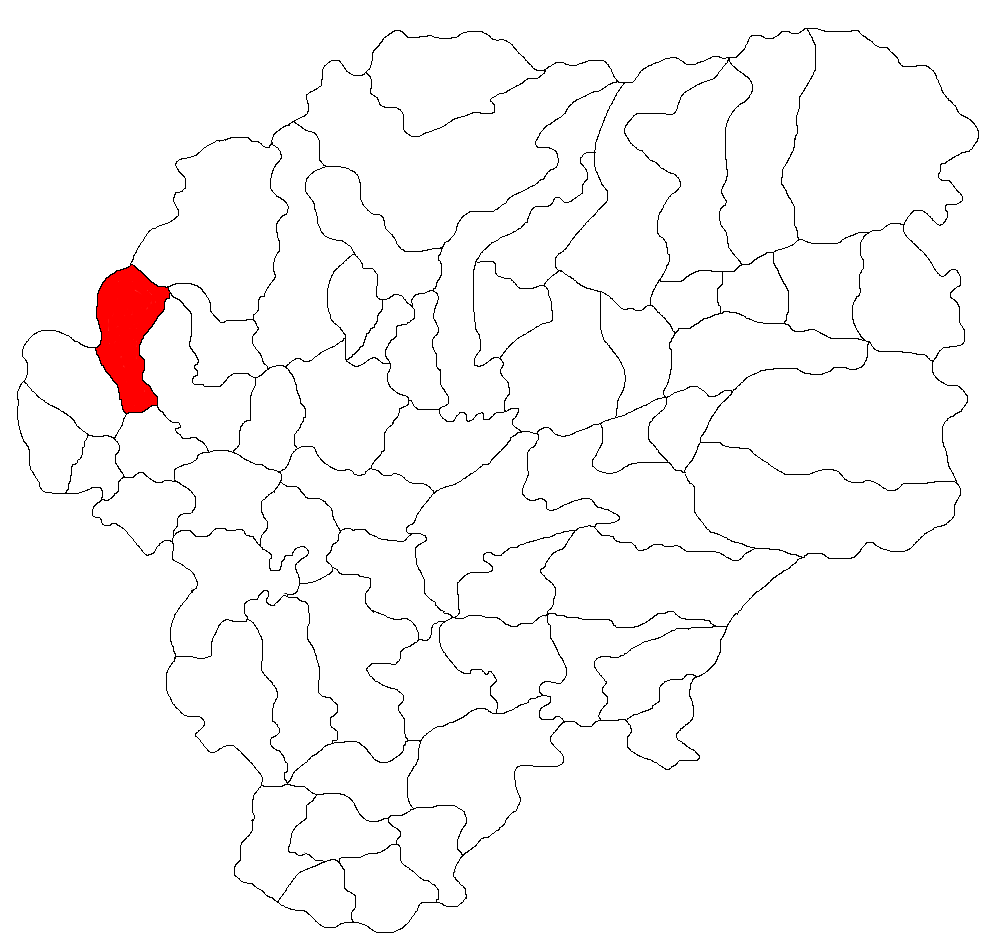
- Location in Bistrița-Năsăud County

- Location in Romania
- Coordinates: 47°16′N 24°03′E
- Country: Romania
- County: Bistrița-Năsăud

Government
  - Mayor (2020–2024): Dumitru Costin (PSD)
- Area: 60.66 km^{2} (23.42 sq mi)
- Elevation: 328 m (1,076 ft)
- Population (2021-12-01): 2,071
  - Density: 34.14/km^{2} (88.43/sq mi)
- Time zone: UTC+02:00 (EET)
  - Summer (DST): UTC+03:00 (EEST)
- Postal code: 427068
- Area code: +40 263
- Vehicle reg.: BN
- Website: www.primariacomuneinegrilesti.ro

Negrilești (Hungarian: Négerfalva) is a commune in Bistrița-Năsăud County, Transylvania, Romania. It is composed of three villages: Breaza (Emberfő), Negrilești and Purcărete (Porkerec). These belonged to Ciceu-Giurgești Commune until 2002, when they were split off.

== Natives ==
- Mihály Dávid (1886–1945), Hungarian athlete
