= Bistrița-Năsăud County =

County of Romania

Coordinates: 47.1389°N 24.5003°E

Bistrița-Năsăud County Județul Bistrița-Năsăud
- County
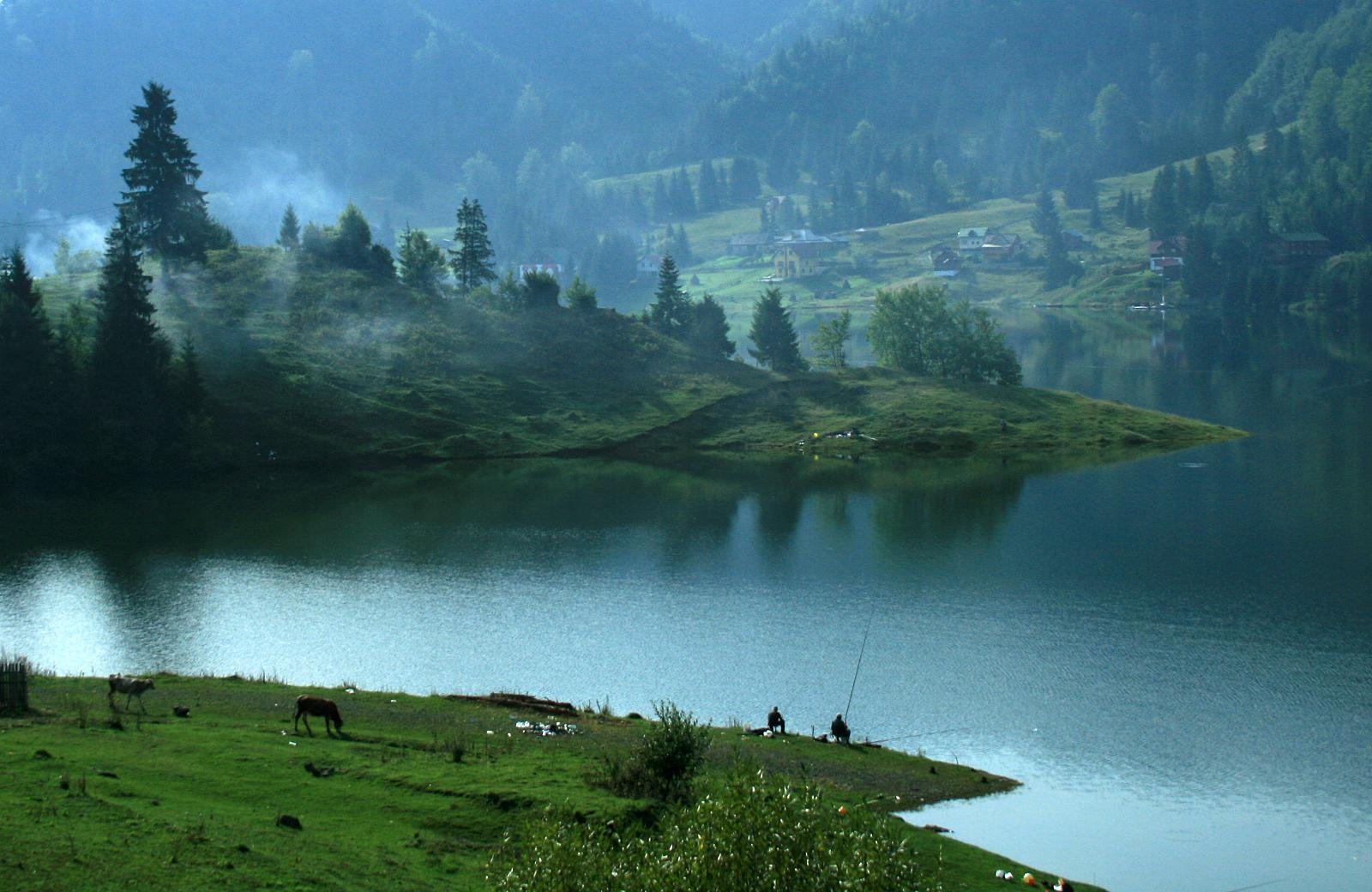
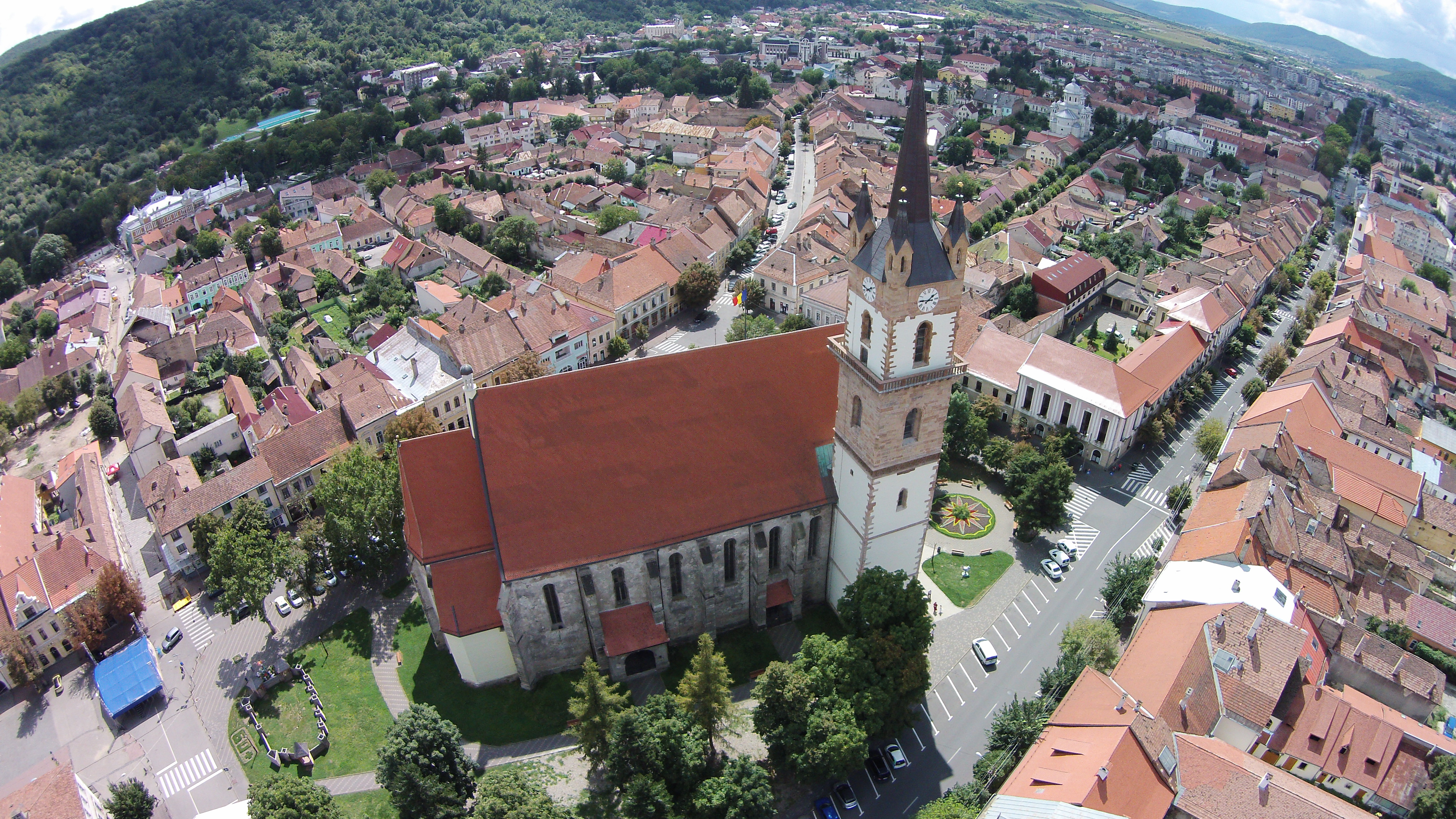
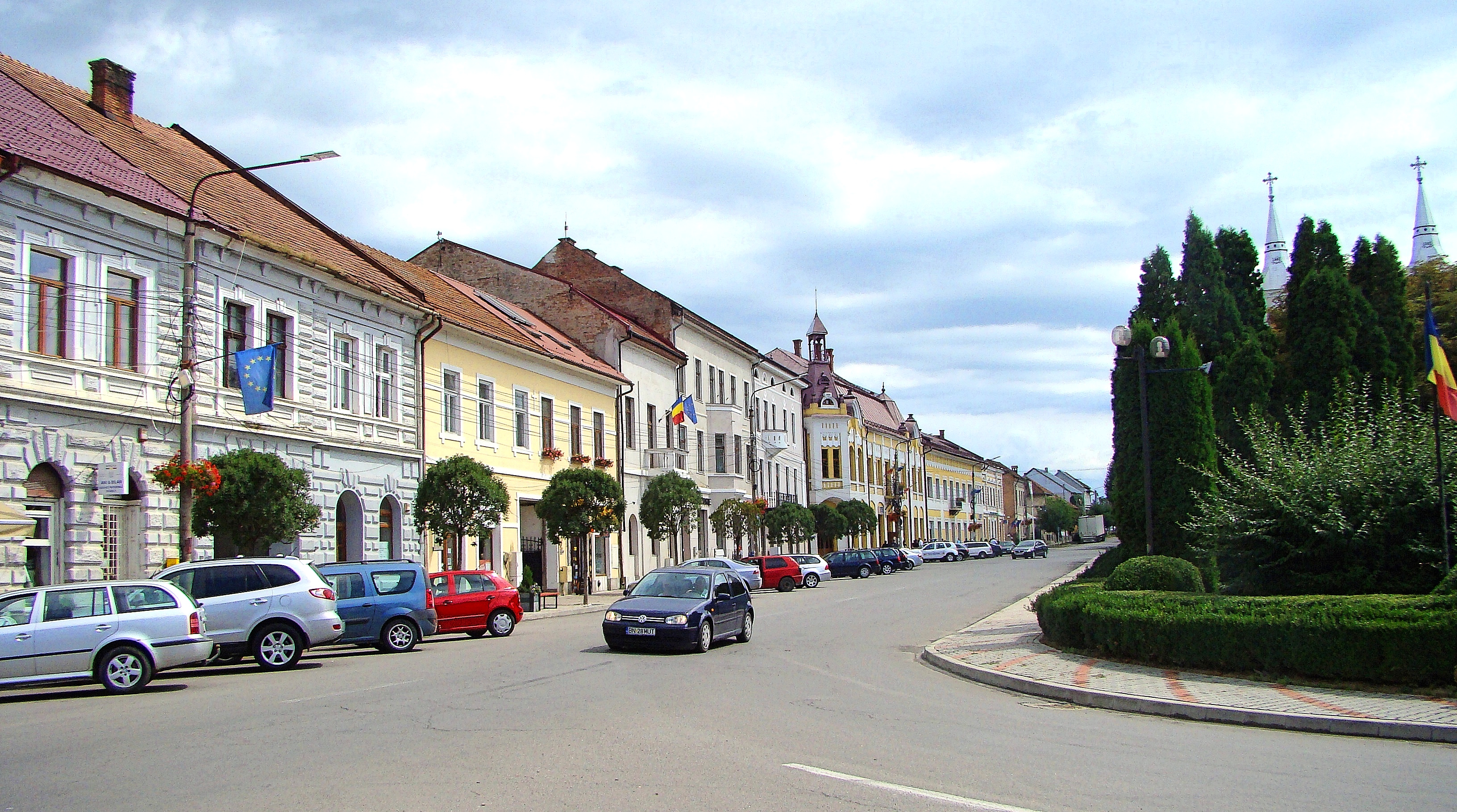
- Colibița Lake Bistrița Năsăud

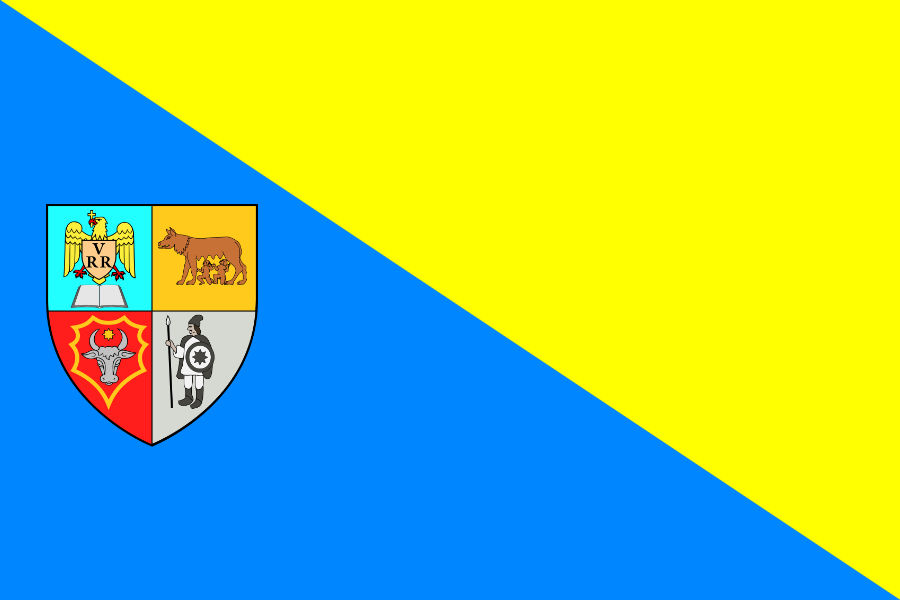
- Flag Coat of arms

- Location of Bistrița-Năsăud County in Romania
- Country: Romania
- Development region^{1}: Nord-Vest
- Historic region: Transylvania
- Capital city (Reședință de județ): Bistrița

Government
  - Type: County Council
  - President of the County Council: Emil Radu Moldovan (PSD)
  - Prefect^{2}: Teofil-Iulian Cioarbă

Area
  - Total: 5,355 km^{2} (2,068 sq mi)
  - Rank: 26th in Romania

Population (1st of December 2021)
  - Total: 295,988
  - Rank: 32nd in Romania
  - Density: 55.27/km^{2} (143.2/sq mi)
- Time zone: UTC+2 (EET)
  - Summer (DST): UTC+3 (EEST)
- Postal Code: 42wxyz^{3}
- Area code: +40 x63^{4}
- Car Plates: BN^{5}
- GDP: US$4.040 billion (2025)
- GDP per capita: US$13,649 (2025)
- Website: County Council; County Prefecture
- ^{1}The developing regions of Romania have no administrative role, but were formed in order to manage funds from the European Union^{2} as of 2007, Romanian prefects are not politicians, but public functionaries. They are not allowed political party membership, and are banned from political activity for six months after resigning (or being excluded) from the public functionaries' corps.^{3}w, x, y, and z are digits that indicate the city, the street, part of the street, or even the building of the address^{4}x is a digit indicating the operator: 2 for the former national operator, Romtelecom, and 3 for the other ground telephone networks^{5}used on both the plates of the vehicles that operate only in the county limits (like utility vehicles, ATVs, etc.), and the ones used outside the county

Bistrița-Năsăud (Romanian pronunciation: [ˈbistritsa nəsəˈud]) is a county (județ) of Romania, in Transylvania, with its capital city at Bistrița.

== Name ==
In Hungarian, it is known as Beszterce-Naszód megye, and in German as Kreis Bistritz-Nassod. The name is identical with the county created in 1876, Beszterce-Naszód County (Romanian: Comitatul Bistrița-Năsăud) in the Kingdom of Hungary (the county was recreated in 1940 after the Second Vienna Award, as it became part of Hungary again until 1944). Except these, as part of Romania, until 1925 the former administrative organizations were kept when a new county system was introduced. Between 1925–1940 and 1945–1950, most of its territory belonged to the Năsăud County, with smaller parts belonging to the Mureș, Cluj, and Someș counties.

== Geography ==

The county has a total area of 5,355 km^{2} (2,068 sq mi). One third of this surface represents the mountains from the Eastern Carpathians group: the Țibleș, Rodna, Bârgău, and Călimani Mountains. The rest of the territory represents the North-East side of the Transylvanian Plateau.

The main river crossing the county is the Someșul Mare. On the Bistrița River there is a big dam and a lake.

=== Neighbours ===
- Suceava County in the East.
- Cluj County in the West.
- Maramureș County in the North.
- Mureș County in the South.

== Demographics ==
According to the 2021 census, the county had a population of 295,988 and the population density was 55.3/km^{2} (143.2/sq mi).

Ethnic composition of Bistrița-Năsăud County (2021)
1. Romanians (91.6%)
2. Romani (4.11%)
3. Hungarians (4.08%)
4. Germans (Transylvanian Saxons) (0.10%)
5. Others (0.18%)
Religious composition of Bistrița-Năsăud County (2021)
1. Romanian Orthodox (82.5%)
2. Pentecostals (9.04%)
3. Reformed (3.50%)
4. Greek Catholics (1.58%)
5. Roman Catholics (0.88%)
6. Baptists (0.68%)
7. Others (1.44%)
8. Irreligious, atheist and agnostic (0.42%)

Year	County population
1948	233,650
1956	255,789 ▲
1966	269,954 ▲
1977	286,628 ▲
1992	327,238 ▲
2002	311,657 ▼
2011	277,861 ▼
2021	295,988 ▲

== Politics ==
The Bistrița-Năsăud County Council, renewed at the 2024 local elections, consists of 31 councilors, with the following party composition:

Party	Seats	Current County Council
Social Democratic Party (PSD)	15	
National Liberal Party (PNL)	10	
Alliance for the Union of Romanians (AUR)	4	
Democratic Union of Hungarians in Romania (UDMR)	2	

== Administrative divisions ==
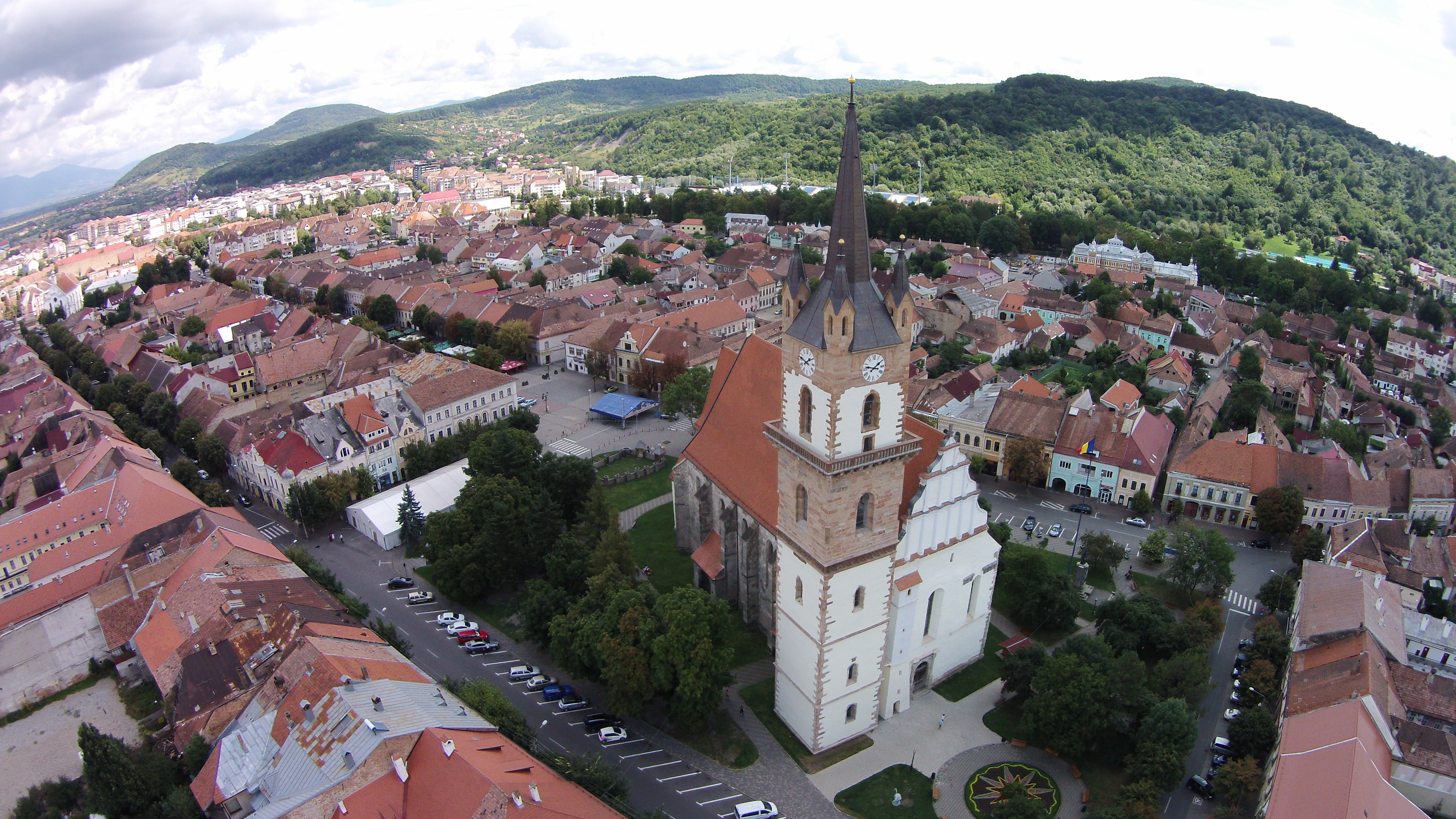
Bistrița (German: Bistritz/Nösen)

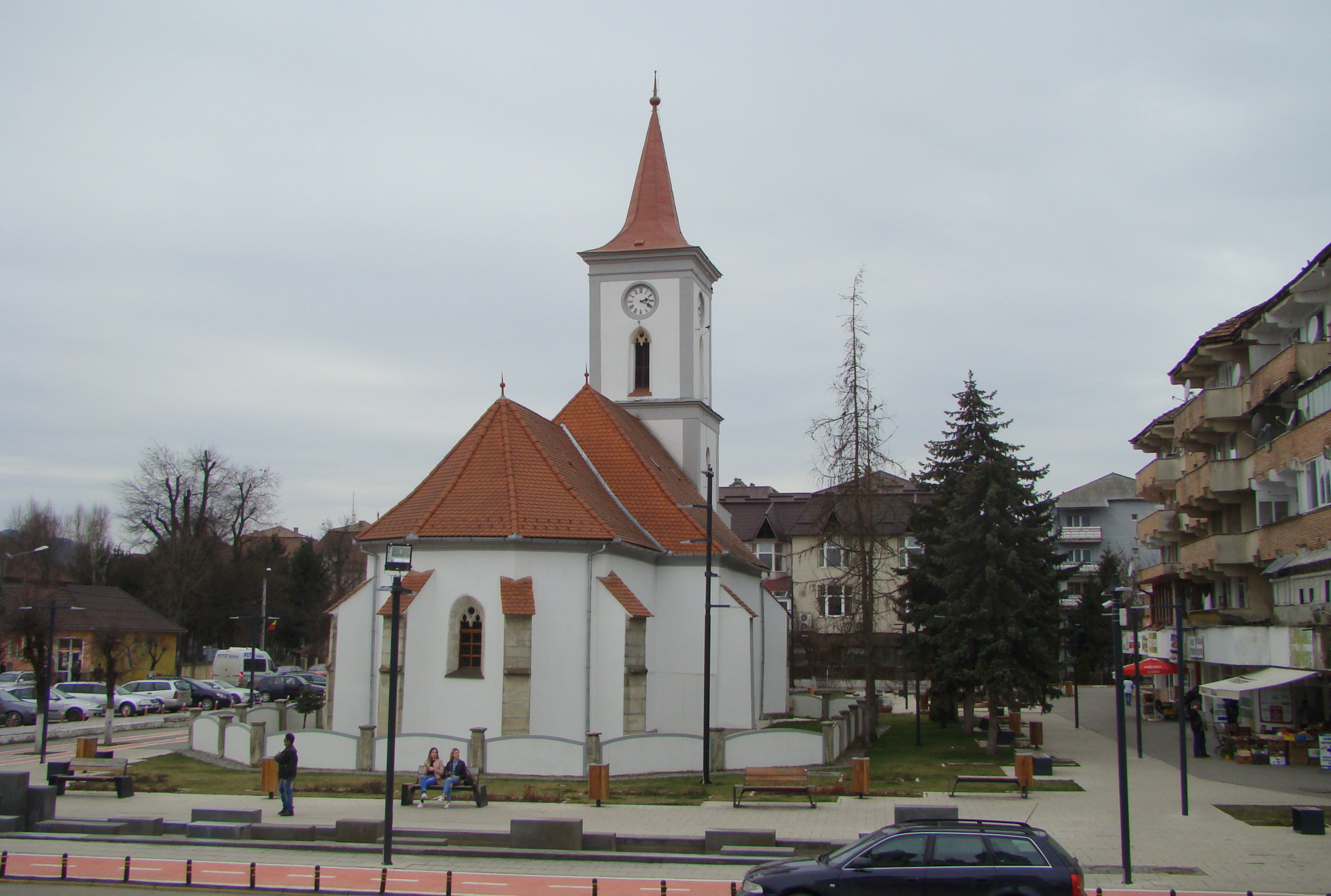
Beclean

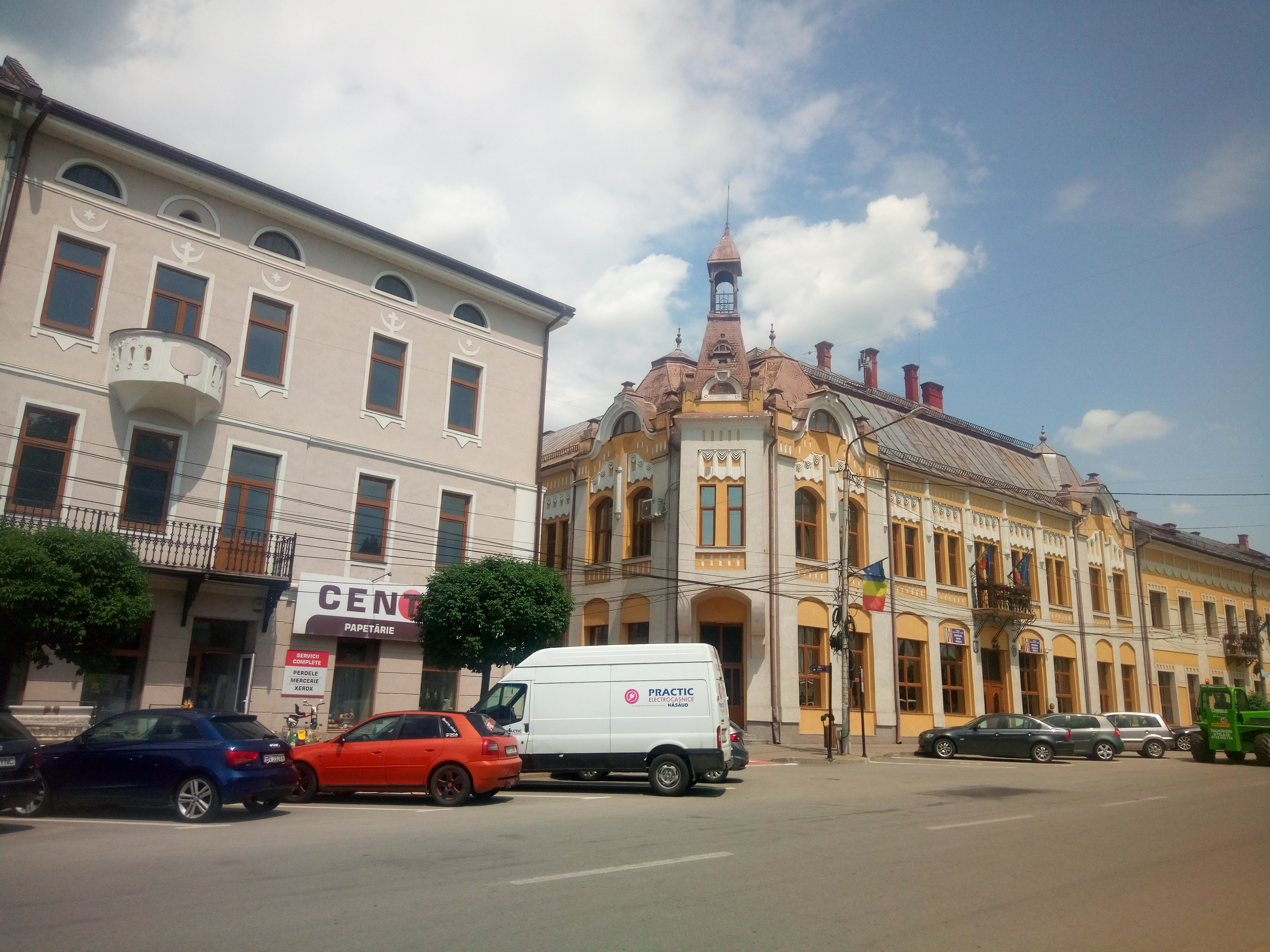
Entrance from the west, in Năsăud

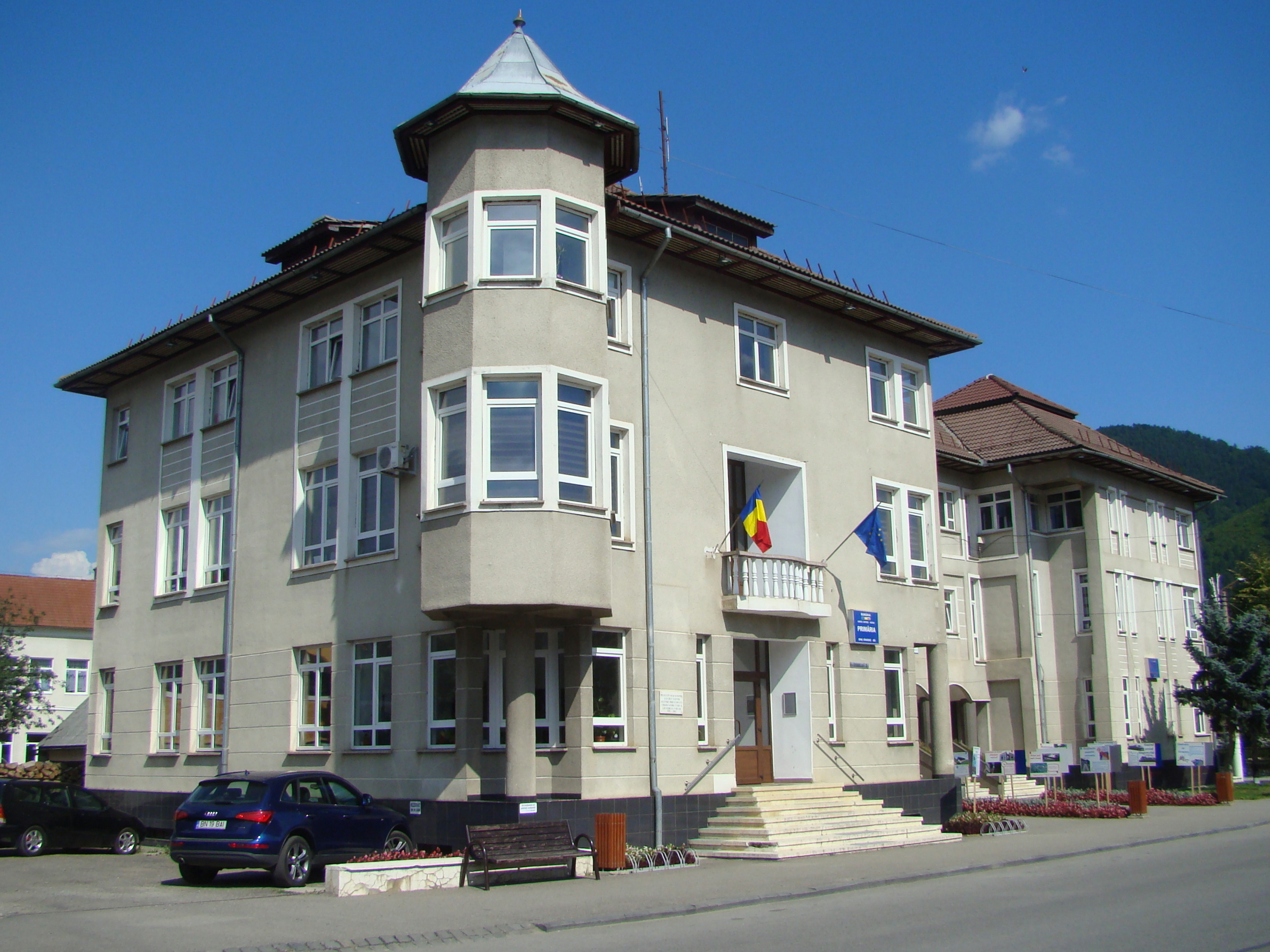
Sângeorz-Băi

Bistrița-Năsăud County has 1 municipality, 3 towns, and 58 communes.

- Municipalities
  - Bistrița – capital city; 78,877 (as of 2021)
- Towns
  - Beclean
  - Năsăud
  - Sângeorz-Băi
- Communes
  - Bistrița Bârgăului
  - Braniștea
  - Budacu de Jos
  - Budești
  - Căianu Mic
  - Cetate
  - Chiochiș
  - Chiuza
  - Ciceu-Giurgești
  - Ciceu-Mihăiești
  - Coșbuc
  - Dumitra
  - Dumitrița
  - Feldru
  - Galații Bistriței
  - Ilva Mare
  - Ilva Mică
  - Josenii Bârgăului
  - Leșu
  - Lechința
  - Livezile
  - Lunca Ilvei
  - Maieru
  - Matei
  - Măgura Ilvei
  - Mărișelu
  - Miceștii de Câmpie
  - Milaș
  - Monor
  - Negrilești
  - Nimigea
  - Nușeni
  - Parva
  - Petru Rareș
  - Poiana Ilvei
  - Prundu Bârgăului
  - Rebra
  - Rebrișoara
  - Rodna
  - Romuli
  - Runcu Salvei
  - Salva
  - Sânmihaiu de Câmpie
  - Șieu
  - Șieu-Odorhei
  - Șieu-Măgheruș
  - Șieuț
  - Șintereag
  - Silivașu de Câmpie
  - Spermezeu
  - Șanț
  - Târlișua
  - Teaca
  - Telciu
  - Tiha Bârgăului
  - Uriu
  - Urmeniș
  - Zagra

== People ==
Natives of the county include:

- George Coșbuc
- Andrei Mureșanu
- Liviu Rebreanu

== See also ==
- Former Beszterce-Naszód County of the Kingdom of Hungary
- The Via Transilvanica long-distance hiking and biking trail, which crosses the county
