= List of settlements in Cluj County =

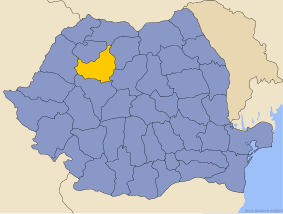
Cluj County in Romania

This is a list of settlements in Cluj County, Romania.

The following are the county's cities and sole town (Huedin), along with their attached villages:

| City/Town | Villages |
|---|---|
| Cluj-Napoca | |
| Câmpia Turzii | |
| Dej | Ocna-Dejului, Peștera, Pintic, Șomcutu Mic |
| Gherla | Băița, Hășdate, Silivaș |
| Turda | |
| Huedin | Bicălatu |

The following are the county's communes, with component villages:

| Commune | Villages |
|---|---|
| Aghireșu | Aghireșu, Aghireșu-Fabrici, Arghișu, Băgara, Dâncu, Dorolțu, Inucu, Leghia, Macău, Ticu, Ticu-Colonie |
| Aiton | Aiton, Rediu |
| Aluniș | Aluniș, Corneni, Ghirolt, Pruneni, Vale |
| Apahida | Apahida, Bodrog, Câmpenești, Corpadea, Dezmir, Pata, Sânnicoară, Sub Coastă |
| Așchileu | Așchileu Mare, Așchileu Mic, Cristorel, Dorna, Fodora |
| Baciu | Baciu, Corușu, Mera, Popești, Rădaia, Săliștea Nouă, Suceagu |
| Băișoara | Băișoara, Frăsinet, Moara de Pădure, Muntele Băișorii, Muntele Bocului, Muntele Cacovei, Muntele Filii, Muntele Săcelului, Săcel |
| Beliș | Beliș, Bălcești, Dealu Botii, Giurcuța de Sus, Giurcuța de Jos, Poiana Horea, Smida |
| Bobâlna | Bobâlna, Antăș, Băbdiu, Blidărești, Cremenea, Maia, Oșorhel, Pruni, Răzbuneni, Suarăș, Vâlcelele |
| Bonțida | Bonțida, Coasta, Răscruci, Tăușeni |
| Borșa | Borșa, Borșa-Cătun, Borșa-Crestaia, Ciumăfaia, Giula |
| Buza | Buza, Rotunda |
| Căianu | Căianu, Bărăi, Căianu Mic, Căianu-Vamă, Vaida-Cămăraș, Văleni |
| Călăraşi | Călărași, Bogata, Călărași Gară |
| Călățele | Călățele, Călata, Dealu Negru, Călățele-Pădure, Finciu, Văleni |
| Cămărașu | Cămărașu, Năoiu, Sâmboleni |
| Căpușu Mare | Căpușu Mare, Agârbiciu, Bălcești, Căpușu Mic, Dângău Mare, Dângău Mic, Dumbrava, Păniceni, Straja |
| Cășeiu | Cășeiu, Comorâța, Coplean, Custura, Gârbău Dejului, Guga, Leurda, Rugășești, Sălătruc, Urișor |
| Cătina | Cătina, Copru, Feldioara, Hagău, Hodaie, Valea Caldă |
| Câțcău | Câțcău, Muncel, Sălișca |
| Ceanu Mare | Ceanu Mare, Andici, Boian, Bolduț, Ciurgău, Dosu Napului, Fânațe, Hodăi-Boian, Iacobeni, Morțești, Stârcu, Strucut, Valea lui Cati |
| Chinteni | Chinteni, Deușu, Vechea, Măcicașu, Sânmărtin, Feiurdeni, Pădureni, Săliștea Veche |
| Chiuiești | Chiuiești, Dosu Bricii, Huta, Măgoaja, Strâmbu, Valea Cășeielului, Valea lui Opriș |
| Ciucea | Ciucea, Vânători |
| Ciurila | Ciurila, Șutu, Filea de Jos, Filea de Sus, Pădureni, Pruniș, Sălicea, Săliște |
| Cojocna | Cojocna, Boj-Cătun, Boju, Cara, Huci, Iuriu de Câmpie, Moriști, Straja |
| Cornești | Cornești, Bârlea, Igriția, Lujerdiu, Morău, Stoiana, Tiocu de Jos, Tiocu de Sus, Tioltiur |
| Cuzdrioara | Cuzdrioara, Mănășturel, Valea Gârboului |
| Dăbâca | Dăbâca, Luna de Jos, Pâglișa |
| Feleacu | Feleacu, Gheorghieni, Vâlcele, Sărădiș, Casele Micești |
| Fizeșu Gherlii | Fizeșu Gherlii, Bonț, Nicula, Săcălaia |
| Florești | Florești, Luna de Sus, Tăuți |
| Frata | Frata, Berchieșu, Oaș, Olariu, Pădurea Iacobeni, Poiana Frății, Răzoare, Soporu de Câmpie |
| Gârbău | Gârbău, Cornești, Nădășelu, Turea, Viștea |
| Geaca | Geaca, Chiriș, Lacu, Legii, Puini, Sucutard |
| Gilău | Gilău, Someșu Cald, Someșu Rece |
| Iara | Iara, Agriș, Borzești, Buru, Cacova Ierii, Făgetu Ierii, Lungești, Măgura Ierii, Mașca, Ocolișel, Surduc, Valea Agrișului, Valea Vadului |
| Iclod | Iclod, Fundătura, Iclozel, Livada, Orman |
| Izvoru Crișului | Șaula, Nadășu, Nearșova |
| Jichișu de Jos | Jichișu de Jos, Codor, Jichișu de Sus, Șigău, Tărpiu |
| Jucu | Jucu de Sus, Gădălin, Juc-Herghelie, Jucu de Mijloc, Vișea |
| Luna | Luna, Gligorești, Luncani |
| Măguri-Răcătău | Răcătău, Măguri, Muntele Rece |
| Mănăstireni | Mănăstireni, Ardeova, Bedeciu, Bica, Dretea, Mănășturu Românesc |
| Mărgău | Mărgău, Bociu, Buteni, Ciuleni, Răchițele, Scrind-Frăsinet |
| Mărișel | Mărișel |
| Mica | Mica, Dâmbu Mare, Mănăstirea, Nireș, Sânmărghita, Valea Cireșoii, Valea Luncii |
| Mihai Viteazu | Mihai Viteazu, Cheia, Cornești |
| Mintiu Gherlii | Bunești, Mintiu Gherlii, Nima, Pădurenii, Petrești, Salatiu |
| Mociu | Mociu, Boteni, Chesău, Crișeni, Falca, Ghirișu Român, Roșieni, Turmași, Zorenii de Vale |
| Moldovenești | Moldovenești, Bădeni, Pietroasa, Plăiești, Podeni, Stejeriș |
| Negreni | Negreni, Bucea, Prelucele |
| Pălatca | Pălatca, Băgaciu, Mureșenii de Câmpie, Petea, Sava |
| Panticeu | Panticeu, Cătălina, Cubleșu Someșan, Dârja, Sărata |
| Petreștii de Jos | Petreștii de Jos, Crăești, Deleni, Livada, Petreștii de Mijloc, Petreștii de Sus, Plaiuri |
| Ploscoș | Ploscoș, Crairât, Lobodaș, Valea Florilor |
| Poieni | Poieni, Bologa, Cerbești, Hodișu, Lunca Vișagului, Morlaca, Tranișu, Valea Drăganului |
| Râșca | Râșca, Dealu Mare, Lăpuștești, Mărcești, Stațiunea Fântânele |
| Recea-Cristur | Recea Cristur, Căprioara, Ciubanca, Ciubăncuța, Elciu, Escu, Jurca, Osoi, Pustuța |
| Săcuieu | Săcuieu, Rogojel, Vișagu |
| Săndulești | Săndulești, Copăceni |
| Săvădisla | Săvădisla, Finișel, Hășdate, Lita, Liteni, Stolna, Vălișoara, Vlaha |
| Sâncraiu | Sâncraiu, Alunișu, Domoșu, Brăișoru, Horlacea |
| Sânmartin | Sânmartin, Ceaba, Cutca, Diviciorii Mari, Diviciorii Mici, Măhal, Sâmboieni, Târgușor |
| Sânpaul | Sânpaul, Berindu, Mihăiești, Sumurducu, Șardu, Topa Mică |
| Sic | Sic |
| Suatu | Suatu, Aruncuta, Dâmburile |
| Tritenii de Jos | Tritenii de Jos, Clapa, Colonia, Pădurenii, Tritenii de Sus, Tritenii-Hotar |
| Tureni | Tureni, Ceanu Mic, Comșești, Mărtinești, Micești |
| Țaga | Țaga, Sântioana, Sântejude, Sântejude-Vale, Năsal |
| Unguraș | Unguraș, Batin, Daroț, Sicfa, Valea Ungurașului |
| Vad | Vad, Bogata de Jos, Bogata de Sus, Calna, Cetan, Curtuiușu Dejului, Valea Groșilor |
| Valea Ierii | Valea Ierii, Cerc, Plopi |
| Viișoara | Viișoara, Urca |
| Vultureni | Vultureni, Băbuțiu, Bădești, Chidea, Făureni, Șoimeni |
