= Fizeș (Someș) =

- Location within Romania

Location
- Country: Romania
- Counties: Cluj County
- Villages: Cămărașu, Geaca, Țaga, Fizeșu Gherlii

Physical characteristics
- Mouth: Someșul Mic
  - location: Gherla
  - coordinates: 47.1356°N 23.9169°E
- Length: 46 km (29 mi)
- Basin size: 562 km^{2} (217 sq mi)

Basin features
- Progression: Someșul Mic→ Someș→ Tisza→ Danube→ Black Sea
- Tributaries
  - left: Mociu, Chiriș, Sicu, Hosu
  - right: Cătina, Diviciorii Mari

The Fizeș (Hungarian: Füzes) is a right tributary of the river Someșul Mic in Romania. It discharges into the Someșul Mic in Gherla. Its length is 46 km (29 mi) and its basin size is 562 km^{2} (217 sq mi). Lakes Cătina, Geaca, Sucutard and Țaga are located on the Fizeș. The name in Hungarian means "willow-bed".
