= Țaga =

- Commune
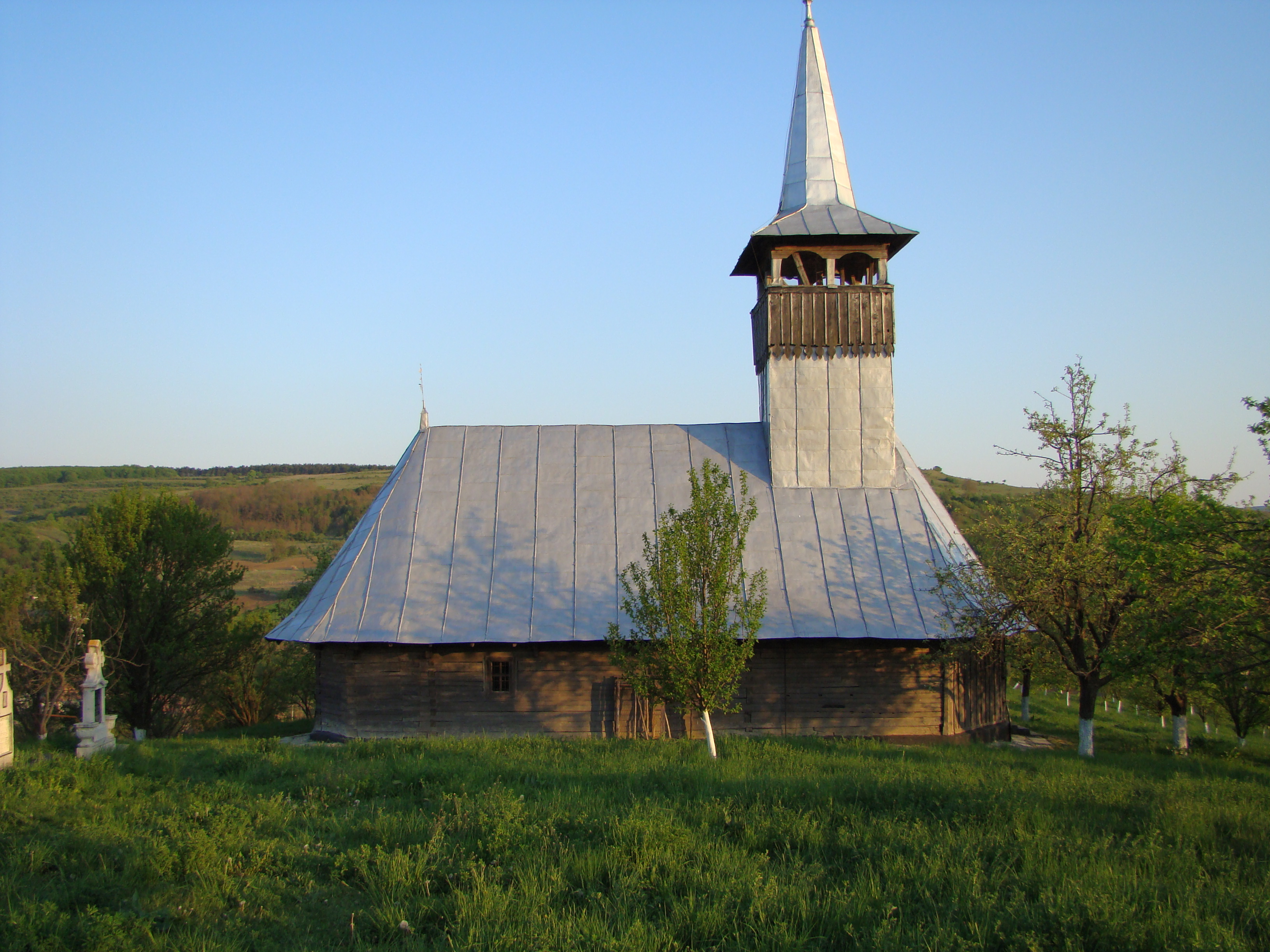
- Wooden church (1804) in Năsal

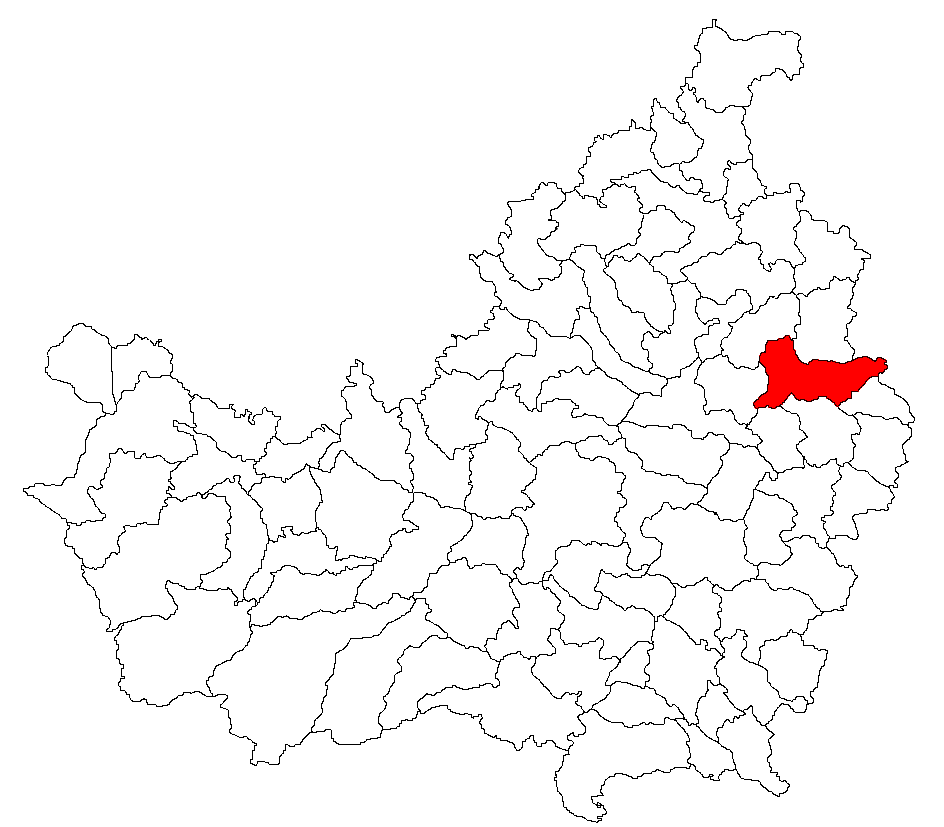
- Location in Cluj County

- Location in Romania
- Coordinates: 46°56′44.52″N 24°3′33.84″E
- Country: Romania
- County: Cluj
- Subdivisions: Năsal, Sântioana, Sântejude, Sântejude-Vale, Țaga

Government
  - Mayor (2020–2024): Romulus Mârza (PNL)
- Area: 100.01 km^{2} (38.61 sq mi)
- Elevation: 313 m (1,027 ft)
- Population (2021-12-01): 1,588
  - Density: 15.88/km^{2} (41.12/sq mi)
- Time zone: UTC+02:00 (EET)
  - Summer (DST): UTC+03:00 (EEST)
- Postal code: 407565
- Area code: +40 x64
- Vehicle reg.: CJ
- Website: primariataga.ro

Țaga (Hungarian: Cege; German: Zegen) is a commune in Cluj County, Transylvania, Romania. It is composed of five villages: Năsal (Noszoly), Sântejude (Vasasszentegyed), Sântejude-Vale (Vasasszentegyedi völgy), Sântioana (Vasasszentiván), and Țaga.

== Geography ==
The commune is located in the eastern part of the county, having as neighbors: to the east Bistrița-Năsăud County and Chiochiș commune, to the south Geaca and Pălatca communes, to the west Sic commune, and to the north Fizeșu Gherlii and Sânmartin communes. Țaga is crossed by the county road DJ 109C Cămărașu–Gherla, a road that connects the national roads Apahida-Reghin and the national road Cluj-Napoca–Gherla–Dej.

== Demographics ==
According to the census from 2002, there were 2,162 people living in this commune; of this population, 91.67% were ethnic Romanians, 6.15% ethnic Hungarians, and 2.12% ethnic Roma. At the 2021 census, Țaga had a population of 1,588; of those, 85.39% were Romanians, 4.79% Hungarians, and 3.02% Roma.

== Natives ==
- Ioan Chezan (born 1945), musician, flutist, and conductor
- Ioan-Aurel Pop (born 1955), historian
