= Nicula =

Nicula is a Romanian surname. Notable people with the surname include:

- Claudia Nicula, Romanian sprint canoer
- Daniel Nicula, Romanian footballer
- Emilian Nicula

== See also ==
- Nicula, a village in Fizeșu Gherlii Commune, Cluj County, Romania
  - Nicula Monastery
