= Ioan Alexandru =

Romanian poet, essayist and politician

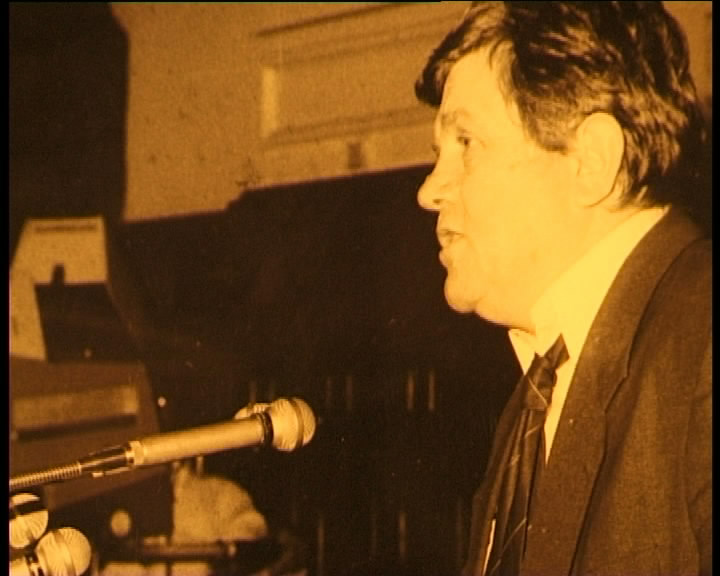
Ioan Alexandru

Ioan Alexandru (Romanian pronunciation: [iˈo̯an alekˈsandru]; born Ion Șandor [iˈon ˈʃandor], December 25, 1941 – September 16, 2000) was a Romanian poet, essayist and politician. After the Romanian Revolution of 1989, he became a founding member and vice-president of the Christian Democratic National Peasants' Party (PNȚCD). He was elected to the Chamber of Deputies during the 1992 elections, and again in 1996 to the Senate of Romania as a senator from Arad County.

== Biography ==
Ioan Alexandru was born in Topa Mică, Cluj County. He attended from 1958 to 1962 the George Barițiu High School in Cluj, after which he enrolled in the Faculty of Philology of the University of Cluj. In 1964 he transferred to the Faculty of Romanian Language and Literature of the University of Bucharest, from which he graduated in 1968. His debut poem was published in the Tribuna magazine in 1960, but his first collection of poems was published in book form in 1964 under the title Cum să vă spun. He received a scholarship from the Humboldt Foundation in Germany (recommended by German philosopher Martin Heidegger) and studied philosophy, theology, classical philology (old Hebrew and old Greek) and art history in Freiburg, Basel, Aachen, and München. Back in Romania, Ioan Alexandru earned a doctorate in philology at the University of Bucharest in 1973. His thesis was entitled: Patria la Pindar și Eminescu ("Pindar and Eminescu's Idea of the Motherland").

On the night of December 21, 1989, the poet Ioan Alexandru held up a cross and an icon of Jesus Christ among soldiers, injured people and participants to the manifestation against Nicolae Ceaușescu's Communist regime in Bucharest, from the Piața Romană square to University Square.

His unique act that December night 1989, in the whole Eastern Bloc, his courage, his resistance under the communist regime, and his Christian testimony, all these things proved his courage during the atheist-communist regime. In recognition of his courage, the poet Ioan Alexandru received from the United States Congress the American flag Old Glory, which was on the Congress' building on August 31, 1993, in honour of Romania. Ioan Alexandru was the co-founder of the Prayer Group in the Parliament of Romania, and the founder of the Christian association "Pro-Vita" in Romania.

In 1995 he suffered a stroke, after which he lived in Germany. He died in Bonn in 2000.

== Personal ==
Ioan Alexandru was married to Ulvine, with whom he had five children.

He is buried at the Nicula Monastery, near Fizeșu Gherlii.

== Writings ==
- Cum să vă spun (poetry), 1964
- Viața, deocamdată (poetry), 1965
- Infernul discutabil (poetry), 1967
- Vămile pustiei (poetry), 1969
- Vina (poetry), (1967);
- Poeme (poetry), (1970);
- Imnele bucuriei (poetry), (1973);
- Gramatica limbii ebraice vechi (1975)
- Imnele Transilvaniei, 1976, Imnele Transilvaniei II (poetry), (1985);
- Iubirea de patrie. Jurnal de poet (essays), I (1978),
- Iubirea de patrie. Jurnal de poet (essays), II (1985),
- Imnele Moldovei (poetry), 1980
- Poezii-Poesie (1981);
- Imnele Ţării Româneşti (poetry), 1981
- Imnele iubirii (poetry), 1983
- Imnele Putnei (poetry), 1985
- Imnele Maramureșului (poetry), 1988
- Bat clopotele în Ardeal (novel) (1991);
- Căderea zidurilor Ierihonului sau Adevărul despre Revoluţie (essays) (1993);
- Amintirea poetului (poetry), (2003);
- Lumină lină: Imne (poetry), (2004);

== Translations ==
- He translated from Pindar, Rainer Maria Rilke, and The Song of Songs.
