= Beudiu =

River in Romania

- Location within Romania

Location
- Country: Romania
- Counties: Bistrița-Năsăud County
- Villages: Sânnicoară, Țentea, Vița, Beudiu

Physical characteristics
- Mouth: Apatiu
  - location: Beudiu
  - coordinates: 47.0637°N 24.1793°E
- Length: 12 km (7.5 mi)
- Basin size: 43 km^{2} (17 sq mi)

Basin features
- Progression: Apatiu→ Meleș→ Someșul Mare→ Someș→ Tisza→ Danube→ Black Sea

The Beudiu is a left tributary of the river Apatiu in Romania. It flows into the Apatiu in the village Beudiu. Its length is 12 km (7.5 mi) and its basin size is 43 km^{2} (17 sq mi).
