= Diviciorii Mari =

- Location within Romania

Location
- Country: Romania
- Counties: Cluj County
- Villages: Diviciorii Mici, Diviciorii Mari, Târgușor

Physical characteristics
- Mouth: Fizeș
  - coordinates: 46.9973°N 24.0124°E
- Length: 9 km (5.6 mi)
- Basin size: 55 km^{2} (21 sq mi)

Basin features
- Progression: Fizeș→ Someșul Mic→ Someș→ Tisza→ Danube→ Black Sea

The Diviciorii Mari is a right tributary of the river Fizeș in Romania. It flows into the Fizeș near Fizeșu Gherlii. Its length is 9 km (5.6 mi) and its basin size is 55 km^{2} (21 sq mi).
