= Meles River =

Meles River may refer to:

- River Meles, the stream near Smyrna associated with Homer's birth and works, and a namesake of which runs through the city of İzmir, Turkey
- Meleș River, a tributary of the Someșul Mare River in Romania
