= Mociu (river) =

- Location within Romania

Location
- Country: Romania
- Counties: Cluj County
- Villages: Mociu, Legii

Physical characteristics
- Mouth: Fizeș
  - location: Geaca
  - coordinates: 46.853°N 24.086°E
- Length: 11 km (6.8 mi)
- Basin size: 44 km^{2} (17 sq mi)

Basin features
- River system: Fizeș→ Someșul Mic→ Someș→ Tisza→ Danube→ Black Sea

The Mociu is a left tributary of the river Fizeș in Romania. It flows into the Fizeș near Geaca. Its length is 11 km (6.8 mi) and its basin size is 44 km^{2} (17 sq mi).
