= Sicu (river) =

- Location within Romania

Location
- Country: Romania
- Counties: Cluj County
- Villages: Tăușeni, Coasta, Sântejude-Vale

Physical characteristics
- Mouth: Fizeș
  - location: Sântioana
  - coordinates: 46.9705°N 24.0143°E
- Length: 17 km (11 mi)
- Basin size: 89 km^{2} (34 sq mi)

Basin features
- Progression: Fizeș→ Someșul Mic→ Someș→ Tisza→ Danube→ Black Sea
- Tributaries
  - right: Sântejude

The Sicu is a tributary of the river Fizeș in Romania. It flows into the Fizeș in Sântioana. Its length is 17 km (11 mi) and its basin size is 89 km^{2} (34 sq mi). Lake Sântejude is located on this river.
