= Apatiu =

- Location within Romania

Location
- Country: Romania
- Counties: Bistrița-Năsăud County
- Villages: Jimbor, Manic, Apatiu, Chețiu, Beudiu, Nușeni

Physical characteristics
- Mouth: Meleș
  - location: Nușeni
  - coordinates: 47.0955°N 24.2017°E
- Length: 25 km (16 mi)
- Basin size: 174 km^{2} (67 sq mi)

Basin features
- Progression: Meleș→ Someșul Mare→ Someș→ Tisza→ Danube→ Black Sea
- Tributaries
  - left: Beudiu

The Apatiu is a left tributary of the river Meleș in Romania. It flows into the Meleș in Nușeni. Its length is 25 km (16 mi) and its basin size is 174 km^{2} (67 sq mi).
