= Unguraș =

Unguraș Bálványosváralja
- Commune
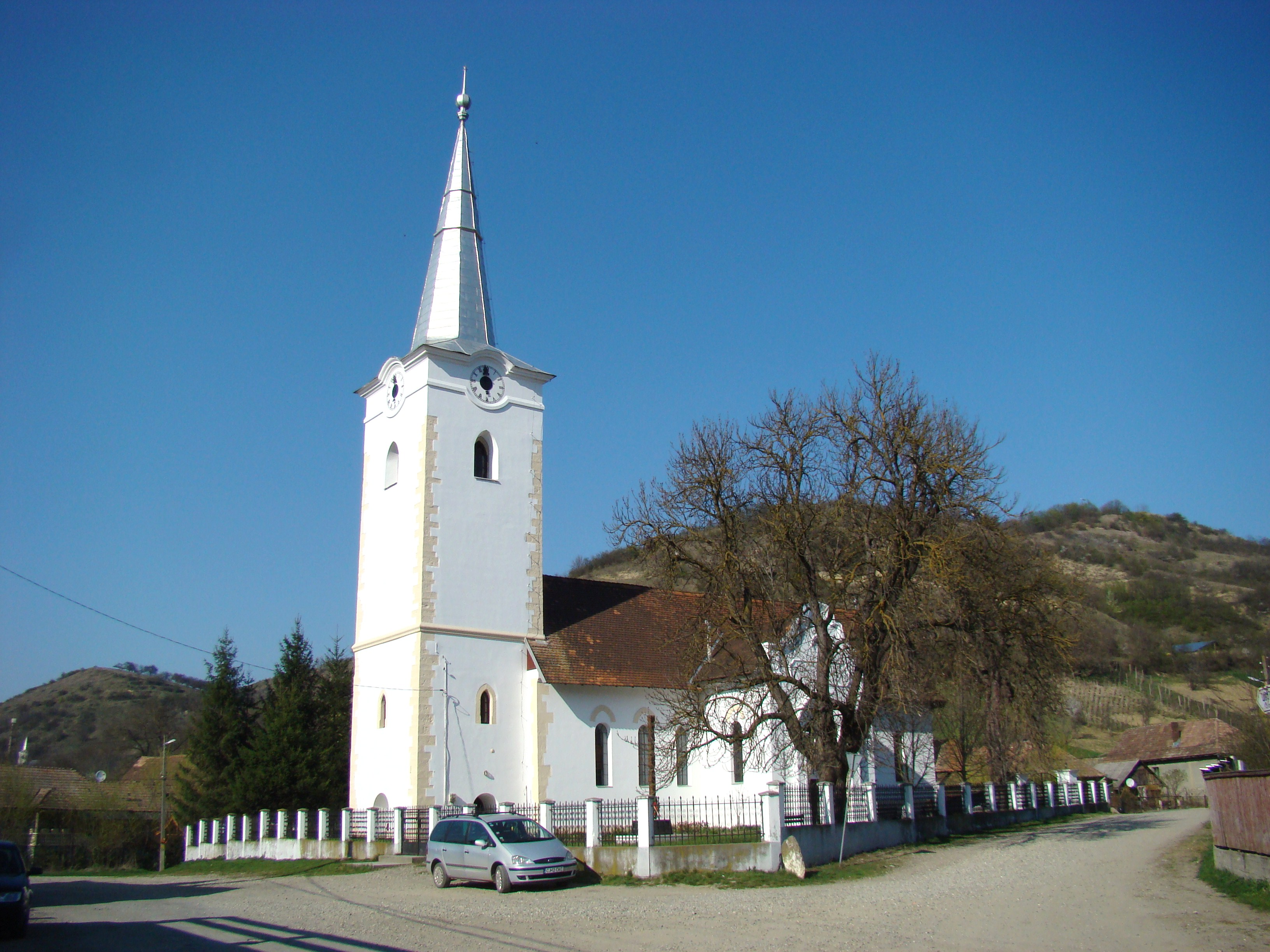
- Reformed church in Unguraș

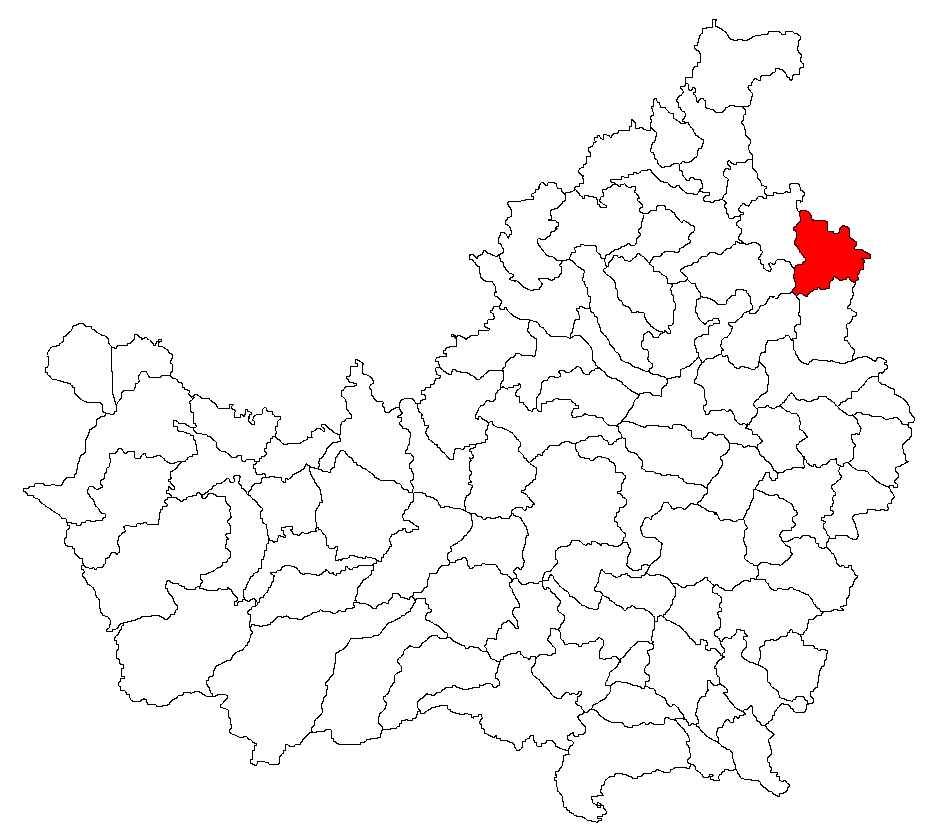
- Location in Cluj County

- Location in Romania
- Coordinates: 47°6′29.16″N 24°3′25.56″E
- Country: Romania
- County: Cluj
- Subdivisions: Batin, Daroț, Sicfa, Unguraș, Valea Ungurașului

Government
  - Mayor (2020–2024): Ildikó Mureșan (UDMR)
- Area: 63.62 km^{2} (24.56 sq mi)
- Elevation: 281 m (922 ft)
- Population (2021-12-01): 2,443
  - Density: 38.40/km^{2} (99.46/sq mi)
- Time zone: UTC+02:00 (EET)
  - Summer (DST): UTC+03:00 (EEST)
- Postal code: 407570
- Area code: +(40) x64
- Vehicle reg.: CJ
- Website: www.comunaunguras.ro

Unguraș (Hungarian: Bálványosváralja) is a commune in Cluj County, Transylvania, Romania. It is composed of five villages: Batin (Bátony), Daroț (Daróc), Sicfa (Székfa), Unguraș, and Valea Ungurașului (Csabaújfalu).

== Geography ==
The commune lies on the Transylvanian Plateau, on the banks of the river Bandău, a right tributary of the Someșul Mic. It is located in the northeastern part of the county, on the border with Bistrița-Năsăud County, at a distance of 18 km (11 mi) from the city of Dej and 78 km (48 mi) from the county seat, Cluj-Napoca.

Unguraș borders the following communes: Braniștea to the north, Nușeni to the east (both in Bistrița-Năsăud County), Sânmartin to the south, and Mintiu Gherlii and Mica to the west (the last three in Cluj County). The commune is crossed by county road DJ161D, which starts in Valea Ungurașului and ends in Dej.

== The Unguraș Fortress ==
The Unguraș Fortress was built after the Mongol invasion of 1241–1242, and was first attested in 1269. The ruins of the fortress (listed as monument istoric) are located on top of the nearby Fortress Hill; a small monument has been placed there in 1996.

== Demographics ==
At the 2011 census, the commune had 2,777 inhabitants, of which 61.5% were Hungarians, 35.7% Romanians, and 1.5% Roma. At the 2021 census, Unguraș had a population of 2,443; of those, 59.72% were Hungarians, 35.69% Romanians, and 2.37% Roma.

== Natives ==
- Ioan Oltean (born 1953), lawyer and politician
