= Sânnicoară =

Sânnicoară may refer to several villages in Romania:

- Sânnicoară, a village in Chiochiș Commune, Bistrița-Năsăud County
- Sânnicoară, a village in Apahida Commune, Cluj County
