= Feketelak =

Feketelak is the Hungarian name for two villages in Romania:

- Lacu village, Geaca Commune, Cluj County
- Negrenii de Câmpie village, Band Commune, Mureș County
