= Bandău =

Bandău Unguraș
- Location within Romania

Location
- Country: Romania
- Counties: Cluj County
- Villages: Unguraș, Nireș

Physical characteristics
- Mouth: Someșul Mic
  - location: Mica
  - coordinates: 47.1356°N 23.9169°E
- Length: 27 km (17 mi)
- Basin size: 135 km^{2} (52 sq mi)

Basin features
- Progression: Someșul Mic→ Someș→ Tisza→ Danube→ Black Sea

The Bandău (also: Unguraș) is a right tributary of the river Someșul Mic in Romania. It discharges into the Someșul Mic in Mica. Its length is 27 km (17 mi) and its basin size is 135 km^{2} (52 sq mi).
