= Hosu =

Hosu may refer to:

- Hōsu District, Ishikawa, a district in Japan
- Hosu (Fizeș), a river in Cluj County, Romania
- N-Hydroxysuccinimide, a chemical reagent
