= Lunkatanya =

Lunkatanya is the Hungarian name for two villages in Romania:

- Lunca Meteşului village, Meteș Commune, Alba County
- Valea Luncii village, Mica Commune, Cluj County
