= Jimbor =

Jimbor may refer to several villages in Romania:

- Jimbor, a village in Chiochiș Commune, Bistriţa-Năsăud County
- Jimbor, a village in Homorod Commune, Braşov County
