= Chiriș =

- Location within Romania

Location
- Country: Romania
- Counties: Cluj County
- Villages: Chiriș

Physical characteristics
- Mouth: Fizeș
  - location: Sucutard
  - coordinates: 46.886°N 24.075°E
- Length: 12 km (7.5 mi)
- Basin size: 58 km^{2} (22 sq mi)

Basin features
- Progression: Fizeș→ Someșul Mic→ Someș→ Tisza→ Danube→ Black Sea

The Chiriș is a left tributary of the river Fizeș in Romania. It flows into the Fizeș near Sucutard. Its length is 12 km (7.5 mi) and its basin size is 58 km^{2} (22 sq mi).
