= Ioan Oltean =

Romanian lawyer and politician

Ioan Oltean (born April 20, 1953) is a Romanian lawyer and politician. A member of the Democratic Liberal Party (PD-L), he was a member of the Romanian Chamber of Deputies for Bistrița-Năsăud County from 1990 to 1992 and from 1996 to 2016. Oltean also held the position of Minister of Water, Forests and Environment from 1996 to 1997 in the Victor Ciorbea cabinet.

== Biography ==
Born in Valea Ungurașului, Cluj County, Oltean graduated from a pedagogical high school in Cluj in 1974 and worked as a primary school teacher in Bistrița from that year until 1986. Between 1981 and 1986, he attended the Law faculty of Babeș-Bolyai University. Upon graduation, he worked as a lawyer for the Bistrița-Năsăud union of professional cooperatives until 1990. From January to April 1990, subsequent to the fall of the communist regime, he was a union leader at the cooperative organization. Entering the National Salvation Front (FSN) and elected to parliament that spring, he served on the Chamber of Deputies's judiciary committee while in office. He was also secretary of the FSN's Bistrița-Năsăud chapter until this became the Democratic Party (PD), and he has headed the county party chapter since 1994. Between 1992 and 1996, he was legal adviser to the president of the Bistrița-Năsăud County Council.

Returned to the legislature in 1996, he served as Environment Minister for the following year, while in the Chamber, he was on the public administration, human rights and judicial committees. Following his re-election in 2000, he became president of the public administration committee for the duration of the legislature. Elected again in 2004, he served as the Chamber's quaestor from that time until September 2007, when he became one of its vice presidents, holding the position for the following year, during which the PD transformed itself into the PD-L. He continued on the public administration committee as well. After the 2008 election, he was returned as Chamber vice president and to the public administration committee. At the 2012 election, he placed second in his district, but won another term through the redistribution mechanism specified by the electoral law. Subsequently, he became a vice president of the Chamber and continued on the public administration committee.

Within his party, he has been a vice president (2001-2011) and secretary general (May–June 2011). He left the latter position following the PD-L's defeat in the 2012 local election. He is a knight of the National Order of Faithful Service, awarded by the President of Romania. Oltean has one child; his wife died in 2017.
