= Palatka Gypsy Band =

Romanian folk group

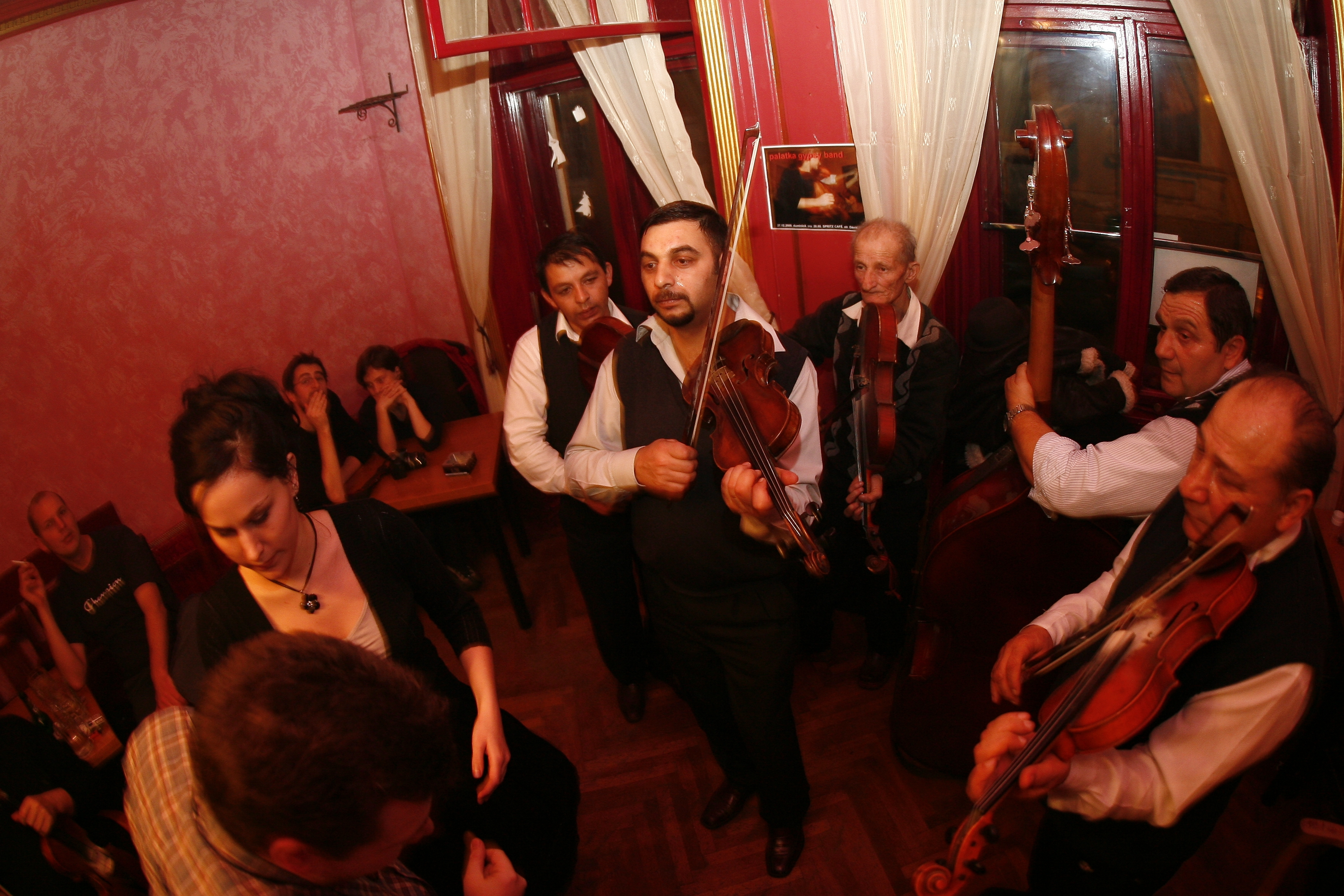
- Palatka Gypsy Band in 2009 (L–R): Remus, Florin, Ştefan, Nelu, Lőrincz

Background information
- Origin: Pălatca, Romania
- Genres: Folk music
- Years active: 2006–present
- Labels: Fono
- Members: Martin Codoba; Laurenţiu Codoba; Ştefan Moldovan; Mihai Radac; Ion Boldi
- Past members: Martin Covaci; Mircea Covaci; Ignat Matingo

Palatka Gypsy Band is a folk band formed by five musicians from the Transylvanian village of Pălatca (Hungarian: Magyarpalatka or Palatka), Cluj County, Romania, led by the first violin Florin Codoba.

== Name ==
The group was originally named by Raoul Weiss and Lóránd Boros for concerts held between 2006 and 2008 at Café Aux Anges (a concert venue in Cluj-Napoca, Romania managed by Raoul Weiss), following the widespread use of this phrase in the English-speaking folk community in Budapest and in Hungarian diaspora, e.g. in Bob Cohen's online contributions to the study and promotion of this peculiar music.

== Pălatca ==
Pălatca is a Transylvanian village 20 miles northeast of Cluj-Napoca. Today most of its inhabitants speak Romanian as their main language; once predominant, the Hungarian speaking community is still present, as well as a large Gypsy minority, once trilingual (Romani-Hungarian-Romanian), nowadays speaking predominantly Romanian.

In ethno-musical studies, and for the Hungarian folk revival movement called Táncház-Mozgalom, mostly due to the activity and talent of the musicians of this local Gypsy community, Pălatca is seen as the epicentre, the main source, and very symbol of traditional music and dance of this ethnographic region, called Mezőség (Romanian: Câmpia Transilvaniei). Mezőség is the name for the mostly rural hilly area of central Transylvania that lies between the cities of Cluj-Napoca, Turda, Târgu-Mureş, Bistriţa, Beclean, and Gherla.

Until the second half of the 20th century, most of the (approximately) 300 Hungarian, Romanian, German and mixed communities of the Mezőség region had their own distinct bands; during the second half of the 20th century, the introduction of mass-culture habits in that rural area stripped the traditional audiences away from those musicians, and with it the revenue derived from providing music for social festivities (weddings, traditional holidays, etc.). As a consequence, the Pălatca Gypsy musicians were compelled to find work in a circle of communities beyond their own, extending from Pălatca and its direct surroundings into a larger part of central and northern Mezőség. In the process, these musicians learned the distinguishing songs and dance music found in that broader area, becoming for instance the primary music providers of villages as far as Vişea (6 miles west of Pălatca).

The dances of the Mezőség area are rich and highly developed, with the accompanying music being the combined result of many diverse influences. The dance and music of the Transylvanian Baroque and Renaissance periods were preserved and gradually developed into a unique style in this area of Transylvania. The “New Style” from Hungary and other foreign, aristocratic influences did not arrive until much later (and then were only selectively integrated). The interweaving and intermingling of Hungarian, Romanian, Gypsy and Transylvania-German cultures here has resulted in raising the dance and music to the highest levels. The outcome of the constant interchange of the dance and dance melodies is that, in the Mezőség, the Hungarian and Romanian characteristics have become intertwined; the borderlines between the two have melted away, producing a truly bilingual effect.

== The musicians ==
The first documentation of Gypsy peoples inhabiting Transylvania dates to the year 1568. During the period spanning between the 16th and 18th centuries, they merged into the musical tradition of their environment. Gypsy bands became common in Hungary in the second half of the 18th century.

The Gypsy musicians from Pălatca are so-called Transylvanian-Hungarian Gypsies. Most of them no longer speak Hungarian, but have remained Protestant (the religion of the Hungarians in that area of Transylvania), and often bear Hungarian names. Since the 1950s, when the traditional dance-life of the area’s villages began to decline, they became unable to support themselves financially through music. Hence, they have been forced to seek other jobs or to perform migrant labour. (By the end of the 1970s, many members of the Pălatca Gypsy musical families were working as garbage collectors in Cluj-Napoca.)

They were rediscovered in the 1970s by ethno-musicology and the newborn Táncház movement, which provided them a new, mostly urban, public in cities of the former Hungarian Kingdom (such as Budapest, Debrecen, and Cluj). This folk-revival environment helped the more educated members of the community to obtain an awareness of the value of musical tradition and authenticity, and therefore to resist the growing trend of fashionable “Gypsy Music” (a music based on the commercial myth of an essentially unique “Gypsy Music” spanning from India to Spain).

== Musical style ==
The complete band consists of 2 prímás (the prímás, [ˈpriːmaːʃ], is the lead fiddle in these village bands), 2 violas (locally called kontra or brácsa [ˈbraːt͡ʃɒ]), and a double bass (known as nagybőgő in Hungarian). Bands using newer instruments such as the clarinet or accordion (which are common in other areas of Transylvania) remain unfashionable in the environs of Palatka.

Characteristic of the playing style of the prímás is the technique of holding the violin by resting it against their left wrist; they rarely play on open strings, with the fourth finger used only for melismas, and change position frequently. The two prímás-es often play in parallel octaves. The violas account for the density of the accompaniment. The curve on the bridge of the viola is flattened so that the strings can be sounded simultaneously. Mostly major triads are played. The double bass is altered by replacing the bottom E string with the A string, centering the D string across the nut, fingerboard, bridge and tailpiece and leaving the G string in its original position. Although it now has only three gut strings (as is the convention in other areas of Transylvania and Hungary), only the A string is played, which is tuned up a minor third to a C played across an octave. Factory made bows are only used by the prímás-es, the viola and bass players use more massive home-made bows. It is common here, as generally in more traditional areas of the Carpathian Basin, for instrumental and vocal melody line not to conform to the system of equal temperament, as the musicians themselves generally do not read music (nor think within this system). This is why the signs ↑ or ↓ often appear above the notes in transcription of such folk music.

Whereas the above characteristics are common to most Mezőség musical traditions, the following are quite typical of Palatka:

- They tune their instruments higher than the usual, to achieve a more penetrating sound.
- While performing, the musicians generally stand very close to one another, as (when playing without amplification) this is the best way of keeping the playing unified in spite of its loudness.

These features, joined to the dominance of major chords in central Mezőség music, are some of the elements that give the very distinctive “Palatka Sound” a kind of “rock'n'roll” appeal not very common in folk music, and making it able to win over, year after year, new generations of listeners outside the traditional circle of folk amateurs.

== Melodies and dances ==
Melodies—all of Transylvanian type—fall into two groups: those exclusively instrumental, and those that have a sung form.

- 1. group
  - fast and slow legényes (men's dance)
  - "leaping" couple dance (generally played between slow and fast csárdás)
  - tîrnoveana or korcsos (a men's dance)
- 2. group
  - foursome dance
  - slow, so-called "Gypsy", couple dance
  - slow and fast csárdás (couple) dance
  - table (listening) songs

While Hungarians and Romanians generally know the lyrics of the melodies, the Romani musicians generally do not; as they were not expected to sing at the parties they were engaged to perform at (vocal music being considered the "noble part" of music in most traditional societies).

By tradition, a single dance is not performed in isolation from its repertoire, as the customary dance set is, rather, a suite of dances performed in a fixed order. The dance suite lasts for half an hour to an hour, consists of three to five dances, with short breaks, danced with the same partner from start to finish. This is the largest functional unit of dance and music within traditional dance events of the area. During the course of such an event, this cycle is repeated time and again with little variation. There is a gradual building up within the cycle. The local Hungarian expression for the dance cycle is "egy pár tánc", a subtle play on words that can be translated either as, "a couple’s dance," "a couple (of) dances," or "a few dances." In Palatka, as in most places in the Carpathian Basin, the order of dances in the cycle is fairly uniform: a fast men's dance, followed by slow couple dance, and finally fast couple’s dances.

== The band ==
As one of the very few remaining expressions of Palatka Music, the Palatka Gypsy Band can be considered the last avatar of a centuries-old tradition. But this is precisely where the distinction lies: within the táncház-revival, little or no emphasis has been laid on artistic personalities among vernacular musicians: in spite of growing integration into an international and commercial performing pattern (nowadays, vernacular folk musicians from Transylvania tend to earn more from non-traditional performances, held in cities, or in summer camps organized in rural locations of the area, but generally not for locals), their (mostly improvised) management tended to treat them as ethnological “hold-outs,” which is partly in keeping with the idea some of those musicians have of themselves, but ultimately risks freezing their reputation and activity within the diminutive frame of a relatively small group of folk aficionados, which is unable to sustain a number of events and/or a level of remuneration sufficient to guarantee the future of those bands and, therefore, the survival of their musical traditions. In other words: under-marketing the artists for the sake of authenticity might prove to bring the opposite result: seeing even more folk musicians migrate towards mass-market genres, or abandoning music altogether for more gainful occupations.

This is why the creators of the Palatka Gypsy Band “brand”, Raoul Weiss and Lóránd Boros, decided to switch to a more realistic management approach, marketing the band by contemporary means to deliver its music to a broader public: advertising through designed posters, multilingual presentation texts, website etc., introducing the individual musicians with all the attributes of professional performing artists (artistic and civil name, photographs) – and educating the musicians as to modern practices of show-business (written contracts, regular fees, etc.).

1st violin: FLORIN, officially Martin CODOBA was born in 1977. In the early 1990s, his musician father MARCI (Martin CODOBA sr.) was successful enough to be able to send him to music school in Cluj-Napoca; this is why Florin is one of the few Pălatca Gypsies with a double musical culture, being equally at home in vernacular and in written music. After completing music school in Cluj-Napoca, his father offered to pay for further studies at the Music Conservatory. This would have meant intensive training in classical music and acquiring a social status hardly compatible with the Gypsy routine of playing at peasant weddings, funerals etc.. Florin, while very grateful for the opportunity, nevertheless told his father he preferred to keep playing with his family and learning Palatka music from him and his uncle Béla. And so he did. In the early 2000s, after the death of Marci and Béla, Florin, already a star of the folk scene, inherited the throne of the Codoba fiddle dynasty. His 3-year-old son, Martin Codoba III, already owns a small-sized violin.

Florin Codoba
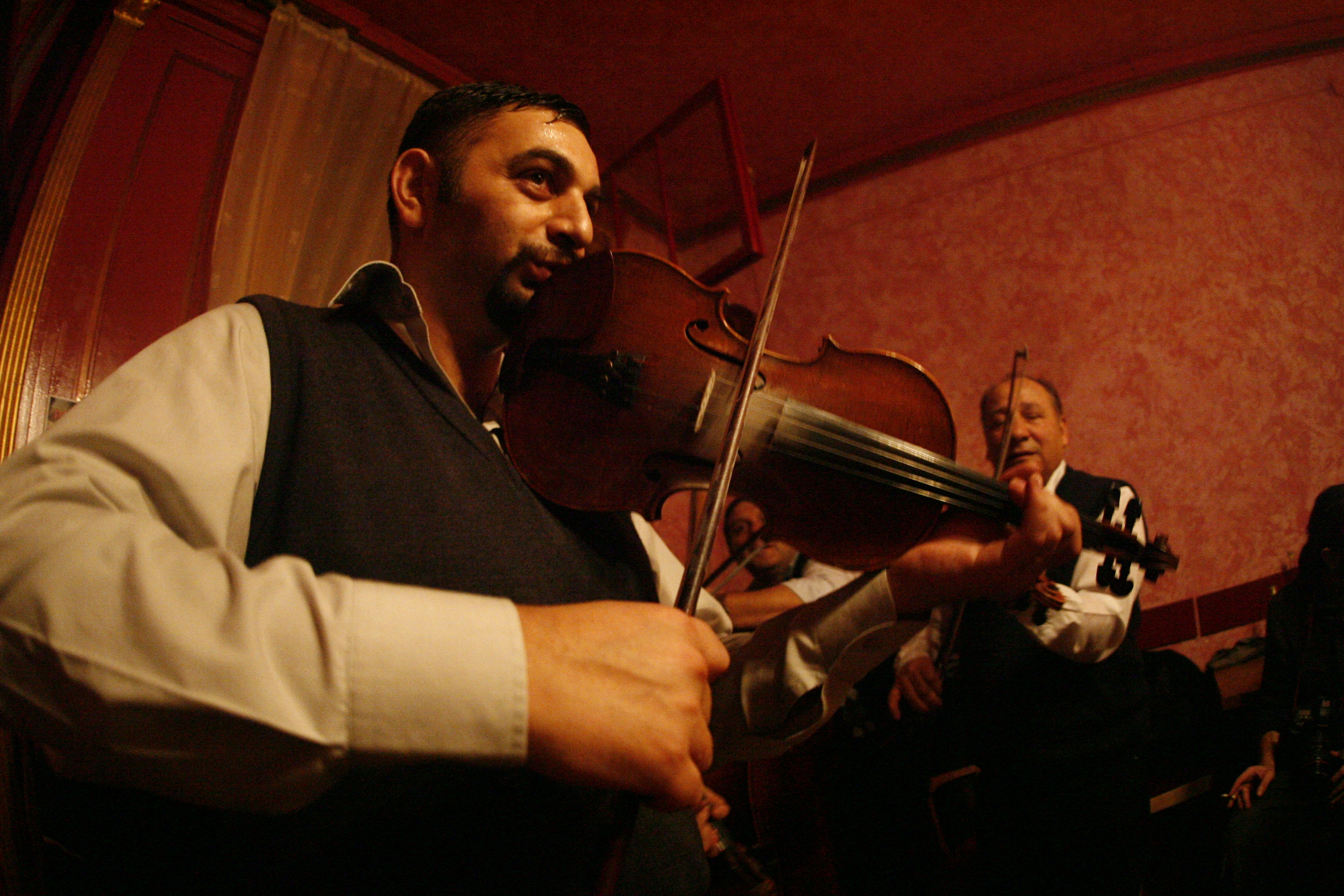

Background information
- Also known as: Florin
- Born: Martin Codoba; Cluj, Romania
- Occupation: musician
- Instrument: Violin

Having learnt Romani and Romanian at home, long stays in Hungary during his youth and, later on, an intensive concert routine there, gave him the occasion to become (unlike his fellow musicians) fluent in Hungarian as well. He is the only member of the band who chiefly resides in an urban centre (Cluj). His higher educational level allowed him to develop a keen understanding of the values contained in the cultural heritage of his family and village community, so that Florin can reasonably be described as a folk purist. His style (particularly his sense of rhythm) is further influenced by his exceptional dancing skills. He already performed in Australia (http://www.kulcha.com.au/0601/index.html), Canada, Finland, the Baltic States, Germany, the Netherlands, France, Italy, Serbia and Slovakia.

2nd violin: LŐRINCZ, officially Laurenţiu CODOBA, Florin’s uncle, was born in 1947. Seniority (a very important value in Gypsy communities) allows him to share the leadership with his nephew; it is generally admitted that, whereas Florin is the leader in the city and the outside world, Lőrincz is the boss at home in Pălatca. Experience, a huge repertoire, and much complicity with his public are some of Lőrincz’s most appreciated artistic qualities. For some of the concerts held at Aux Anges, he shared this position with Ignat “Náci” Matingo, a more versatile fiddler, now prímás in the other Palatka band.

1st viola: ŞTEFAN, officially Ştefan MOLDOVAN, was born in 1943, is the senior kontrás (Hungarian name of the musician playing kontra, i.e. viola) of Palatka, and the oldest active musician of the community. In recognition of his expertise, each year he is a kontra instructor at the Mezőség Summer Camp organized by the Kallós Zoltán Foundation (http://www.kallos.org.ro/joomla/) in Răscruci (Hungarian: Válaszút), whereas the fiddle play is generally taught by Florin (https://www.youtube.com/watch?v=4-K2qrfXhqQ). Once a very good dancer, at the age of sixty-six he still indulges, from time to time, in short dance performances to please his public. After the bass-player Martin “Puki” Covaci retired due to hand paralysis, he remained the only musician left from the mythical band that Marci and Béla Codoba led until the end of the 1990s.

2nd viola: REMUS, officially Mihai RADAC, was born in 1977, the son of another Palatka musical dynasty, the Radacs (or, on some documents, Rádák, according to a Hungarian orthography). Florin, Ştefan and Remus have played on all concerts held by the band under the Palatka Gypsy Band brand.

Bass: NELU, officially Ioan BOLDI, was born in 1954; an experienced bass player, he is nevertheless a newcomer in the band, which he joined after Mircea Covaci (Puki’s son) left the band to accept a better-paying job in turkey farming.

== Concerts and tours ==
Nowadays, the PGB is starring on a monthly basis at Fonó, a major folk venue in Budapest (http://www.fono.hu/), for dance evenings (táncház), enjoying great popularity Less regularly, they also perform at Gödör (http://www.godorklub.hu/), a mainstream pop-rock venue in the city center of Budapest. In Hungary the PGB also performed at the country's most famous pop event, the Sziget festival

Notable international tours include:

- winter/spring 2006, Netherlands (Utrecht, Amsterdam, Wageningen, Losdorp, Zutphen), Belgium (Brüssel) Germany (Münster, Hamburg, Wuppertal, Stuttgart, München)
- Fall 2009, Germany (München, Hannover, Hamburg, Berlin, Göttingen)
- Summer 2009, Italy
- Fall 2012 Germany (Hamburg, Berlin, Mainz, München)
- Fall 2016 Germany/Netherlands/Austria (Nürnberg, München, Berlin, Hamburg, Amsterdam, Nijmegen, Austerlitz, Utrecht, Zutphen, Losdorp, Karlsruhe, Freiburg im Breisgau, Frankfurt, Heidelberg, Wien) https://www.folktranssylvania.net/tour-2016/
- Fall 2017 Germany (Freiburg, Heidelberg, München, Berlin)
- Fall 2018 Austria/Germany (Wien, Freiburg, München, Heidelberg, Bad Honnef, Hamburg)

== Discography ==
Three recordings, published by Fonó Records between 1984 and 2004, were made with the older prímás generation (now deceased):

- Esküvő Magyarpalatkán 1984-ben ("a wedding in Palatka in 1984"),
- Magyarpalatka 2 CD (a compilation also including Hungarian folksongs of the area), 1996,
- Esküvő Mezőkeszűen ("a wedding in Keszű"), 2004.
- 2016 "Palatkai Banda - Village music from Magyarpalatka" https://www.folktranssylvania.net/new-cd/

Since then, already with Florin Codoba in charge, many other "informal" sound and video recordings have been made and commercialized either on a local basis or by Japanese folk music researchers; the latter might be available in Japan. Unfortunately, they do not seem to be available online.
