= Hosu (Fizeș) =

Tributary in Cluj County, Romania

- Location within Romania

Location
- Country: Romania
- Counties: Cluj County
- Villages: Săcălaia, Bonț, Nicula

Physical characteristics
- Mouth: Fizeș
  - location: near Gherla
  - coordinates: 47.0306°N 23.9346°E
- Length: 13 km (8.1 mi)
- Basin size: 46 km^{2} (18 sq mi)

Basin features
- Progression: Fizeș→ Someșul Mic→ Someș→ Tisza→ Danube→ Black Sea

The Hosu is a left tributary of the river Fizeș in Romania. It flows into the Fizeș near Gherla. Its length is 13 km (8.1 mi) and its basin size is 46 km^{2} (18 sq mi).
