= Dumitru Sigmirean =

Romanian footballer

Personal information
- Date of birth: 6 January 1959
- Place of birth: Nuşeni, Romania
- Date of death: 12 November 2013 (aged 54)
- Place of death: Nuşeni, Romania
- Position: Midfielder

Youth career
- 1972–1975: Șomeșul Beclean

Senior career*
Years	Team	Apps	(Gls)
1975–1980	Gloria Bistrița		
1980–1981	Argeș Pitești		
1981–1982	Olt Scornicești		
1982–1985	Politehnica Iași		
1985–1988	Gloria Bistrița		

Managerial career
- Laminorul Beclean
- * Club domestic league appearances and goals

Dumitru Sigmirean (6 January 1959 – 12 November 2013) was a Romanian footballer, who primarily played as a midfielder.

== Death ==
Sigmirean died of lung cancer on 12 November 2013, aged 54, in his hometown of Nuşeni, Bistrița-Năsăud County.
