= Nicula Monastery =

Pilgrim place

Coordinates: 47°00′07″N 23°57′23″E

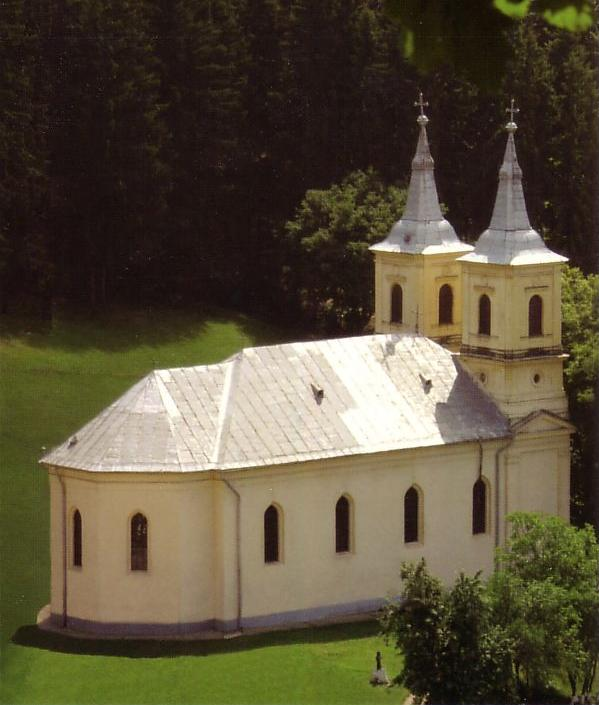

Nicula Monastery is an important pilgrimage center in the north of Transylvania. It is located in Nicula village, Cluj County, in the vicinity of Gherla.

An unconfirmed tradition holds that the monastery was established in the 14th century. The first documentary mention dates to 1552, when it was an Eastern Orthodox site. A 1659 reference notes that the monastery was vacant. It became Greek-Catholic at the end of the 18th century, just after the creation of that church, and was dedicated to Saint Nicholas. A radical restructuring took place in the same period, as attested by a wooden church from 1695, an iconostasis from 1694 and a bell from 1696.

An old place of Greek-Catholic pilgrimage, the church of the monastery housed over time the famous icon painted in 1681 by the artisan Luca of Iclod. According to a report by Austrian officers, the icon had been shedding tears between February 15 and March 12, 1699. In 1713 Transylvanian Governor Sigismund Kornis took the icon to the noble residence at Kornis Castle in Benediugu Dejului, from where it reached Cluj.

== History ==
Pope Clement XIII granted in 1767 plenary indulgence to the Greek-Catholic pilgrims who were traveling to the Monastery of village Nicula during the Marian feasts of August 15 (Assumption of the Mother of God) and September 8 (Nativity of the Mother of God). In 1774, a single monk lived there. The stone church of the monastery was built next to the previously built wooden church, between 1875 and 1879, at the expense of the Gherla Diocese. Two spires of 25 meters were added in 1905. In 1928 Pope Pius XI granted this Greek-Catholic monastic sanctuary the status of Marian Sanctuary. The iconostasis was replaced in 1938, the furnishings date to 1913, the walls were repaired in 1925 and a summer altar was built in 1925. There is an 1899 guesthouse, a space for pilgrims (1913-1920, 1927) and a monks' residence (1926). The wooden church burned in 1973, and another one was brought in, dating to the 18th century.

Through the school of artisans of icons from Nicula Monastery, Transylvania entered the glass painting technique, originated in Bohemia, Austria and Bavaria, areas where the tradition of glass manufactures was intertwined with the popular Catholic religiosity.

In 1948, when the Greek-Catholic Church was outlawed by the nascent communist regime, the monastery was confiscated by the authorities and transferred to the Romanian Orthodox Church, which continues to own and use it.
