= Ioan Chezan =

Romanian musician and conductor

Ioan Chezan (born 14 August 1945) is a Romanian musician, flutist, and conductor.

== Biography ==
He was born in 1945 in Sântejude, Cluj County, the youngest of three boys of the family. He attended school first in Gherla and then in Cluj. He attended secondary school at Petru Maior High School in Gherla, where he studied music with Tiberiu Coste between 1957 and 1959. He then studied music with the noted musician Marius Cuteanu between 1959 and 1965. He later met professor Bella Torok (the first flutist of the Hungarian Opera in Cluj), and studied flute with him. Conducting attracted him after entering the Gheorghe Dima Music Academy where he was a student of the great master conductor Dorin Pop. During his student days he had a real pleiad of great musicians and professors: Iuliu Silaghi and Constantin Rîpă for solfeggio and dictation; Vasile Herman for musical form; Rodica Pop and Gheorghe Merișescu for music history; Dorin Pop and Florentin Mihăescu for choir and conducting; Ioan Husti for music theory; Dan Voiculescu at choral arrangements; Dieter Aker and Tudor Jarda for harmony; Erwin Junger for reading the music scores; Gabriela Țereanu for piano and Sigusmund Toduță and Liviu Comes as rectors. Without a doubt he lived a period of flourishing of the Romanian superior musical education.

After graduating from the Conservatory, he began his teaching career in the fall of 1970 at Pedagogic Highschool in Zalău. Ioan Chezan established in 1971, the first school of music in the same city, and later, after 34 years, he transformed that school into the so-called „Ioan Sima" Music High School. Ioan Chezan led both schools, as director, until 2009 when he retired.

In 2004 he received the Order of "Merit for Education" rank of Chevalier.

In 2008 he defended the Ph.D. thesis having the title „Profesionalismul corului de cameră cu statut de ansamblu amator" (The professionalism of the chamber choir with the amateur ensemble status) coordinated by professor Valentin Timaru.
