= Nușeni =

Nușeni Apanagyfalu
- Commune
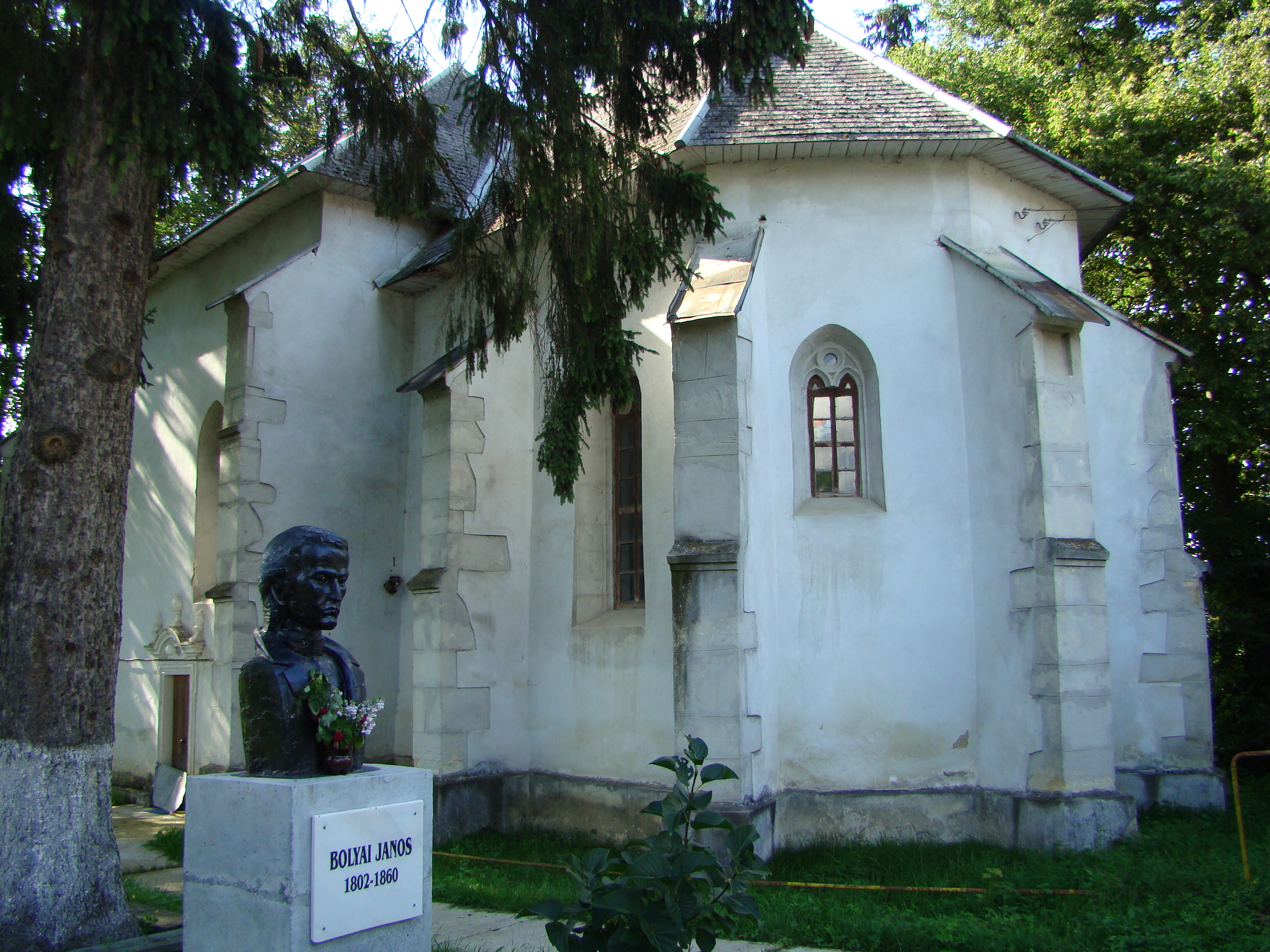
- Bust of János Bolyai next to the Reformed church from Nușeni

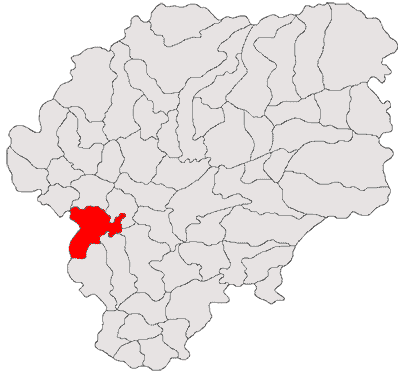
- Location in Bistrița-Năsăud County

- Location in Romania
- Coordinates: 47°6′N 24°12′E
- Country: Romania
- County: Bistrița-Năsăud

Government
  - Mayor (2020–2024): Ioan Mureșan (PNL)
- Area: 92.04 km^{2} (35.54 sq mi)
- Elevation: 290 m (950 ft)
- Population (2021-12-01): 2,814
  - Density: 30.57/km^{2} (79.19/sq mi)
- Time zone: UTC+02:00 (EET)
  - Summer (DST): UTC+03:00 (EEST)
- Postal code: 427200
- Area code: +40 x63
- Vehicle reg.: BN
- Website: comunanuseni.ro

Nușeni (Hungarian: Apanagyfalu; German: Großendorf; Transylvanian Saxon: Grussndref) is a commune in Bistrița-Năsăud County, Transylvania, Romania.

It is composed of seven villages: Beudiu (Bőd), Dumbrava (Nyírmezőtanya), Feleac (Fellak, Szászfellak; German: Falk), Malin (Almásmálom, formerly Málom), Nușeni, Rusu de Sus (Felsőoroszfalu), and Vița (Vice; German: Witzen or Witzau).

The commune lies on the Transylvanian Plateau, on the banks of the river Meleș, a left tributary of the river Someșul Mare. It is located in the southwestern part of the county, on the border with Cluj County, at a distance of 10 km (6.2 mi) from the town of Beclean and 34 km (21 mi) from the county seat, Bistrița.

Nușeni's neighbors are the town of Beclean to the north, Unguraș commune in Cluj County to the west, Chiochiș commune to the south, Matei and Lechința communes to the southeast, and Șieu-Odorhei commune to the east.

At the 2011 census, 74.4% of inhabitants were Romanians, 25% Hungarians, and 0.5% Roma.

== Natives ==
- Dumitru Sigmirean
