= Kornis Castle =

- Romanian: Castelul Kornis; Hungarian: Kornis-kastély
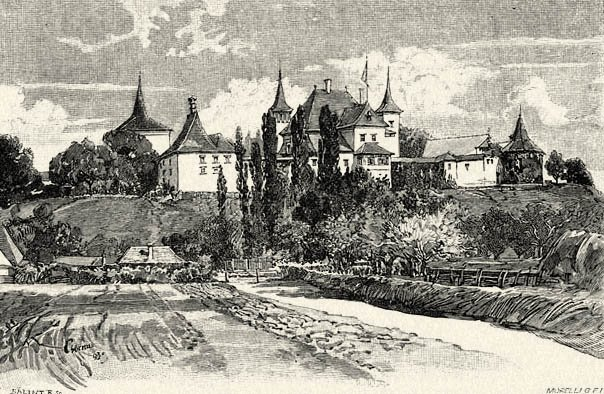
- Kornis Castle, vintage engraving

- Location within Romania

General information
- Architectural style: Renaissance
- Location: Mănăstirea, Cluj County, Romania
- Coordinates: 47°07′06.7″N 23°55′15.9″E
- Construction started: 1573
- Completed: 1593

Design and construction
- Architect: Kristof Kereszturi

Kornis Castle is a castle begun in the 16th century and located in Mănăstirea village, Cluj County, Romania. It is listed as a historic monument by the country's Culture Ministry.

== History ==
The main building was built by Kristóf Keresztúri between 1573 and 1593 in the Renaissance style. Over time, the castle was filled with secondary buildings in a quadrilaterally shaped enclosure. After the domain became the property of the Kornis family around 1673, Kornis Gaspar (1641–1683) raised the second floor of the main building on the south side.

In 1680, his son, Zsigmond Kornis, renovated the castle. He also repaired the castle after it was damaged during the Curuti uprising in the early 18th century and in 1720 added two new octagonal bastions on the northern side and restored the tower at the castle entrance on the west side. The tower still exists today. During this period the castle rooms were redecorated with frescoed ceilings. The wooden frame works of the top floor and staircase were added, decorated with popular motifs and decorations of Dej volcanic tuff stone were created.

During the Second World War part of the castle was destroyed and its collections were burned by the communists or stolen after nationalization. Before the destruction of the castle, the library contained 9,000 volumes, consisting of collections of rare books. It was destroyed together with the extensive natural history collection. The pavilions are now used as a silo, hostel and cultural school destinations.

After 1944, only part of the masonry was rebuilt in 1975-76 and Kornis chapel was taken over by the Romanian Orthodox Church. But there was no serious restoration of the castle and the domain, leaving the castle in ruins today. The castle is known for the statues of two unicorns which guarded the entry until recently, when they were removed after a failed burglary attempt.

== Photo gallery ==
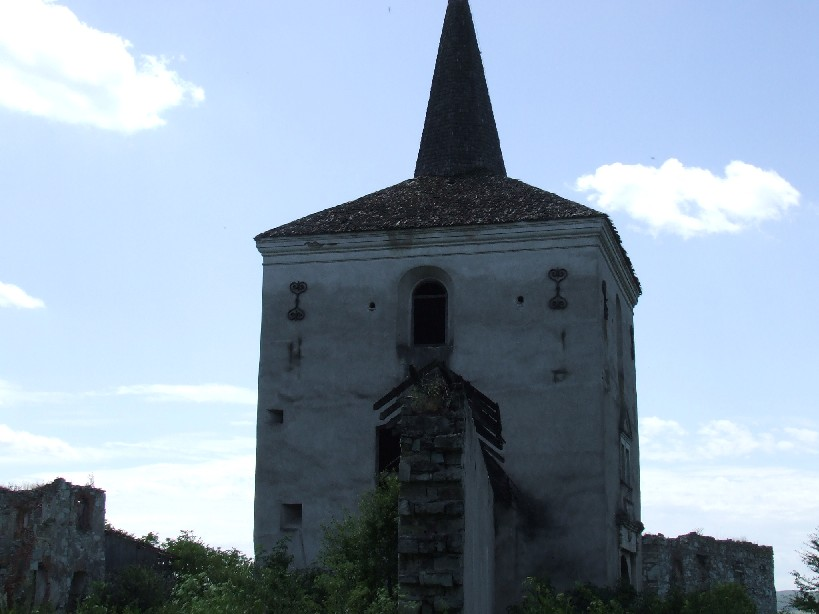
Tower entrance

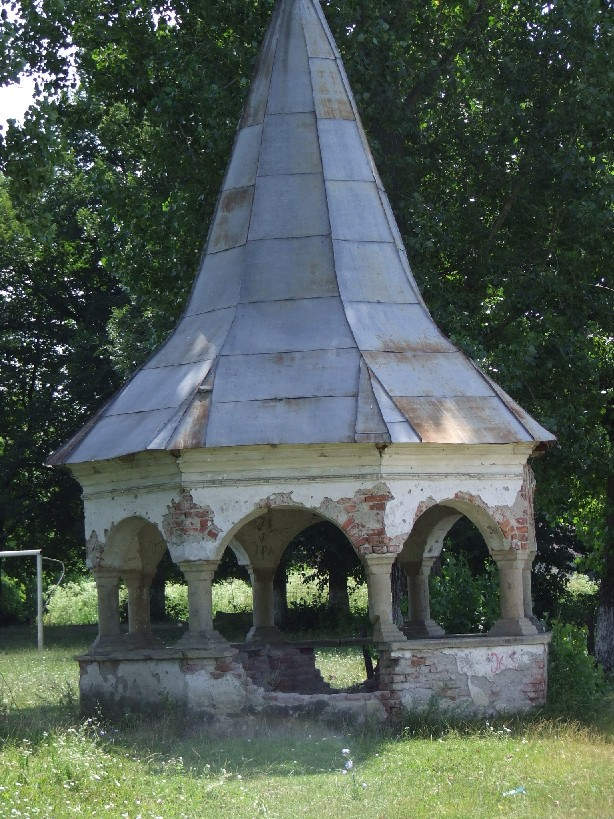
Octagonal fountain

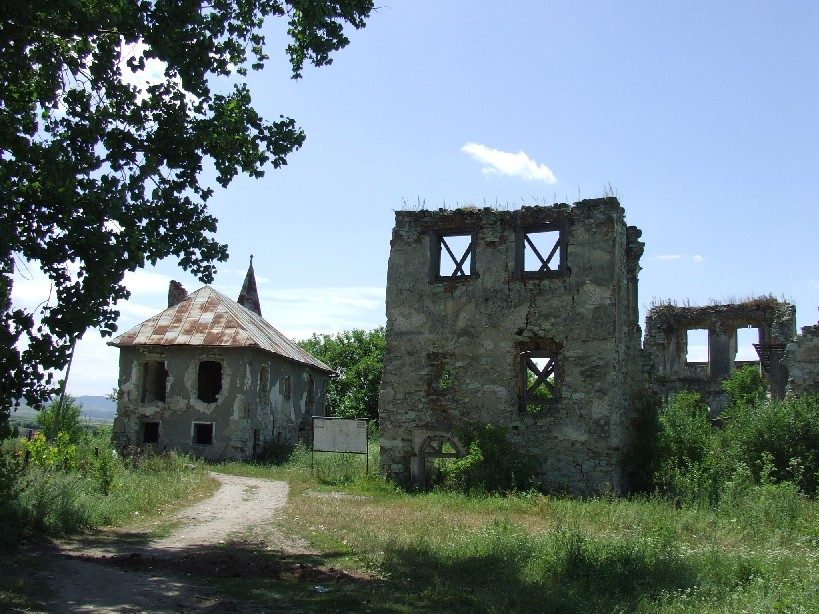
Ruins of the castle

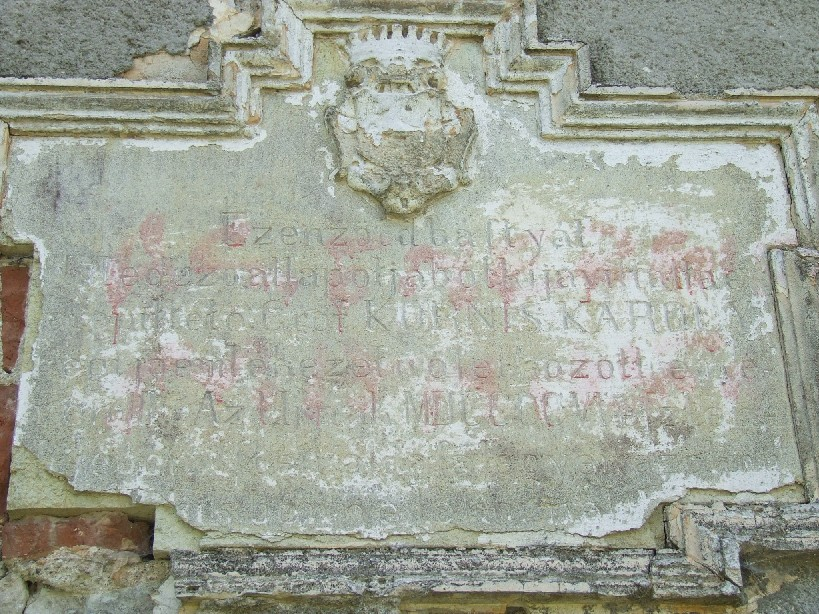
Coat of arms on one of the buildings

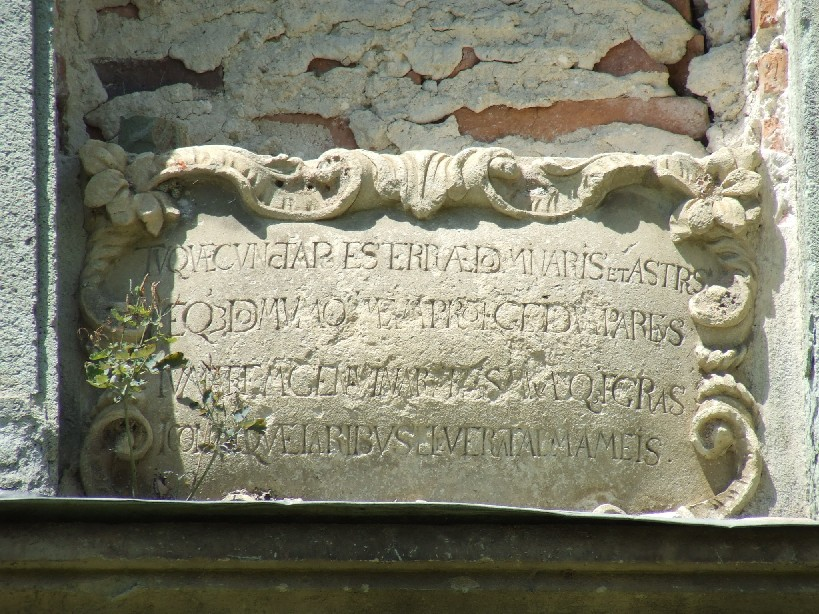
Coat of arms

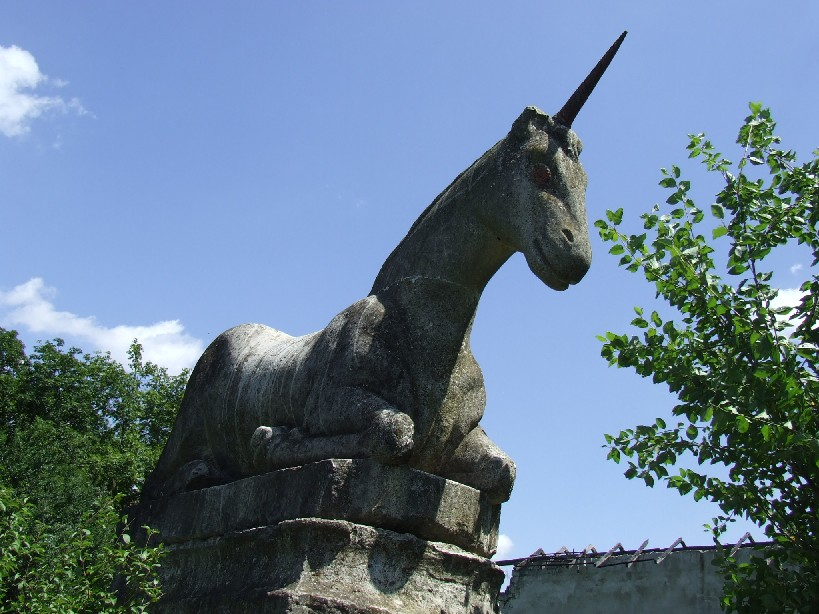
Unicorn

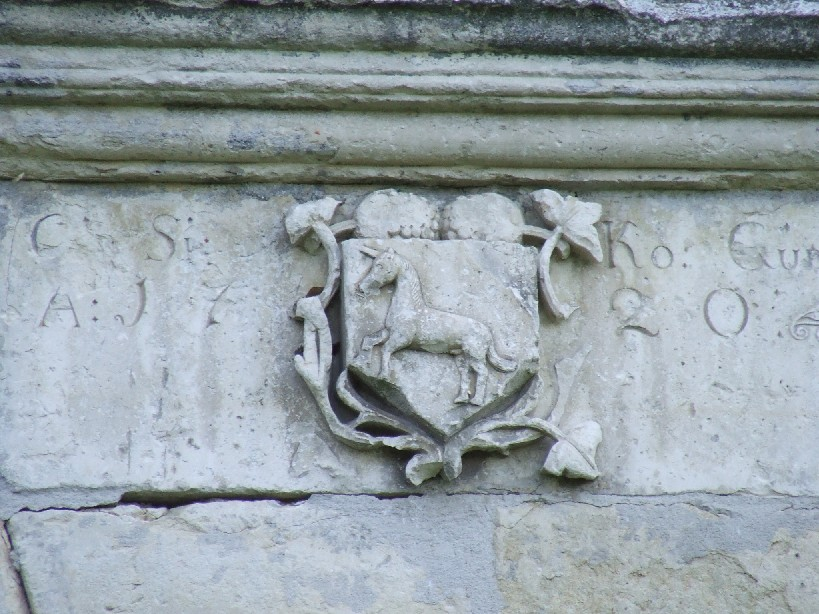
Coat of arms of the Kornis family

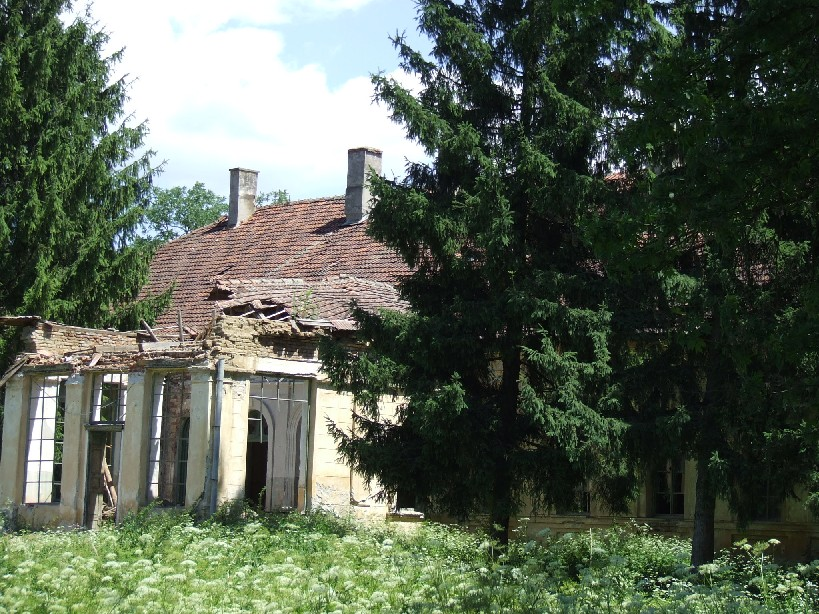
Adjacent building

== Bibliography ==
- Repertoriul arheologic al județului Cluj, Cluj-Napoca, 1992.
