= Cornelia Filipaș =

Romanian politician

Cornelia Filipaș (born 1926) was a Romanian communist politician.

Filipaș served as Vice-President of The Council of Ministers from 1980 to 1982, and as Ambassador to Denmark from 1982 to 1989.
