= Sânpaul, Cluj =

Sânpaul Sânpalu Unguresc
- Commune
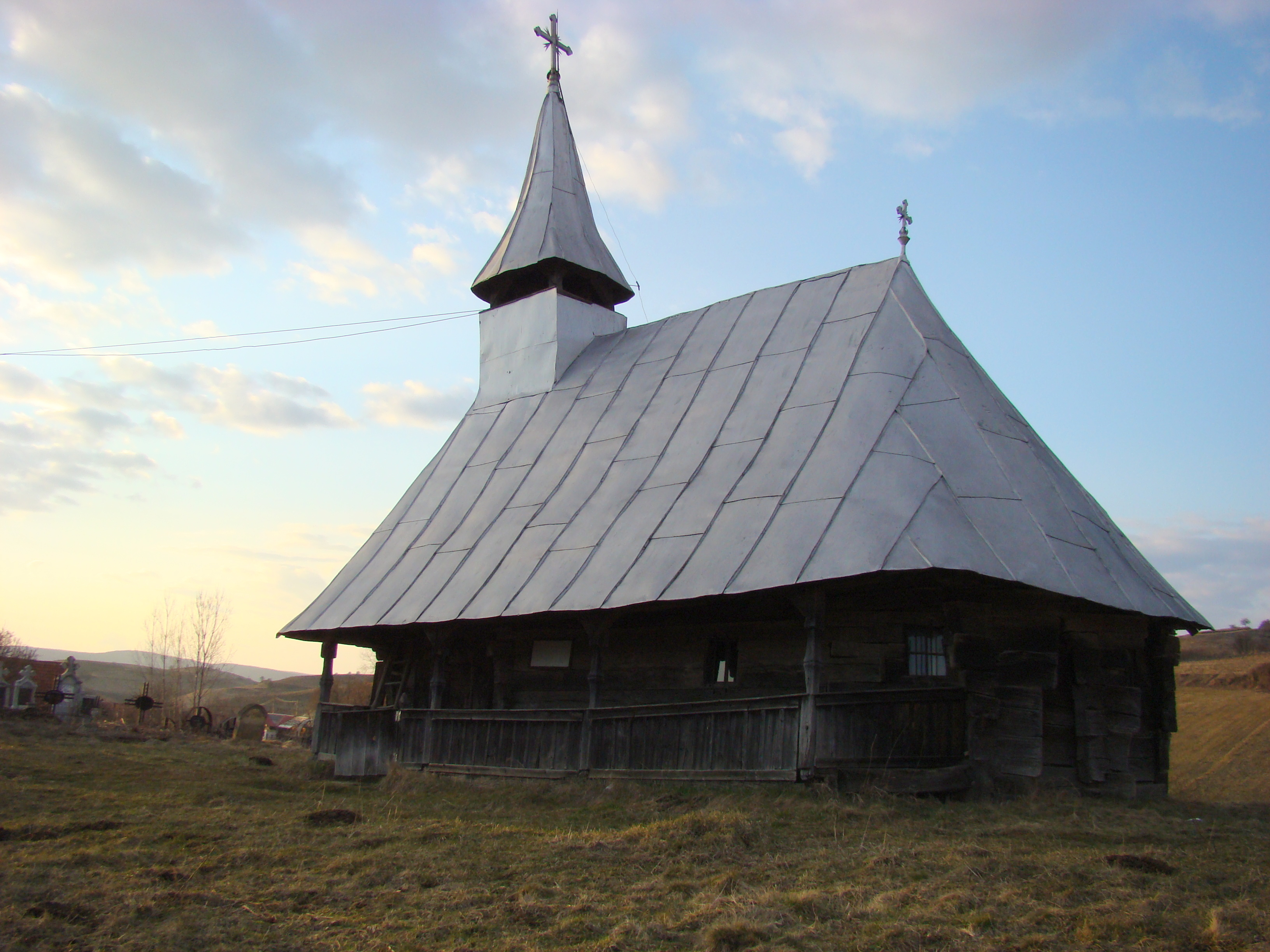
- Wooden church in Sumurducu

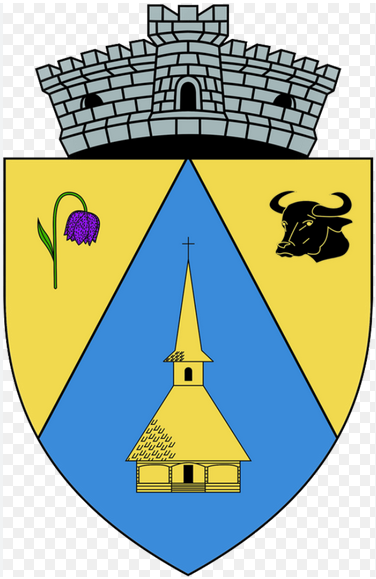
- Coat of arms

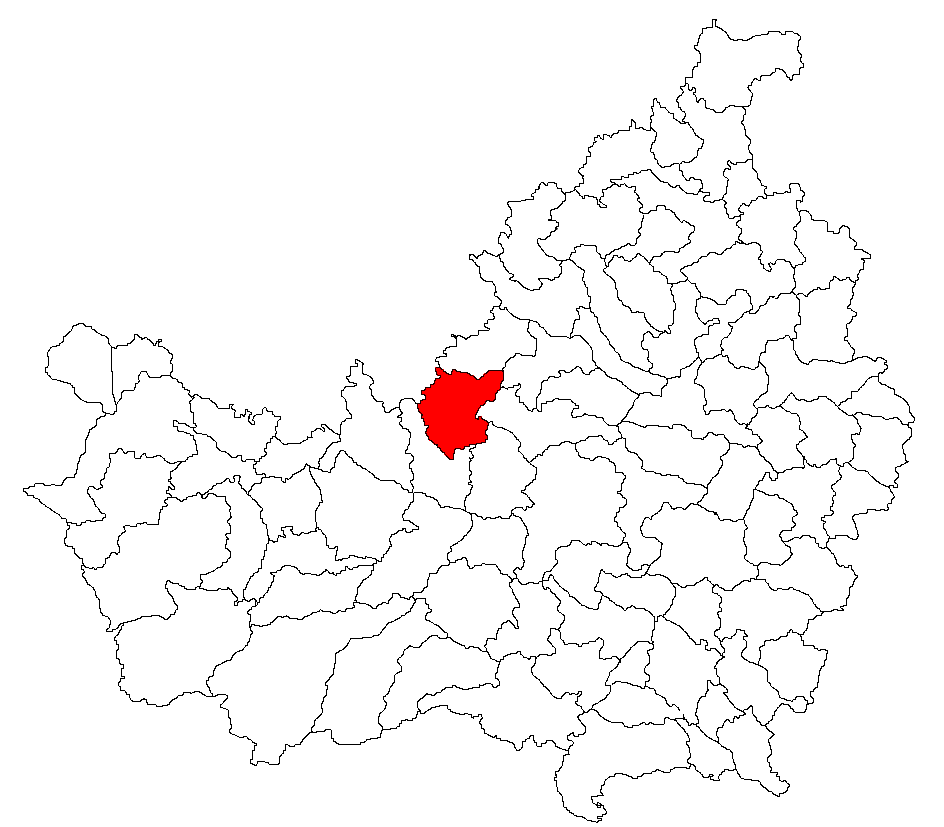
- Location in Cluj County

- Location in Romania
- Coordinates: 46°52′14.88″N 23°25′9.48″E
- Country: Romania
- County: Cluj
- Subdivisions: Berindu, Mihăiești, Sânpaul, Sumurducu, Șardu, Topa Mică

Government
  - Mayor (2020–2024): Ovidiu Colceriu (PNL)
- Area: 93.22 km^{2} (35.99 sq mi)
- Elevation: 428 m (1,404 ft)
- Population (2021-12-01): 2,314
  - Density: 24.82/km^{2} (64.29/sq mi)
- Time zone: UTC+02:00 (EET)
  - Summer (DST): UTC+03:00 (EEST)
- Postal code: 407530
- Area code: (+40) 02 64
- Vehicle reg.: CJ
- Website: www.sanpaulcluj.ro

Sânpaul (Hungarian: Magyarszentpál, Szentpál) is a commune in Cluj County, Transylvania, Romania. It is composed of six villages: Berindu (Nádasberend), Mihăiești (Nádasszentmihály), Sânpaul, Sumurducu (Szomordok), Șardu (Magyarsárd), and Topa Mică (Pusztatopa).

== Demographics ==
According to the census from 2002 there was a total population of 2,563 people living in this commune; of this population, 86.57% were ethnic Romanians, 12.99% ethnic Roma, and 0.42% ethnic Hungarians. At the 2021 census, Sânpaul had a population of 2,314, of which 71.43% were Romanians and 20.1% Roma.

== Natives ==
- Ioan Alexandru (1941–2000), poet, essayist, and politician
