= Pălatca =

Pălatca Magyarpalatka
- Commune
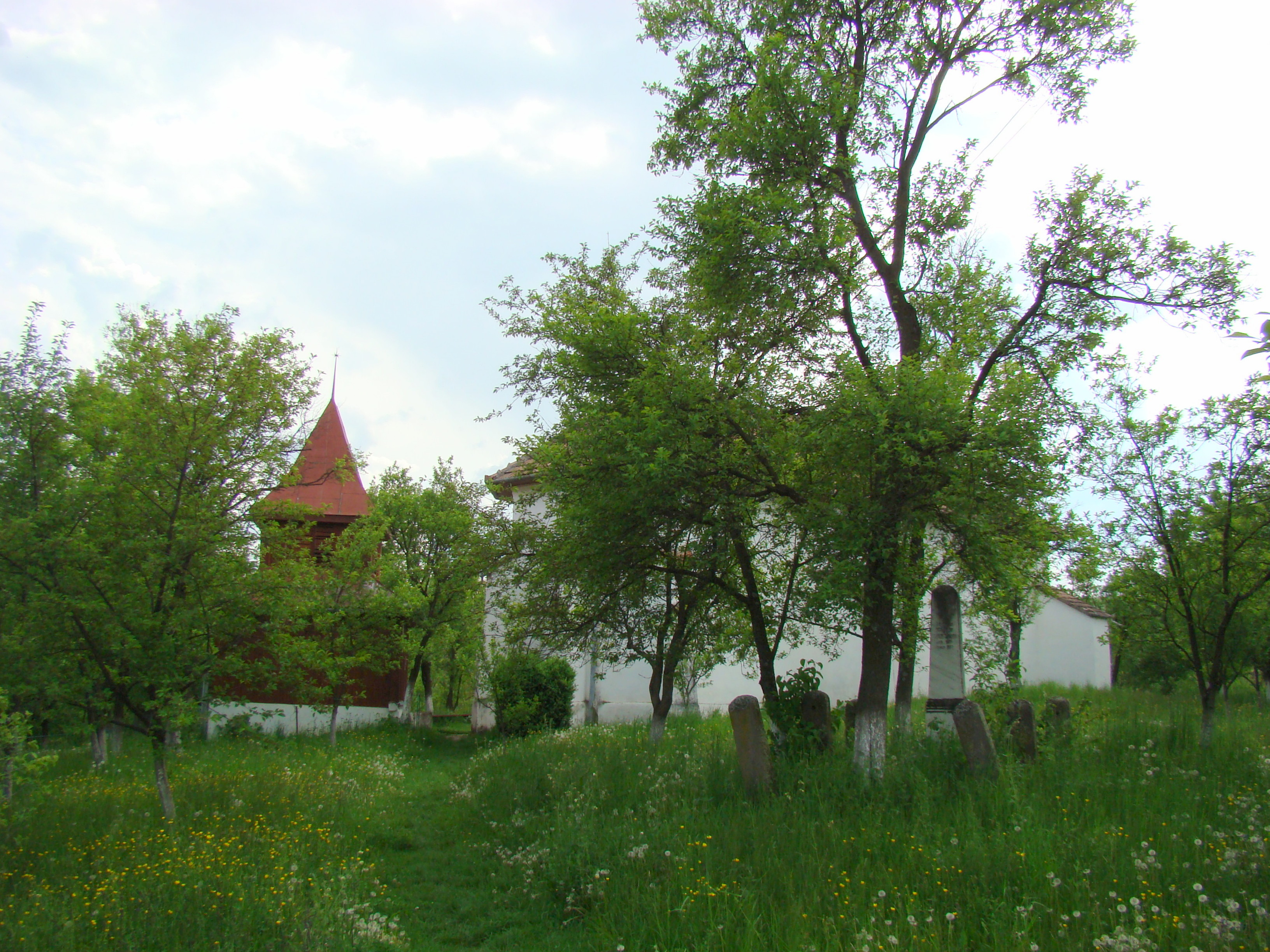
- Reformed church in Pălatca

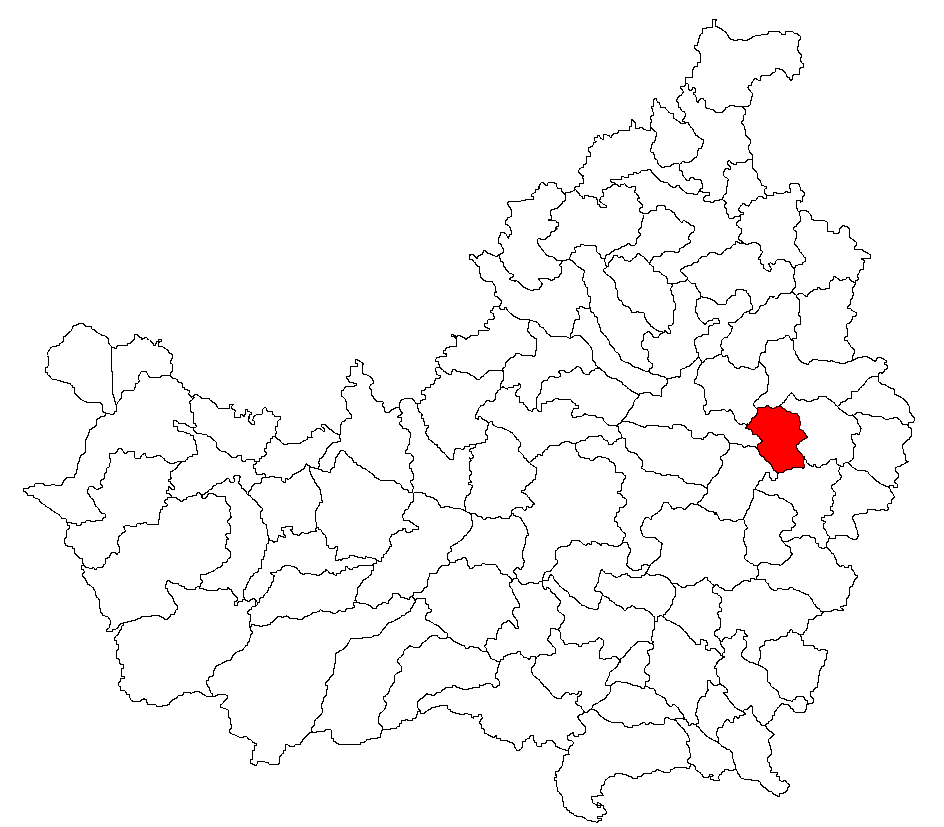
- Location in Cluj County

- Location in Romania
- Coordinates: 46°50′27″N 23°59′18″E
- Country: Romania
- County: Cluj
- Subdivisions: Băgaciu, Mureșenii de Câmpie, Pălatca, Petea, Sava

Government
  - Mayor (2020–2024): Ioan Huldușan (PNL)
- Area: 48.36 km^{2} (18.67 sq mi)
- Elevation: 333 m (1,093 ft)
- Population (2021-12-01): 1,133
  - Density: 23.43/km^{2} (60.68/sq mi)
- Time zone: UTC+02:00 (EET)
  - Summer (DST): UTC+03:00 (EEST)
- Postal code: 407450
- Area code: (+40) 02 64
- Vehicle reg.: CJ
- Website: primariapalatca.ro

Pălatca (Hungarian: Magyarpalatka; German: Pallotken) is a commune in Cluj County, Transylvania, Romania. It is composed of five villages: Băgaciu (Kisbogács), Mureșenii de Câmpie (formerly Imbuz; Omboztelke), Pălatca, Petea (Magyarpete), and Sava (Mezőszava).

== Demographics ==
According to the census from 2002 there was a total population of 1,374 people living in this commune; of this population, 71.90% were ethnic Romanians, 23.87% were ethnic Hungarians, and 4.14% ethnic Roma. At the 2021 census, Pălatca had a population of 1,133, of which 60.46% were Romanians, 21.54% Hungarians, and 11.65% Roma.

== See also ==
- Palatka Gypsy Band
