= Meleș =

- Location within Romania

Location
- Country: Romania
- Counties: Bistrița-Năsăud County
- Villages and towns: Matei, Nușeni, Beclean

Physical characteristics
- Mouth: Someșul Mare
  - location: Beclean
  - coordinates: 47.1773°N 24.1685°E
- Length: 33 km (21 mi)
- Basin size: 320 km^{2} (120 sq mi)

Basin features
- Progression: Someșul Mare→ Someș→ Tisza→ Danube→ Black Sea
- Tributaries
  - left: Apatiu, Mălin
  - right: Sărata

The Meleș is a left tributary of the river Someșul Mare in Romania. It discharges into the Someșul Mare in Beclean. Its length is 33 km (21 mi) and its basin size is 320 km^{2} (120 sq mi).
