= Chiochiș =

Chiochiș Kékes
- Commune
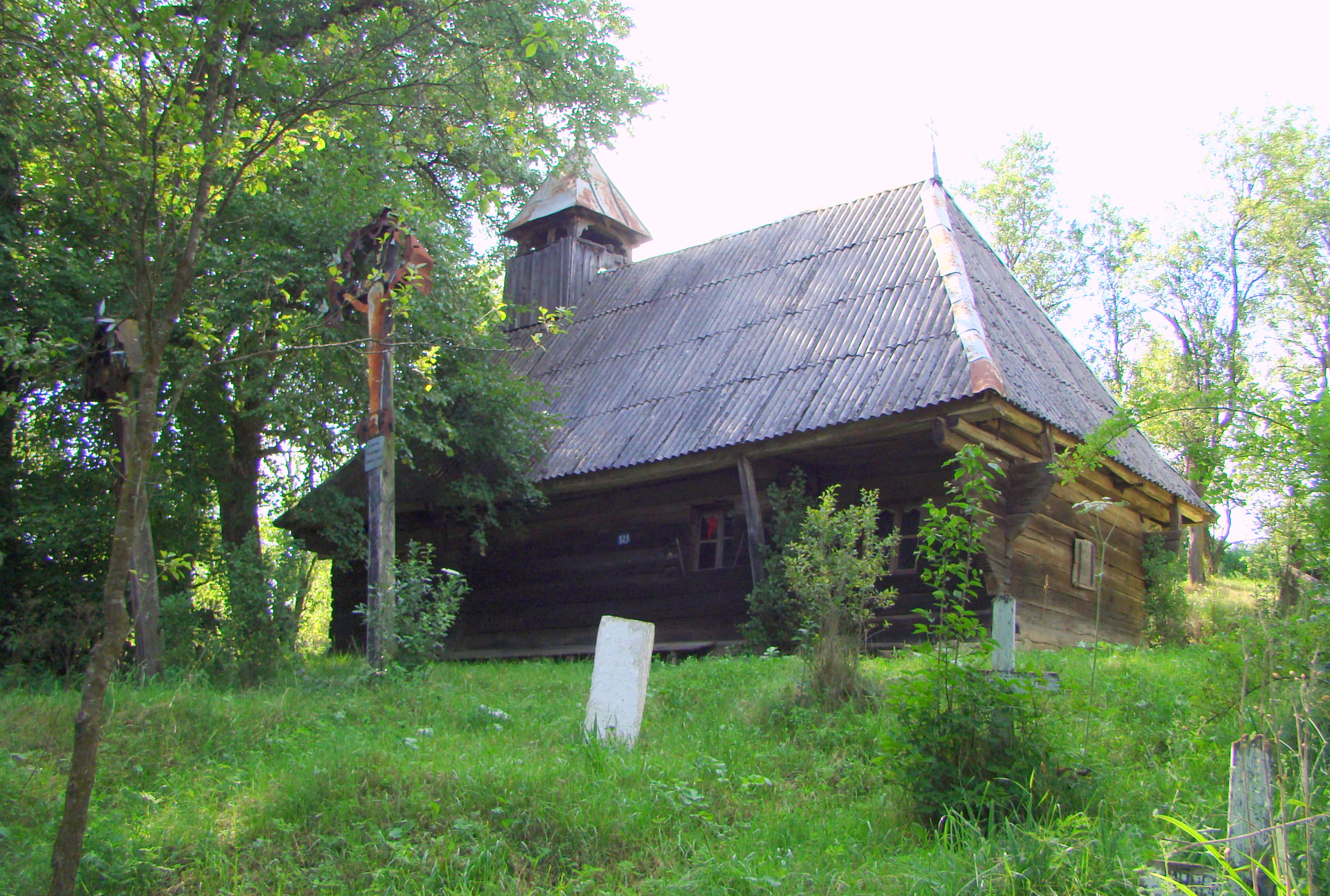
- Wooden church in Apatiu

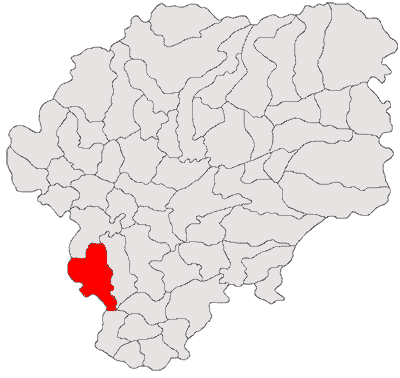
- Location in Bistrița-Năsăud County

- Location in Romania
- Coordinates: 46°59′N 24°11′E
- Country: Romania
- County: Bistrița-Năsăud

Government
  - Mayor (2020–2024): Vasile-Adrian Silasi (PNL)
- Area: 91.13 km^{2} (35.19 sq mi)
- Elevation: 343 m (1,125 ft)
- Population (2021-12-01): 2,629
  - Density: 28.85/km^{2} (74.72/sq mi)
- Time zone: UTC+02:00 (EET)
  - Summer (DST): UTC+03:00 (EEST)
- Postal code: 427045
- Area code: +40 x59
- Vehicle reg.: BN
- Website: www.chiochis.ro

Chiochiș (Hungarian: Kékes) is a commune in Bistrița-Năsăud County, Transylvania, Romania. It is composed of ten villages: Apatiu (Dellőapáti), Bozieș (Magyarborzás), Buza Cătun (Buzaifogadók), Chețiu (Ketel), Chiochiș, Jimbor (formerly Jimborul Săsesc; Szászzsombor, Zsombor; German: Sommer), Manic (Mányik), Sânnicoară (Aranyosszentmiklós), Strugureni (formerly Vereșhaza, Verihaza; Mezőveresegyháza, Veresegyháza; German: Rothkirch, Rothkirchen), and Țentea (Cente).

== Geography ==
The commune lies on the Transylvanian Plateau, on the banks of the river Apatiu and its tributary, the river Beudiu. It is located in the southwestern part of the county, on the border with Cluj County, at a distance of 27 km (17 mi) from the town of Beclean and 42 km (26 mi) from the county seat, Bistrița; the city of Gherla is 31 km (19 mi) to the west, in Cluj County.

== Demographics ==
At the 2011 census, 73.2% of the population were Romanians, 24.1% Hungarians and 2.5% Roma. At the 2002 census, 68.7% were Romanian Orthodox, 22.1% Reformed, 4% Pentecostal, 2% Baptist, and 1.8% Greek-Catholic.

== Notable people ==
- Iuliu Prodan (1875–1959), botanist
- Cornelia Filipaș (born 1926), communist politician

== Places of interest ==
The following churches are situated in the commune:

- Bozieș wooden church
- Bozieș Reformed church
- Buza Cătun wooden church
- Manic wooden church
- Strugureni wooden church
- Strugureni Reformed church

On the western side of the village of Manic there is a string of lakes, set up in 1980; the lakes are rich in Prussian carp.
