= Sânmartin, Cluj =

Sânmartin
- Commune
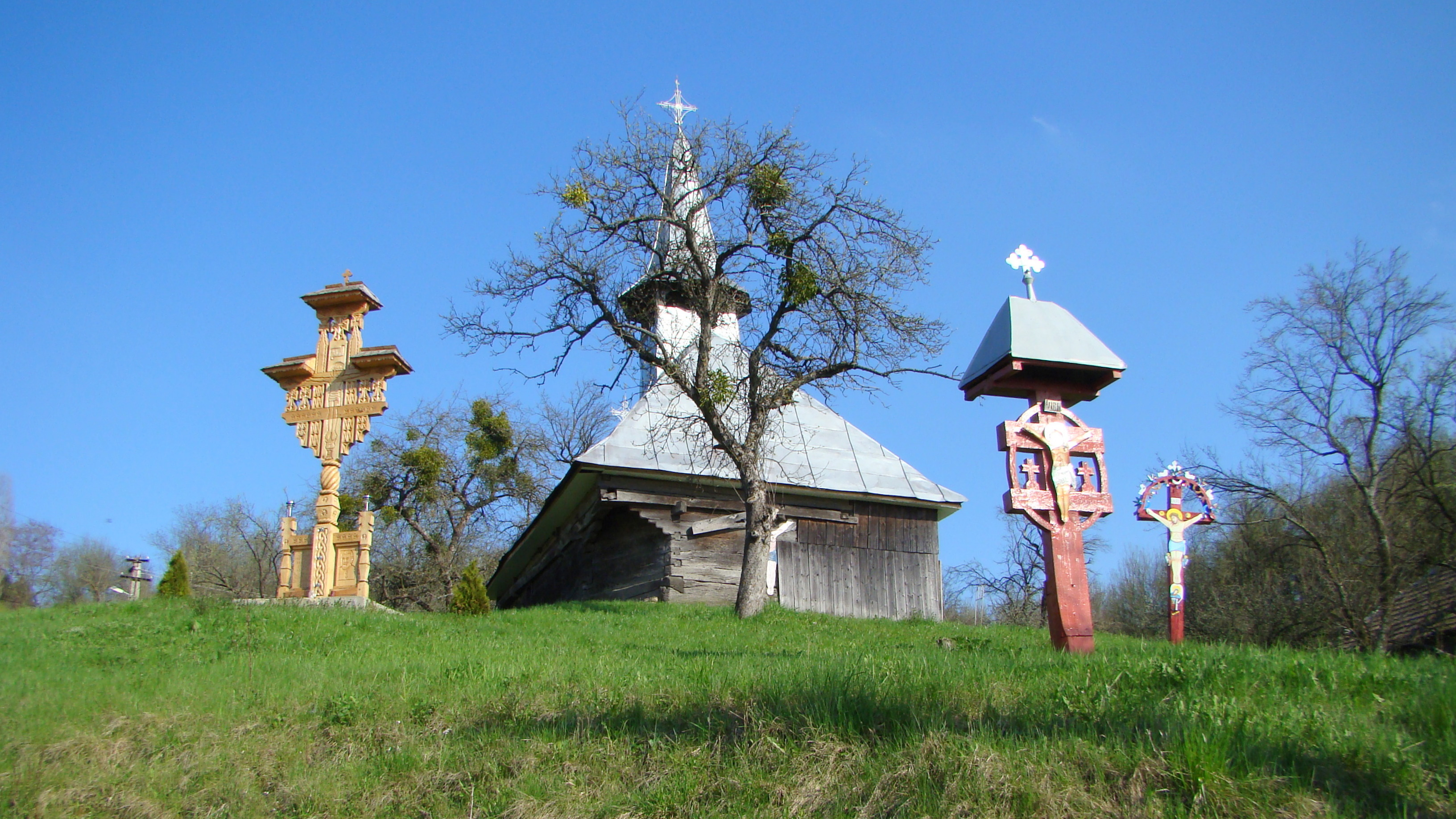
- Wooden church in Cutca

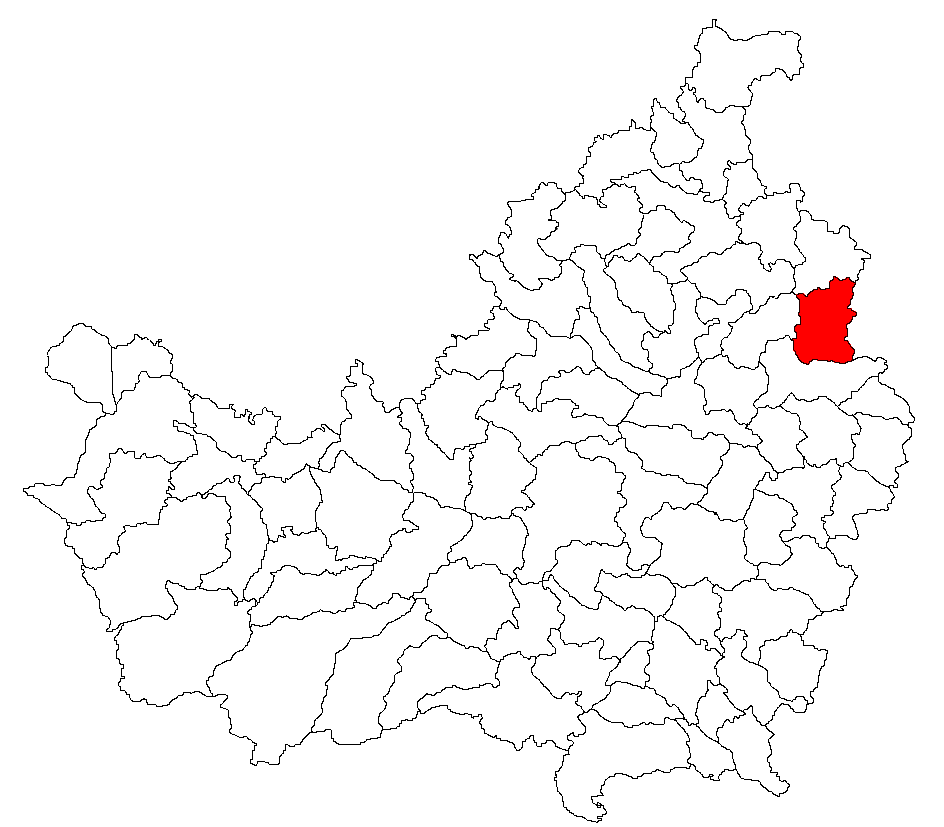
- Location in Cluj County

- Location in Romania
- Coordinates: 47°0′32.04″N 24°4′42.96″E
- Country: Romania
- County: Cluj
- Subdivisions: Ceaba, Cutca, Diviciorii Mari, Diviciorii Mici, Măhal, Sâmboieni, Sânmartin, Târgușor

Government
  - Mayor (2020–2024): Ioan Fărtan (PNL)
- Area: 71.91 km^{2} (27.76 sq mi)
- Elevation: 320 m (1,050 ft)
- Population (2021-12-01): 1,110
  - Density: 15.4/km^{2} (40.0/sq mi)
- Time zone: UTC+02:00 (EET)
  - Summer (DST): UTC+03:00 (EEST)
- Postal code: 407520
- Area code: (+40) 02 64
- Vehicle reg.: CJ
- Website: primariasinmartin.ro

Sânmartin (Hungarian: Szépkenyerűszentmárton) is a commune in Cluj County, Transylvania, Romania. It is composed of eight villages: Ceaba (Bálványoscsaba), Cutca (Kötke), Diviciorii Mari (Nagydevecser), Diviciorii Mici (Kisdevecser), Măhal (Mohaly), Sâmboieni (Erdőszombattelke), Sânmartin, and Târgușor (Kékesvásárhely).

== Demographics ==
According to the census from 2002 there was a total population of 1,744 people living in this commune; of this population, 86.52% were ethnic Romanians, 10.43% ethnic Hungarians, and 3.03% ethnic Roma. At the 2021 census, Sânmartin had a population of 1,110, of which 74.59% were Romanians, 9.01% Hungarians, and 5.5% Roma.

== Natives ==
- Emil Giurgiuca (1906–1992), poet
