= Mica, Cluj =

Mica
- Commune
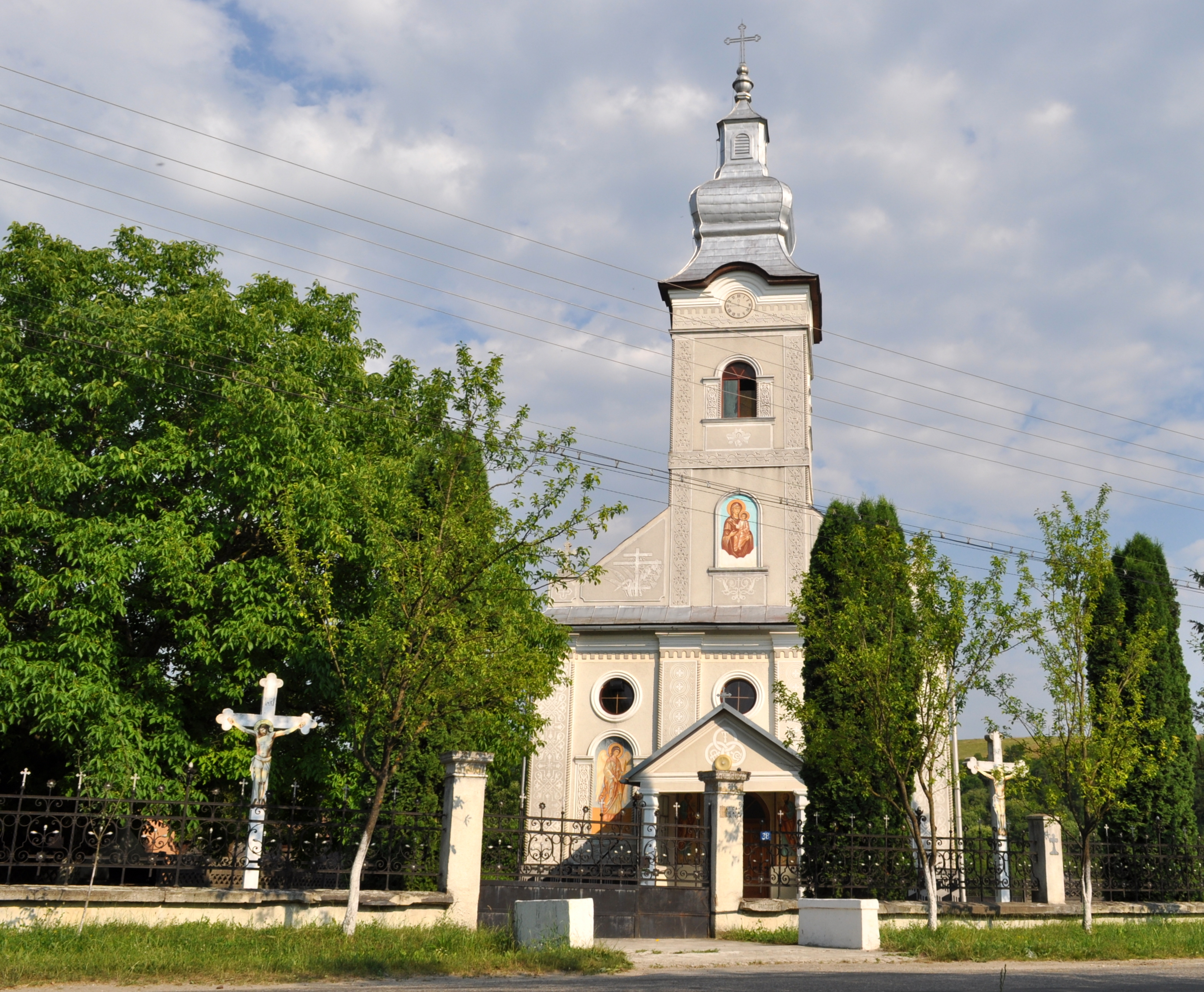
- Archangels' church in Mica

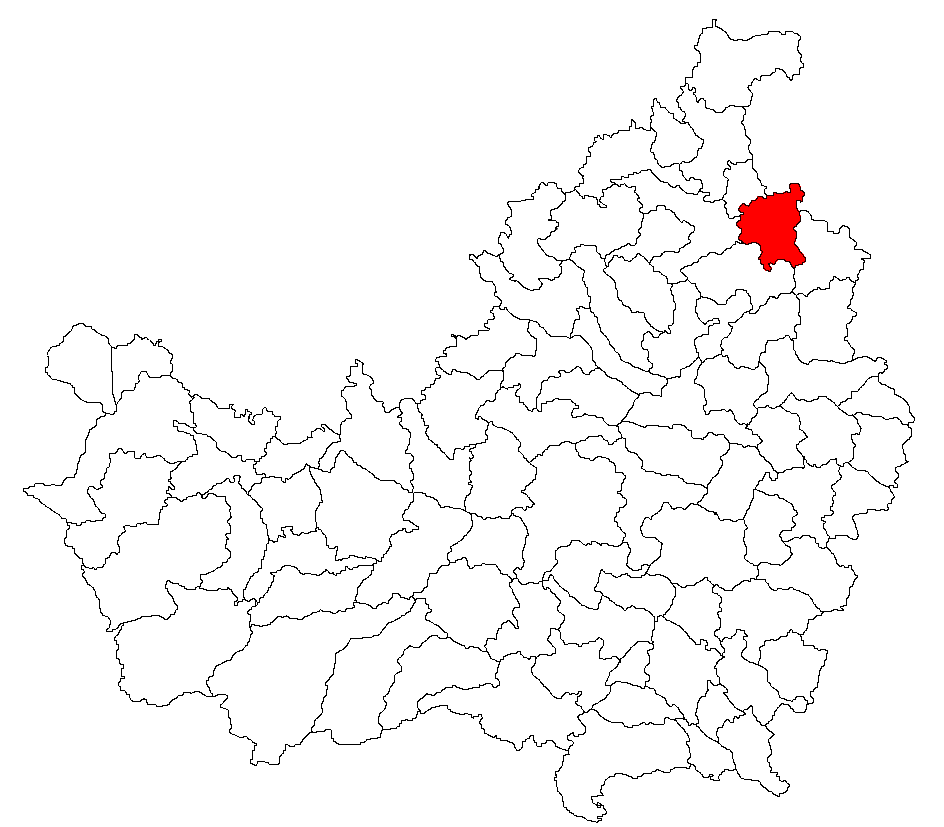
- Location in Cluj County

- Location in Romania
- Coordinates: 47°8′45″N 23°55′50″E
- Country: Romania
- County: Cluj
- Subdivisions: Dâmbu Mare, Mănăstirea, Mica, Nireș, Sânmărghita, Valea Cireșoii, Valea Luncii

Government
  - Mayor (2020–2024): Roland-Tiberiu Zelencz (PNL)
- Area: 64.62 km^{2} (24.95 sq mi)
- Elevation: 238 m (781 ft)
- Population (2021-12-01): 3,459
  - Density: 53.53/km^{2} (138.6/sq mi)
- Time zone: UTC+02:00 (EET)
  - Summer (DST): UTC+03:00 (EEST)
- Postal code: 407395
- Area code: +(40) x64
- Vehicle reg.: CJ
- Website: www.primariamica.ro

Mica (Hungarian: Mikeháza) is a commune in Cluj County, Transylvania, Romania. It is composed of seven villages: Dâmbu Mare (Nagydomb), Mănăstirea (Szentbenedek), Mica, Nireș (Szásznyíres), Sânmărghita (Szentmargita), Valea Cireșoii (Décseipataktanya), and Valea Luncii (Lunkatanya).

Mănăstirea village is the site of Kornis Castle.

== Demographics ==
According to the census from 2002, there was a total population of 3,836 people living in this commune; of those, 70.77% were ethnic Romanians, 28.12% ethnic Hungarians, and 0.06% ethnic Roma. At the 2011 census, there were 3,566 inhabitants, including 70.25% Romanians, 26.19% Hungarians, and 2.08% Roma. At the 2021 census, Mica had a population of 3,566, of which 74.21% were Romanians, 18.91% Hungarians, and 2.11% Roma.
