= Geaca =

- Commune
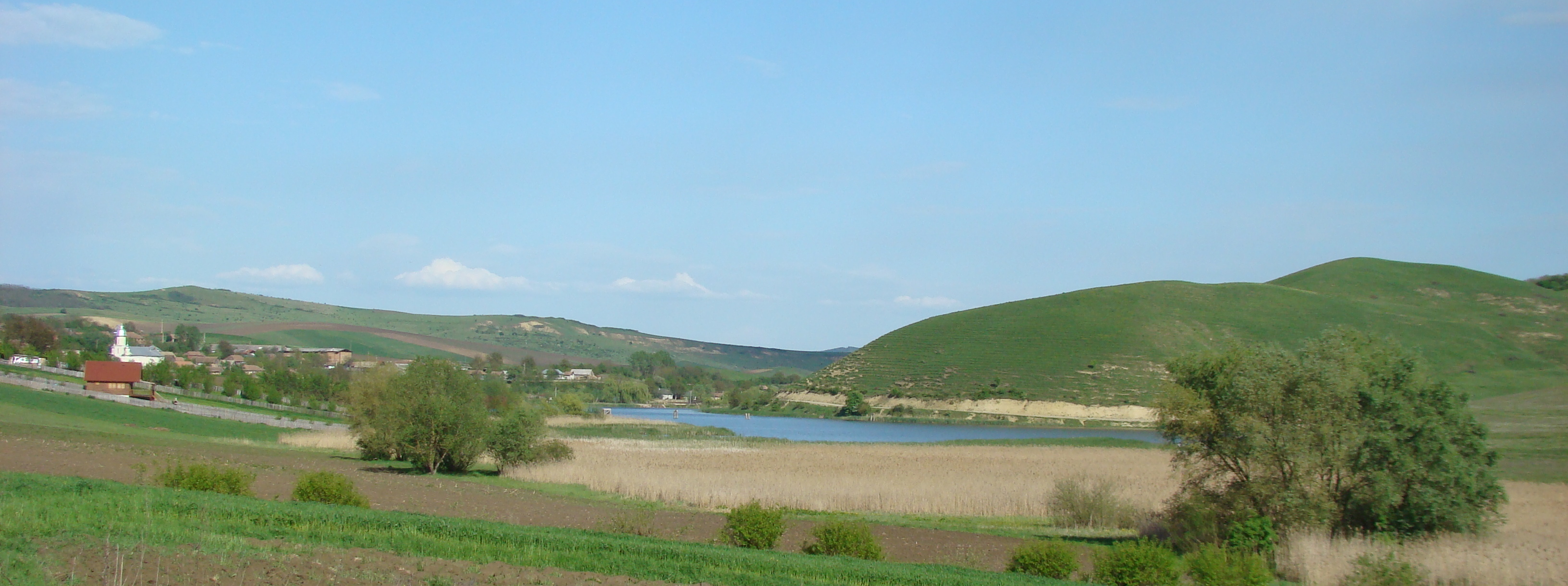

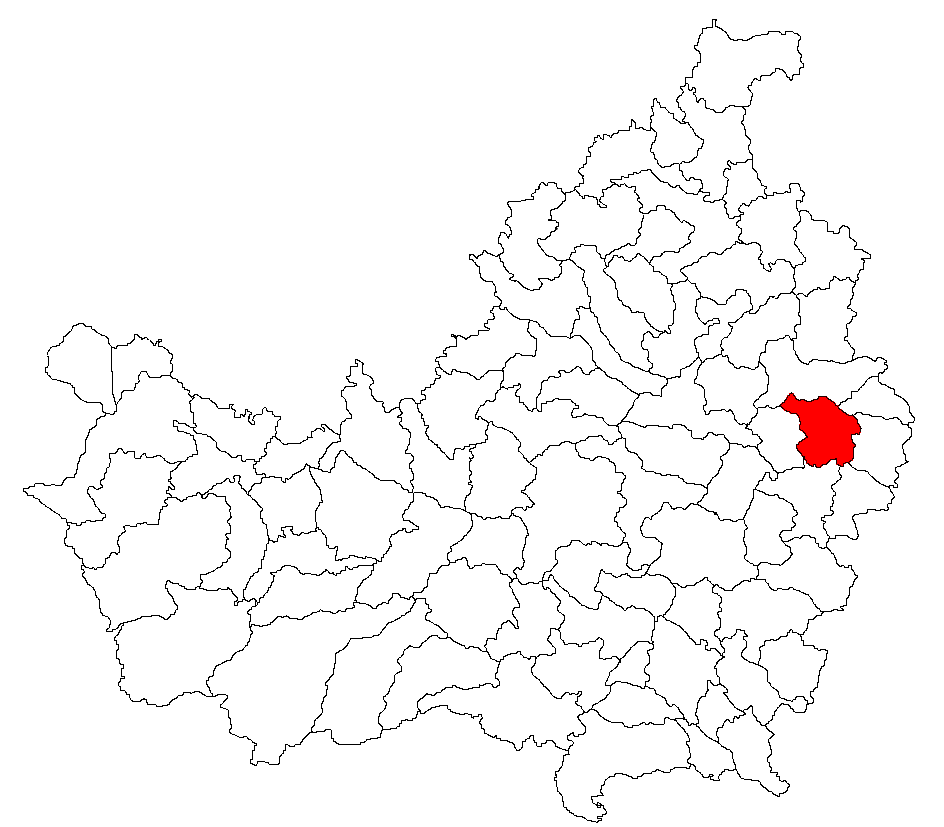
- Location in Cluj County

- Location in Romania
- Coordinates: 46°51′32″N 24°05′23″E
- Country: Romania
- County: Cluj
- Established: 1326
- Subdivisions: Chiriș, Geaca, Lacu, Legii, Puini, Sucutard

Government
  - Mayor (2024–2028): Daniel-Ionuț Cheța (PSD)
- Area: 68.68 km^{2} (26.52 sq mi)
- Elevation: 326 m (1,070 ft)
- Population (2021-12-01): 1,410
  - Density: 20.5/km^{2} (53.2/sq mi)
- Time zone: UTC+02:00 (EET)
  - Summer (DST): UTC+03:00 (EEST)
- Postal code: 407300
- Area code: +(40) 0264
- Vehicle reg.: CJ
- Website: primariageaca.ro

Geaca (Hungarian: Gyeke; German: Jeckel) is a commune in Cluj County, Transylvania, Romania. It is composed of six villages: Chiriș (Kőristanya), Geaca, Lacu (Feketelak), Legii (Légen), Puini (Kispulyon), and Sucutard (Vasasszentgothárd).

== Demographics ==
According to the census from 2002, the commune had a population of 1,744, of which 81.07% were ethnic Romanians, 17.31% ethnic Hungarians, and 1.43% ethnic Roma. At the 2021 census, Geaca had a population of 1,410; of those, 75.6% were Romanians, 11.28% Hungarians, and 3.4% Roma.
