= Fizeșu Gherlii =

- Commune
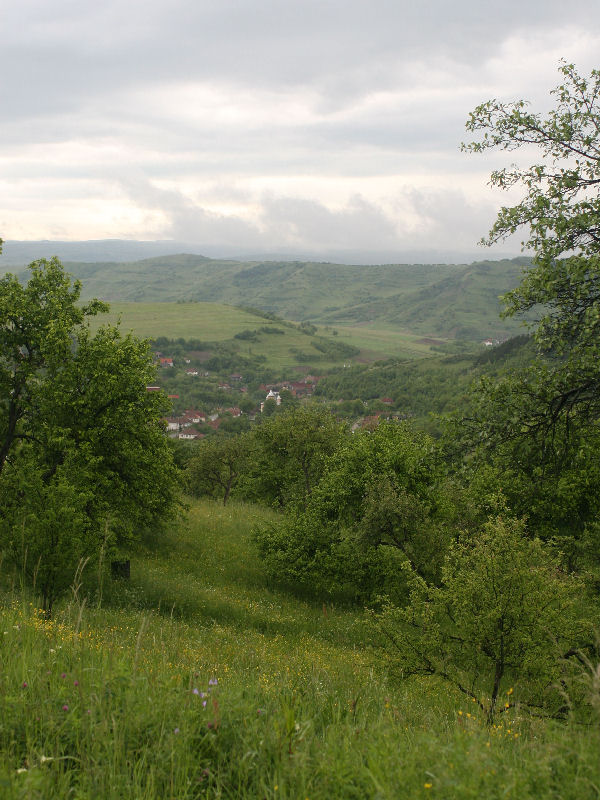
- View of Nicula from Nicula Monastery

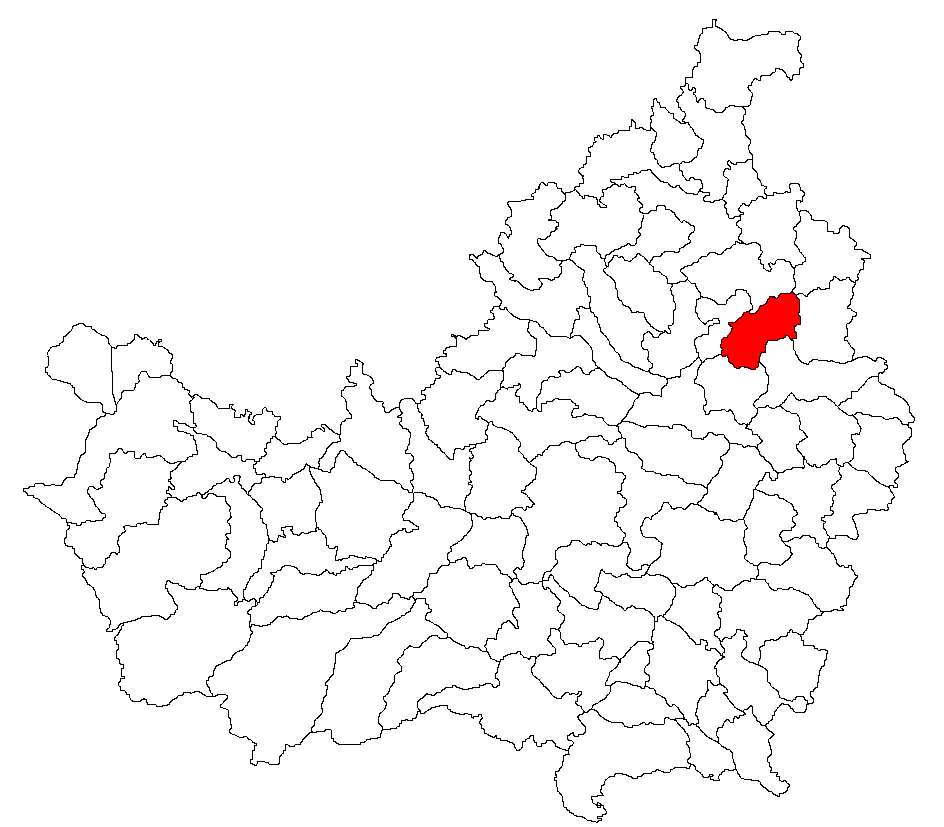
- Location in Cluj County

- Location in Romania
- Coordinates: 47°01′41″N 23°59′16″E
- Country: Romania
- County: Cluj
- Established: 1230
- Subdivisions: Bonț, Fizeșu Gherlii, Nicula, Săcălaia

Government
  - Mayor (2020–2024): Vasile-Ioan Lup (PNL)
- Area: 67.12 km^{2} (25.92 sq mi)
- Elevation: 273 m (896 ft)
- Population (2021-12-01): 2,191
  - Density: 32.64/km^{2} (84.55/sq mi)
- Time zone: UTC+02:00 (EET)
  - Summer (DST): UTC+03:00 (EEST)
- Postal code: 407275
- Area code: +(40) x64
- Vehicle reg.: CJ
- Website: fizesu-gherlii.ro

Fizeşu Gherlii (Hungarian: Ördöngösfüzes; German: Teufelswald) is a commune in Cluj County, Transylvania, Romania. It is composed of four villages: Bonț (Boncnyíres), Fizeșu Gherlii, Nicula (Füzesmikola), and Săcălaia (Kisszék).

Nicula village is the site of Nicula Monastery.

== Demographics ==
According to the 2011 census, the commune had a population of 2,564; Romanians made up 57.9% of the population, Hungarians made up 20.9%, and Roma made up 16.1%. At the 2021 census, Fizeșu Gherlii had a population of 2,191; of those, 53.4% were Romanians, 19.67% Hungarians, and 15.65% Roma.

== Notes ==
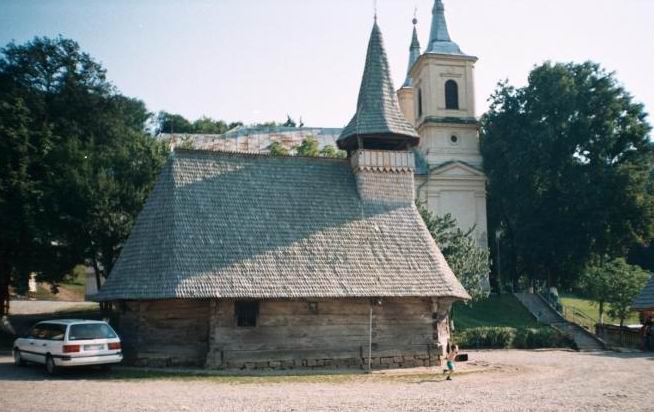
Wooden church in Nicula village

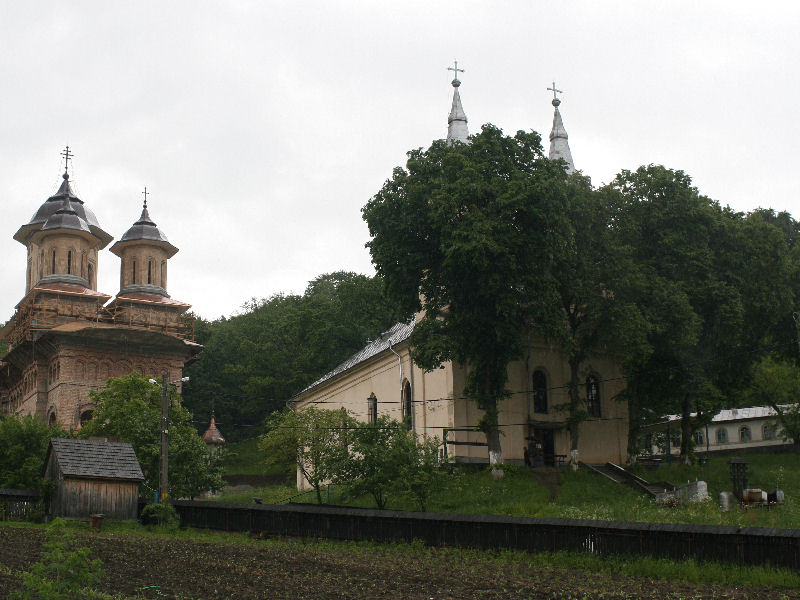
Two churches in Nicula
