= Carl Liner =

Carl Liner may refer to:

- Carl August Liner (1871–1946), Swiss painter
- Carl Walter Liner (1914–1997), Swiss painter
