= Friedrich Miess =

Imperial Austrian-born painter

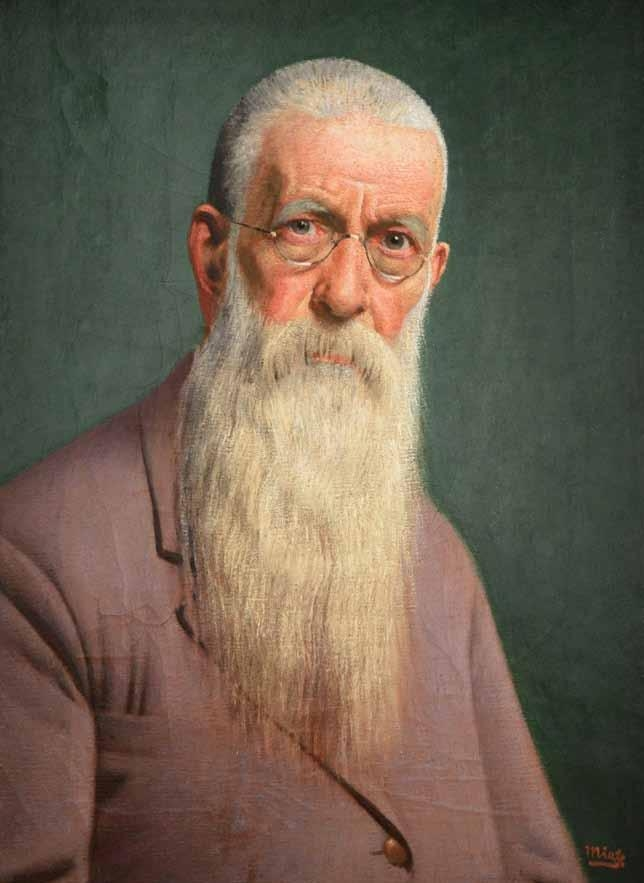
- Self-portrait, c. 1930s
- Born: Rudolph Friedrich Miess; 21 August 1854; Brassó, Kingdom of Hungary, Austrian Empire
- Died: 29 May 1935 (aged 80); Brașov, Romania
- Education: Academy of fine arts
- Known for: Painting
- Notable work: Official portrait of Ottokar Czernin
- Style: Academic art, impressionism

Rudolph Friedrich Miess (21 August 1854 – 29 May 1935) was an Imperial Austrian-born painter from the Transylvania region, today part of Romania. Although he did numerous portraits, he is best known for his landscapes, which combine the Academic and Impressionist styles.

== Biography ==
He was born to a family of wealthy Transylvanian Saxon merchants, and pursued that trade until he was twenty-nine. At that time, his interest in art led him to enroll at the Academy of Fine Arts, Vienna, where he studied for two years, then transferred to the Academy of Fine Arts in Munich, where he studied with the history painter, Johann Caspar Herterich. While there, he was also influenced by the works of Wilhelm Leibl, Max Liebermann and Fritz von Uhde.

From 1890 to 1891, he went to Italy, visiting Rome and Venice, where he copied the works of Titian. He returned to Italy two years later, living in Cervara di Roma and painting landscapes en plein air. He spent the years 1894 to 1896 in Rome, working in the studio of his fellow German-Romanian, Robert Wellmann.

Upon returning to Brașov, he opened his own studio, becoming one of the first to work as a freelance artist in that area. His workshop soon became a meeting place for the German-speaking artistic community. Those who worked with him there included Hans Mattis-Teutsch and Margarete Depner. In 1903, he served on a committee charged with overseeing the selection of painters to work on the restoration of Holy Trinity Cathedral, Sibiu. He exhibited throughout Romania, as well as in Berlin and Budapest, where he was awarded a gold medal at the National Exhibition in 1909. Many of his works were reproduced in Die Karpathen, a local German-language magazine.

== Selected paintings ==
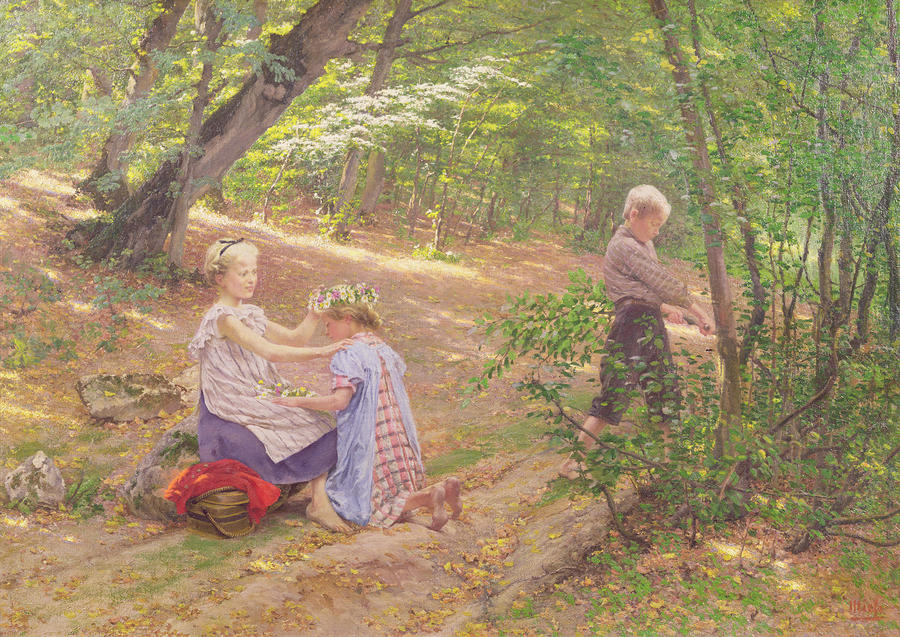
A Garland of Flowers

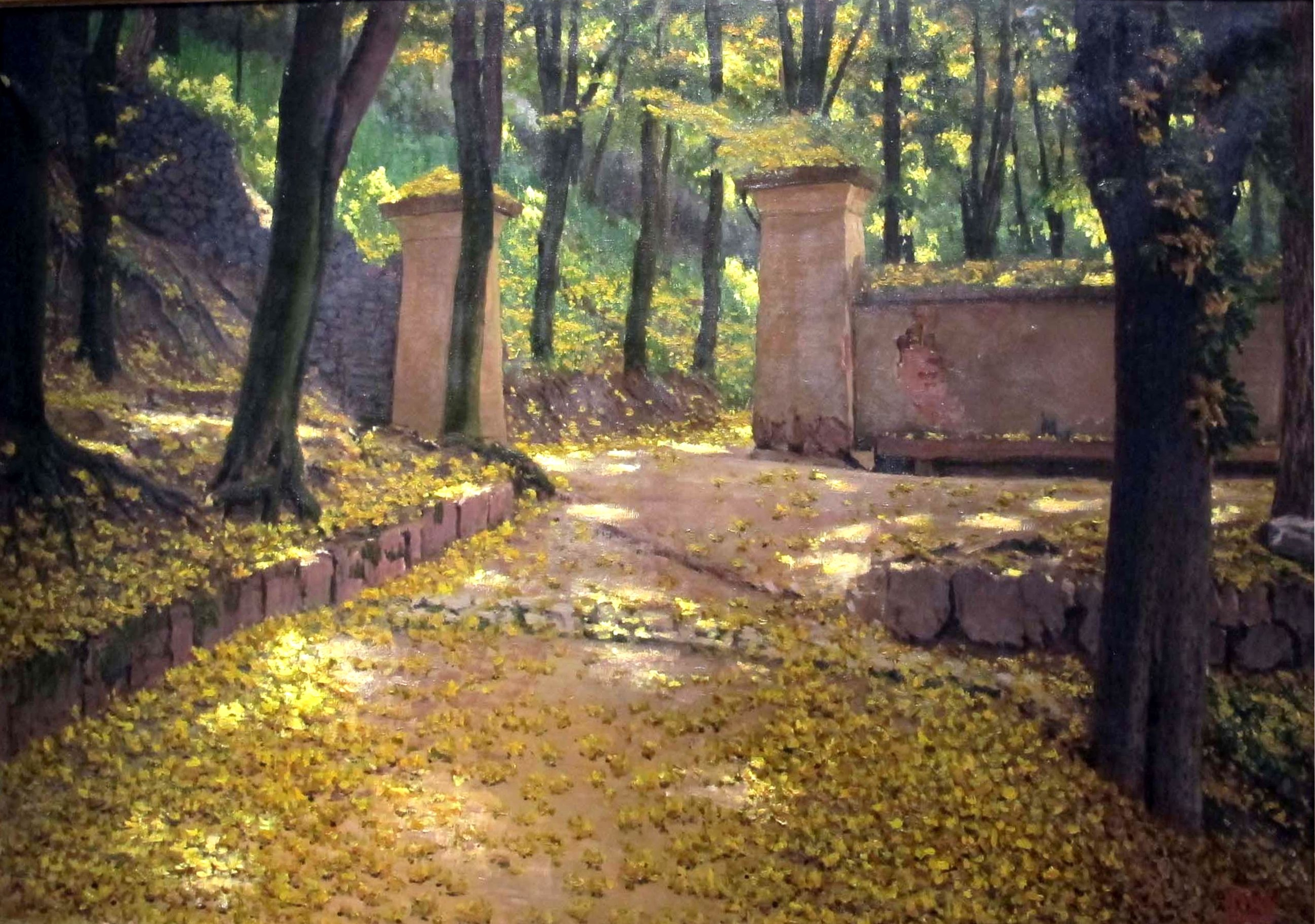
Autumn

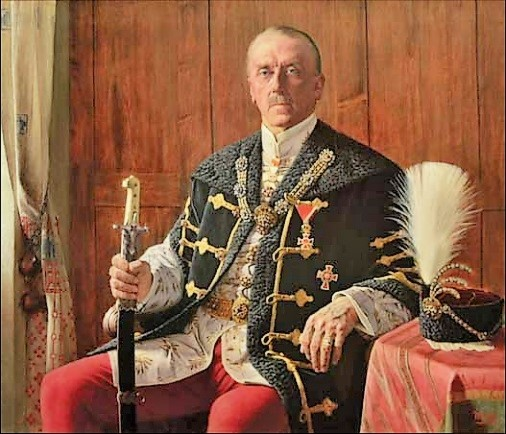
Portrait of
Count Ottokar von Czernin

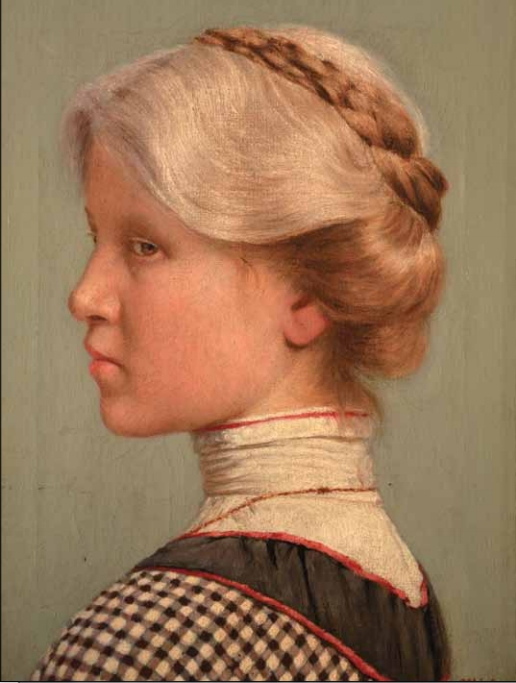
Portrait of a Young Girl
