= Adele Zay =

Transylvanian pedagogue, teacher and women's rights activist

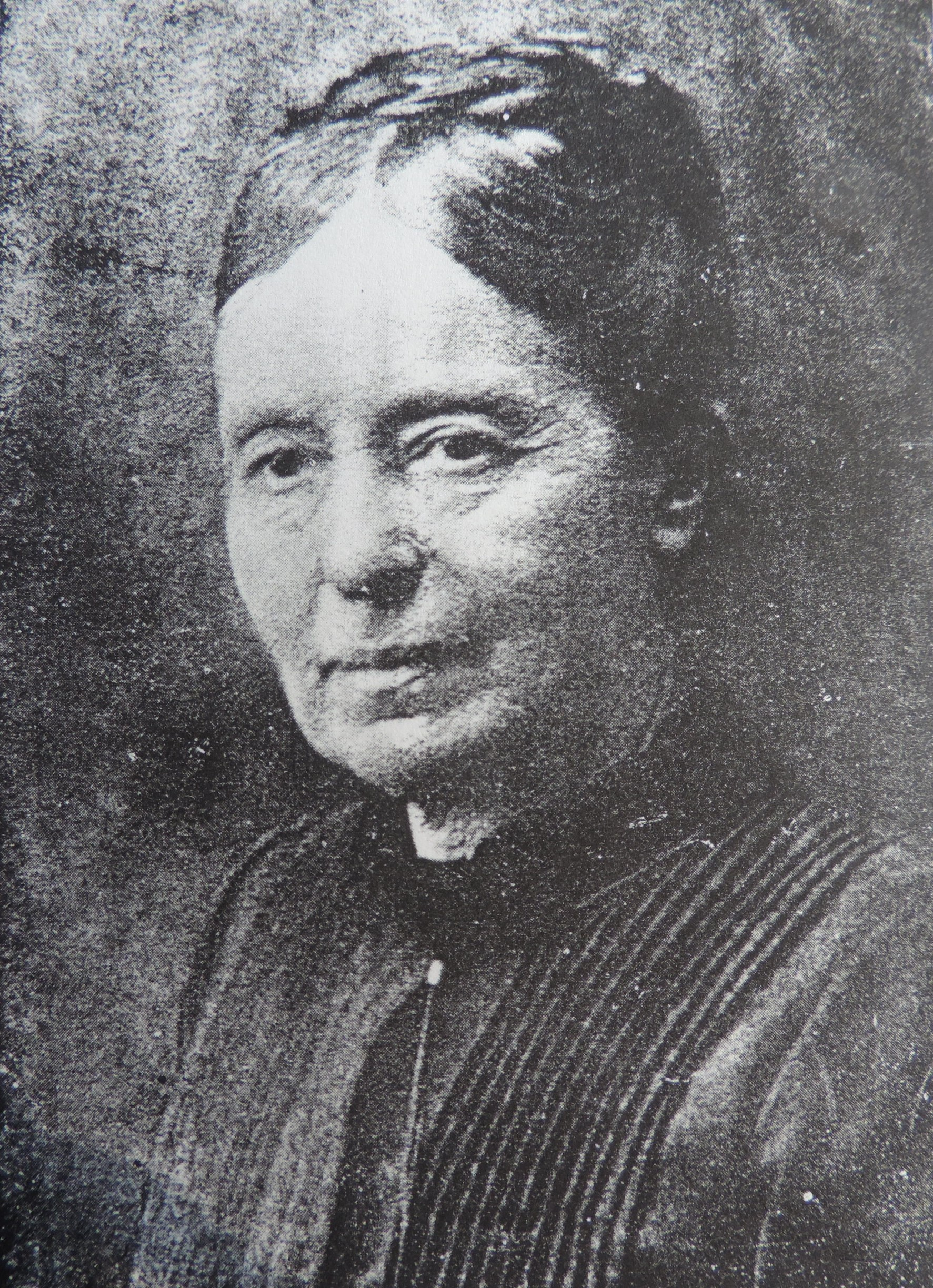
- Zay, portrait produced for the 50th anniversary of the Adele Zay School 1884–1935, Kronstadt, Romania
- Born: 29 February 1848; Hermannstadt, Austrian Empire
- Died: 29 December 1928 (aged 80); Brașov, Kingdom of Romania
- Other name: Zay Adél
- Occupations: teacher, pedagogue, women's rights advocate
- Years active: 1865–1927
- Relatives: Gustav Adolf Zay (brother)

Adele Zay (29 February 1848 – 29 December 1928) was a Transylvanian teacher, feminist and pedagogue. Her family were part of the German-speaking community of the Kingdom of Hungary. Because of her father's death during her infancy, Zay's education was interrupted by periods where she taught to earn money in order to continue private and formal studies. In 1880 after studying abroad in Vienna and Gotha, she passed her primary education certification for Germany and Hungary. The following year, she was certified as a secondary teacher, becoming the first Transylvanian woman to have earned a higher education. From 1875 to 1884, she taught at the Institute of Irma Keméndy in Szeged.

After almost a decade in Szeged, Zay accepted a post at a newly established normal school for training kindergarten teachers in Kronstadt (Brassó). Though ostensibly a teacher, from the beginning Zay was the creative force behind the development of the school and designed the syllabus. She led the school from 1884 to 1927, becoming its official director in 1922. Simultaneously with her relocation to Kronstadt, Zay joined the General Women's Association of the Transylvanian Evangelical Church and became one of the leaders in pressing for women's rights. She successfully agitated for kindergarten and handicraft teachers to be recognized as educators and entitled to pensions. She lobbied for the teaching profession to be opened to women, which was accomplished in 1901, and for a women's normal school to be established, which occurred in 1903.

Zay wrote books on the theory of child education which were distributed throughout Hungary and Germany and used as training texts until World War II. Having made contact during her studies abroad with international feminists, Zay pressed for women to be given the right to vote. In 1918, her campaign resulted in women gaining the ability to vote in church elections. She founded the Freie Sächsische Frauenbund (Free Saxon Women's League) in 1920 as an umbrella organization to help women agitate for socio-political rights from the Kingdom of Romania, under whose jurisdiction Transylvania fell after the conclusion of World War I. In the 1920s, she served as a member of parliament and a member of the District Committee for the People's Council of Burzenland. She remained active in educational and political movements until her death in 1928.

== Early life ==
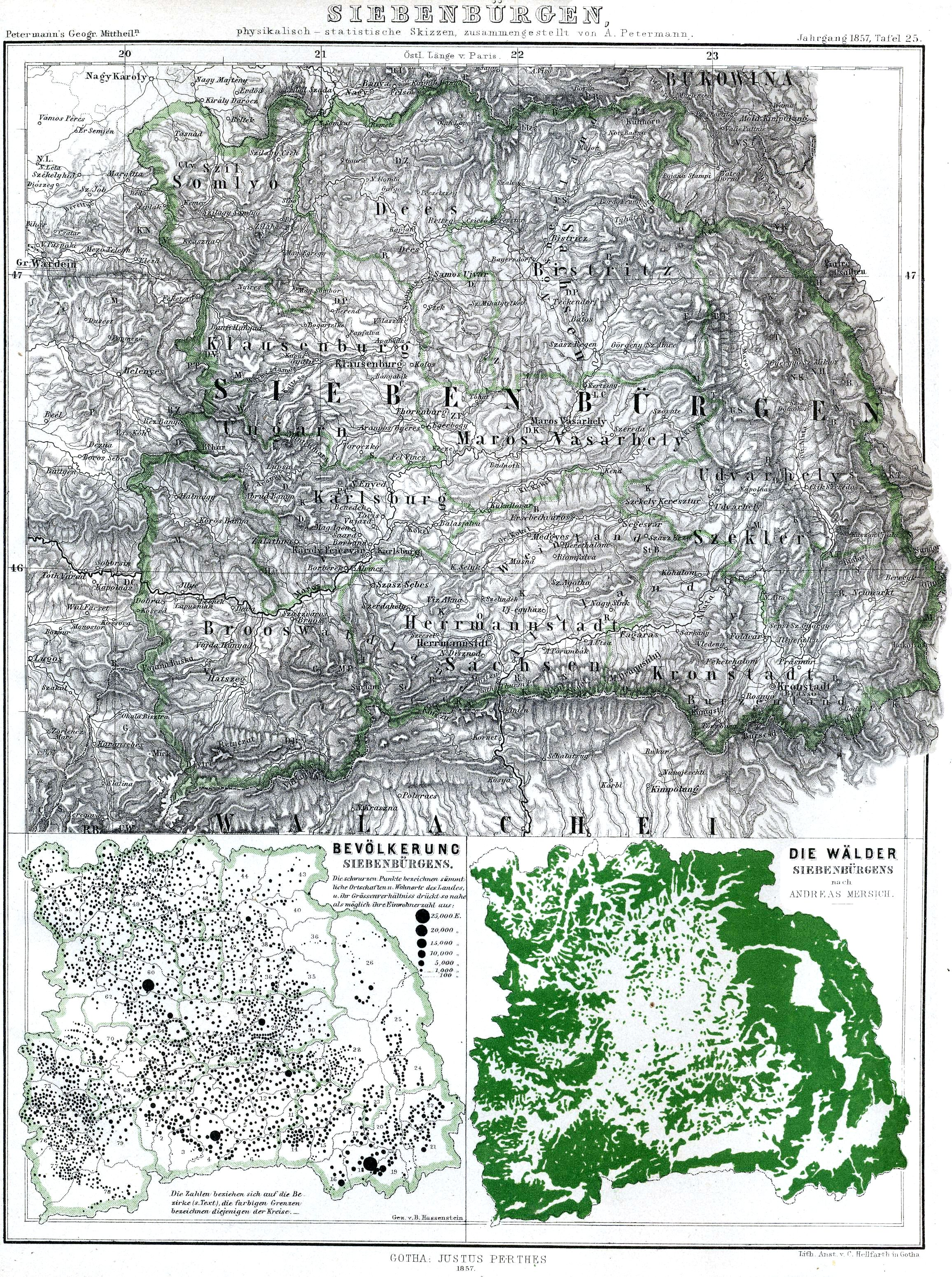
19th century Principality of Transylvania

Adele Zay was born on leap day 1848 in Hermannstadt, in the Principality of Transylvania, Austrian Empire (today Sibiu, Romania) to Rosa (née Graef) and Daniel Adolf Zay. Her family was Transylvanian-Saxon, part of the ethnically-German, Lutheran population which had been invited by the Hungarian king to settle in Transylvania from the 12th century. The German communities in which they lived maintained political autonomy from the 17th to the last quarter of the 19th century. She was the fourth daughter in the family and had a younger brother, Gustav Adolf "Adolf", who would become a lawyer and Hungarian parliamentarian. Her father was High Court Judge for the regional court, but he died shortly after Adolf's birth in 1850. He left his wife only a small pension, which was inadequate for educating her children. Zay, who aspired to become a teacher, attended the Protestant girls' school and supplemented her education with private lessons in languages and natural sciences.

== Career ==
=== Early career (1865–1884) ===
By the age of 17, Zay had begun tutoring and within three years was teaching French and German at the Mädchenerziehungsanstalt von Philippine Barreaud (Philippine Barreaud Girls' Educational Institute) in Hermannstadt. When the school closed in 1873, she moved to the Cotroceni neighborhood of Bucharest and taught at the Mädchenerziehungs- und Lehrerinnenbildungsanstalt Asyl Helene (Helena Asylum Girls' Educational and Teacher Training Institute), where one of her older sisters was employed as a teacher. The Helena Asylum was an orphanage established in 1862 by Elena Cuza, the princess consort of the United Principalities of Moldavia and Wallachia. It was later operated under the patronage of Queen Elisabeth of Wied. Zay taught classes in German language, geography, and history.

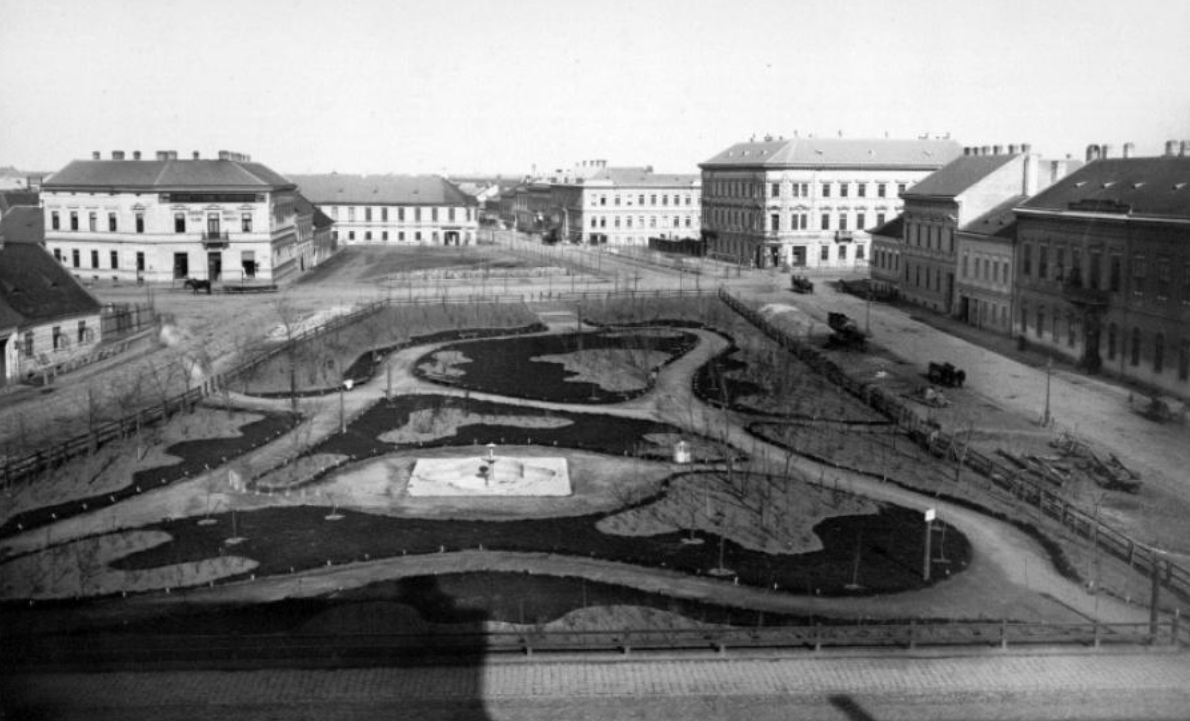
Dugonics Square, Szeged, Hungary, circa 1883–1885 (top left building on the square with a horse in front is the Institute of Irma Keméndy)

In 1875, wanting to further her education, Zay went to Vienna and took a training seminar with Friedrich Dittes, a school reformer and advocate of the Fröbel method. She also undertook private lessons in Gotha with August Köhler, an adherent of Fröbel's principals who instructed her in pedagogy. By December, Zay had secured a new post, teaching English and German languages, geography and mathematics at the Institute of Irma Keméndy in Szeged. While teaching, Zay continued her own studies at the Keméndy Institute's normal school. In 1880, she passed the examination to teach in German and Hungarian state elementary schools. The following year, she passed an additional exam at the Budapest Public Normal School to teach French and English, becoming the first Transylvanian-Saxon teacher certified to teach secondary education. She continued teaching and worked as an administrator at the Keméndy Institute until 1884, when the presbyterium of the Evangelical Church of Augsburg Confession invited her to teach in their newly established normal school for training kindergarten teachers.

=== Kronstadt (1884–1917) ===
After almost a decade in Szeged, Zay accepted the post at the Kindergärtnerinnenbildungsanstalt von der Evangelischen Landeskirche-AB (KBA-AB) (Kindergarten Teachers Training College of the Evangelical Church of Augsburg Confession) and moved to Kronstadt (Brassó). Though appointed as a classroom teacher under the headmaster, from the beginning Zay was the driving force and creative leader of the institution. As the only woman with a degree in higher education, she was entrusted with creating the syllabus, which included classes in educational and kindergarten theory, German and Hungarian languages, geography, history, and a practicum. Having been exposed to the women's movement during her studies in Germany over the previous decade, Zay joined the General Women's Association of the Transylvanian Evangelical Church upon its founding in 1884 and became one of the leaders in pressing for women's rights. In 1888, she presented a lecture Die Frau als Lehrerin (The Woman as Teacher) arguing that equal rights should be employed in the girls' schools operated by the Transylvanian Evangelical Church. She pointed out that in 1887 a proposal for hiring women teachers had been rejected based on the rationale that the Church would have to open and operate a normal school to train them.

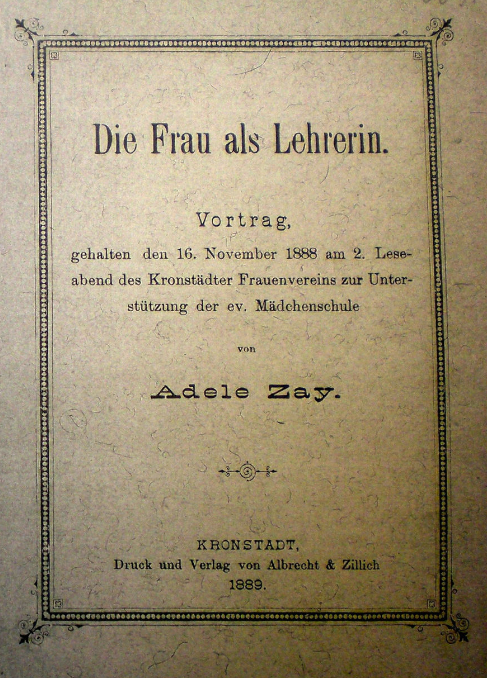
Die Frau als Lehrerin, 1889

At the 1889 National Exhibition for Infant Education in Budapest, Zay was honored with a citation for her work while the courses she taught at the school won the gold prize. Also that year, the KBA-AB curriculum was approved by the Hungarian crown and by 1891 her work and changes in the government requirements had transformed early education in Hungary. In 1892, the school was officially accredited by the state and two years later Zay designed a three-month long continuing education course to prepare caretakers for rural children, while their parents were engaged in planting and harvesting. The social work done by these caretakers, who focused on teaching children their native language and customs, built bridges between rural families and the towns where the caretakers lived. Also in 1894, she successfully appealed to the church authorities, arguing that kindergarten and handicraft teachers, who taught technical skill and helped preserve folk art but were not considered educators, should qualify for retirement pensions.

In 1896, Zay published Theorie und Praxis der Kleinkindererziehung (Theory and Practice of Infant Education), a textbook which expressed the importance of the kindergarten in children's social development. She instructed teachers to allow children to learn from supervised activity and observation, noting that playing with each other stimulated their development as members of their community. Revised and republished under the title Theorie und Praxis des Kindergartens (Theory and Practice of the Kindergarten) in 1916, the book was widely used in Germany to train teachers until the advent of World War II. In 1898, Zay published a second book, Hilfsbüchlein zur Heranbildung von Leiterinnen von Sommerbewahranstalten (Help Booklet for the Further Education of Women Leading Summer Shelters), giving practical advice for teachers to organize summer activities for children to continue their socialization. A second edition was issued in 1918.

After numerous petitions to the authorities, in 1901 Zay was finally successful in her push to open the teaching profession to women. A further success occurred when the first Transylvanian normal school for women opened in 1903 in Schäßburg (Segesvár). Having used her summers to further her own education in England, France, and Germany, Zay made contact with international feminists, like Minna Cauer and Jeanette Schwerin. She began to agitate for changes in child labor laws, called for the suppression of national rhetoric in publications and speeches, and championed the cause of equality, including suffrage for women.

=== Later career (1918–1928) ===
In the aftermath of World War I, and the Hungarian–Romanian War, the Kingdom of Romania gained jurisdiction over Transylvania. In 1918, women gained the right to vote in church elections and in 1920, Zay founded the Freie Sächsische Frauenbund (Free Saxon [i.e. German-speaking] Women's League). The umbrella organization aimed to unite ethnically-German women's groups for socio-political action within the Romanian state. Through the group, she continued to press for women's education, calling for secondary technical education for girls and introducing up-bringing and nursery-care courses at girls' high schools. She led the umbrella organization until 1925, when she was succeeded by Lotte Binder.

Elected as a member of parliament in 1920, Zay also served as a member of the District Committee for the People's Council of Burzenland. She was officially named director of the KBA-AB in 1922, holding the post until she retired in 1927. In her 43-year tenure, she had succeeded in graduating over 830 students. In 1924, Zay implemented changes to incorporate the new cultural policies required by the Romanian state, and the following year she was elected President of the Women's League. For her 80th birthday in 1928, the league organized a national fundraiser, collecting over 250,000 Romanian lei to establish the Adele Zay Foundation for the Preservation of Saxon Kindergartens.

== Death and legacy ==
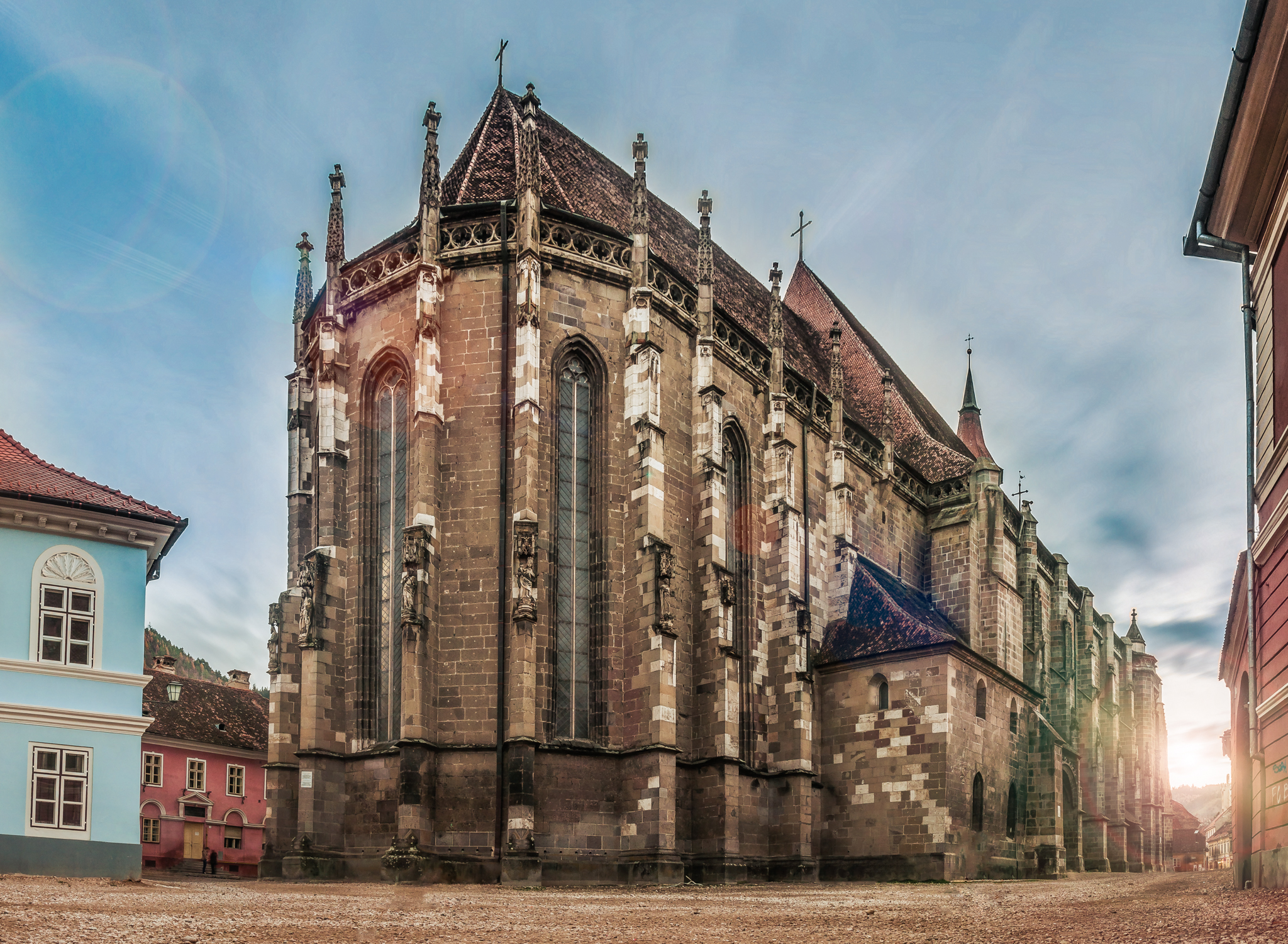
Biserica Neagra (Black Church), Brasov, Romania

Zay died on 29 December 1928 in Kronstadt, following a short illness caused by a heart attack. She was the first woman to lie in state at the Black Church there, before being buried according to her wishes at the Hermannstadt Town Cemetery. She is remembered for her contributions to professionalize teaching, for establishing kindergartens in Transylvania based upon Fröbel's principles, and for her efforts to empower women.

In 1929, the KBA-AB was renamed as the "Adele Zay School", but was dissolved by the Romanian government in 1949. The Free Saxon Women's League, founded by Zay, was renamed the German-Saxon Federation of Women in 1930. In Drabenderhöhe, Germany, a benevolent association which bears her name was founded in 1962. The association created the Haus Siebenbürgen, Alten- und Pflegeheim (Transylvania House, Old People's Home and Treatment Center) in 1966 to care for elderly Transylvanians, erecting a bust and plaque honoring Zay in the foyer. The association also established a kindergarten in 1992 and a second kindergarten in 1995, both administered by the City of Wiehl.

== Further research ==
- Neugeboren, Emil (1939). Adele Zay: Lebensbild einer deutschen Frau [Adele Zay: Life portrait of a German woman] (in German). Hermannstadt, Romania: Selbstverlag des Frauenvereins. OCLC 249576773.
