= Ciceu (disambiguation) =

Ciceu may refer to several places in Romania:

- Ciceu, a commune in Harghita County
- Ciceu-Giurgești, a commune in Bistrița-Năsăud County
- Ciceu-Mihăiești, a commune in Bistrița-Năsăud County
- Ciceu-Corabia, a village in Ciceu-Mihăiești Commune, Bistrița-Năsăud County
- Ciceu-Poieni, a village in Căianu Mic Commune, Bistrița-Năsăud County
- Cristeștii Ciceului and Hășmașu Ciceului, villages in Uriu Commune, Bistrița-Năsăud County

== People ==
- Eugen Cicero (1940–1997), born Eugen Ciceu, jazz pianist and brother of Adrian Ciceu
