= Lotte Binder =

Transylvanian pacifist feminist

- Born: 27 October 1880; Rupea, Transylvania, Austria-Hungary
- Died: 11 August 1930 (aged 49); Sibiu, Kingdom of Romania
- Occupations: Educator, women's rights activist
- Years active: 1904–1930

Lotte Binder (27 October 1880 – 11 August 1930) was an Austro-Hungarian, later Romanian teacher and women's rights activist, belonging to the Transylvanian Saxon community. As she had no access to secondary schools, her father provided her training to pass the teacher qualification examination at the local boys' school in 1904. From that year until her death, she taught at the girls' school in Mediaș. Binder became involved in women's rights and was part of the successful drive to gain women the right to vote in Transylvania. She served as chair of the Arbeitsgemeinschaft für Frauenfragen (Working Group on Women's Issues) in 1912. From 1919, she chaired the Deutsch-sächsischen Frauenvereinigung (German-Saxon Women's Association), and led the Freie Sächsische Frauenbund (Free Saxon [meaning German-speaking] Women's League) between 1925 and 1930. She was the primary representative for the Women's International League for Peace and Freedom (WILPF) in Romania from 1921 to 1926.

In addition to her teaching and activism, Binder wrote articles for various newspapers and served on the Mediaş District Committee and on the People's Council from 1920 to 1926. In 1929, she was elected to the Mediaş City Council and served on important church boards. She died unexpectedly from complications of an appendectomy. Her funerary monument at the Cimitirul Central din Sibiu (Sibiu Central Cemetery), sculpted by Margarete Depner, is one of the most known monuments in the city of Sibiu.

== Early life and education ==
Lotte Binder was born 27 October 1880 in Reps (now known as Rupea), Transylvania, Austria-Hungary, to Michael Binder and his wife. Her father, who was a pastor, was the rector of the gymnasium in Reghin. From a young age, she wanted to become a teacher, but could not afford to study abroad. Girls were not allowed to attend the German parochial schools and there was no qualification process for women teachers in Transylvania. (Note: The Școala normală de fete din Sighișoara, also known as the Sächsische Lehrerinnen-Bildungsanstalt in Schässburg (Women's Normal School of Sighișoara (Schäßburg)), the first teacher training facility to admit women, did not open until September 1904.) Her father taught Binder and her brothers, giving them basic courses and Latin. He helped her prepare in 1904 to take the teaching qualification exam at the Hermannstadt (now known as Sibiu) boys' Evangelical school.

== Career ==
=== Teaching and politics (1904–1930) ===
Binder initially taught in Rode, but by the fall of 1904 was at the girls' school in Mediaș, where she worked until her death. During her career she took economics, literature, pedagogy, and psychology courses in Germany, but financial constraints limited her ability to finish a degree. Despite that, she worked with the Institutul de Cercetări Socio-Umane Sibiu (Sibiu Socio-Human Research Institute) of the Romanian Academy on Dicționarul graiurilor săsești din Transilvania (Dictionary of Saxon Dialects from Transylvania) and carried out ethnographic and linguistic research. Binder was a delegate to the 1925 Congress of the General Association of German Female Teachers, hosted in Dresden, Germany, and the 1927 World Congress on Education, held in Locarno, Switzerland.

In 1920, Binder became a member of the Mediaș District Committee and served on the People's Council, completing a three-year term. She was re-elected to these boards in 1923 and 1926, before being elected in 1929 as a member of the Mediaș City Council. During this time, she served on the Welfare Committee of the State Church Assembly from 1926 and became a member of the consistory for the Mediaș District in 1928.

=== Activism (1912–1930) ===
Binder became involved in the women's movement and became chair of the Arbeitsgemeinschaft für Frauenfragen (Working Group on Women's Issues) in 1912. From 1919 to 1930, she chaired the Deutsch-sächsischen Frauenvereinigung (German-Saxon Women's Association). These groups joined the umbrella organization Freie Sächsische Frauenbund (Free Saxon [meaning German-speaking] Women's League), when it was formed by Adele Zay in 1920. The purpose of the Freie Sächsische Frauenbund was to provide a network for ethnically German women's groups to work together on socio-political issues within Romania. Of paramount interest to them was women's education, including technical training and childcare courses, establishing kindergartens, and teaching skills for housekeeping and caring for orphans. She attended the 1921 Vienna Congress of the Women's International League for Peace and Freedom (WILPF) and was the primary activist involved in WILPF in Romania until 1926.

In 1925, Binder became chair of the Freie Sächsische Frauenbund, succeeding Zay. That year, she also became editor-in-chief of the organizational journal Frauenblatt (Women's Paper) and began writing articles which appeared in the Siebenbürgisch-Deutsches Tageblatt (Transylvanian-German Daily Newspaper), the most significant German-language paper published in Hermannstadt through 1944. Her articles generally focused on women's rights and education. The Freie Sächsische Frauenbund successfully lobbied for women's suffrage and gained the right for educated women to vote and run in local elections. Their arguments did not focus on issues of equality but rather that allowing women to vote would help the German community, as German-speaking women typically had higher educational levels in Transylvania.

Among the international women's conferences she attended were the European Nationalities Congress (1925, Geneva), the Women's Conference on Minorities (1925, Bucharest), and the Congress of the International Council of Women (1930, Vienna). The congresses on nationality and minorities were designed to harmonize relations between different ethnic groups within Romania, which had taken over Transylvania at the end of World War I. (Note: When the Central Powers were defeated in 1918, the goal of the Allied Powers was to curtail German influence in East Central Europe. When it became evident to treaty negotiators that Austria-Hungary would collapse, the issue of what to do with its successor states became paramount. Under the terms of the Treaty of Trianon (1920) Transylvania was joined to Romania but provisions were inserted to protect ethnic minorities, such as Germans, Jews, Magyars, and Szeklers. The provisions basically provided for ethnic minorities to be granted cultural and religious autonomy, also giving them the right to preserve their traditional language and schooling models.) Problems faced by the German community after the union with Romania included curricula that were taught in Romanian, rather than in the students' native language. As a result, no medical training was available, causing a decline in German-speaking midwives and doctors for the German-speaking community. Other issues included housing discrimination, inequalities in the application of the agrarian and administrative reforms, and unequal taxation policies. Binder led a delegation of twenty-one members of the Freie Sächsische Frauenbund to attend the Women's Conference on Minorities, after the Vienna congress. The discussions there focused on how women's groups representing different ethnic minorities could work together on social welfare, rather than on the protection or violation of ethnic rights. While the congresses did not resolve the ethnic issues, they gave women a way to move forward collaboratively and resulted in a Peace and Minorities Commission being established by the Consiliului Naţional al Femeilor Române (National Council of Romanian Women).

== Death and legacy ==
Binder died on 11 August 1930 in Sibiu, Romania, following an appendectomy. The Deutsch-sächsischen Frauenvereinigung established a foundation bearing her name and donated a tomb for her in Cimitirul Central din Sibiu (Sibiu Central Cemetery). In 1934, a sculpture created by Margarete Depner was erected at the cemetery in honor of Binder. The statue has become one of the most famous funerary monuments in the city. It depicts a seated woman whose head is resting upon a raised knee. Along with Zay and Grete Teutsch, Binder is considered to be one of the main actors of the Transylvanian Germans involved in the women's and eugenics movements.
