= Johann Caspar Herterich =

German painter

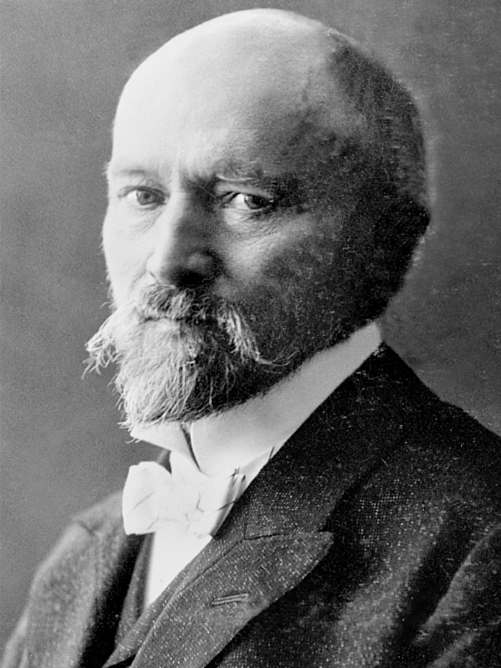
Johann Caspar Herterich (date unknown)

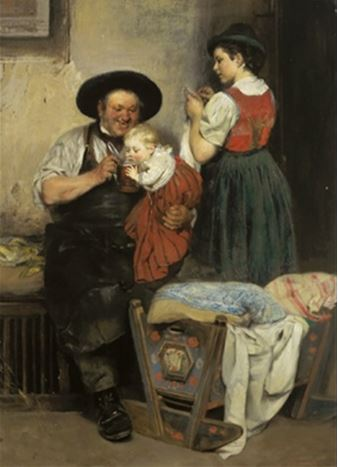
Practice Early!

Johann Caspar Herterich, sometimes known as Hans (3 April 1843 – 26 October 1905) was a German history and genre painter. He was also a popular professor at the Academy of Fine Arts, Munich.

== Life and work ==
He was the son of Franz Herterich (1798–1876), a sculptor and art restorer. His talent was recognized at an early age, so his parents sent him away to study at the age of sixteen.

After arriving in Munich in 1859, he was enrolled at the academy, where he studied with Philipp Foltz and Carl Theodor von Piloty. Under Foltz's tutelage, he created his first major painting in 1867: a scene from the version of Frithiof's Saga by Esaias Tegnér. This was followed by a dramatic scene depicting Margaret of Thuringia being cast out of her home, and one of Doctor Joseph-Ignace Guillotin, demonstrating the invention that would be named after him. By the mid-1870s, he had added sentimental genre scenes of domestic life to his repertoire. Later, he became active in the Arts and Crafts movement; designing chandeliers and other decorative pieces in collaboration with Adolf Halbreiter.

He became an assistant professor at the Munich Academy in 1882, and succeeded Gyula Benczúr as a full professor of "painting from nature" in 1884. During his tenure, he trained hundred of students who appreciated his sympathetic nature and strong work ethic. He was not averse to leisure time, however, and helped plan several events, including a large garden festival at Lustheim in 1890.

In 1903, he began to suffer from health problems that eventually required the amputation of his right foot. The operation was successful and had no effect on his work, but his overall health improved little. Two years later, while preparing for an academic meeting, he experienced extreme discomfort while climbing his stairs. Shortly after, he was diagnosed with "cardiac paralysis" and died. A retrospective exhibition was held by the Kunstverein München.

His best known students included Max Doerner, Kaspar Schleibner, Maximilian Reinitz, Daniel Israel, Friedrich Miess, Carl August Liner, Lajos Márk, Roman Kramsztyk, Alexander Eckener, Benno Elkan, Iosif Iser, Leonid Pasternak, Josip Račić, and Max Slevogt. His younger brother, Ludwig, also became a painter.

== Sources ==
- Herterich, Hans. In: Hermann Alexander Müller: Biographisches Künstler-Lexikon. Verlag des Bibliographischen Instituts, Leipzig 1882
- Hyacinth Holland: "Herterich, Johann". In: Biographisches Jahrbuch und deutscher Nekrolog. Vol.10, 1905, G. Reimer, Berlin 1907, pp. 180–181 (Online)
- Katalog der Kgl. Neuen Pinakothek in München. Neue Pinakothek, Bruckmann, 1913, p. 55.
- Paul Pfisterer, Claire Pfisterer: Signaturenlexikon. Walter de Gruyter, Berlin 1999, p. 295 ISBN 978-3-11-014937-1
