= Irma Keméndy =

Hungarian school teacher (1838–1912)

- Born: Irma Mária Drucker; 10 April 1838; Pest, Kingdom of Hungary, Austrian Empire
- Died: 19 March 1912 (aged 73); Szeged, Austria-Hungary
- Other names: Irma Keméndy-Drucker
- Occupation: teacher
- Years active: 1858–1900

Irma Keméndy (10 April 1838 – 19 March 1912) was a Hungarian teacher who operated a girls' boarding school, and later a high school in Szeged. She opened one of the first normal schools in the area and taught for over 40 years in Hungary. She was the recipient of the Golden Crowned Cross of Merit of Austria-Hungary, in recognition of her social contributions.

== Early life ==
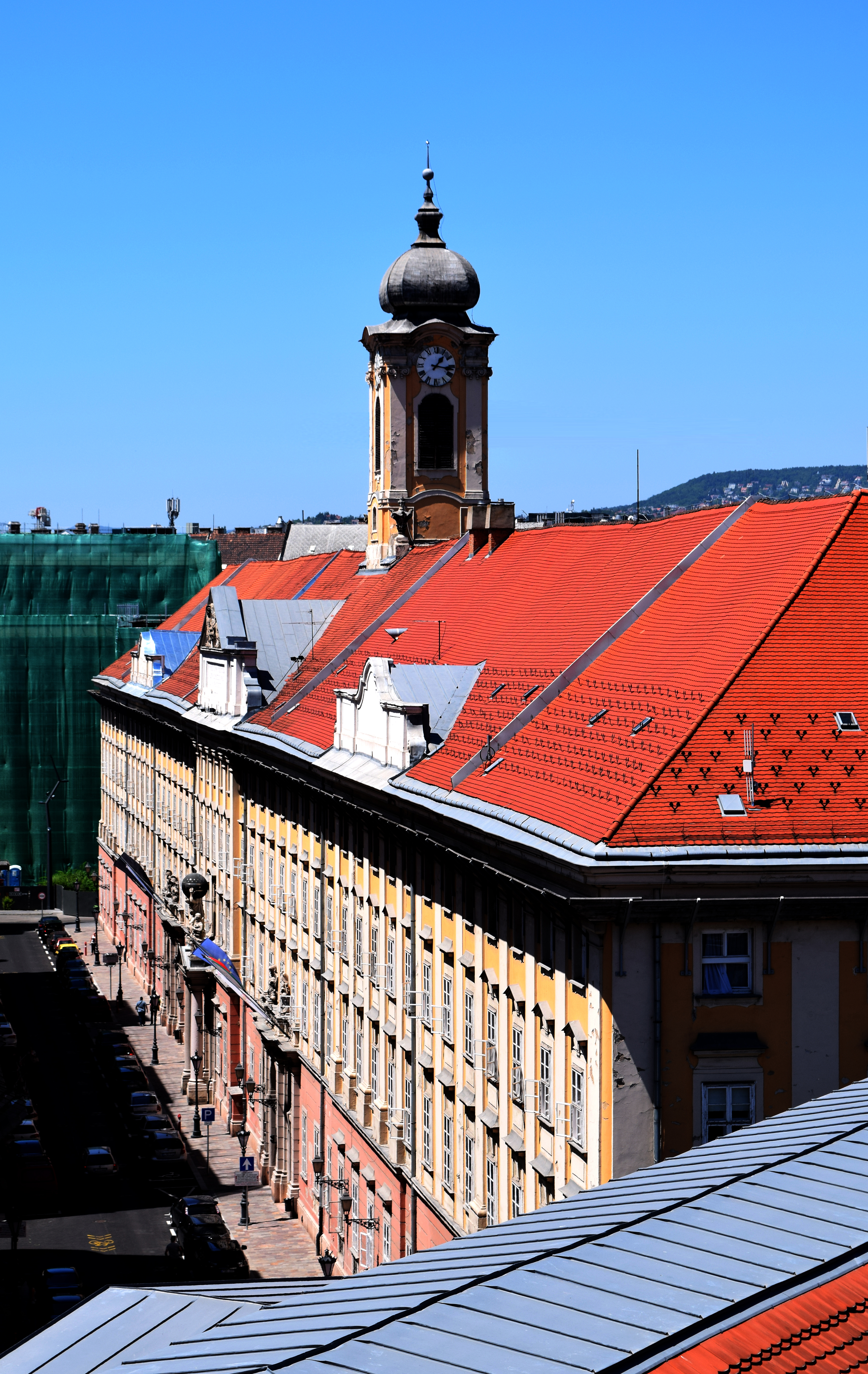
Budapest City Hall, formerly the Károly Barracks Hospital

Irma Mária Drucker was born on 10 April 1838 at the Károly Barracks Hospital, now the building housing the Budapest City Hall, during the great flood in Pest, Kingdom of Hungary, Austrian Empire. She was the daughter of József Drucker, and sister of József Jr., a lawyer and mayor of several Hungarian cities, including Szeged, Székesfehérvár, and Sopron. After completing her primary education in Pest, Drucker attended the normal school, Sancta Maria Intézetének (Institute of Saint Mary) run by the Congregation of Jesus in Budapest, graduating in 1858.

== Career ==
Shortly after graduating, Drucker took a post as a teacher at the private school of Izabella Malocsay in Szeged, where she worked until 1862. Her brother had become the mayor of Szeged and introduced Drucker to the widower Nándor Keméndy (née Ferdinánd Gebhardt), whose first wife had died in 1859. On 12 May 1861, the couple married and the following year their son Béla was born. On 1 September 1862, Keméndy opened a private girls' boarding school in her home to teach first to fourth grade students.

In 1863, Keméndy relocated the boarding school to Sziráky House at 2 Kelemen Street and a year later, it moved to Korona Street. The school was very popular among the upper classes of the town and attracted wide attendance, sometimes reaching over 100 pupils in a single term. By 1869, she expanded the curricula to include both fifth and sixth terms and was attracting students from Serbian and German communities in the southern part of the country. In 1875, she added a three-year normal school to train women teachers. She relocated her residence and the boarding school to 77 Tisza Lajos Boulevard and the normal school operated around the corner on Subotica Avenue. In December, Adele Zay joined Keméndy's staff as a teacher of geography, English and German languages, and mathematics and would remain there until 1884.

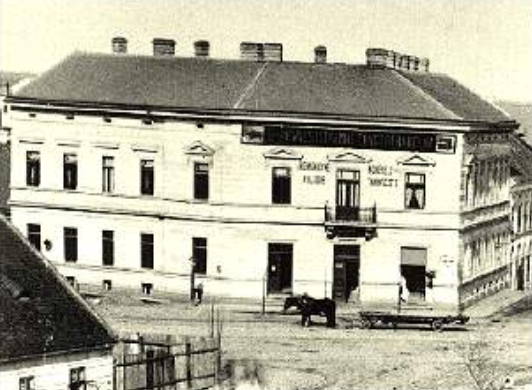
Keméndy House and School, circa 1883-1885

Ruined in the 1879 flood, in 1881, Keméndy applied for a building permit to reconstruct a building on the corner lot of Tisza Lajos Boulevard and Subotica Avenue. Various merchant shops operated on the ground floor, while the school and residence was located on the second level. She reopened the boarding and secondary school in May 1882, on Subotica in Dugonics Square, but was unable to reorganize the normal school at that time. In 1887, Keméndy founded an industrial training school for girls and gained the patronage of the local women's association to help with funding for the school. In 1900, she was able to reopen the teacher training school, but soon after retired, because of failing health and increasing blindness.

In addition to her teaching and organizing women's education facilities, Keméndy was involved in various social and benevolent societies, including the Women's Beneficial Association and the Austro-Hungarian Red Cross. When the nursery school in the city center was destroyed, Keméndy pressed for it to be rebuilt and worked to help found a kindergarten in the Rókus neighborhood of Szeged. She was very involved in extracurricular educational activities sponsored by the Catholic Church and the Youth Association. She was recognized by King Franz Joseph I with the Golden Crowned Cross of Merit for her social work and charitable contributions.

== Death and legacy ==
Keméndy died on 19 March 1912 at her home in Szeged. Her obituary praised her for having nurtured generations of students and recognized her long involvement in benevolent work in Szeged. In 1943, János Drucker published Mór Jókai Levelei Keméndyné Drucker Irmához (Mór Jókai's Letters to Irma Keméndy-Drucker), which contained a historical overview of Keméndy's pioneering role in developing educational standards and facilities. Over 60 years after her death, her contributions to Szeged were recalled in an article by László Péter published in the regional journal, Délmagyarország.
