= János Greguss =

Hungarian painter

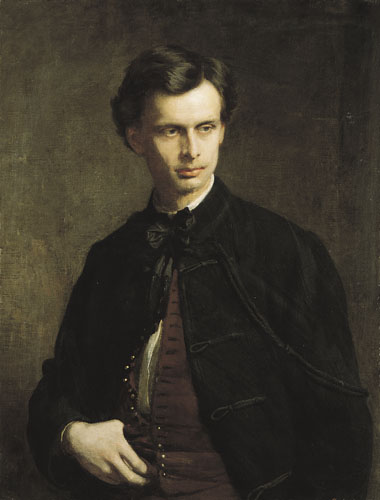
- Born: Johann Baptist Gregosch; May 3, 1838; Pozsony, Kingdom of Hungary (now Bratislava, Slovakia)
- Died: May 31, 1892 (aged 54); Budapest, Kingdom of Hungary
- Education: Nuremberg Academy of Fine Arts, Munich Polytechnic University of Vienna
- Known for: Painting
- Notable work: In the Kitchen; Realistic landscapes of Lake Balaton
- Movement: Academic art
- Awards: Stipend by József Eötvös

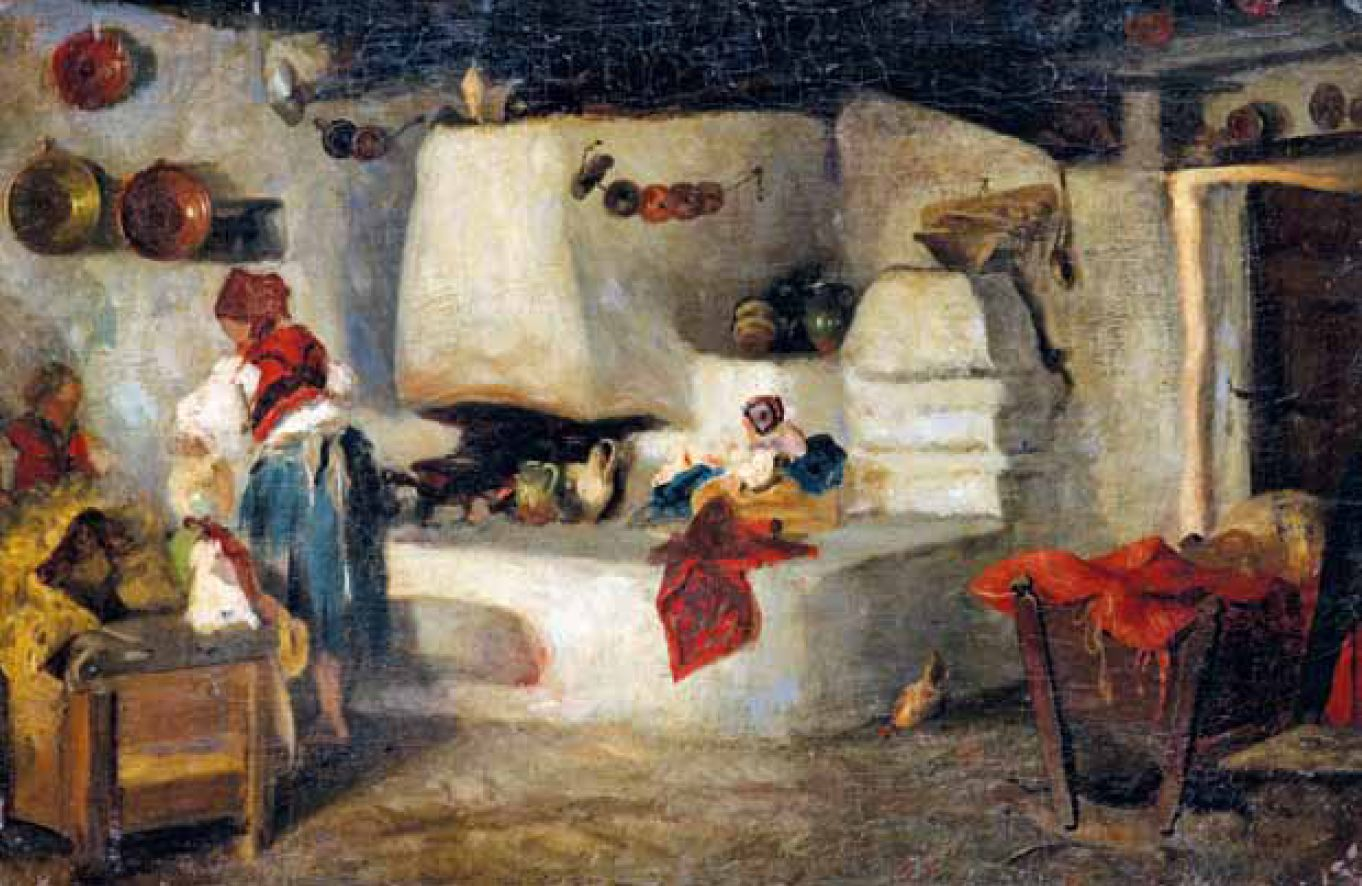
In the Kitchen

János Greguss (German: Johann Baptist Gregosch; 3 May 1838, Pozsony- 31 May 1892, Budapest) was a Hungarian genre and landscape painter. He was also a popular art teacher.

== Biography ==
After studies in Nuremberg and at the Academy of Fine Arts, Munich, he studied at the Polytechnic University in Vienna. Following his graduation, he was awarded a stipend by József Eötvös that enabled him to study abroad.

Upon his return, he was appointed as a teacher at the Royal Drawing School. He painted with a loosely Academic approach and was heavily influenced by German art. In terms of subject matter, he tended to prefer simple, cheerful scenes; mostly from family life. In his later years, he created some realistic landscapes. His favorite areas in which to paint were those around Lake Balaton.

In addition to his art, he created illustrations for the works of Sándor Petőfi and was a regular contributor to Vasárnapi Ujság (The Sunday News), an illustrated weekly newspaper.

Among his best known students were Lipót Ács, Adolf Fényes, Lajos Márk and János Tornyai.

Many of his works may be seen at the Hungarian National Museum.

== Sources ==
- Biographical notes @ Budapest Aukcio
