= Petru Rareș, Bistrița-Năsăud =

Petru Rareș
- Commune
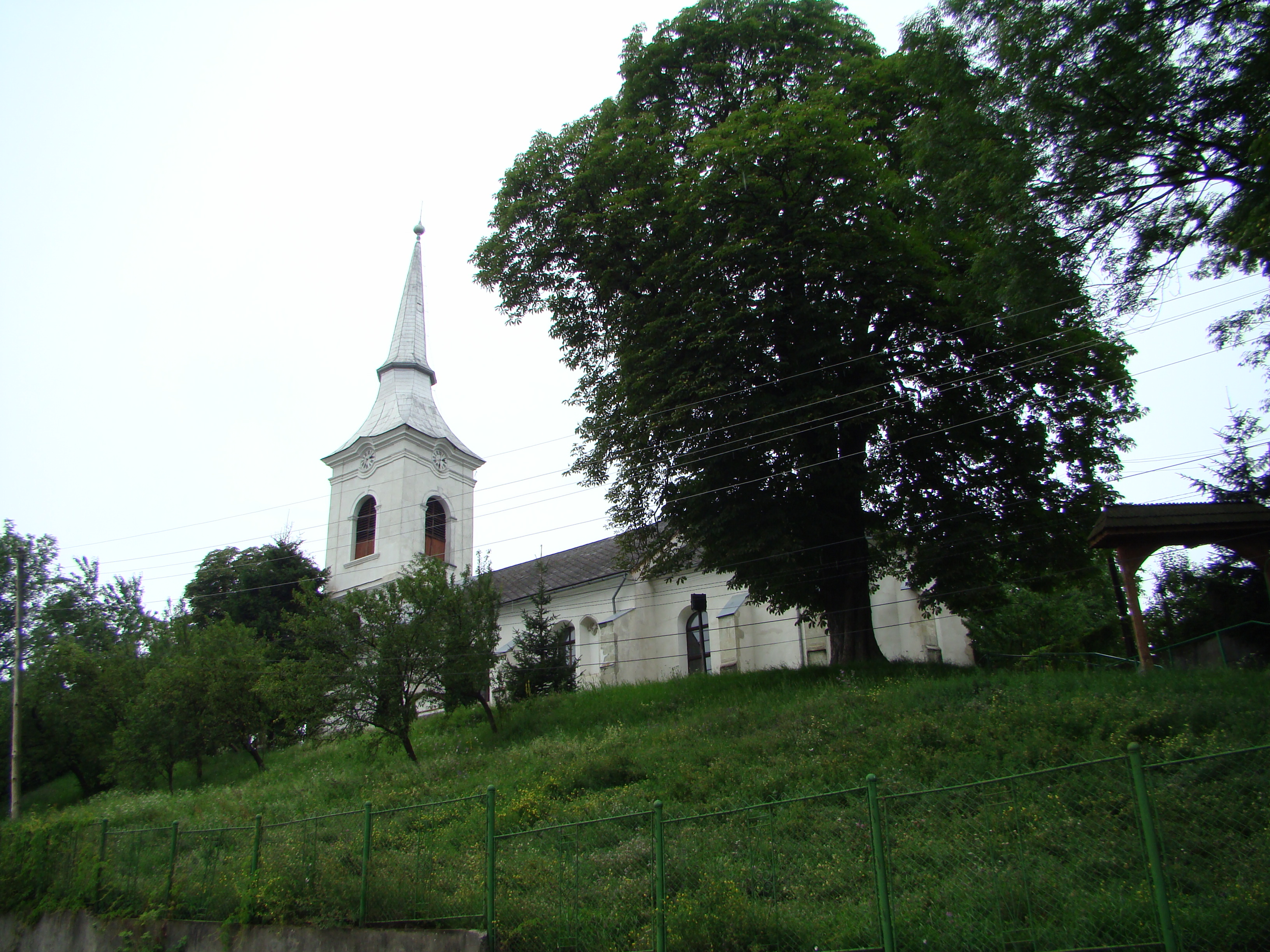
- Calvinist church in Reteag village

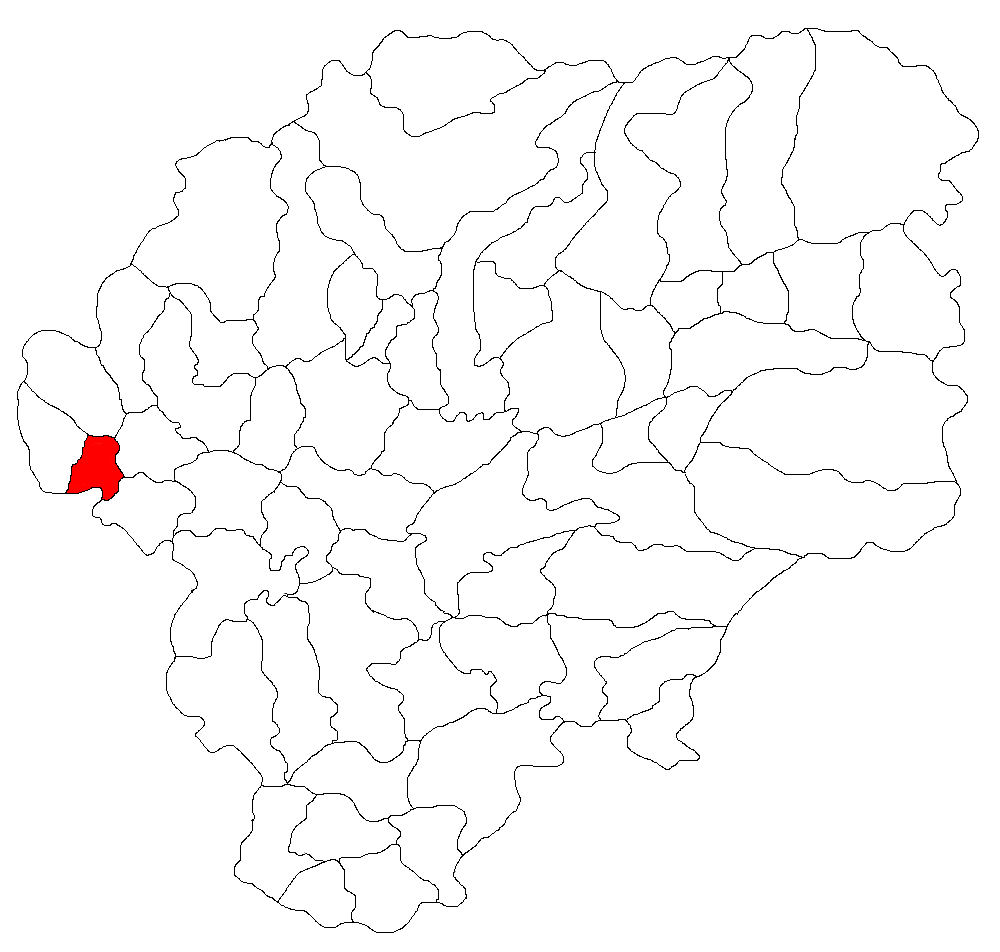
- Location in Bistrița-Năsăud County

- Location in Romania
- Coordinates: 47°11′45″N 24°01′07″E
- Country: Romania
- County: Bistrița-Năsăud

Government
  - Mayor (2020–2024): Ionel Ropan (PNL)
- Area: 30.08 km^{2} (11.61 sq mi)
- Elevation: 248 m (814 ft)
- Population (2021-12-01): 3,399
  - Density: 113.0/km^{2} (292.7/sq mi)
- Time zone: UTC+02:00 (EET)
  - Summer (DST): UTC+03:00 (EEST)
- Postal code: 427216/427220
- Area code: +40 x59
- Vehicle reg.: BN
- Website: www.primaria-petrurares.ro

Petru Rareș is a commune in Bistrița-Năsăud County, Transylvania, Romania. It is composed of two villages, Bața (Baca) and Reteag (the commune centre; Hungarian: Retteg; German: Retteneck or Reckenteck or Reckendorf).

It also included Ciceu-Mihăiești, Ciceu-Corabia and Lelești villages until 2005, when these were split off to form Ciceu-Mihăiești Commune.

Named after Petru Rareș (voivode of Moldavia in the 16th century), the commune lies on the Transylvanian Plateau, on the right bank of the Someșul Mare River. It is located in the western part of the county, on the border with Cluj County, at a distance of 14 km (8.7 mi) from the town of Beclean and 45 km (28 mi) from the county seat, Bistrița; the city of Dej is 14 km to the west, in Cluj County.

At the 2011 census, Petru Rareș had a population of 3,351. According to the census, 53.21% of inhabitants are Romanians, 25.75% Roma, and 17.1% Hungarians.

== Natives ==
- Lajos Márk (1867–1942), Hungarian painter
- Ion Pop-Reteganul (1853–1905), Romanian teacher and writer
