= Daniel Israel =

Austrian painter (1859–1901)

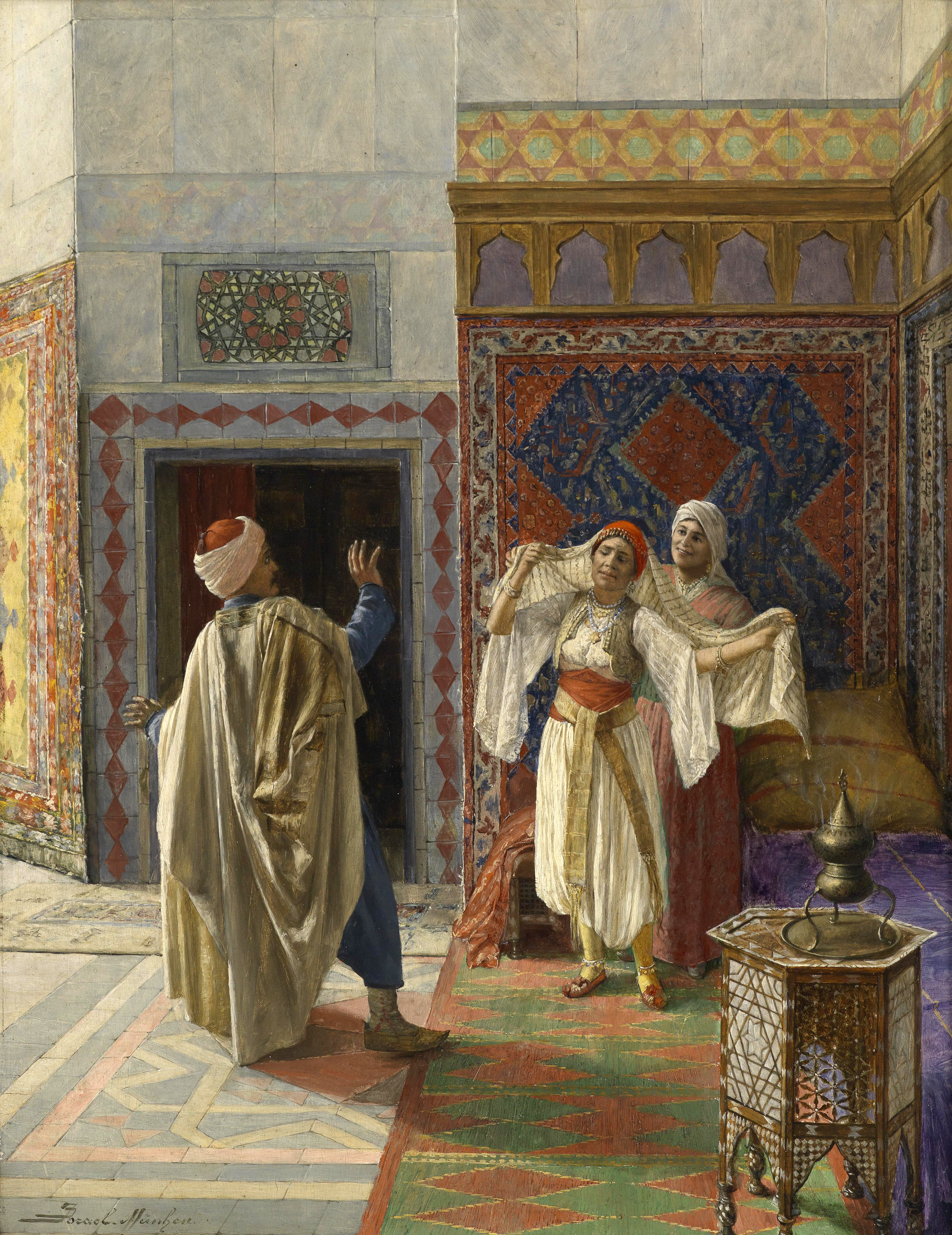
Surprised

Daniel Israel (2 January 1859, Vienna - 24 April 1901, Vienna) was a painter from the Austro-Hungarian Empire who specialized in Orientalist scenes.

== Biography ==
He was initially employed as a businessman then, from 1878 to 1882, he studied at the Academy of Fine Arts Vienna. This was followed by studies at the Academy of Fine Arts, Munich from 1882 to 1885. His primary instructors there were Johann Caspar Herterich and Otto Seitz.

In 1885, after graduating, he took an extended trip through the Balkans, to Turkey, Palestine and Egypt; making numerous sketches that he would use for oil paintings back in his Munich studio. His works included landscapes, cityscapes and genre scenes.

From 1893 to 1899, he participated in exhibitions in Budapest and the Munich Glaspalast as well as in his native Vienna.

He became mentally ill and spent his last two years in a sanatorium.

== Sources ==
- "Israel Daniel". In: Österreichisches Biographisches Lexikon 1815–1950 (ÖBL). Vol. 3, Austrian Academy of Sciences, Vienna 1965, p. 44.
