= Lajos Márk =

Hungarian artist (1867–1942)

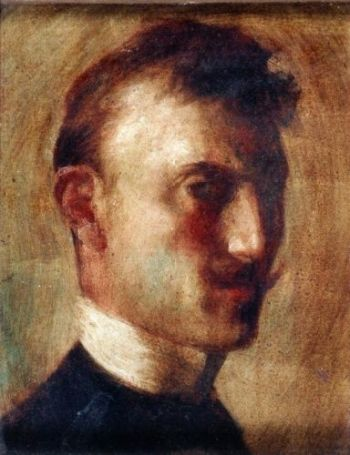
Self-portrait (date unknown)

Lajos Márk, also known as Louis Marc (25 August 1867, Reteag – 18 March 1942, New York City) was a Hungarian painter, illustrator and poster artist.

== Biography ==
His father, Márkus Márk, was an economist. After an education in Jesuit and Piarist schools, his artistic talents led his father to enroll him in the Hungarian Royal Drawing School in 1885, where he studied with Izsó Köves, János Greguss and Bertalan Székely. After six months, he moved to Munich, where he studied at the private school operated by Simon Hollósy. He also took preparatory courses with Johann Caspar Herterich at the Academy of Fine Arts.

Rather than become a full-time student there, he went to Paris and entered the Académie Julian, where he studied for an additional two years with Tony Robert-Fleury and William Bouguereau. He returned to Budapest in 1890, to perform his mandatory military service. Between 1892 and 1897, he further developed his skills at the master's school run by Gyula Benczúr.

By 1910, he was sufficiently well known as a portrait painter to receive an invitation from the National Arts Club of New York to come to the United States. He would stay there until 1921, but kept in close touch with his homeland. In 1912, he married Rózsával Molnár, from Győr, who was a student of the acting teacher, Szidi Rákosi. At the outbreak of World War I, he went to enlist, but the Austro-Hungarian Ambassador, Konstantin Dumba, rejected his offer, due to his age and the nature of his work. He and Rózsával never applied for American citizenship.

After returning to Hungary, he began to exhibit widely throughout Europe. He also began to create book illustrations for works by Endre Nagy, József Kiss, Kálmán Mikszáth, Ferenc Molnár, Ferenc Herczeg, Jenő Heltai and many others.

He was also a member of several professional organizations. In 1928, to help alleviate the financial problems being experienced by new artists, he and Béla Lázár established the Munkácsy-guild, of which he became the first president. In 1929, the guild began operating in the United States.

In 1938, he and his family went to New York; ostensibly to help organize an exhibition of Hungarian art. Due to the worsening political situation in Europe, they stayed. He maintained a studio there, on West 57th Street, until his death from a heart attack in 1942.

Many of his works disappeared or were destroyed during World War II. Today, in addition to the Hungarian National Museum and the Hungarian National Gallery, his works may be seen at the Brooklyn Museum and the Albright-Knox Art Gallery in Buffalo.

== Selected works ==
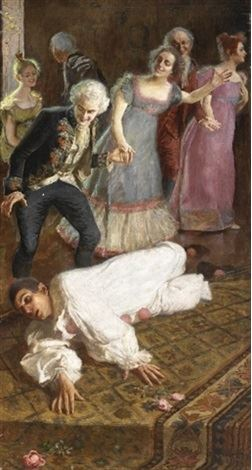
Rococo Scene, with Pierrot

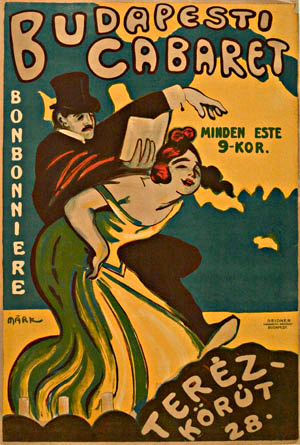
Poster for the
Budapest Cabaret

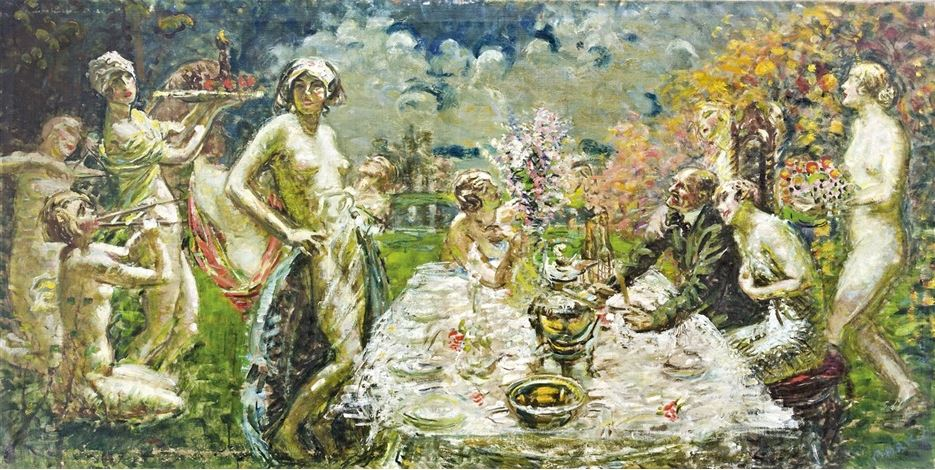
Birthday

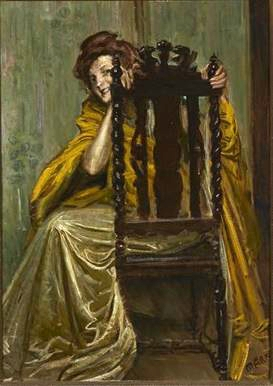
Elegant Lady in a Jacobean Chair

== Sources ==
- The Life and Works of Lajos Márk, by Anna Tüskés, Studies from the Past in Budapest @ REAL
- Orosz Péter: Márk Lajos festőművész élete és munkássága. Duna Palota Kulturális Kht. Budapest, 2007. ISBN 978-963-8036-98-8
