= János Mattis-Teutsch =

Transylvanian painter, sculptor, graphic artist, art critic and poet

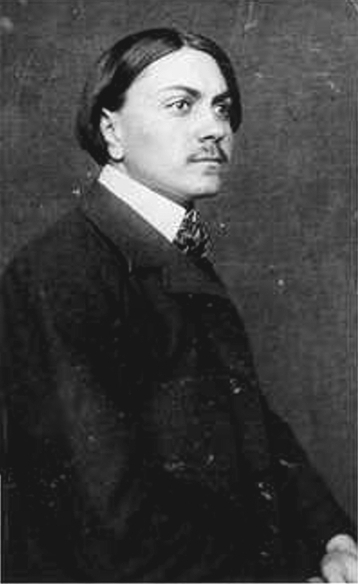
- Born: 13 August 1884; Brassó (Braşov), Kingdom of Hungary, Austria-Hungary
- Died: 17 March 1960 (aged 76); Braşov, Socialist Republic of Romania
- Education: Franz Stuck
- Known for: painting, sculpture, linocut
- Notable work: Seelenblumen
- Movement: Post-Impressionism; Fauvism; Expressionism; Abstract art Baia Mare School; Surrealism; Socialist realism

János Mattis-Teutsch, also spelled Máttis-Teutsch and Mátis-Teutsch ([ˈjaːnoʃ ˈmɒtːiʃ ˈtʰɔʏ̯t͡ʃ]; 13 August 1884 – 17 March 1960) was a Hungarian painter, sculptor, graphic artist, art critic, and poet. Best known for his Seelenblumen ("Soulflowers") cycle of paintings, he was an important contributor to the development of modern art and avant-garde trends inside Romania (where he spent the larger part of his life). He was the grandfather of the artist Waldemar Mattis-Teutsch.

== Biography ==
He was born in the Transylvanian city of Brassó (Braşov), then part of the Kingdom of Hungary within Austria-Hungary, now part of Romania. He was the son of János Mátis, an ethnic Hungarian of Székely origins, and his wife, the Saxon Josefin Schneider. After Mátis died during his son's early years, Josefin married the Saxon Friedrich Teutsch, who adopted János. He completed primary school in Hungarian, and then attended the German-language Honterus Secondary School; between 1901 and 1903, he studied sculpture at the National Hungarian Royal School for Applied Arts in Budapest, and then left for Munich, where he attended the Royal Academy of Fine Arts, and Paris — during the period, Mattis-Teutsch appears to have moved from Art Nouveau to Post-Impressionist and Fauvist themes, and eventually embraced Die Brücke and Der Blaue Reiter ideas.

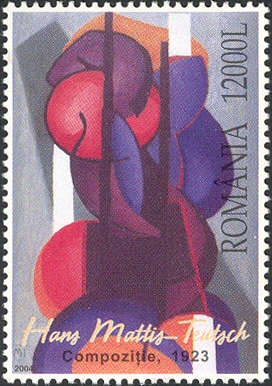
Composition, 1923

Soon after his return from France in 1908, Mattis-Teutsch began teaching at the State Woodwork School, and replaced János Kupcsay as professor ("scholar master") in 1910. He married Gisella Borsos in 1909 (their wedding caused scandal, since she had broken off her engagement to someone else). A member of the artists' group known as the Sebastian Hann Verein, keeping close contacts with local artists such as Friedrich Miess, Gusztáv Kollár, Gyula Tutschek, Hermann Morres, Fritz Kimmel, and Hans Eder, he exhibited his first sculptures during a joint show in Pest (1910), and then in a Gyula Vastagh-organized exhibit in his native town (1914).

He became an acquaintance of Lajos Kassák, and published linocut drawings in the modern art magazine MA (Tájkép fával – "Landscape with a Tree", 1917; Kompozíció két alakkal – "Composition with Two Figures", 1919), as well as contributing to the joint exhibits the latter organized, before being showcased in Vienna and establishing connections with Herwarth Walden and his Expressionist group around Der Sturm — eventually, he adopted the style, continuing to be directly influenced by the abstract art of Wassily Kandinsky and Kazimir Malevich, and moving towards a non-figurative outlook. His success was contrasted by an emotional crisis caused by the death of his wife in 1916; he remarried with Marie Conrad, an Austrian woman, in 1919.

Present in Budapest at the time of the Aster Revolution, Mattis-Teutsch probably witnessed first hand the establishment of the Hungarian Soviet Republic; despite conflicting accounts and his socialist creed, it seems that he was not involved in the pro-Bolshevik movement. He remained a committed anti-Fascist, and later spoke out against the influence of Nazism inside the Transylvanian Saxon community (see German Party (Romania)).

He was present in Transylvania by mid-1919, and organized several exhibitions; as the region became part of the Romanian Kingdom and, for a while, his teaching position was being reconsidered by the new authorities, he planned to relocate to Germany, before deciding to remain present in Romanian artistic life, and to regularly participate in art shows in Bucharest and throughout Transylvania. Active inside the Contimporanul group in Bucharest (with Victor Brauner, M. H. Maxy, and Marcel Janco) and with Das Ziel in Braşov, Mattis-Teutsch was immediately hailed by modernist critics (including Nicolae Tonitza, Otto Bratskoven, Sigmund Maur, Lucian Blaga, Károly Kós, Eugen Jebeleanu, and Ernő Ligeti). His works were presented at the 1924 international exhibition organized by Contimporanul, alongside those of Kurt Schwitters, Paul Klee, Constantin Brâncuși (whom Mattis-Teutsch had already met in person), Hans Arp, Janco, Brauner, and Maxy.

Later on, he returned to figurative art, an interest which he fused with his socialist beliefs in an attempt to create a socially-aware art (as defined by his Kunstideologie, "Ideology of Painting", a magazine he edited in Braşov). After the Contimporanul moment, he joined the editorial staff of Integral, and defined his new style, considered to be close to Surrealism, as "constructive realism". Although he was among the painters who spent summers in Baia Mare (see Baia Mare School), Mattis-Teutsch never adapted his themes to the landscape art encouraged by the group, and remained mainly interested in social themes.

The 1933 death of his daughter and political factors caused him to cease work until the 1940s. At the end of World War II, with the onset of the Soviet occupation and, eventually, the establishment of the communist regime, his earlier work was subject to propaganda attacks while he attempted to adapt to the themes of Socialist realism, creating portraits of Joseph Stalin and Stakhanovite scenes featuring bricklayers and miners.
