= Maximilian Reinitz =

Austrian Cubist painter

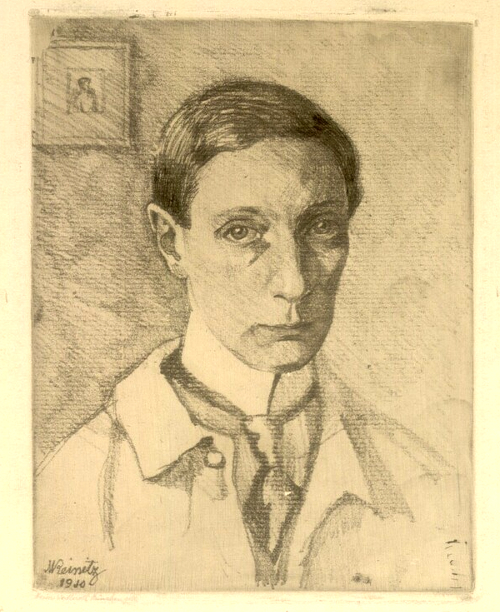
Self-portrait (1920)

Maximilian Reinitz (29 October 1872, Vienna – 25 September 1935, Vienna) was an Austrian Cubist painter; associated with the Neue Sachlichkeit (New Objectivity) movement.

== Biography ==
His interest in art came relatively late. From 1898 to 1902, he studied at the Academy of Fine Arts, Munich; initially with the genre painter, Johann Caspar Herterich, then with Johann's brother Ludwig von Herterich, Carl von Marr and the engraver, Peter Halm.

Upon completing his studies, he traveled throughout the region; visiting Budapest, Dresden and Berlin. He also undertook study trips to Italy and Albania. After 1914, he returned to Vienna and became a member of the Hagenbund.

Although he was primarily a Cubist painter, he supported most of the modern trends in European art. His showing at the Frühlings-Ausstellung (Spring Exhibition) of 1922 aroused such a torrent of negative reviews from conservative critics that he withdrew from the art community.

He was apparently riddled with self-doubt and suffered periods of severe depression. Much of his life was spent in seclusion and little is known about him or his activities, outside of his showings. His works were rediscovered many years after his death.

== Selected paintings ==
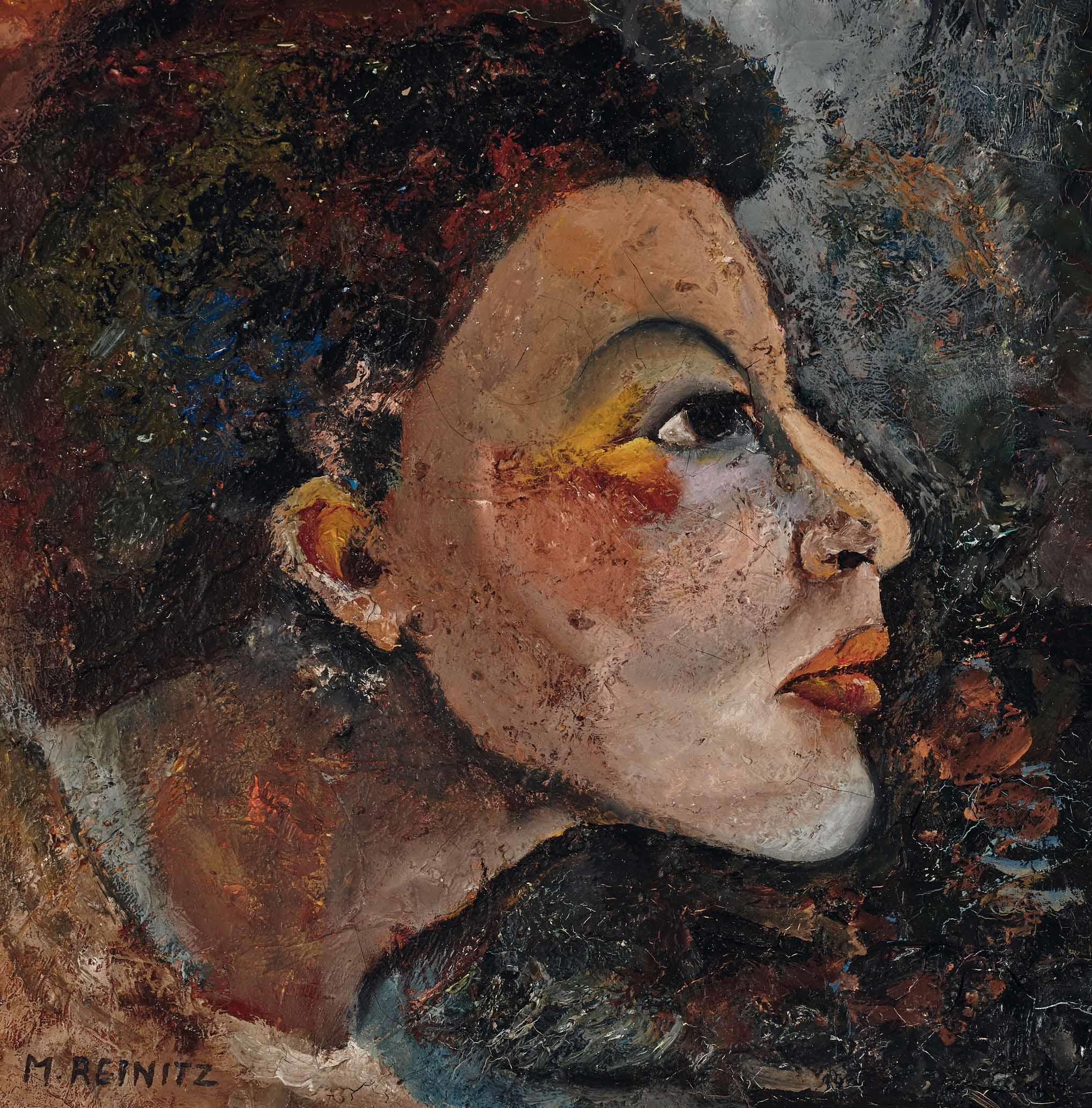
Portrait of a Woman

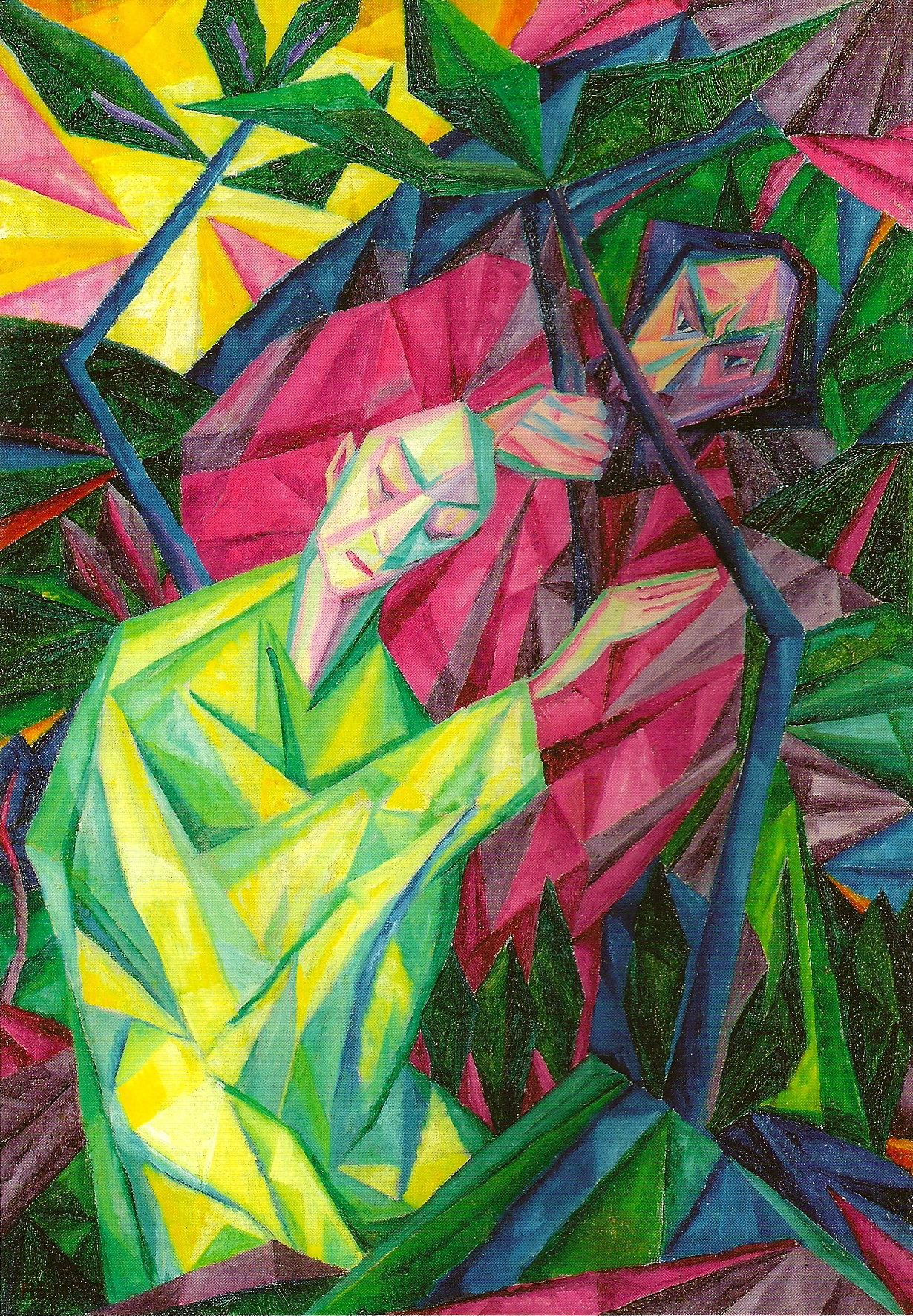
Buddha and
the Bandit

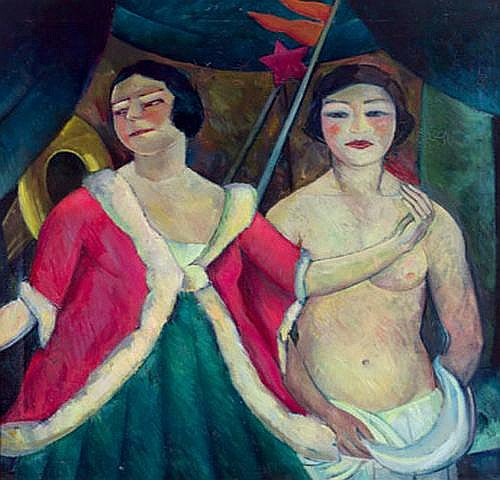
A Grand Gesture

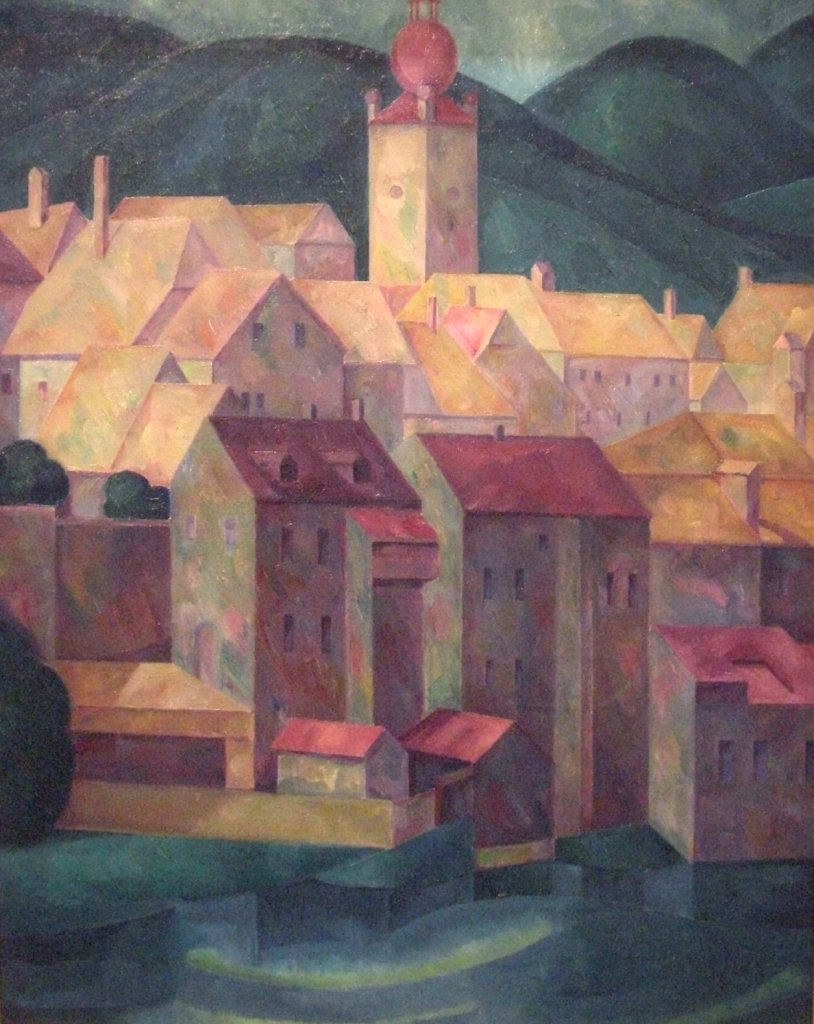
Waidhofen an der Ybbs

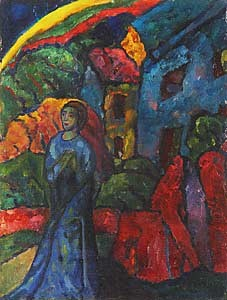
Hope
