= Carl Walter Liner =

Swiss painter (1914–1997)

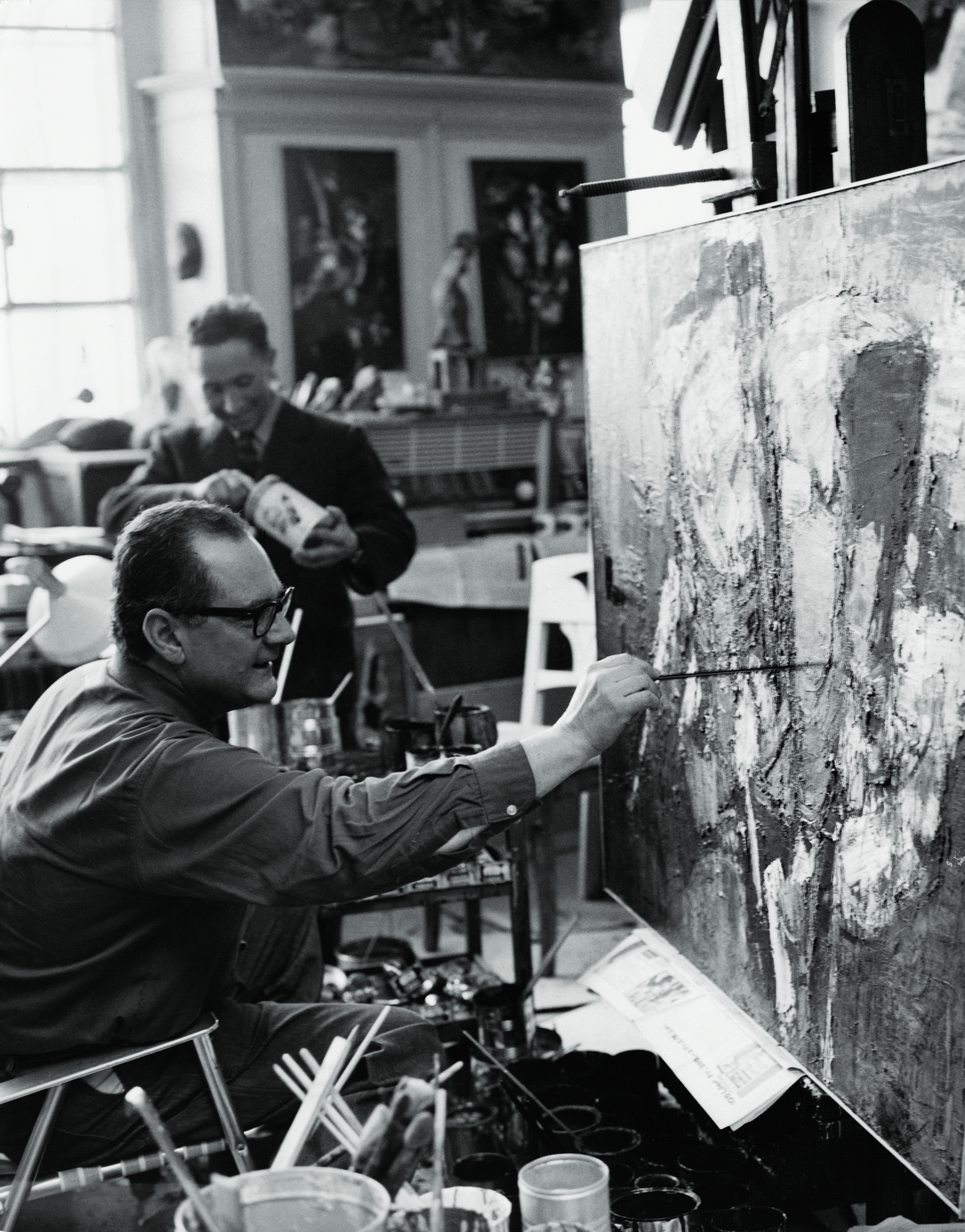
- Liner in his Appenzell studio, c. 1955
- Born: 17 August 1914; St. Gallen, Switzerland
- Died: 19 April 1997 (aged 82); Appenzell, Switzerland
- Known for: Painting, drawing
- Father: Carl August Liner

Carl Walter Liner (17 August 1914 – 19 April 1997) was a Swiss painter. He trained first with his father, Carl August Liner, and later at the École des Beaux-Arts and the Académie de la Grande Chaumière in Paris. His work included landscapes, portraits and still lifes, and later developed toward abstraction and non-representational painting.

== Biography ==
Carl Walter Liner was born on 17 August 1914 in St. Gallen, and grew up in Appenzell. He was the son of the painter Carl August Liner, who gave him his early artistic training. After beginning but not completing a graphic-arts apprenticeship in Aarau in 1930, he continued his training with his father in Appenzell.

In the late 1930s, Liner spent time studying abroad, including in Egypt, Italy and France. During his stay in Paris, he attended the École des Beaux-Arts and the Académie de la Grande Chaumière, where he studied under Othon Friesz. His Paris period exposed him to French modernism. He returned to Switzerland in 1939 and performed active service until 1944. In 1944, he moved to Zürich and married Käthi Rüf.

From 1954, Liner divided his career between Appenzell, Paris and southern France. He received the Prix du bimillénaire of the city of Arles in 1983 and the cultural prize of the Stiftung Pro Innerrhoden in 1984. In 1996, he was made an honorary citizen of Fontvieille in Provence. Liner died in Appenzell on 19 April 1997.

== Work ==
Liner painted landscapes, portraits and still lifes. His landscape painting included late Impressionist approaches and Expressionism influenced by Fauvism. From the late 1940s, he moved away from the Impressionism associated with his father and turned toward Expressionism and abstract painting, including influences from the Zürich Concrete artists. In the early 1950s, some of his works moved gradually away from recognisable subjects, although he continued to paint landscapes.

His later work drew on postwar artistic developments of the 1950s and 1960s. Liner’s work has been associated with the development of non-representational art in Switzerland, particularly through its connection between landscape and abstraction. By the time of his death, he had produced around 2,500 oil paintings and 4,000 gouaches.

== Exhibitions ==
Liner exhibited regularly in Switzerland and abroad during his later career. From 1962 to 1967, he participated in the Salon des Réalités Nouvelles in Paris. In Switzerland, his work was shown at Galerie Iris Wazzau in Davos. In 2014, the centenary exhibition Pendler zwischen den Welten was shown at the Kunsthalle Ziegelhütte in Appenzell.

== Gallery ==
Hottingerstrasse im Winter, Zürich, 1944

Komposition Rot, Blau, Gelb, Ocker, Weiss, 1959

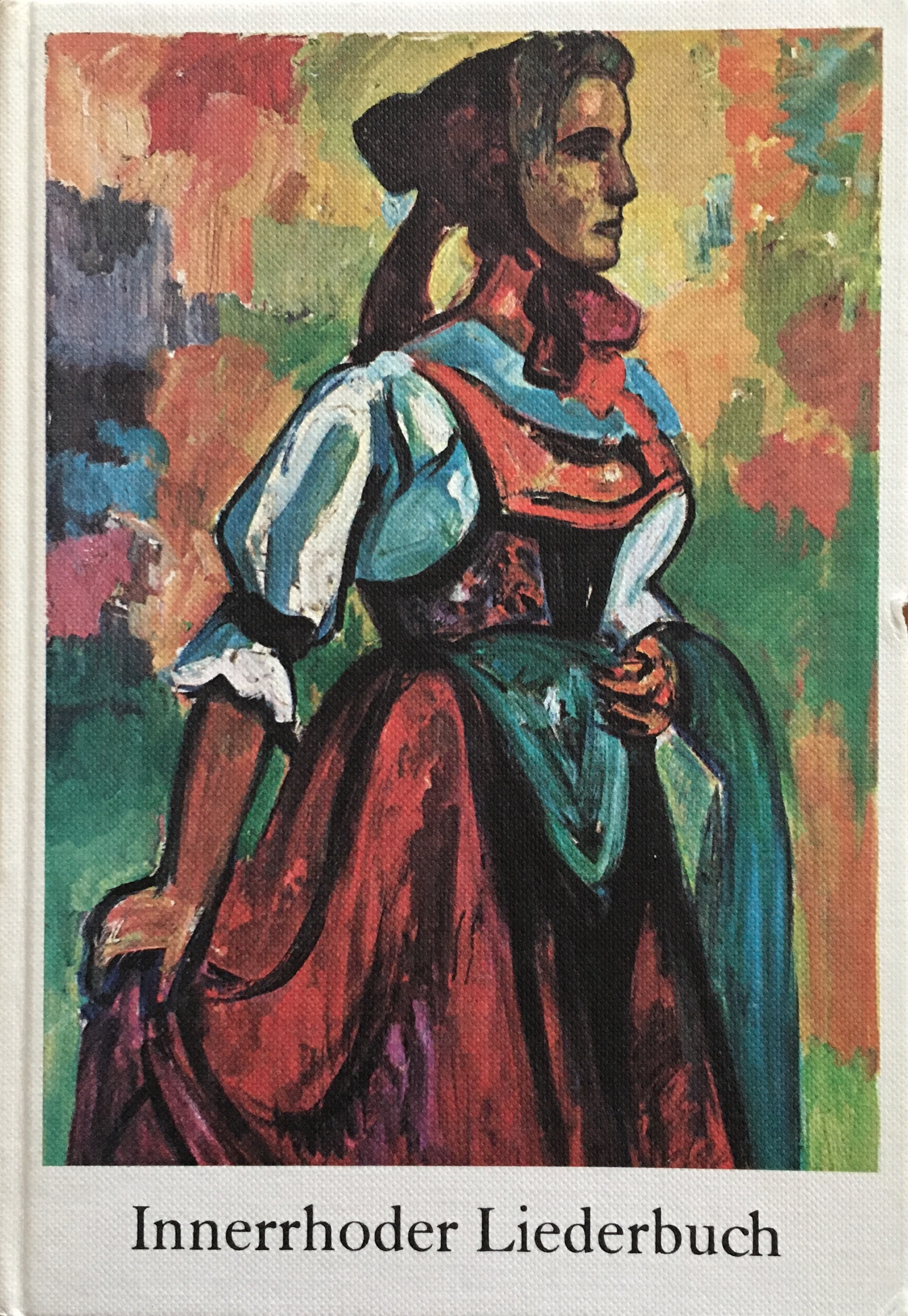
Cover image by Liner for Innerrhoder Liederbuch, 1968
