= Die Karpathen =

Die Karpathen (The Carpathians) was a German-language publication that appeared twice a month in Kronstadt, Austria-Hungary (now Braşov, Romania) between 1907 - 1914.

Subintitled Halbmonatsschrift für Kultur und Leben (Bimonthly publication for culture and life), the work was originally posted by Adolf Meschendörfer.

Die Karpathen featured articles on science and economics but Meschendörfer affirmed that he supported the "Saxons' need to escape from the traditional frame and from the vision they had about themselves".

As an example of the themes that appeared in the magazine, below is a summary of topics from a magazine from the third year of appearance, first semester, October 1909 - March 1910:

- J.Teutsch: Vorgeschichtliche Funde und Fundorte im Burzenlande (Discoveries and archeological sites in Ţara Bârsei)
- A.Höhr: Das alte Schässburg (The old Sighişoara)
- E.Buchholzer: Die soziale Stellung unserer Mittelschulprofessoren nach ihrer materiellen Seite (The social status of middle school teachers from a material point of view)
- Ed.Steinacker: Eine Selbstbiographie (An autobiography)
- H.Ungar: Ein sächsischer Dorfpfarrer im 18. und 19.Jahrhundert ("The saxon priest in the 18th and 19th centuries")
- J.Plattner: Bulea
- E.Kühlbrandt: Das Marienbild in der Kronstädter Stadtpfarrkirche (The face of the Virgin Mary in the churches of Braşov)
- H.Wildenburg: Allgemeines über den Wintersport (Everything about winter sports)
- W.Dik: Vom Winter in den Burzenländer Bergen (About winter in the hills of Ţăra Bârsei)
- K.Ungar: Das Badewesen von Hermannstadt in alter und neuer Zeit (Bathing in Sibiu past and present)
- J.Gabriel: Die Schwaben des Banates (The Banat Saxons)
- H.Krummel: Wild und Jagd im Burzenlande (Hunting in Ţara Bârsei).

The magazine stopped publishing because of the First World War.
