= Ciceu-Mihăiești =

- Commune
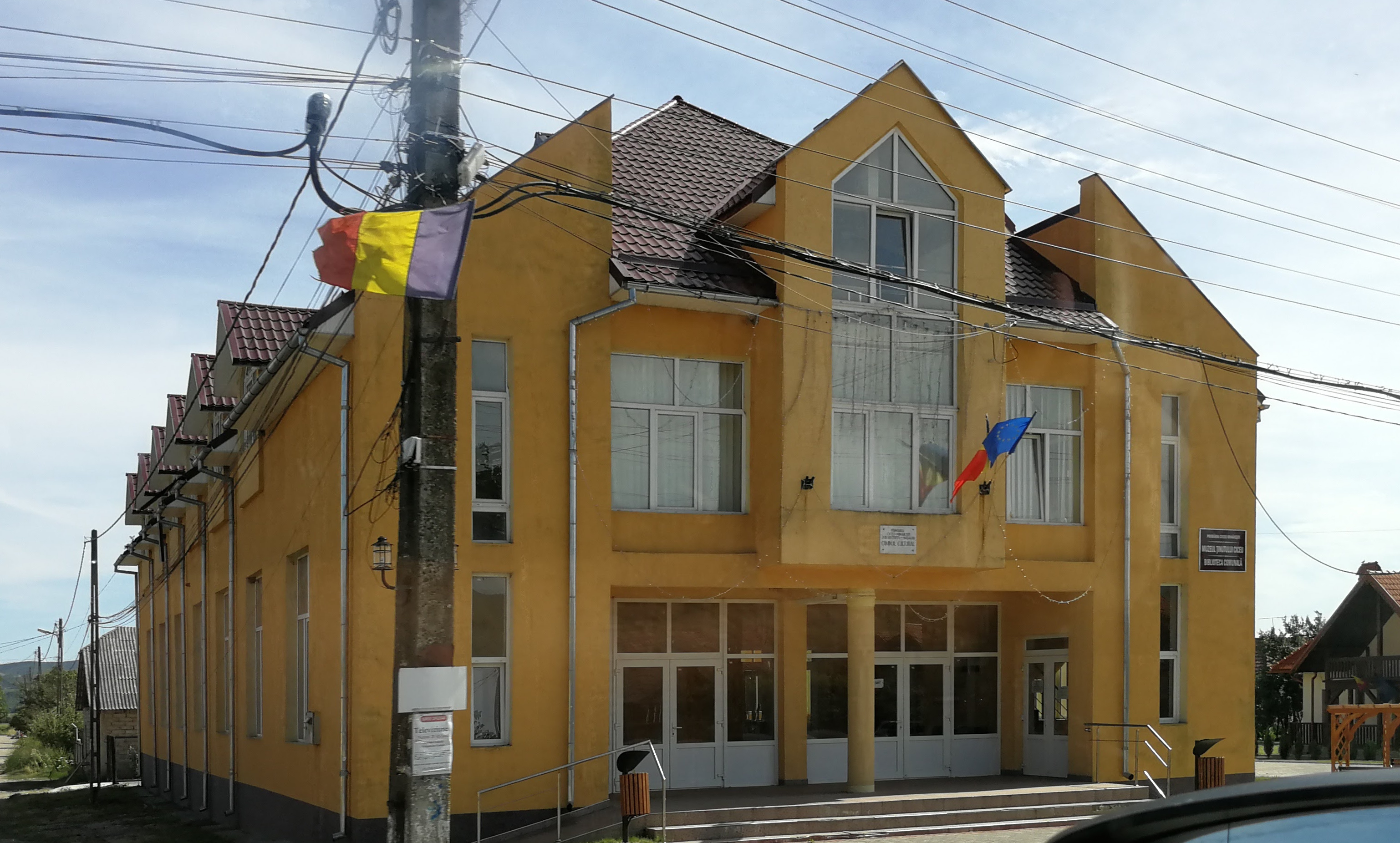
- Museum in Ciceu-Mihăiești

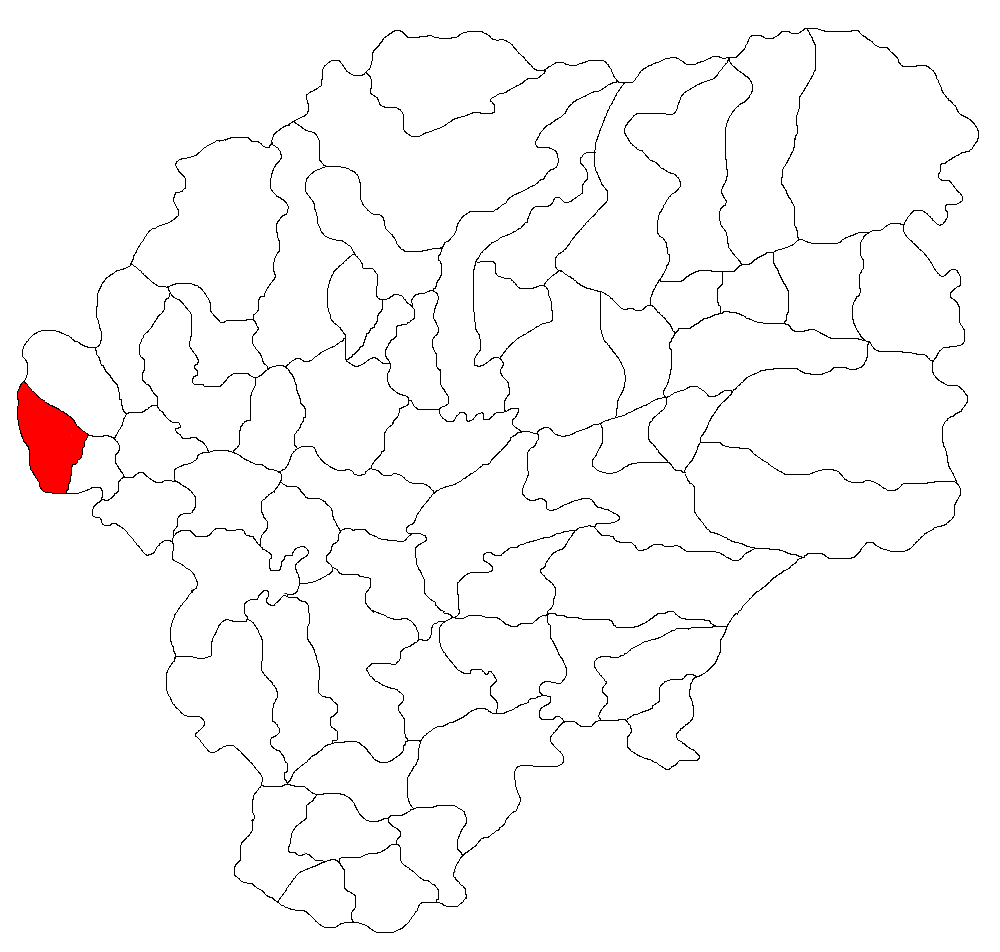
- Location in Bistrița-Năsăud County

- Location in Romania
- Coordinates: 47°12′N 23°58′E
- Country: Romania
- County: Bistrița-Năsăud

Government
  - Mayor (2020–2024): Valentin Mureșan (PSD)
- Area: 34.98 km^{2} (13.51 sq mi)
- Elevation: 252 m (827 ft)
- Population (2021-12-01): 1,175
  - Density: 33.59/km^{2} (87.00/sq mi)
- Time zone: UTC+02:00 (EET)
  - Summer (DST): UTC+03:00 (EEST)
- Postal code: 427218
- Area code: +(40) 263
- Vehicle reg.: BN
- Website: www.primariacm.ro

Ciceu-Mihăiești (German: Michelsdorf; Hungarian: Csicsómihályfalva) is a commune in Bistrița-Năsăud County, Transylvania, Romania. It is composed of three villages: Ciceu-Corabia (Neudorf, Csicsóújfalu), Ciceu-Mihăiești, and Lelești (Albendorf, Lábfalva). These were part of Petru Rareș Commune until 2005, when they were split off.

The commune is situated on the Transylvanian Plateau, at an altitude of 252 m (827 ft). It is located in the western part of Bistrița-Năsăud County, 17 km (11 mi) from the town of Beclean, on the border with Cluj County. National road DN17 (part of European route E58) connects Ciceu-Mihăiești to the county seat, Bistrița, 48 km (30 mi) to the east, and to Dej, Cluj County, 10 km (6.2 mi) to the southwest. The Ciceu-Mihăiești train station serves the CFR Main Line 400, which connects Brașov with the northwestern cities of Baia Mare and Satu Mare.
