= Friedrich Dittes =

German-Austrian educator (1829–1896)

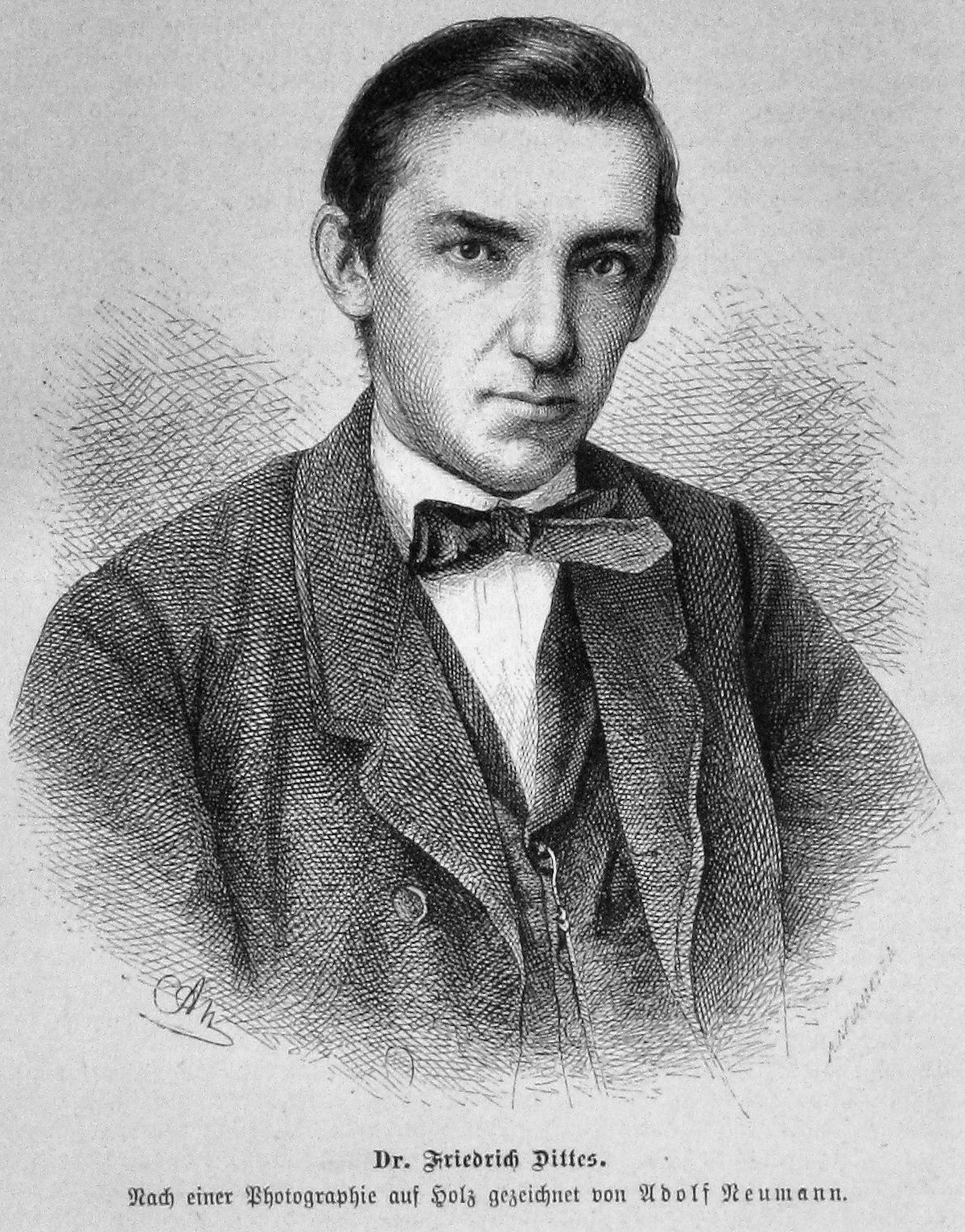
Friedrich Dittes (from page 797 of the journal Die Gartenlaube, 1883).

Friedrich Dittes (23 September 1829 in Irfersgrün – 15 May 1896 in Pressbaum) was a German-Austrian educator, known for his reform efforts within the Austrian school system.

He studied various subjects at the University of Leipzig, and in 1860 became sub-rector at a secondary school in Chemnitz. In 1865 he was named director of the teacher's college in Gotha, then three years later relocated to Vienna as director of the Pedagogium (a training facility for teachers).

He was a disciple of philosopher Friedrich Eduard Beneke, especially in regards to the latter's empirical approach to psychology and ethics. He was also influenced by the past work of educationist Johann Heinrich Pestalozzi and the contemporary teachings of Adolph Diesterweg. As an educator, Dittes believed that a school system needed to be essentially free from external pressures that included the clergy.

From 1868 to 1896 he was editor of the journal "Paedagogium: Monatsschrift für Erziehung und Unterricht". The thoroughfare "Dittesgasse" in Währing (18th district of Vienna) is named in his honor.

== Selected works ==
- Das menschliche Bewusstsein, wie es psychologisch zu erklären und pädagogisch Auszubilden (1853).
- Das Aesthetische nach seinem eigenthümlichen Grundwesen und seiner pädagogischen Bedeutung dargestellt (1854) – The aesthetic represented by its unique fundamental essence and its educational significance.
- Über die sittliche Freiheit, mit besonderer Berücksichtigung der Systeme von Spinoza, Leibnitz, Kant. Nebst einer Abhandlung über den Eudämonismus (1860) – On moral freedom, with particular attention to the systems of Spinoza, Leibniz, Kant.
- Lehrbuch der Psychologie (1873) – Textbook of psychology.
- Praktische Logik. Besonders für Lehrer (3rd edition, 1873) – Practical logic; especially for teachers.
- Lehrbuch der praktischen Logik (6th edition, 1876) – Textbook of practical logic.
- Geschichte der Erziehung und des Unterrichtes (9th edition, 1890) – History of education and teaching.
- Schule der Pädagogik. Gesammtausgabe der Psychologie und Logik, Erziehungs- und Unterrichtslehre, Methodik der Volksschule, Geschichte der Erziehung und des Unterrichtes (4th edition, 1891) – School of pedagogy. Complete edition of psychology and logic, educational and teaching doctrines, methodology of the elementary school, history of education and teaching.
