= Carl August Liner =

Swiss painter, graphic artist, designer and inventor

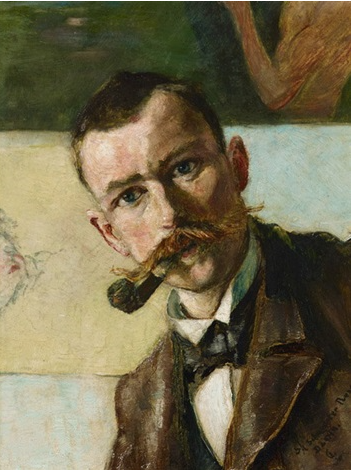
Self-portrait (1894)

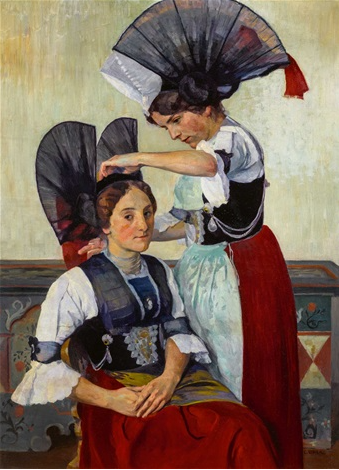
Women from Innerrhoden in Traditional Costume

Carl August Liner (8 June 1871, St. Gallen - 20 March 1946, Appenzell) was a Swiss painter, graphic artist, designer and inventor. He is sometimes referred to as Senior to distinguish him from his son, Carl Walter Liner, who was also a well known painter.

== Biography ==
He came from a large family of craftsmen. From 1890 to 1893, he studied basic painting with Johann Caspar Herterich and "en plein aire" techniques with Paul Hoecker at the Academy of Fine Arts, Munich.

In 1894, he worked as an art teacher and illustrator in St. Gallen. From 1897 to 1899, he made a study trip to Paris, Rome, and the village of Terracina. He was offered a professorship at the Kunstakademie Düsseldorf in 1901, but declined.

He married Cécile Bernet, the daughter of a textile merchant, in 1902. They had five children, including the painter, Carl Walter Liner (sometimes called "Junior"). In 1906 he acquired a farm not far from Appenzell and operated it until 1930, when he purchased an estate. In 1913, at the suggestion of Ferdinand Hodler, he founded the St.Gallen branch of the GSMBA (Gesellschaft Schweizerischer Maler und Bildhauer). He was elected President of the GSMBA Executive Board in 1928, but quit in 1931 over issues related to politics.

In addition to his paintings, he designed postage stamps and posters and did illustrations. It was this work that provided most of his income. He was also an amateur inventor and holds the patent for an early version of the single-axis mower (forerunner of the present rotary mowers). It wasn't until the 1930s that his paintings began to earn money. In 1934, he made a trip to Egypt to do portraits, commissioned by the firm of Reinhart & Schmidheiny.

For many years, he had suffered from bone tuberculosis and, by 1940, his health had deteriorated to the point that work was nearly impossible. In 1942, he became paralyzed from the waist down and was permanently hospitalized.

Major retrospectives were held in 1983 (Pfäffikon) and 1996 (Appenzell). To honor him and his son, who died in 1997, the "Museum Liner Appenzell" was opened in 1998. It has since been renamed the Kunstmuseum Appenzell.

== Sources ==
- Victor Lorent, Hans Jakob Alder: Carl Liner, Amriswil: Bodensee-Verlag (1954).
- Franz Felix Lehni: Carl Liner – Leben und Werk 1871–1946. Niggli Verlag (1970).
- Arthur Niggli: Carl Liner 1871–1946 – Zeichnungen. Niggli Verlag (1971).
- Film by Phil Dänzer and Ursina Bartsch: Carl Liner – Vater und Sohn. Phil Dänzer-AudioVision, Zürich (2001).
