= Margarete Depner =

Romanian sculptor and painter

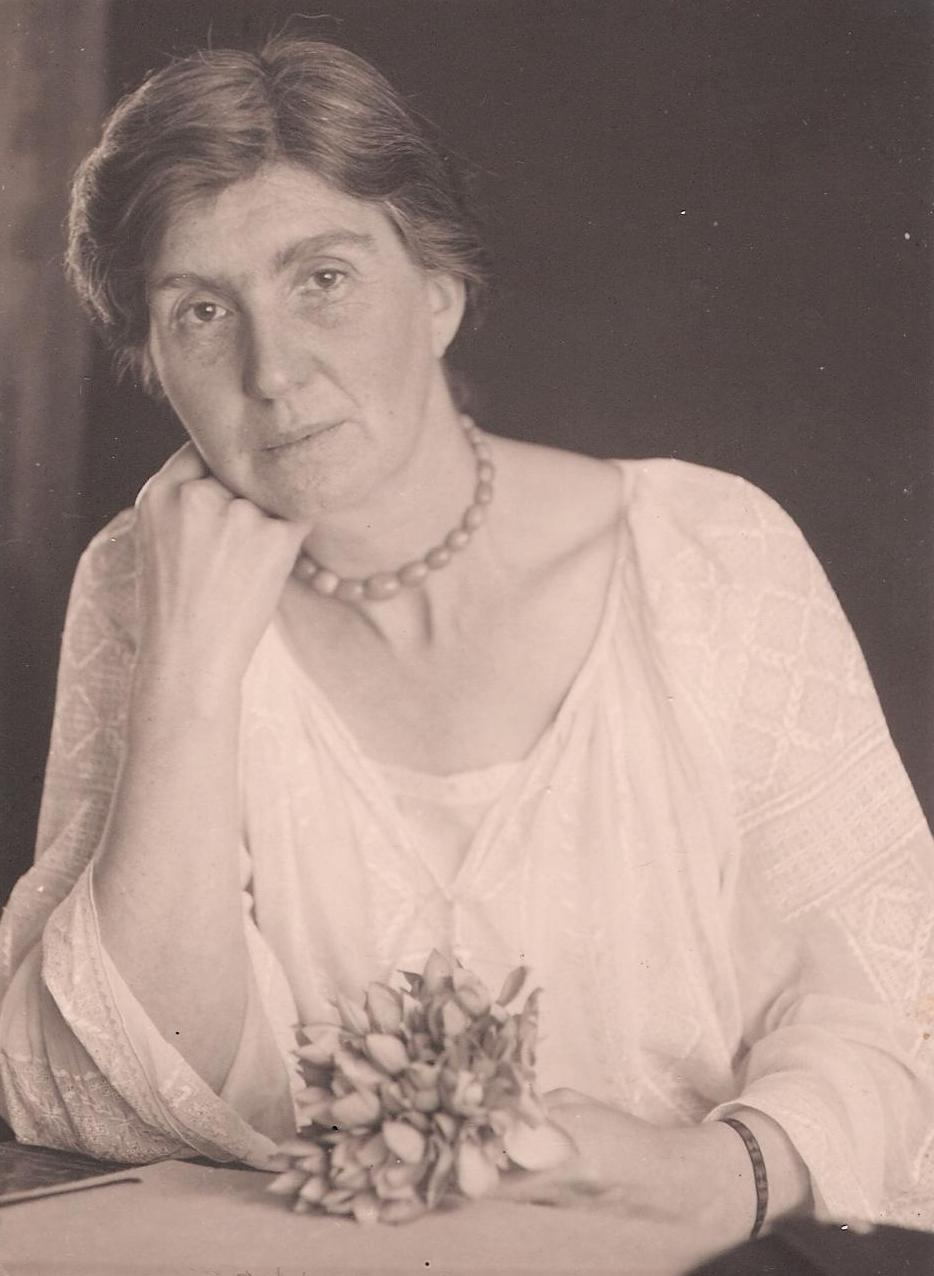
Margarete Depner

Margarete Depner (née, Margarete Scherg; 22 March 1885 - 2 September 1970) was a Romanian sculptor, painter and illustrator of Transylvanian Saxon ancestry. Born in Braşov in 1885, she died in 1970 in the same city. In 1931, she studied at the Berlin studio of Josef Thorak.
