= Ordinariate for Armenian Catholics of Romania =

Armenian Catholic ecclesiastical jurisdiction in Romania

Location
- Country: Romania
- Population: (as of 2013); 666

Information
- Denomination: Catholic Church
- Sui iuris church: Armenian Catholic Church
- Rite: Armenian Rite
- Established: 5 June 1930
- Cathedral: Holy Trinity Cathedral, Gherla

Current leadership
- Pope: Leo XIV
- Patriarch: Raphaël Bedros XXI Minassian
- Bishop: Vacant
- Apostolic Administrator: Gergely Kovács

The Ordinariate for Armenian Catholics of Romania (Romanian: Ordinariatul Armeano-Catolic), based in Gherla, is an ordinariate for Eastern Catholic faithful that is part of the Armenian Catholic Church, itself under the authority of the Pope. It serves Catholic members of Romania's Armenian community living in Transylvania.

== Overview ==
At the end of the 17th century, Transylvania's Armenians converted to Catholicism, with the town of Gherla becoming the seat of their bishop. A key role in this process was played by the missionary Oxendius Vărzărescu, who was named bishop in 1690 by Pope Alexander VIII and served until his death in 1715. Subsequently, leadership of the community fell to the Latin Church Bishop of Transylvania. Like the Romanian Greek-Catholic Church, the Armenians accepted basic Catholic principles while preserving their traditional rites and officiating liturgies in the Armenian language. By the time of the Union of Transylvania with Romania in 1918, many of the region's Armenians had undergone Magyarization. According to the terms of the 1927 Concordat between Romania and the Holy See, the country's Armenian Catholics were recognised as a standalone diocese, formally set up on June 5, 1930.

After 1948, with the onset of the Communist regime, the ordinariate had an unclear status in civil law, as it was no longer recognised by the authorities; but, from the point of view of the Catholic Church, the ordinariate continued to exist and to be in the care of Father Zoltán Lengyel, apostolic administrator since 1939. Its status changed in 1964, when a papal decree entrusted the pastoral care of the members of the ordinariate to the Bishop of Alba Iulia. The successive editions of the Annuario Pontificio from 1965 to 1991 continued to list the ordinariate, but mentioned nobody as its ordinary or even as its apostolic administrator. Although the Romanian Secretariat of State for Denominations says that in 1991 the title of ordinary was given to the Archbishop of Alba Iulia, Lajos Bálint, the Holy See's Annuario Pontificio shows that the apostolic administrator appointed in that year for the ordinariate was instead György Jakubinyi, then an Auxiliary Bishop of Alba Iulia, and that he retained that position after his elevation to Archbishop of Alba Iulia in 1994. The Holy See's action in 1991, occurring after the fall of the Communist regime, was taken without requesting recognition by the Romanian Government.

At the end of 2013, the ordinariate had one parish each in Gherla, Gheorgheni, Dumbrăveni and Frumoasa, with members living elsewhere in Transylvania as well, for a total of 666 members served by four priests, an average of 166 Catholics per priest.

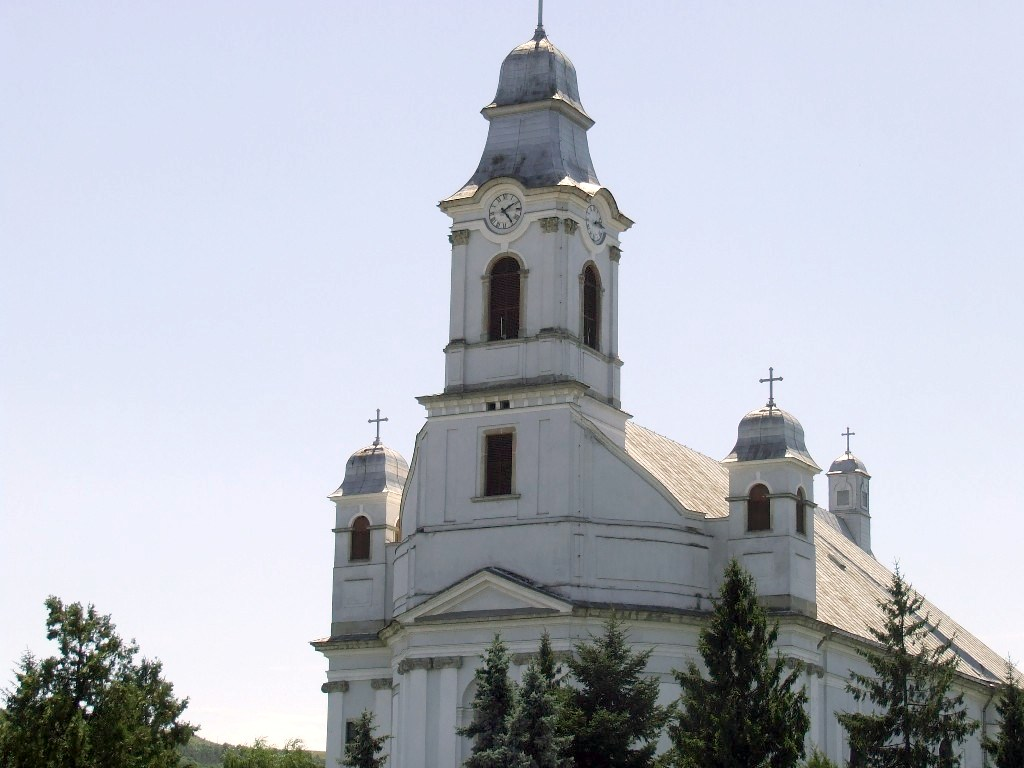
Holy Trinity Cathedral in Gherla (1748–1808)

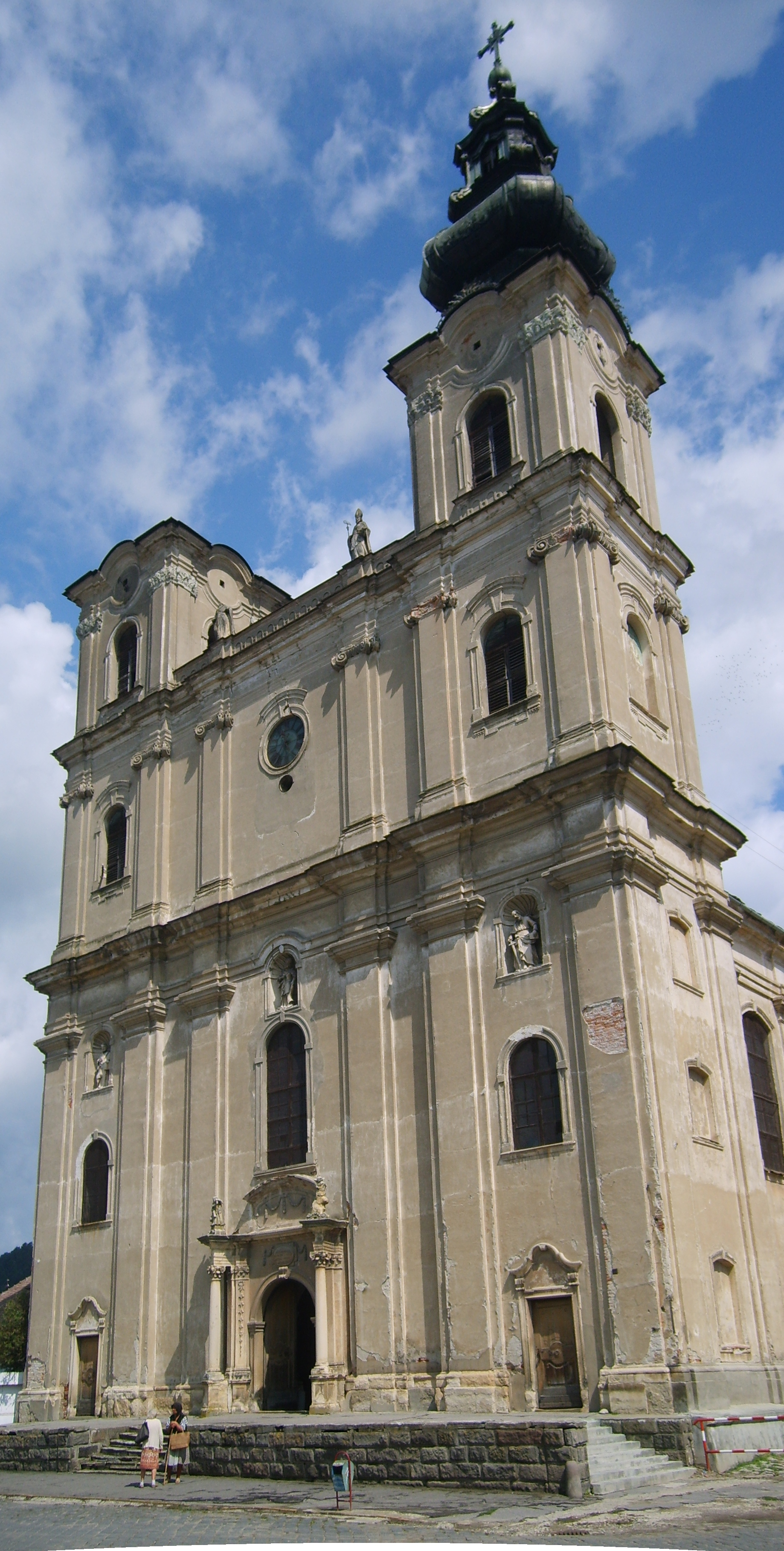
Church in Dumbrăveni (1766–1791)

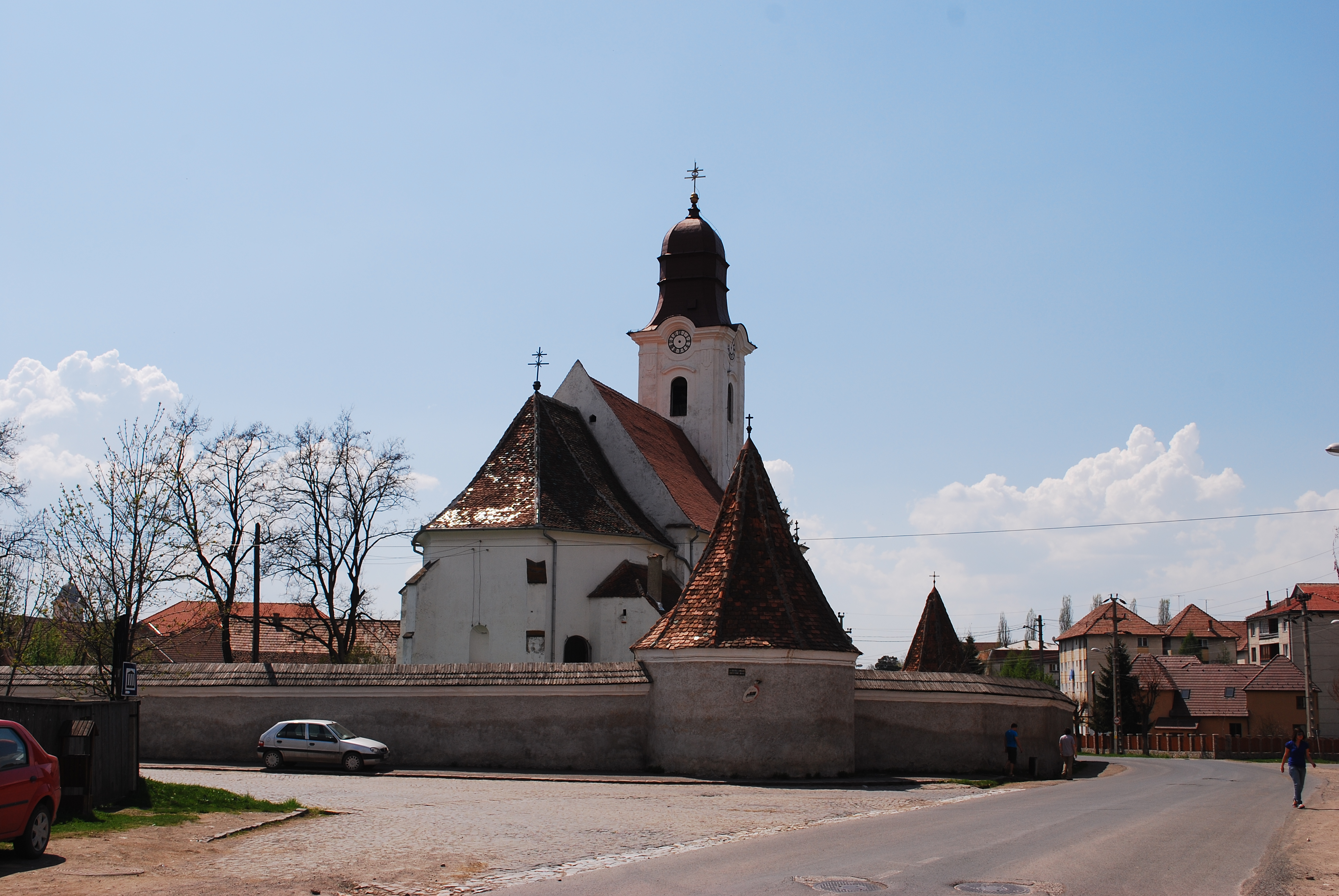
Church in Gheorgheni (1729–1733)
