= Gherla Synagogue =

Former synagogue in Gherla, Romania

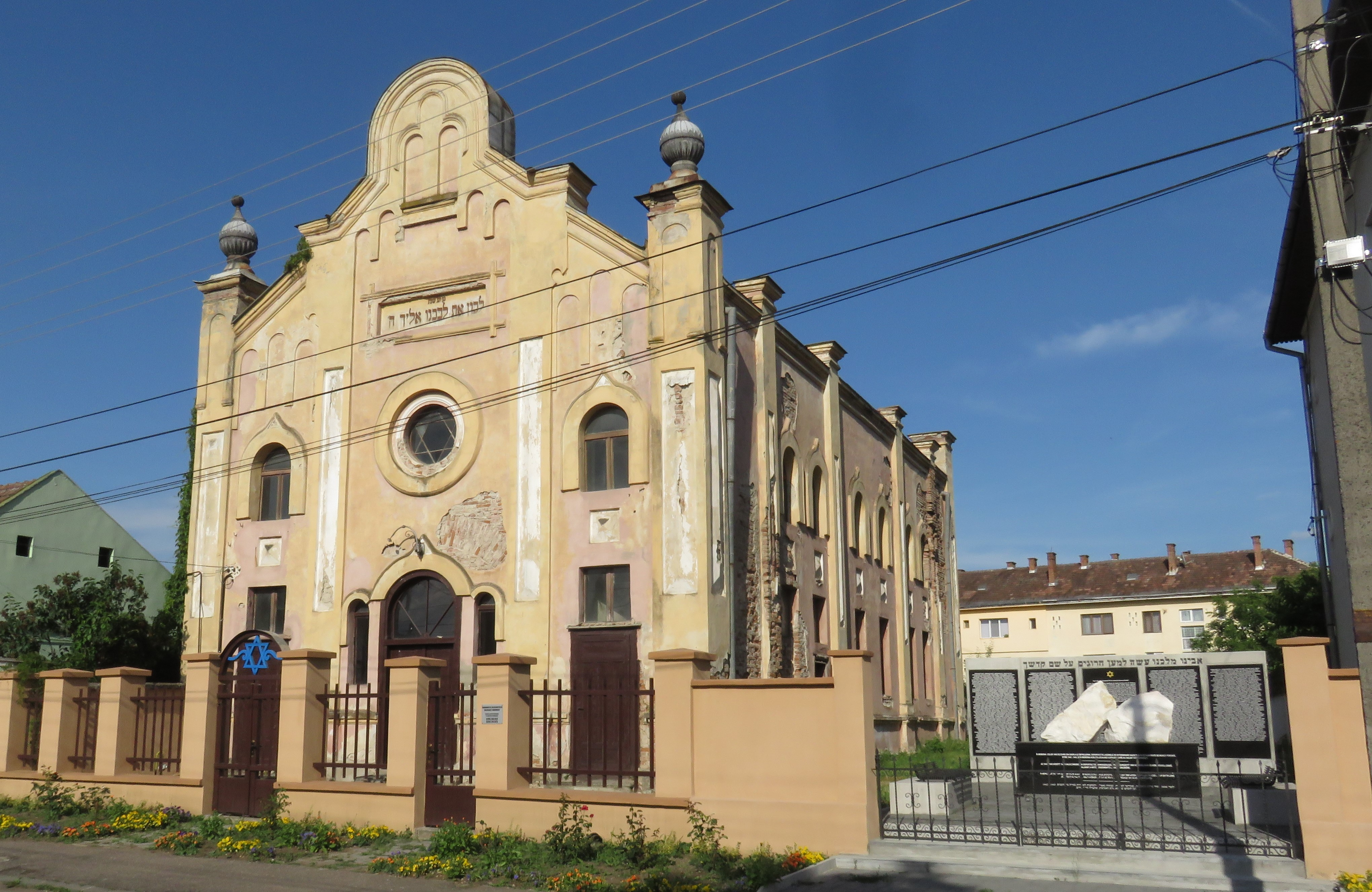
- The former synagogue and adjacent memorial to the Holocaust, in 2017

- Location of the synagogue in Cluj County

Religion
- Affiliation: Judaism
- Rite: Nusach Ashkenaz
- Ecclesiastical or organizational status: Synagogue (1903–1970s)
- Ownership: Romanian Jewish Federation
- Status: Inactive (as a synagogue); Under redevelopment

Location
- Location: 46 Crisan Street, Gherla, Cluj County, Transylvania
- Country: Romania
- Interactive map of Gherla Synagogue
- Administration: City government of Gherla
- Coordinates: 47°01′51″N 23°54′46″E

Architecture
- Type: Synagogue architecture
- Style: Moorish Revival; Romanesque Revival
- Established: c. 1850s (as a congregation)
- Completed: 1903
- Materials: Brick

The Gherla Synagogue is a synagogue, located at 46 Crisan Street, in Gherla (Hungarian: Szamosújvár) in the Cluj County of northern Romania. Designed in Moorish Revival and Romanesque Revival styles, the synagogue was completed in 1903 and operated as a synagogue until c. 1970s. The building was in danger of collapse in 2012 when fundraising was commenced to complete structural repairs and the building has since been handed to municipal authorities for restoration and renovation as a cultural center.

== History ==
=== History of the Jews in Gherla ===
The modern city of Gherla was founded by the Armenian community in the 1700s with the approval bought from Vienna, with the consent of Emperor Leopold I. In the beginning the Jews were only permitted to live in the small villages surrounding the actual city. One of the villages, Iclod, even as early as 1772 had a large Jewish population, with a house of prayer and a cemetery. Many of the Jews who lived in Iclod went to work every day in Gherla. Jews were allowed to live in a neighbourhood of Gherla, Kandia, prior to 1811; in 1811, the town council decreed the Jews were to be expulsed from Gherla within 8 days on grounds that they were raising prices and using improper measures when selling alcohol.

The Jews of Gherla worked in various branches of industry and trade; several factories were owned by Jews. The largest of these was the distillery founded by Jakov Dov Feldmann, who employed many Jewish workers. At the turn of the twentieth century, Feldmann was the congregation's president.

In the 1920s, Jews of Gherla were elected onto the city council; the Zionist Adolph Goldstein served as council secretary for many years.

=== Religious life ===
The congregation was established in the 1850s by which time the restrictions on settlement of Jews in town has been rescinded. The community grew at a gradual pace. By 1860s the congregation already had a kosher butcher, a synagogue, and a mikvah. The cemetery was opened in the 1870, until then, the burials took place in the Jewish cemetery of Iclod. Rabbi Yitzhak Yosef ha-Kohen became the first official chief rabbi of Gherla's Jewish community in 1880, acting as the spiritual leader, religious instructor, and even shochet of the community, and under his guidance many religious institutions were set up.

By 1903 there were multiple small synagogues operating in the city. That year, a large and elaborate synagogue, now known as the Gherla Synagogue, was built to accommodate the increasing Jewish population. The synagogue's seating was for several hundred people; a census taken in 1920 put the Jewish population at 1,041 or 16% of the total population. Religious life flourished, especially thanks to the construction of the new synagogue, the improving Jewish educational system, and the formation of a society which met at the synagogue to study the Talmud.

Around this time a number of rabbis moved to the city, notable among them the Hasidic rabbi Baruch Rubin, and small religious schools popped up in individual homes, leading to the establishment of a larger "Talmud Torah" school in 1922, which housed an elementary school. Other institutions formed as well, such as the chevra kadisha (burial society), several organizations which helped take care of the needy members of the community, and even a guest house for the poorer visitors to the city. A modern mikvah facility was constructed on the banks of the Somes canal and inaugurated in 1925. By 1930, census figures show that there were 1037 Jews in Gherla. The presidents of the congregation between the two World Wars were Samuel Teleki, a landowner and distiller; Simcha Klein, a landowner; and Albert Fischer, a furniture factory owner. Following the death of Rabbi ha-Kohen in 1920, his son-in-law, Rabbi Avraham Shlomo Elias became the rabbi of Gherla. After his death in 1930, his son Jakov Samuel Elias took over the spiritual leadership of the congregation. In 1944, he was deported with the rest of the Jewish population and murdered in a camp near Auschwitz in 1945.

=== Spread of Zionism ===
During this period of thriving Jewish life, the Zionist movement which was sweeping through Transylvania attracted some followers in Gherla, and precipitated some meetings and events. The first Zionist organization in Gherla, a branch of the National Association of Translyvanian Zionists, was established in 1919. The various Zionist youth groups, such as the Aviva and Barissia, as well as Betar, were launched during the 1920s. The Zionist women were gathered in the Women's International Zionist Organization (WIZO). The non-Zionist Agudath Israel also had a local chapter. However, because the Jews of Gherla were predominantly Orthodox and at the time Zionism was shunned by the majority of traditional Jews, most of the community was less receptive or even openly hostile to Zionist ideology, and the movement did not gain as wide a following or as vibrant a cultural life as it did in some other Transylvanian cities. Nevertheless, some Zionists managed to reach leadership positions in the congregation. The highest point was reached by Albert Fischer, who was also the congregation's president.

=== World War II ===
With the coming of World War II, and specifically the Second Vienna Award on August 30, 1940, everything changed. Gherla, along with the rest of Northern Transylvania, became part of Hungary. The Hungarian government began to make life difficult for the Jews with antisemitic laws such as those that prohibited Jews from attending university or having government jobs.

In 1942, Gherla became the headquarters of a labor service drafting board. In June 1942, the board conscripted 424 Jews between the ages of 21 and 42 for labor service from Cluj, Gherla, and the surrounding areas. The draftees were assigned to labor service battalions and sent to the Eastern Front in Ukraine, where most of them perished. Those that survived and returned were subsequently sent to Dachau where a large majority were murdered.

In 1943 and 1944 more Jews from Gherla were conscripted to labor service, but the majority of them were deployed within Hungary; most of these labor servicemen survived. Of note are the actions of Imre Revicky, a colonel in the Hungarian army, who tried to deal more compassionately with the Jews. Despite Revicky's job overseeing Jewish labor; he punished his subordinates for beating the workers, risking his own life repeatedly and saving the lives of hundreds of Jews in this way. He is a Righteous Among the Nations at Yad Vashem. Following the beginning of Germany's occupation of Hungary, on March 19, 1944, the Jews of Gherla were subjected to the Nazi's Final Solution. Marked with yellow stars and expropriated, the Jews were forced into the local brickyard ghetto on May 3, 1944. On the same night, the Jews who lived in villages in the Gherla and Chiochis districts were also taken to this ghetto where 1,600 Jews were crammed, 400 of whom were from neighbouring villages itself. The ghettoization was carried out under the immediate command of Mayor Lajos Tamasi, the mayor of Szamosújvár; Police Chief Erno Bereczki; and Police Chief Inspector Andor Ivanyi. On April 26, all of them had taken part in a secret conference chaired by László Endre, Hungary's State Secretary in the Ministry of the Interior.

Szamosújvár, having been selected as one of the two major ghetto sites in the county, had nearly 1,600 Jews living in its ghetto. On May 18, 1944, the population of the ghetto of Gherla was loaded onto cattle car trains and transferred to the ghetto of Cluj (Kolozsvár). They were all deported to Auschwitz-Birkenau in the transport of May 25, where the overwhelming majority was murdered in gas chambers or through the harsh conditions. A single exempted Jewish family, consisting of the First World War disabled veteran Hillel Pataki, his wife, and his unmarried son, were allowed to remain in Gherla, but they were on house arrest, could not leave the house without permission, and had to wear a white armband for identification. The family succeeded in saving most of the synagogue's Torah scrolls.

The ghetto at Kolozsvár was internally administered by a Judenrat, headed by prominent members of the Jewish community, including József Fischer, of the Neolog Jewish community, Rabbi Akiba Glasner of the Orthodox community, Ernő Marton, the former editor-in-chief of the Új Kelet, and Rabbi Mozes Weinberger. Unlike others in Northern Transylvania, the Kolozsvár Council members were fully aware of both Auschwitz and the realities of the Final Solution; almost all members of the council managed to escape deportation. Fischer, as well as his family, were among the 388 Jews who were taken from the ghetto to Budapest, and eventually to freedom, in June 1944 as part of a controversial deal by Rezső Kasztner, Fischer's son-in-law, with the SS; other council members escaped to Romania.

=== Post-war Gherla ===
When the war ended, only about 40 Jews returned home and they reestablished the community. A shelter and communal kitchen, which initially was supported by the American Jewish Joint Distribution Committee, was able to provide meals every day for desperate refugees. In 1945, the survivors renovated the synagogue, which had been used as a warehouse for confiscated Jewish owned property. The Hasidic Rabbi Rubin's son-in-law, Mozes Frischman, was among the survivors and he became the congregation's postwar rabbi. By 1947, following an influx of displaced refugees, 210 Jews lived in the city. Other survivors, such as Mihai Eisikovits, who spent 3 years in a Hungarian labour battalion, before being held prisoner in a Soviet labour camp for four years, returned in August 1948.

After the formation of the State of Israel, many Jews started to immigrate to the new Jewish homeland. By 1956, the congregation had 140 members and by 1966 the membership had declined to 21. In 1971 there were only 4 Jewish families in the city. By 2002, there was only one observant Jew, Zoltan Blum, a Holocaust survivor, who was named honorary citizen of Gherla in June 2015. Mr. Blum is still being solicited by school children and various organizations to talk about his Holocaust experience.

== Present day ==
Since 2008, many of the former Jewish residents of Gherla who now live in Israel, United States, Canada and Australia have tried to save the synagogue of Gherla which has been neglected for decades. They formed an international organization, The Jewish Community of Gherla. The president is Alexandru Sommer, a resident of Gherla of Jewish descent, whose grandmother was murdered at Auschwitz; he is actively involved in maintaining and providing access and safekeeping the Jewish cemetery and the synagogue.

Fundraising efforts began in earnest in 2012. In the spring of 2016, the organization raised enough funds to build a Holocaust Memorial Monument on the grounds of the synagogue. In addition to being a memorial to the 1600 Jews that were deported from the Gherla ghetto, and memorializing the names of the 1040 known victims, the monument is also intended to raise awareness about the fate of the synagogue and be a catalyst for fundraising efforts to repair the Gherla Synagogue.

In 2022, the city government of Gherla took over the management of the synagogue from the Romanian Jewish Federation, which owns the building. The city will administer it for 25 years.

== See also ==
- History of the Jews in Romania
- List of synagogues in Romania
- Martha Salcudean, Romanian-Canadian mechanical engineer from Gherla
