= Gherla =

- Municipality
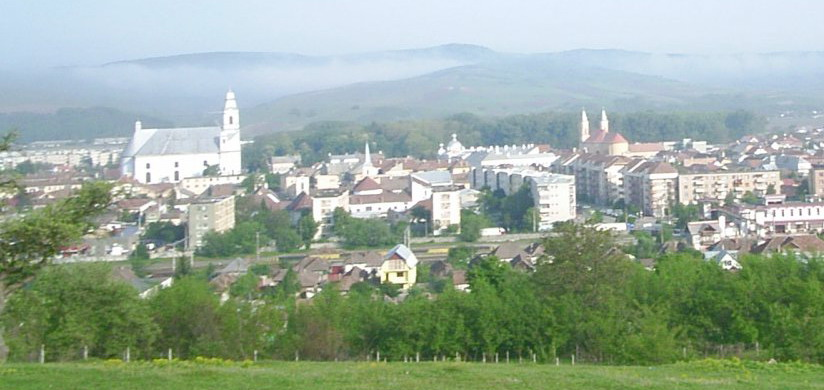
- Overview of Gherla in May 2004

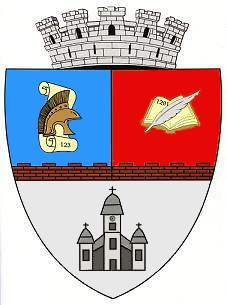
- Coat of arms

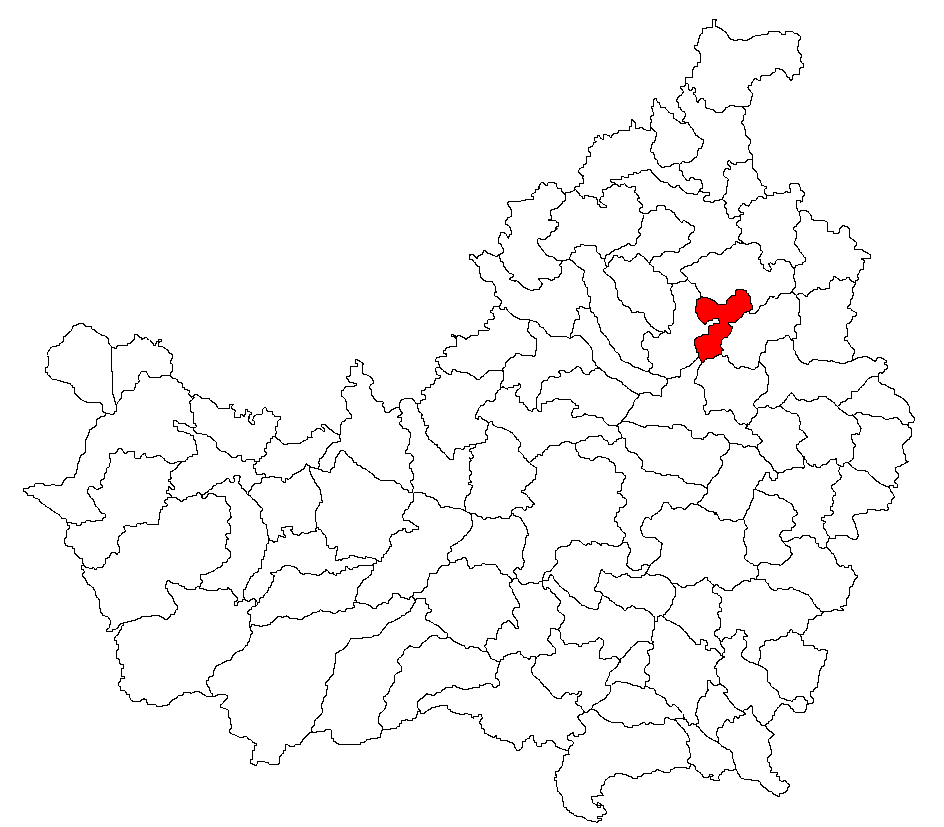
- Location in Cluj County

- Location in Romania
- Coordinates: 47°1′12″N 23°54′0″E
- Country: Romania
- County: Cluj

Government
  - Mayor (2024–2028): Ovidiu Drăgan (PNL)
- Area: 36.3 km^{2} (14.0 sq mi)
- Elevation: 250 m (820 ft)
- Population (2021-12-01): 19,873
  - Density: 547/km^{2} (1,420/sq mi)
- Time zone: UTC+02:00 (EET)
  - Summer (DST): UTC+03:00 (EEST)
- Postal code: 405300
- Area code: (+40) 02 64
- Vehicle reg.: CJ
- Website: gherla.ro

Gherla (Romanian pronunciation: [ˈɡerla]; Hungarian: Szamosújvár; German: Neuschloss) is a municipality in Cluj County, Romania (in the historical region of Transylvania). It is located 45 kilometres (28 mi) from Cluj-Napoca on the river Someșul Mic, and has a population of 19,873 as of 2021. Three villages are administered by the city: Băița (formerly Chirău, and Kérő in Hungarian), Hășdate (Szamoshesdát) and Silivaș (Vizszilvás).

The city was formerly known as Armenopolis (Armenian: Հայաքաղաք Hayakaghak; German: Armenierstadt; Hungarian: Örményváros) because it was populated by Armenians.

== History ==
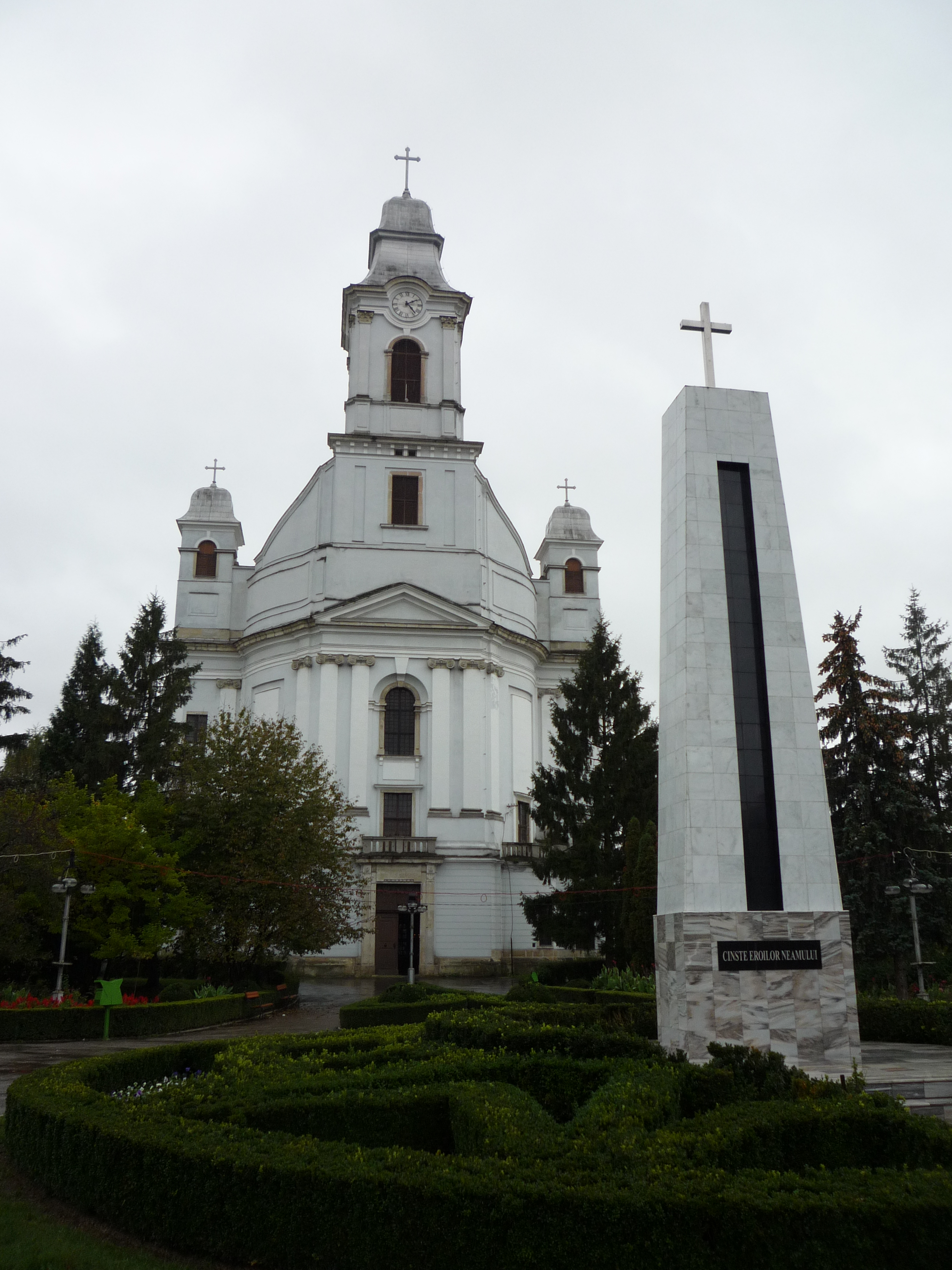
Armenian Catholic Cathedral

A clay tablet containing a fragmentary Old Persian cuneiform of the Achaemenid king Darius I was found at Gherla in 1937. It may be connected to Darius I's epigraphic activities in relation to his Scythian campaign of 513 BC as reported by Herodotus.

The locality was first recorded in 1291 as a village named Gherlahida, (probably derived from the Slavic word grle, meaning "ford"). The second name was Armenian (Հայաքաղաք, Hayakaghak) meaning "Armenian city"; it took the Medieval Latin and Greek official name Armenopolis, as well as the German alternative name Armenierstadt. Later, the name Szamosújvár was used in official Hungarian records, meaning "the new town on the Someș".

The modern city was built in the early 18th century by Armenians, successors of the Cilician Armenian diaspora, who had originally settled in Crimea and Moldavia, and moved to Transylvania sometime after 1650. After a two years' campaign by the Armenian-Catholic Bishop Oxendius Vărzărescu, they converted from the Armenian Apostolic Church to the Armenian Catholic Church; an Armenian Catholic cathedral in Gherla was consecrated in 1748.

Gherla is the seat of the Ordinariate for Catholics of Armenian Rite in Romania, as well as that of a Greek-Catholic diocese – the Cluj-Gherla Diocese (suffragan to the Greek-Catholic Archbishop of Alba Iulia and Făgăraș-Blaj, who resided in Blaj). In the center of the city lie the Saint Gregory the Illuminator and the Holy Trinity Armenian Cathedral. The main Armenian-Catholic church was built in 1792. The Greek Catholic diocese was created by the Papal Bull Ad Apostolicam Sedem of November 26, 1853, and the first bishop was Ioan Alexi.

A Habsburg fortress was built here and converted to a prison in 1785. During the Communist regime, the prison was used for political detainees. Today it is a Romanian high-security prison.

During the Years of Revolution of 1848 and 1849, Gherla was the stage for numerous battles between the warring parties, changing hands several times. The Austrian commander Karl von Urban and his Romanian Regiment liberated the city three times from Hungarian revolutionary forces, winning the Battle of Szamosújvár on 13 November 1848, a landmark of the stormy period. Starting in 1867, Gherla was no more part of the Principality of Transilvania and was annexed until 1918, to the Kingdom of Hungary comitatus of Szolnok-Doboka.

After the collapse of Austria-Hungary at the end of World War I, and the declaration of the Union of Transylvania with Romania, the Romanian Army took control of Gherla in December 1918, during the Hungarian–Romanian War. The town officially became part of the territory ceded to the Kingdom of Romania in June 1920 under the terms of the Treaty of Trianon. During the interwar period, the city was the headquarters of plasa Gherla, within Someș County, after which it became part of Ținutul Crișuri.

In the wake of the Second Vienna Award of August 30, 1940, the territory of Northern Transylvania (of which the city of Gherla was part) reverted to the Kingdom of Hungary. In early September, the Hungarian administration was installed, and proceeded to take discriminatory measures against Romanians and Jews, forcing many Romanians to take refuge in Romania. Gherla had a significant Jewish population which was decimated during the Holocaust, due to Horthyst regime and the policies of Ferenc Szálasi after September 1, 1944. Towards the end of World War II, however, the town was taken back from Hungarian and German troops by Romanian and Soviet forces in October 1944. After 1950, the city became the headquarters of Gherla raion within the Cluj Region. Following the administrative reform of 1968, Gherla became part of Cluj County.

After the war, most of the remaining Jewish population left the city. The Gherla Synagogue and the Holocaust Memorial Monument are visited by tourists from many countries. The town is also often visited by Orthodox pilgrims on their way to the nearby village of Nicula and Nicula Monastery.

== Demographics ==
Historical population
Year	Pop.	±%
1910	6,857	—
1930	6,608	−3.6%
1948	6,663	+0.8%
1956	7,617	+14.3%
1966	12,766	+67.6%
1977	17,599	+37.9%
1992	26,277	+49.3%
2002	24,232	−7.8%
2011	20,982	−13.4%
2021	19,873	−5.3%
Source: Census data

According to the 2021 Romanian census, Gherla has a population of 19,873, a decrease of 5.3% from the previous census. At the 2011 census, there were 20,982 people living within the city; of those, 15,952 (76.0%) were Romanians, 3,435 (16.4%) Hungarians, 735 (3.5%) Roma, and 61 (0.3%) others, including 16 Germans (more specifically Transylvanian Saxons).

== Natives ==
- Tamás Aján (born 1939), President of the International Weightlifting Federation and member of the International Olympic Committee
- Laur Aștilean (born 1973), footballer
- Mihai Chezan (born 1935), volleyball player
- Cristian Coroian (born 1973), footballer
- Cyrill Demian (1772–1849), inventor, organ and piano maker
- Nechita-Adrian Oros (born 1965), veterinarian and politician
- Gergely Pongrátz (1932–2005), veteran of the Hungarian Revolution of 1956
- Silviu Prigoană (1963–2024), businessman and politician

== See also ==
- Gherla Synagogue
- Gherla Prison
- Ordinariate for Armenian Catholics of Romania
