= Someș County =

Județul Someș
- County (Județ)
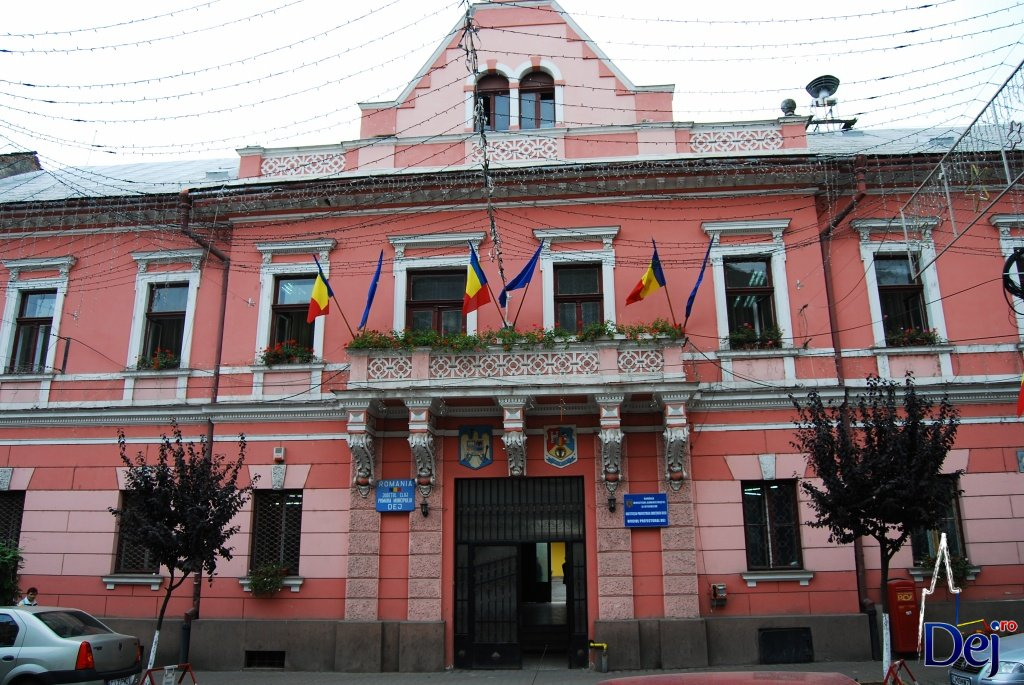
- Someș County Prefecture in Dej, currently the Dej city hall.

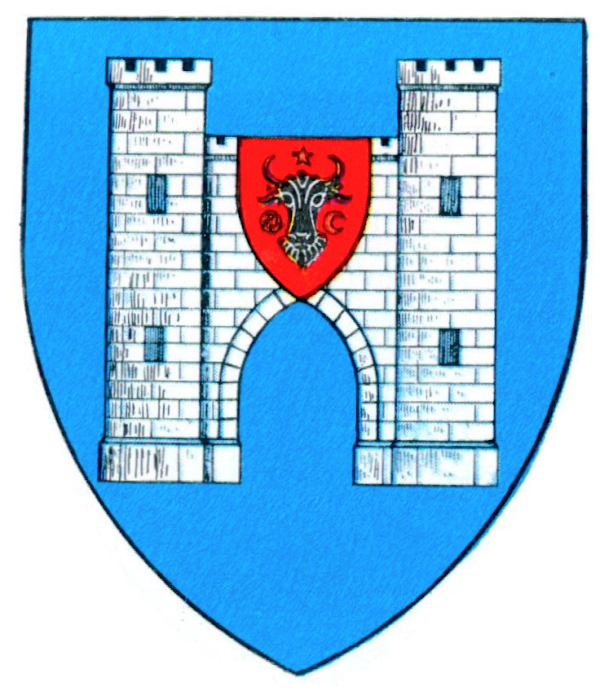
- Coat of arms

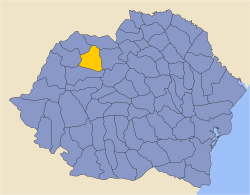
- Country: Romania
- Historic region: Transylvania
- Capital city (Reședință de județ): Dej
- Established: 1925
- Ceased to exist: Administrative reform of 1950

Area
  - Total: 3,965 km^{2} (1,531 sq mi)

Population (1930)
  - Total: 219,335
  - Density: 55.32/km^{2} (143.3/sq mi)
- Time zone: UTC+2 (EET)
  - Summer (DST): UTC+3 (EEST)

Someș County is one of the historic counties of Transylvania, Romania. The county seat was Dej.

In 1938, the county was disestablished and incorporated into the newly formed Ținutul Crișuri, but it was re-established in 1940 after the fall of King Carol II's regime, only to be abolished 10 years later by the Communist regime.

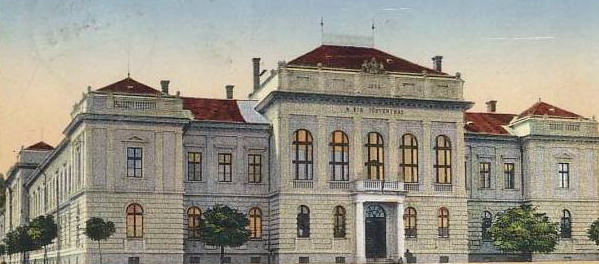
The Someș County courthouse during the interwar period, now the Dej palace of justice.

== Geography ==
Someș County covered 3,965 km^{2} (1,531 sq mi) and was located in Transylvania. The territory that comprised Someș County is now located in the Bistrița-Năsăud, Maramureș, Cluj, and Sălaj counties. It neighbored Satu Mare and Maramureș counties to the north, Năsăud County to the east, Cluj County to the south, and Sălaj County to the west.

== Historical County ==
Prior to World War I, the territory of the county belonged to Austria-Hungary, identical with the Szolnok-Doboka County of Hungary. During the Hungarian–Romanian War of 1918–1919 the area passed under Romanian administration. The territory was transferred to the Kingdom of Romania from the Kingdom of Hungary in 1920, under the Treaty of Trianon. The Romanian name of the county became Someș-Dăbâca County. After the administrative unification law in 1925, the county was renamed to Someș County, and its territory was reorganized. In 1940, it was transferred back to Hungary with the rest of Northern Transylvania under the Second Vienna Award. Beginning in 1944, Romanian forces with Soviet assistance recaptured the territory and re-established jurisdiction in 1945. The transfer of the county per the Treaty of Trianon was reaffirmed in the Paris Peace Treaties, 1947. The county was finally disestablished by the communist government of Romania in 1950.

== Administrative organization ==
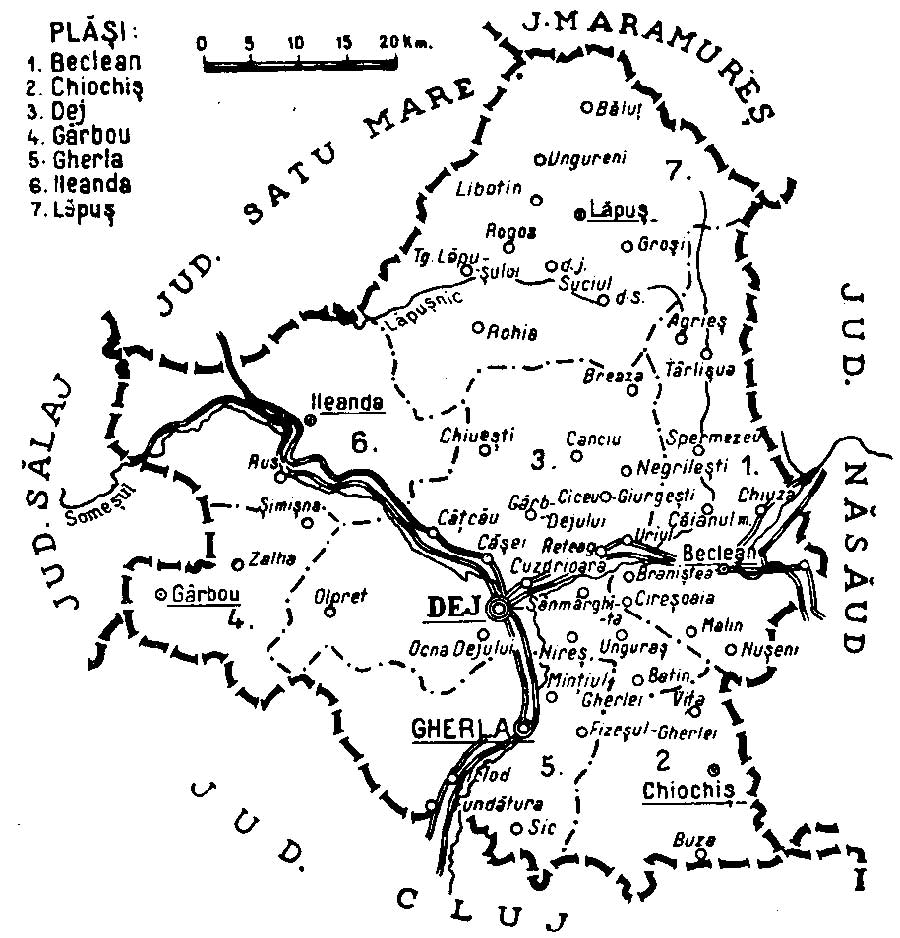
Map of Someș County as constituted in 1938.

Administratively, Someș County was divided originally into six districts (plăși):

1. Plasa Beclean (headquarters at Beclean)
2. Plasa Dej (headquarters at Dej)
3. Plasa Gârbou (headquarters at Gârbou)
4. Plasa Gherla (headquarters at Gherla)
5. Plasa Ileanda (headquarters at Ileanda)
6. Plasa Lăpuș (headquarters at Lăpuș)

Later, a seventh district was added:

7. Plasa Chiochiș (headquarters at Chiochiș)

== Population ==
According to the 1930 census, the county counted 219,335 inhabitants, of which 77.5% were Romanians, 15.4% Hungarians, and 4.8% Jews, and other smaller minorities. From a religious point of view, the population was mostly Greek Catholics (63.5%), followed by Eastern Orthodox (15.0%), Reformed (12.8%), Roman Catholics (3.2%), and other smaller minorities.

=== Urban population ===
The urban population consisted of 41.3% Romanians, 33.0% Hungarians, 20.1% Jews, 1.7% Armenians, and other smaller minorities. As a mother tongue in the urban area Romanian predominated (41.4%), followed by Hungarian (36.8%), Yiddish (18.3%), German (1.0%) and others. From the religious point of view, the population was made up of Greek Catholics (33.2%), followed by Reformed (22.6%), Jews (20.2%), Roman Catholics (11.9%), Eastern Orthodox (8.6%), Armenian-Catholic (2.3%), and other smaller denominations.
