= Mihai Chezan =

Romanian volleyball player

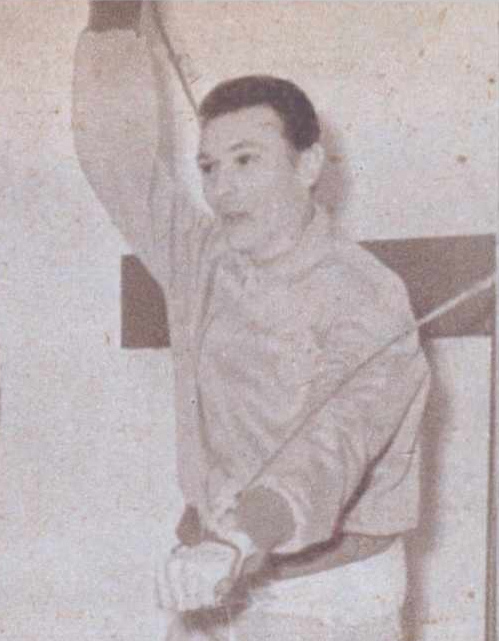

Personal information
- Nationality: Romanian
- Born: 21 October 1935 (age 89); Gherla, Romania

Sport
- Sport: Volleyball

Mihai Chezan (born 21 October 1935) is a Romanian volleyball player. He competed in the men's tournament at the 1964 Summer Olympics.
