= Ținutul Someș =

Ținutul Someș Ținutul Crișuri
- Land (Ținut)
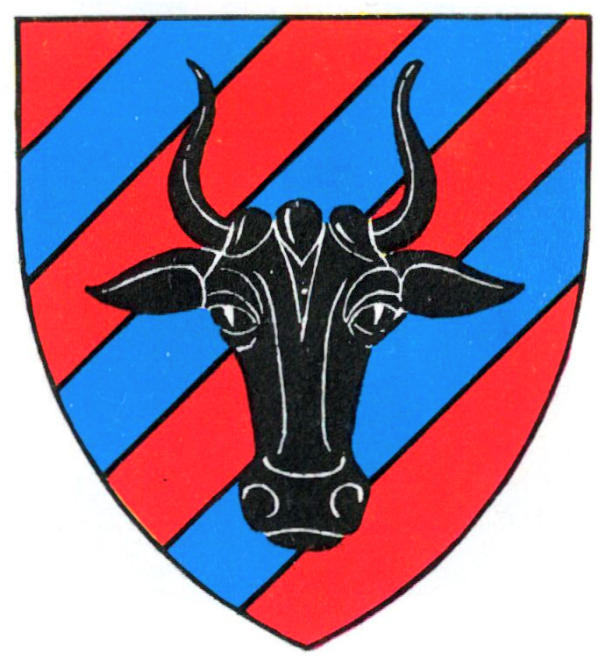
- Coat of arms

- Country: Romania
- Former counties included: Bihor County, Cluj County, Maramureș County, Sălaj County, Satu Mare County, Someș County, Năsăud County
- Historic region: Transylvania (Maramureș, Crișana)
- Capital city (Reședință de ținut): Cluj
- Established: 14 August 1938
- Ceased to exist: 22 September 1940

Government
  - Type: Rezident Regal

Area
  - Total: 33,385 km^{2} (12,890 sq mi)

Population (1938 (?))
  - Total: 2.143.453
- Time zone: UTC+2 (EET)
  - Summer (DST): UTC+3 (EEST)

Ținutul Someș was one of the ten ținuturi ("lands") of Romania, founded in 1938 after King Carol II initiated an institutional reform by modifying the 1923 Constitution and the law of territorial administration. It comprised parts of Transylvania, and included the entire regions of Crișana and Maramureș. It was named after the rivers Someș, Crișul Alb, Crișul Negru, and Crișul Repede; its capital was the city of Cluj. Ținutul Someș ceased to exist de facto following the territorial losses of Romania to Hungary in 1940, and de jure on 22 September 1940.

== Coat of arms ==
The Coat of Arms is composed of 7 sinister bends, 4 of gules and 3 of azure, representing the former seven counties (județe) of the Greater Romania (71 in total in 1938) it included. Over the mirror bends there is a sable aurochs head (in reference to Voivode Dragoș of Maramureș, and to the symbol of Moldavia - see Flag and coat of arms of Moldavia).

== Counties incorporated ==
After the 1938 Administrative and Constitutional Reform, of the older 71 counties Ținutul Someș included 7:

- Bihor County
- Cluj County
- Maramureș County
- Năsăud County
- Sălaj County
- Satu Mare County
- Someș County

== See also ==
- Historical administrative divisions of Romania
- Nord-Vest (development region)
- History of Romania
