= Holy Trinity Cathedral, Gherla =

Coordinates: 47.0200°N 23.9000°E

Holy Trinity Cathedral
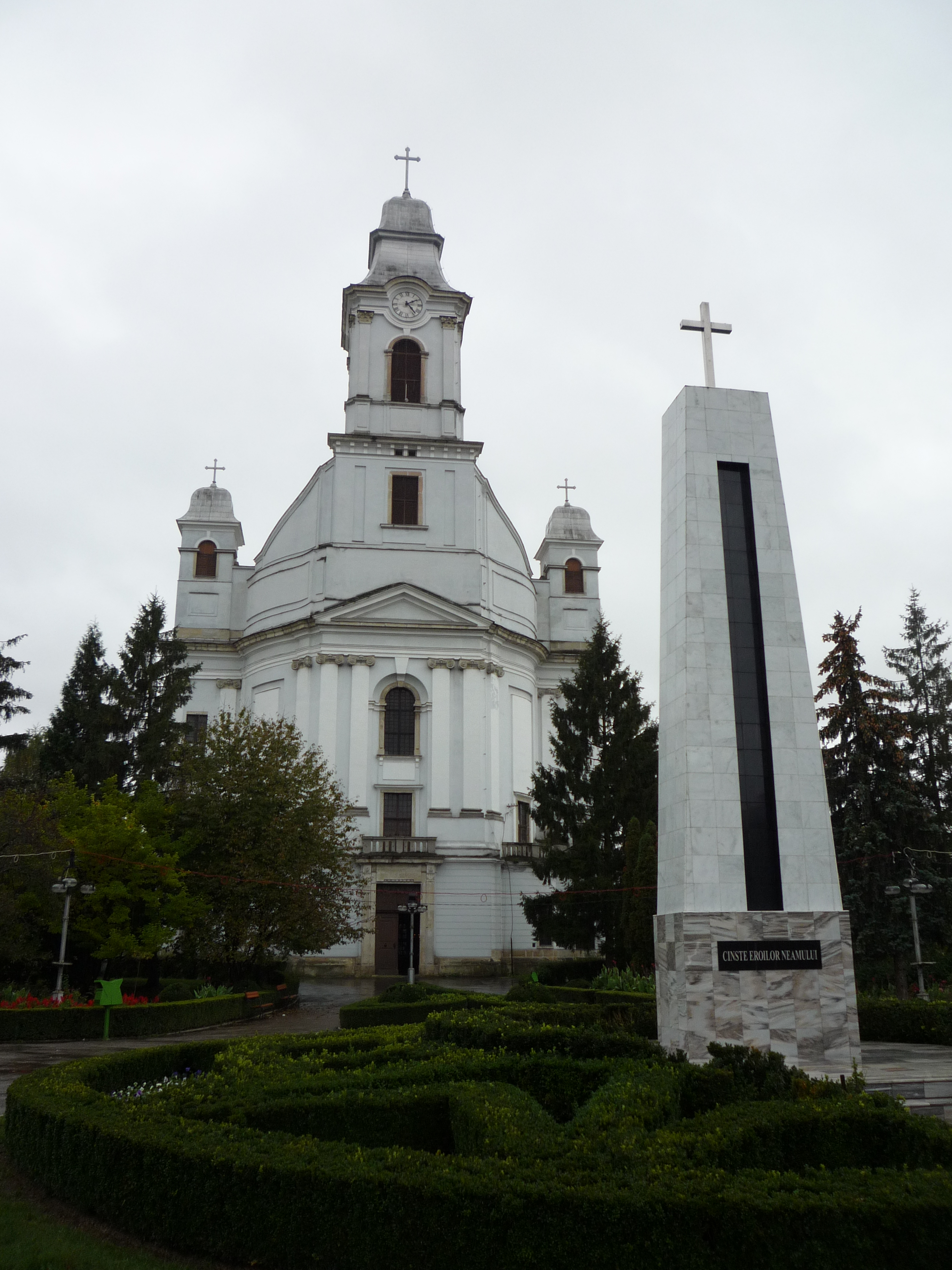
- Holy Trinity Cathedral
- Location: Gherla
- Country: Romania
- Denomination: Catholic Church (Armenian Rite)

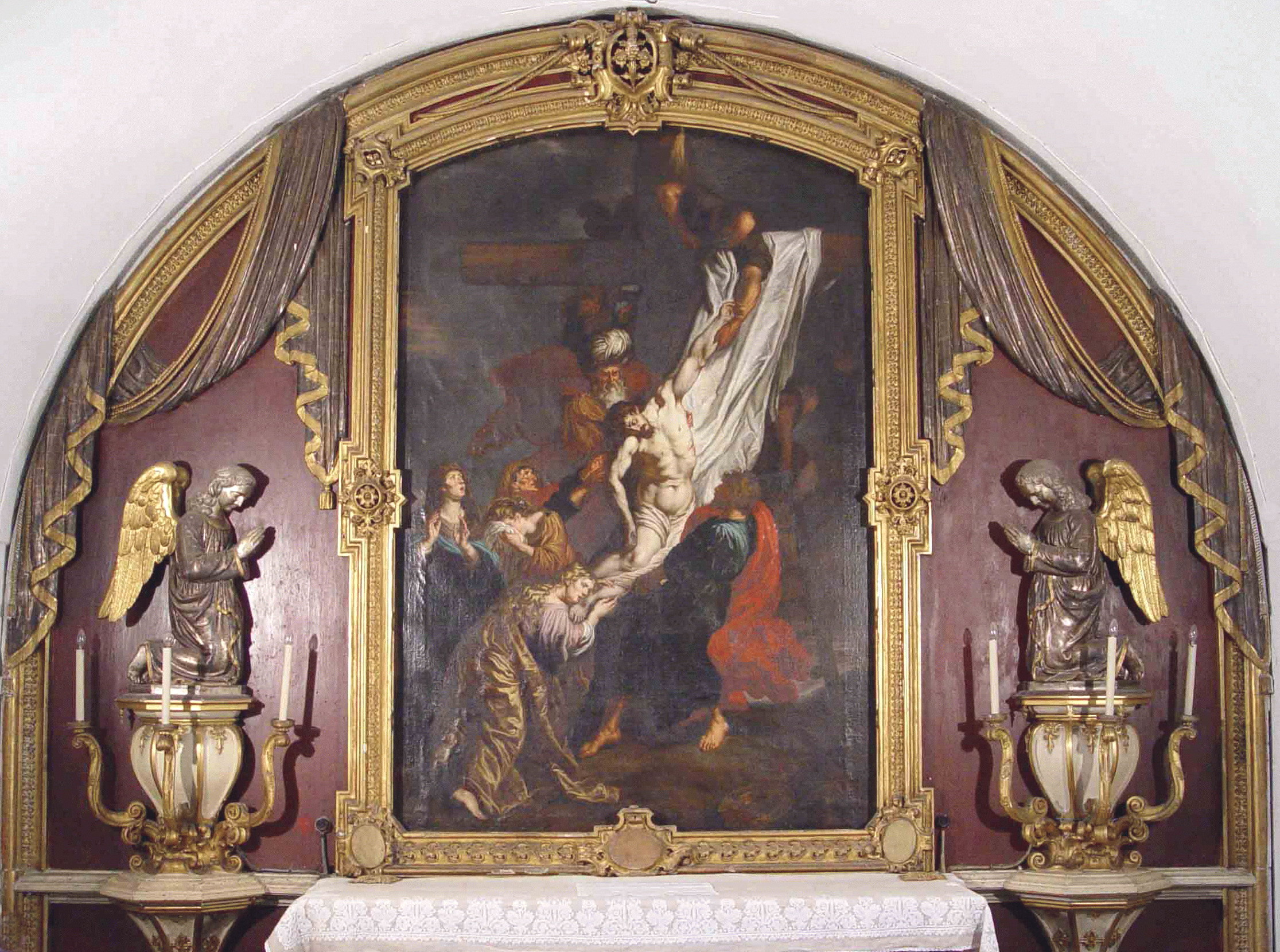
The Deposition of Christ from the Cross, by Peter Paul Rubens, displayed at the Holy Trinity Cathedral in Gherla

The Holy Trinity Cathedral (Romanian: Catedrala Armeano-Catolică Sfânta Treime), also known as Armenian Cathedral of the Holy Trinity, is the cathedral church of the Ordinariate for Catholics of Armenian Rite in Romania. It is located in Gherla, Cluj County.

During the eighteenth century, Armenian emigrants from Moldavia settled in the city through the authorization of the imperial court in Vienna to escape Protestantism and contributed greatly to the city's growth. They built the present cathedral between 1748 and 1776 in Baroque style. The Armenian community welcomed by the Austrian Empire brought a lot of wealth and Emperor Francis I, in gratitude, decided to offer them as a gift a painting from the imperial gallery in Vienna. The choice fell on Rubens' The Deposition of Christ from the Cross, which is still displayed in the cathedral.

== See also ==
- Catholicism in Romania
- Holy Trinity Cathedral (disambiguation)
