= Armenian Church, Gheorgheni =

Heritage site in Harghita County, Romania

Coordinates: 46.7247°N 25.6058°E

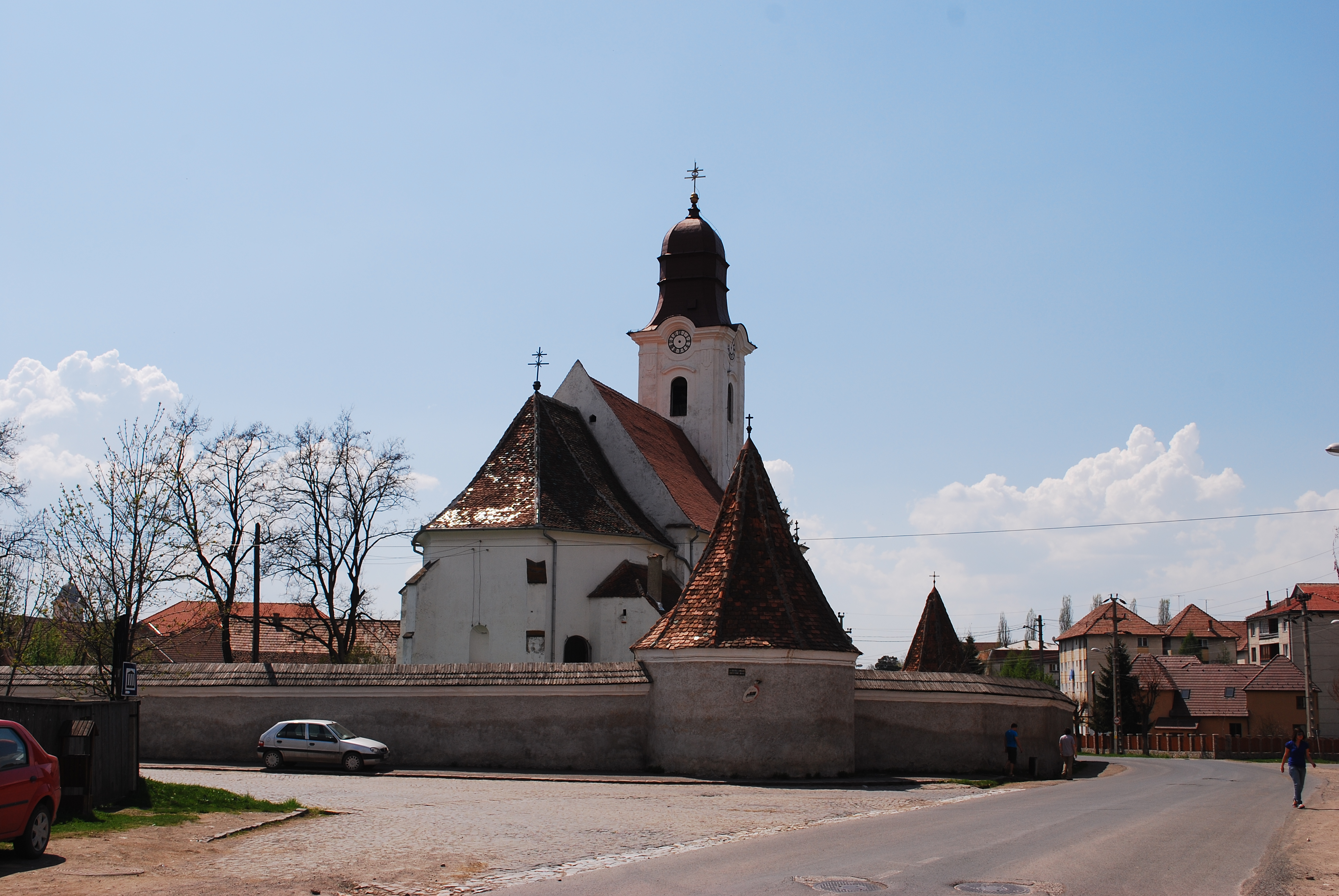
Armenian Church

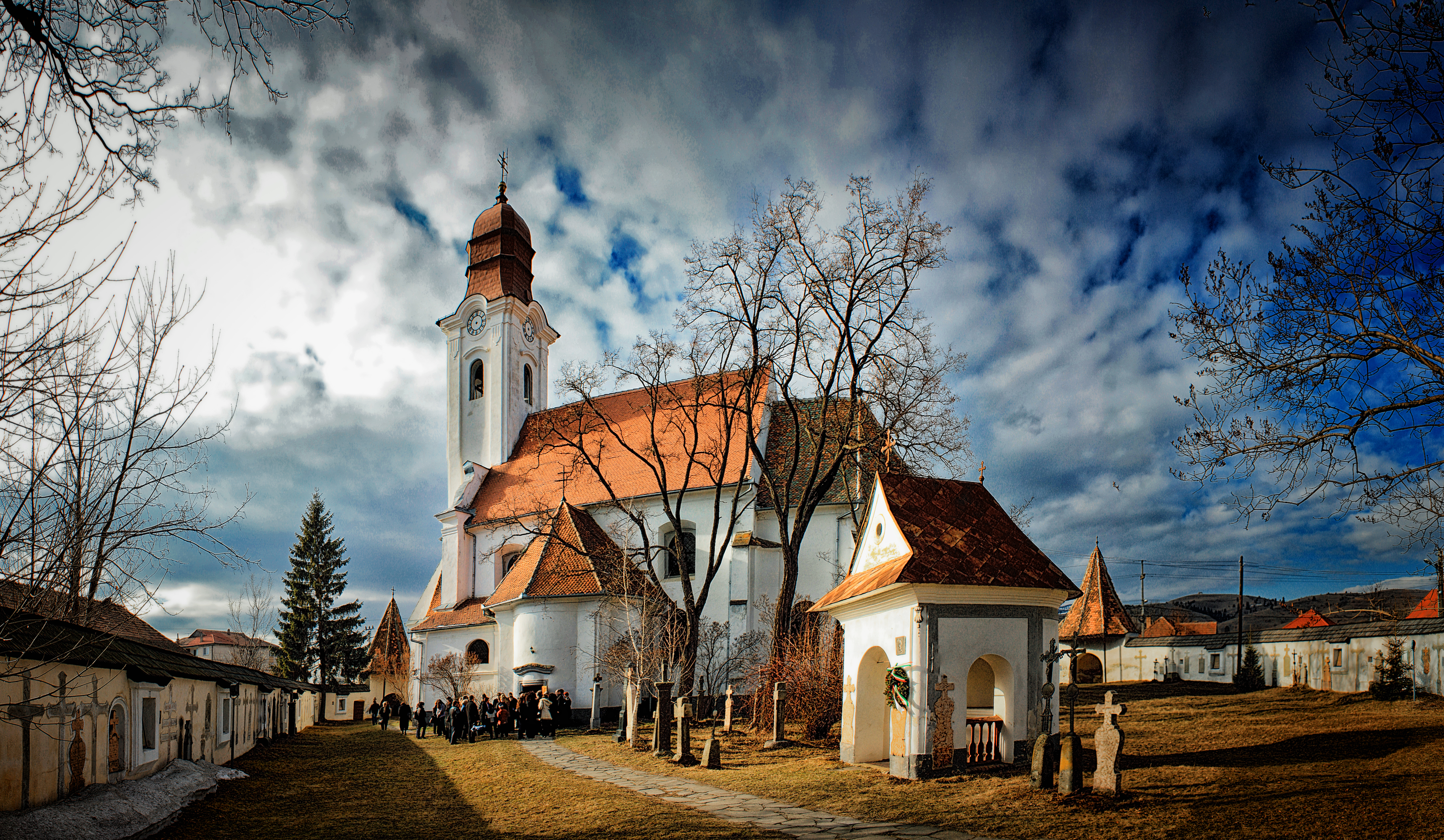
Another view

The Armenian Church (Romanian: Biserica armeano-catolică Nașterea Maicii Domnului) is an Armenian Catholic church located at 1 Biserica Armeană Street in Gheorgheni, Romania. It is dedicated to the Nativity of Mary and forms part of the Ordinariate for Catholics of Armenian Rite in Romania.

== History ==
Armenians first arrived in Gheorgheni, then part of the Principality of Transylvania, during the 17th century: possibly two brothers came in 1654, or a group in 1688. At first, their religious services took place in rented private homes. In 1613, a Roman Catholic parish priest had established a cemetery for foreigners behind the old Gothic chapel that dated to around 1450. In 1698, the bishop's vicar handed over the cemetery to the Armenians, who bought the chapel in 1712 from prelate György Mártonffy for 120 forints. In place of the chapel, they built a larger church for the growing Armenian community, but after this too proved too small, chose a new site for a church in 1729. To the right of the main entrance, there is a plaque with an inscription in Armenian that indicates the Armenians who settled in the town in 1688 built the Baroque-style church in 1733 and that it was blessed in 1772 by Antal Bajtay, Catholic bishop of Transylvania, in honor of the Nativity of Mary. Work was overseen by an Armenian-rite priest and primarily funded through contributions from religious associations. The church is surrounded by a crenellated and fortified wall that now includes the fifteen Stations of the Cross. Land for the imposing parish house was purchased in 1768. A chanter's house was built in the churchyard in 1780 and, near the edge of the land, a house for the bell-ringer. The church owns valuable books and numerous works of art.

The church was entirely renovated in 1889. In the later 19th century, it acquired stained-glass windows and a pneumatic organ, while the cemetery was revamped and the parish house restored. The local Armenians founded a school in 1794 and supported a gymnasium, but a decline in population caused the school to shut down in the early 1880s. Restoration work on the church and affiliated buildings began in 2003; the old books were inventoried and the archive catalogued.

The church is listed as a historic monument by Romania's Ministry of Culture and Religious Affairs, as are the 1650 chapel and the 1748 surrounding wall.
