= Martha Salcudean =

Romanian-born Canadian mechanical engineer (1934–2019)

Martha Sălcudean (née Abel; 1934 – 17 July 2019) was an internationally recognised expert in computational fluid dynamics. She was Canada's first female head of a university engineering department.

Salcudean was born in 1934 in Cluj, Romania, into a Jewish family. She survived the Bergen-Belsen concentration camp and decades living under totalitarian regimes before she moved to Canada in 1976. Salcudean was a recipient of several provincial and national engineering awards in Canada.

Salcudean died on 17 July 2019.

== Education ==
Before moving to Canada, Salcudean was educated in Romania where she obtained Bachelor's and post-graduate degrees in mechanical engineering; her undergraduate degree was from the Cluj Polytechnic Institute.

== Professional life ==
Salcudean was a professor at the University of Ottawa for nine years before moving to the University of British Columbia (UBC), where she served as the first female head of a Canadian university's engineering department.

Salcudean is greatly respected in the areas of computational fluid dynamics and heat transfer, and she received several awards including the Commemorative Medal for the 125th Anniversary of Canadian Confederation, the Engineering Institute of Canada's Julian C. Smith Medal for “Achievement in the Development of Canada”, APEG BC's Meritorious Achievement Award, and the National Izaak Walton Killam Memorial Prize in Engineering.

Salcudean was awarded the Order of British Columbia in 1998 and became an Officer of the Order of Canada in 2004. She also received honorary doctorates from the University of Ottawa, University of Waterloo and UBC, and was a Fellow of the Royal Society of Canada and of the Canadian Academy of Engineering.
