= Oxendius Vărzărescu =

- Church: Armenian Catholic Church
- Installed: 1687
- Term ended: 10 March 1715

Personal details
- Born: 1655 Botoşani, Western Moldavia
- Died: 10 March 1715 (aged 59–60) Vienna, Habsburg monarchy

Oxendius Vărzărescu (Latin: Oxendius Verzellescus, Armenian: Օշենտիոս Վըրզարեան or Վրզարեան, Hungarian: Verzár Oxendius) (1655 - 1715) was the first bishop of the Armenian Catholic Church of Gherla.

== Biography ==
Oxendius Vărzărescu was born in 1655 in Botoșani. He was an Armenian Apostolic priest, coming to Bistrița with Moldovan Armenians.

In 1670 Vărzărescu was in Rome, where he studied and was appointed bishop of the Armenians in Transylvania. Between 1672 and 1686 he made his church's union in Rome. In 1687 he was ordained (consecrated) to the episcopate by the Armenian Catholic Bishop of Lviv.

With the Armenian gold he went to Vienna to buy a territory on which the Armenians could settle in order to build a city. Thus the town of Gherla was born, where he exercised his pastoral work for almost twelve years.

In 1712 he went to Vienna, where he died on 10 March 1715.

== Sources ==
- Bálint Kovács - "Über Rom nach Siebenbürgen", in "Zeitschrift für Siebenbürgische Landeskunde", nr. 1/2006, pp. 44–50.
- Ernst Christoph Suttner - "The Armenians and the Episcopate of Gherla" in "Studia Universitatis Babeş-Bolyai, Theology Catholic", Year XLIX, 2004, pp. 7–28.
- Ernst Christoph Suttner - "The Armenians of Poland and Hungary in the 17th Century in Concomitant Communion with the Church of Rome and the Armenian Patriarchal Church" in "Studia Universitatis Babeş-Bolyai" Theologia Catholica, no. 3/2008, pp. 101–110.
