= Năsăud County =

Județul Năsăud
- County (Județ)
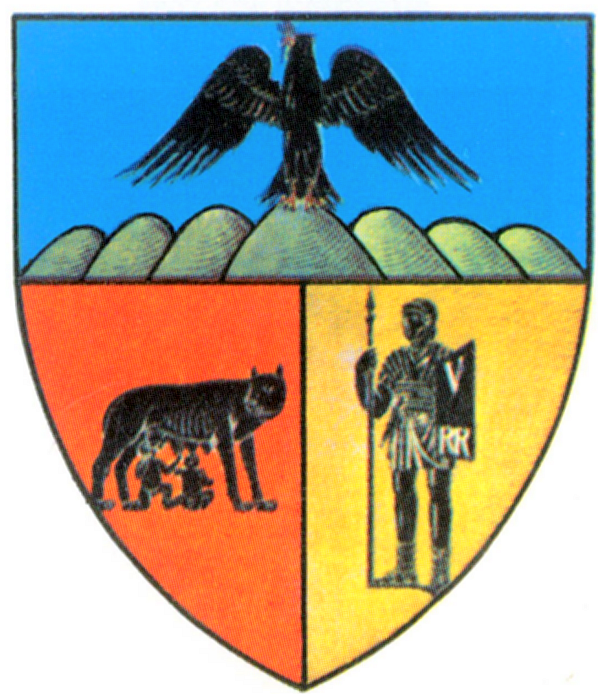
- Coat of arms

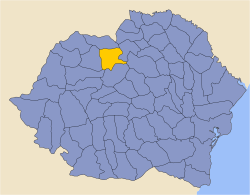
- Country: Romania
- Historic region: Transylvania
- Capital city (Reședință de județ): Bistrița
- Established: 1925
- Ceased to exist: Administrative reform of 1950

Area
  - Total: 4,326 km^{2} (1,670 sq mi)

Population (1930)
  - Total: 144,131
  - Density: 33.32/km^{2} (86.29/sq mi)
- Time zone: UTC+2 (EET)
  - Summer (DST): UTC+3 (EEST)

Năsăud County is one of the historic counties of Transylvania, Romania. The county seat was Bistrița.

== Geography ==
Năsăud County was located in the north-central part of Greater Romania, in the north of Transylvania, covering 4,326 km^{2} (1,670 sq mi). Currently, the territory that comprised Năsăud County is mostly included in the Bistrița-Năsăud County, while its eastern part belongs now to Suceava County.

In the interwar period, the county was bordered on the south by Mureș County and a small part of Cluj County, to the west by Someș County, to the north by Maramureș County, and to the east by the counties of Câmpulung and Neamț.

== History ==
The territory of Năsăud County was ceded to Romania by Hungary, as successor state to Austria-Hungary in the Treaty of Trianon (1920). Prior to then, the territory formed Beszterce-Naszód County in the Kingdom of Hungary. Romanian authorities established the county in 1925.

In 1938, the county was disestablished and incorporated into the newly formed Ținutul Mureș. In September 1940, following the Second Vienna Award, the county was annexed by Hungary and incorporated into a re-formed Beszterce-Naszód County until 1944. In 1945, the county was re-established under Romanian rule and it was abolished in 1950 by the Communist regime, becoming part of the Rodna Region.

== Administrative organization ==
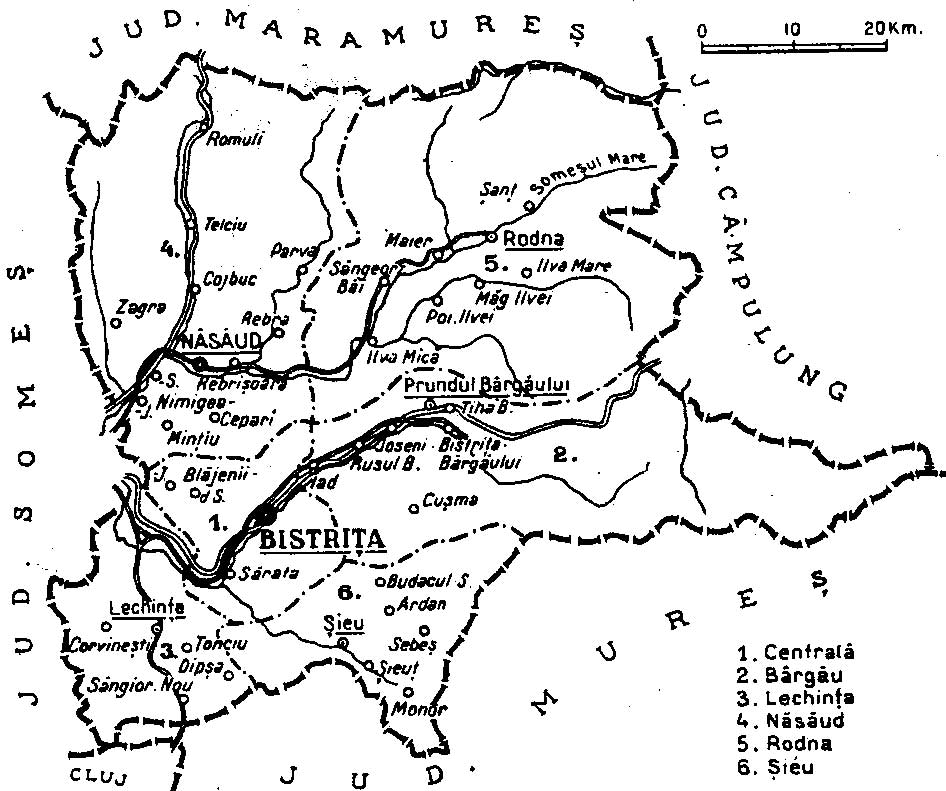
Map of the Năsăud County as constituted in 1938.

Administratively, Năsăud County was originally divided into four districts (plăși):

1. Plasa Bârgău
2. Plasa Năsăud
3. Plasa Rodna
4. Plasa Șieu

Subsequently, the number of districts in the county became six, by setting up two new districts:

1. Plasa Centrală
2. Plasa Lechința

== Population ==
According to the 1930 census data, the county population was 144,131, ethnically divided as follows: 71.5% Romanians, 14.4% Germans, 5.2% Hungarians, 4.4% Jews, 4.1% Romanies, as well as other minorities. Categorized by mother tongue, the population spoke Romanian (73.9%), German (14.6%), Hungarian (5.0%), Yiddish (4.1%), as well as other minority languages. From the religious point of view, the population was 60.2% Greek Catholic, 15.5% Lutheran, 13.8% Eastern Orthodox, 4.4% Jewish, 3.6% Reformed, 2.3% Roman Catholic, as well as other minorities.

=== Urban population ===
In 1930, the county's urban population was 17,640, ethnically divided as follows: 48.4% Romanians, 25.8% Germans, 14.7% Jews, 8.3% Hungarians, as well as other minorities. Categorized by mother tongue, the population spoke Romanian (48.5%), German (26.9%), Yiddish (13.9%), Hungarian (9.0%), as well as other minority languages. From the religious point of view, the urban population was composed of 38.7% Greek Catholic, 23.8% Lutheran, 14.9% Jewish, 10.4% Eastern Orthodox, 6.5% Roman Catholic, 5.3% Reformed, as well as other minorities.
